= Crocynia microphyllina =

Scientific classification
- Kingdom: Fungi
- Division: Ascomycota
- Class: Lecanoromycetes
- Order: Lecanorales
- Family: Ramalinaceae
- Genus: Crocynia
- Species: C. microphyllina

Binomial name
- Crocynia microphyllina Aptroot (2011)
- Type locality: Owen Stanley Range, Papua New Guinea

Species of lichen-forming fungus

Crocynia microphyllina is a corticolous (bark-dwelling) crustose lichen in the family Ramalinaceae. It was formally described as a new species in 2011 by André Aptroot, based on a single collection from the Owen Stanley Range of Papua New Guinea (along the Kokoda Trail near Kagi village) at about 1,700 m elevation. It is known only from the type locality, which is primary tropical montane forest dominated by Lithocarpus.

== Description ==
It forms a pale greenish-white, dull, thallus with a cottony (byssoid) surface, made up of small, scalloped areoles (about 0.4–2.0 mm across) that sit on a continuous black, cobweb-like hypothallus (a web of fungal filaments beneath the main thallus) that may spread across patches up to about 10 cm wide. The hypothallus filaments are around 2–3 micrometres (μm) thick and may be roughened by crystals. The thallus produces many ascending phyllidia (small, leaf-like outgrowths) that arise from the edges of the areoles and are typically up to about 0.3 mm across and 0.2 mm high. These structures are pale like the thallus and contain tangled hyphae with abundant crystals. The photosynthetic partner is a chlorococcoid alga with ellipsoid cells (about 5 × 7 μm), while apothecia and pycnidia are unknown. Chemically, the species contains protocetraric acid. Although sterile, its byssoid thallus on an arachnoid (cobwebby) hypothallus and chlorococcoid algae support placement in Crocynia, and it was described as the first member of the genus reported with phyllidia.
