= Coppinsidea vainioana =

Scientific classification
- Domain: Eukaryota
- Kingdom: Fungi
- Division: Ascomycota
- Class: Lecanoromycetes
- Order: Lecanorales
- Family: Ramalinaceae
- Genus: Coppinsidea
- Species: C. vainioana

Binomial name
- Coppinsidea vainioana S.Y.Kondr., E.Farkas & L.Lőkös (2019)

Synonyms
- Lecidea sphaeroidiza Vain. (1934); Biatora sphaeroidiza Printzen et Holien (1995)

Species of lichen in the family Ramalinaeae

Coppinsidea vainioana is a species of crustose lichen in the family Ramalinaceae. It occurs in Europe, where it grows on the bark of pine trees.

== Taxonomy ==
Coppinsidea vainioana was originally published posthumously by Finnish lichenologist Edvard August Vainio in 1934 as Lecidea sphaeroidiza, in the fourth volume of his series Lichenographia Fennia. The type was collected by Vainio in 1882 at Isosaari (Swedish: Mjölö), an island in Helsinki. The lichen, he noted, was growing abundantly on the bark on pine trees both on the island and also in nearby areas. The species was transferred to the genus Biatora in 1995. However, Vainio's name is illegitimate, because it has an older, competing homonym, Lecidea sphaeroidiza, which was described by William Nylander in 1896. Lichenologists Sergey Kondratyuk, Edit Farkas, and Laszlo Lőkös circumscribed the genus Coppinsidea in 2019, and created a new name for Vainio's lichen when they moved it to the new genus.
