= Tylocliostomum =

Scientific classification
- Kingdom: Fungi
- Division: Ascomycota
- Class: Lecanoromycetes
- Order: Lecanorales
- Family: Ramalinaceae
- Genus: Tylocliostomum van den Boom & Magain (2020)
- Species: T. viridifarinosum

Binomial name
- Tylocliostomum viridifarinosum van den Boom & Magain (2020)

Genus of lichens

Tylocliostomum is a fungal genus in the family Ramalinaceae. It comprises the single species Tylocliostomum viridifarinosum.

== Taxonomy ==
The genus Tylocliostomum was circumscribed in 2020 by the lichenologists Pieter P.G. van den Boom and Nicolas Magain. It is distinguished from the related genus Tylothallia by several microscopic features, including its different spore-containing structures (Catillaria-type asci) and simpler filaments in the reproductive tissue (simple paraphyses). Unlike the somewhat similar-looking genus Cliostomum, it lacks spore-producing structures called pycnidia and has a different cellular arrangement in its fruiting body wall. The genus name Tylocliostomum alludes to its evolutionary relationships and appearance, combining elements of two related genera: Tylothallia, with which it shares genetic ancestry, and Cliostomum, which it resembles in its outward appearance (particularly species like C. griffithii).

== Description ==
Tylocliostomum viridifarinosum forms a thin, continuous crust on its substrate, with a distinctive powdery or mealy (farinose) texture. The surface consists of tiny green granules (goniocysts) measuring 8–20 micrometres (μm) in diameter. The lichen's reproductive structures (apothecia) are small, ranging from 0.15 to 0.4 millimetres across, and vary from flat to slightly convex. These apothecia have a rim (proper margin) that is either the same colour as or slightly paler than the central disc, though this rim often disappears as the structure matures. The disc itself can be white to pale cream, sometimes with a slight yellowish tinge, or occasionally medium grey with a bluish-grey cast.

When examined microscopically, the spores are narrowly ellipsoid to rod-shaped (bacillar), measuring 11–17 by 2.5–3.2 μm, with a single cross-wall (septum) and thin walls. Each spore-producing sac (ascus) contains eight spores. The species contains no detectable lichen substances when tested with standard chemical spot tests.

== Habitat and distribution ==
At the time of its original publication, Tylocliostomum viridifarinosum was known only from its type locality in Madeira, Portugal, where it was discovered at Chão dos Louros. The lichen grows abundantly on the twigs of Erica shrubs in this area, sharing its habitat with two other lichen species: Cliomegalaria symmictoides and Endohyalina ericina. It was found at an elevation of 825 metres above sea level in an area characterised by mature trees along laurel forest (laurisilva).
