= Physcidia striata =

Scientific classification
- Domain: Eukaryota
- Kingdom: Fungi
- Division: Ascomycota
- Class: Lecanoromycetes
- Order: Lecanorales
- Family: Ramalinaceae
- Genus: Physcidia
- Species: P. striata

Binomial name
- Physcidia striata Aptroot, M.Cáceres & Timdal (2014)

Species of lichen

Physcidia striata is a species of corticolous (bark-dwelling), microfoliose lichen in the family Ramalinaceae. Found in South America, it was formally described as a new species in 2014 by lichenologists André Aptroot, Marcela Cáceres, and Einar Timdal. The type specimen was collected by the first two authors from the Estação Ecológica de Cuniã (Rondônia), where it was found growing on the smooth bark of a tree in a primary rainforest. It also occurs in Peru. The thallus of the lichen is a loose mat of squamules (scales) without a hypothallus. Its lobes are smooth, flat, branched, and greyish-green, measuring 2–7 mm long by 0.5–1.5 mm wide. The species epithet striata refers to the faint longitudinal striations that are present on the lobe undersides. Isidia occur on the thallus surface; they are the same colour as the thallus, with dimensions of 0.3–0.7 mm long by 0.1–0.2 mm wide. When they are abraded, it reveals the whitish colour of the underlying medulla. The lichen contains divaricatic acid, a lichen product that is revealed with the use of thin-layer chromatography.
