= Aciculopsora =

Scientific classification
- Kingdom: Fungi
- Division: Ascomycota
- Class: Lecanoromycetes
- Order: Lecanorales
- Family: Ramalinaceae
- Genus: Aciculopsora; Aptroot & Trest (2006)

Type species
- Aciculopsora salmonea Aptroot & Trest (2006)

Species
- A. cinerea A. longispora A. srilankensis

Genus of lichens

Aciculopsora is a small genus of lichen-forming fungi in the family Ramalinaceae. The genus was established in 2006 and as of 2025 contains three recognised species, all found growing on tree bark in tropical regions. These lichens are distributed across Central and South America, East Africa, and Sri Lanka, though they appear to be rare or simply under-collected.

== Taxonomy ==
Aciculopsora was introduced in 2006 by André Aptroot and Marie Trest for the Costa Rican species A. salmonea, designated as the generic type; a second species, A. cinerea, was added from Brazil in 2007. A multi-locus study of Ramalinaceae later placed A. salmonea near Scutula and Parallopsora, prompting a broader re-examination of related material. In their 2020 revision, Sonja Kistenich and colleagues sequenced mitochondrial mtSSU and nuclear ITS regions from newly collected specimens and recovered Aciculopsora as a well-supported monophyletic genus allied to Scutula and Parallopsora.

That study also resolved the long-standing link between Phyllopsora longispora and Aciculopsora: material identified as P. longispora grouped with the isotype of A. salmonea, and the authors treated them as the same species, making the new combination Aciculopsora longispora and reducing A. salmonea to synonymy; the designated type species, A. salmonea, is now treated as a synonym of A. longispora. In addition, they described A. srilankensis from Sri Lanka, bringing the genus to three species: A. longispora (now known from East Africa and the Neotropics), A. srilankensis (Sri Lanka), and A. cinerea (Atlantic Forest, Brazil). Although the holotype of A. cinerea did not yield DNA, it is maintained as distinct on morphological grounds (small, grey-disced apothecia and shorter ascospores). Overall, the revision substantially expanded the known range of the genus and clarified its circumscription within Ramalinaceae.

== Habitat and distribution ==
Aciculopsora is a corticolous (bark-dwelling) tropical genus occurring on tree trunks. Across the limited material available (only eleven collections worldwide) it spans both the Neotropics and the Paleotropics. Confirmed records include Brazil, Costa Rica, Ecuador (including the Galápagos), Argentina, Kenya, and Sri Lanka, with habitats ranging from dry semi-deciduous woodland and abandoned farmland through Atlantic Forest to dense rainforest.

Given the very few collections, the authors argue that the apparent rarity may reflect under-collection and identification difficulty. They recommend searching for the genus in tropical regions from wet rainforests to dry semi-deciduous forests, noting that tropical islands are especially likely to yield additional records.

== Species ==
- Aciculopsora cinerea M.Cáceres & Lücking (2007) – Brazil
- Aciculopsora longispora (Swinscow & Krog) S.Kistenich, M.Bendiksby & E.Timdal (2019) – Argentina; Costa Rica; Ecuador; Kenya
- Aciculopsora srilankensis Kistenich, Bendiksby, Weerakoon & Timdal (2019) – Sri Lanka

The taxon Aciculopsora salmonea Aptroot & Trest (2006), originally assigned as the type species of the genus, was later determined to be synonymous with Aciculopsora longispora.
