= Parallopsora brakoae =

Scientific classification
- Kingdom: Fungi
- Division: Ascomycota
- Class: Lecanoromycetes
- Order: Lecanorales
- Family: Ramalinaceae
- Genus: Parallopsora
- Species: P. brakoae

Binomial name
- Parallopsora brakoae (Timdal) Kistenich, Timdal & Bendiksby (2018)
- Holotype: Allpahuayo-Mishana National Reserve, Peru

Synonyms
- Phyllopsora brakoae Timdal (2008)

Species of lichen

Parallopsora brakoae is a species of bark-dwelling, squamulose lichen in the family Ramalinaceae. This small lichen forms thin mats of tiny, leaf-like scales on tree bark and reproduces through powdery soredia produced in lip-shaped patches on the underside of the scale tips. It is known only from a single collection in the Peruvian Amazon rainforest, where it was discovered growing on a large tree in a white-sand ridge habitat.

== Taxonomy ==
Phyllopsora brakoae was described as new to science in 2008 by Einar Timdal, who initially placed it in the genus Phyllopsora. The holotype was collected on the trunk of a large tree in lowland Amazon rainforest at the Allpahuayo-Mishana National Reserve, Loreto, Peru at an elevation between 120 and 150 m (390 and 490 ft). Thin-layer chromatography (TLC) detected no lichen substances in the type. In Timdal's revision, P. brakoae is among the first Phyllopsora species formally recorded to produce soredia (powdery propagules), expanding the genus concept to include sorediate taxa. The taxon was transferred to Parallopsora in 2018.

== Description ==
The lichen body (thallus) of Parallopsora brakoae forms a thin, spreading mat of tiny, leaf-like scales (squamules). These are medium-sized, up to about 0.5 mm across, initially lie flat on the bark and then soon lift and become somewhat erect and elongated. Their tips are shallowly to deeply cut; the upper surface is grayish-green and dull, and the margins are the same color and lack hairs. A prothallus (a contrasting fungal border around the colony) is absent.

Reproduction is mainly by soredia: fine, powdery granules that break off to start new colonies. In this species the soredia are produced in lip-shaped patches (labriform soralia) that form on the underside near the tips of the squamules; individual soredia are up to about 40 micrometres (μm). In section, the thin outer "skin" (upper cortex) is 20–35 μm thick and lacks crystals; the inner tissue (medulla) also lacks crystals, and standard spot tests are negative (PD−, K−), in line with the TLC result of no detectable lichen substances. Sexual and asexual fruiting structures (apothecia and pycnidia) were not observed.

== Habitat and distribution ==
Parallopsora brakoae is known only from the type locality in the Peruvian Amazon. It was found on the bark of a single large tree at a relatively well-lit site on a white-sand ridge; other corticolous lichens on the same trunk included Crocynia pyxinoides, Eschatogonia dissecta, Phyllopsora cuyabensis, and P. soralifera.
