= Lueckingia =

Scientific classification
- Kingdom: Fungi
- Division: Ascomycota
- Class: Lecanoromycetes
- Order: Lecanorales
- Family: Ramalinaceae
- Genus: Lueckingia; Aptroot & L.Umaña (2006)
- Species: L. polyspora

Binomial name
- Lueckingia polyspora Aptroot & L.Umaña (2006)

Single species fungal genus

Lueckingia is a genus in the family Ramalinaceae. It is a monospecific genus, containing the single corticolous lichen species Lueckingia polyspora. The genus and species were described as new to science in 2006. The species, known only from Costa Rica, was originally found growing on bark in the shaded understory of a lowland rainforest.

== Taxonomy ==
Lueckingia was established in 2006 by André Aptroot and Loengrin Umaña to accommodate a distinctive squamulose lichen in the family Ramalinaceae; the genus is monospecific, with Lueckingia polyspora designated as the type and only species. The holotype was collected on bark in lowland rainforest at the Hitoy Cerere Biological Reserve on Costa Rica's Caribbean slope (Limón Province; near Pandora; 150–500 m elevations), with isotypes (duplicates) deposited in several herbaria. The species epithet honours Robert Lücking, whose work helped drive the TICOLICHEN biodiversity inventory during which the material was discovered.

Aptroot and Umaña separated Lueckingia from superficially similar ramalinaceous genera on a suite of characters rather than any single trait. Although the thallus and apothecial appearance recall Physcidia, Lueckingia differs in having polysporous asci, a lack of detectable secondary metabolites (by thin-layer chromatography and spot tests), a microphylline (not placodioid) thallus, and biatorine apothecia. It also differs from other squamulose genera with biatorine apothecia by its polysporous asci. Superficial resemblance to the polysporous tropical genus Piccolia is discounted because Piccolia species have a crustose thallus, usually contain anthraquinones, and have a different ascus type. These combined features, according to the authors, justified placement in a separate, monospecific genus.

== Habitat and distribution ==
Lueckingia polyspora is corticolous, occurring on the bark of large rainforest trees (reportedly a member of the Lecythidaceae) in the shaded understorey of lowland tropical rainforest. Known collections come from 150–500 m elevation on the Caribbean slope of the Cordillera de Talamanca in Costa Rica, where the type was taken in disturbed primary forest at the Hitoy Cerere Reserve near Pandora.
