= Coppinsidea =

Scientific classification
- Domain: Eukaryota
- Kingdom: Fungi
- Division: Ascomycota
- Class: Lecanoromycetes
- Order: Lecanorales
- Family: Ramalinaceae
- Genus: Coppinsidea; S.Y.Kondr., Farkas & Lőkös (2019)

Type species
- Coppinsidea sphaerella (Hedl.) S.Y.Kondr., Farkas & Lőkös (2019)

Species
- C. sphaerella C. vainioana

Genus of lichens in the family Ramalinaeae

Coppinsidea is a genus of two species of crustose lichens in the family Ramalinaceae. It was circumscribed in 2019 by lichenologists Sergey Kondratyuk, Edit Farkas, and Laszlo Lőkös with Coppinsidea sphaerella designated as the type species. Species of Coppinsidea are similar in appearance and morphology to Thamnolecania, but differ from them in having a thallus that is crustose (rather than fruticose), mostly convex to almost spherical apothecia that are lecideine or biatorine in structure, as well as in being distributed in the Northern Hemisphere.

The genus is named to honour British lichenologist Brian J. Coppins.

== Species ==
- Coppinsidea sphaerella (Hedl.) S.Y.Kondr., Farkas & Lőkös (2019)
- Coppinsidea vainioana S.Y.Kondr., E.Farkas & L.Lőkös (2019)

Several species included in the original circumscription of the genus have since been moved to other genera:

- Coppinsidea alba (Coppins & Vězda) S.Y.Kondr., Farkas & Lőkös (2019) (Biatora veteranorum)
- Coppinsidea aphana (Nyl.) S.Y.Kondr., Farkas & Lőkös (2019) (Catillaria aphana)
- Coppinsidea croatica (Zahlbr.) S.Y.Kondr., Farkas & Lőkös (2019) (Lecania croatica)
- Coppinsidea fuscoviridis (Anzi) S.Y.Kondr., Farkas & Lőkös (2019) (Bacidia fuscoviridis)
- Coppinsidea pallens (Kullh.) S.Y.Kondr., Farkas & Lőkös (2019) (Biatora pallens)
- Coppinsidea ropalosporoides (S.Y.Kondr., Lőkös & Hur) S.Y.Kondr., Farkas & Lőkös (2019) (Gyalidea ropalosporoides)
- Coppinsidea scotinodes (Nyl.) S.Y.Kondr., Farkas & Lőkös (2019) (Catillaria scotinodes)
