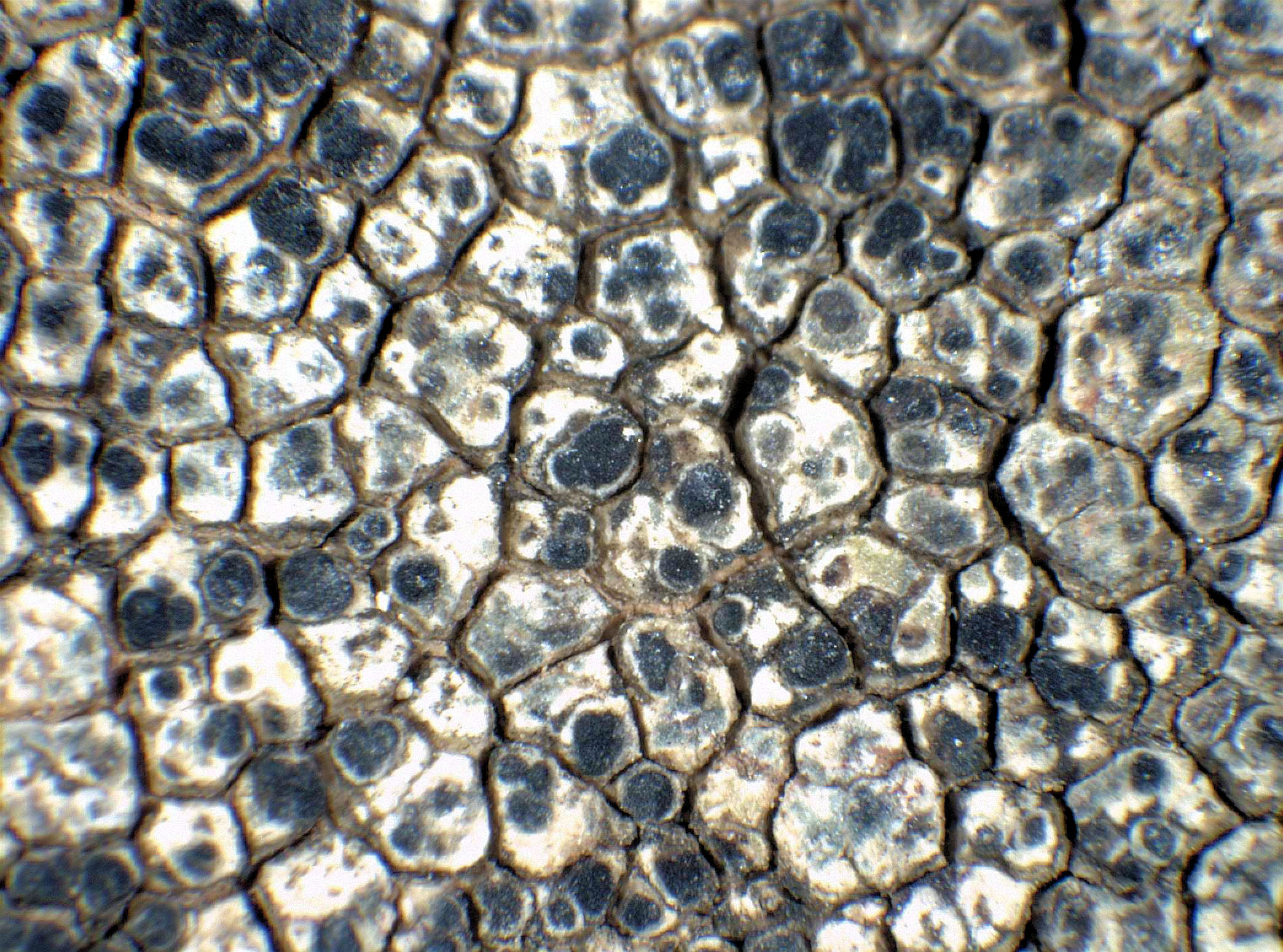
- Kiliasia episema

Scientific classification
- Domain: Eukaryota
- Kingdom: Fungi
- Division: Ascomycota
- Class: Lecanoromycetes
- Order: Lecanorales
- Family: Ramalinaceae
- Genus: Kiliasia; Hafellner (1984)

Type species
- Kiliasia athallina (Hepp) Hafellner (1984)

Species
- K. athallina K. episema K. granulosa K. nordlandica K. pennina K. sculpturata K. superioris

= Kiliasia =

Genus of lichens

Kiliasia is a genus of lichen-forming fungi in the family Ramalinaceae. It comprises seven species.

== Taxonomy ==
It was originally erected by Josef Hafellner in 1984 as a monospecific genus to accommodate the species Kiliasia athallina. The genus was later included in Toninia by Einar Timdal in 1992. However, molecular phylogenetics studies by Sonja Kistenich and colleagues (2018) have shown that Kiliasia represents a distinct lineage within the Ramalinaceae, leading to its resurrection as a separate genus. Several species now placed in Kiliasia were originally described in other genera such as Biatora, Catillaria, and Lecidea before being transferred to Toninia and then Kiliasia.

Kiliasia corresponds partly to Timdal's (1992) Toninia groups 1, 3, and 7. It forms a distinct clade within the Toninia-group of the Ramalinaceae in molecular phylogenies.

== Description ==
The thallus (body) of Kiliasia species is typically crustose, meaning it forms a crust-like growth tightly attached to its substrate. However, the genus shows some variation in growth forms, with some species being non-lichen forming (lacking the algal partner) and others forming squamules (small, scale-like structures).

The fruiting bodies (reproductive structures) of Kiliasia are apothecia, which are disc-shaped structures that produce spores. The ascospores show variation within the genus. They range from ellipsoid (oval-shaped) and 1-septate (having one cross-wall) to shortly bacilliform (short rod-shaped) and 3-septate (having three cross-walls).

Some species in the genus may contain a green pigment in the epithecium (the uppermost layer of the apothecium) and exciple (the outer layer of the apothecium). This pigment does not change colour when treated with potassium hydroxide (K–) but turns violet when treated with nitric acid (N+ violet). This pigment is referred to as 'Bagliettoana-green' in lichenological literature.

== Species ==
As of October 2024, Species Fungorum (in the Catalogue of Life) accept seven species of Kiliasia:

- Kiliasia athallina (Hepp) Hafellner (1984)
- Kiliasia episema (Nyl.) Hafellner (1984)
- Kiliasia granulosa (Szatala) Timdal (2018)
- Kiliasia nordlandica (Th.Fr.) Kistenich, Timdal, Bendiksby & S.Ekman (2018)
- Kiliasia pennina (Schaer.) Kistenich, Timdal, Bendiksby & S.Ekman (2018)
- Kiliasia sculpturata (H.Magn.) Kistenich, Timdal, Bendiksby & S.Ekman (2018)
- Kiliasia superioris (Timdal) Timdal (2018)

The species once known as Kiliasia scotinodes (Nyl.) Coppins (1988) is now in the genus Catillaria, as C. scotinodes.
