= Bibbya =

Scientific classification
- Domain: Eukaryota
- Kingdom: Fungi
- Division: Ascomycota
- Class: Lecanoromycetes
- Order: Lecanorales
- Family: Ramalinaceae
- Genus: Bibbya; J.H.Willis (1956)

Type species
- Bibbya muelleri (F.Wilson) J.H.Willis (1956)

Genus of lichens

Bibbya is a genus of fruticose lichens in the family Ramalinaceae.

== Taxonomy ==
The genus was circumscribed in 1956 by Australian botanist James Hamlyn Willis, with Bibbya muelleri assigned as the type species. The generic name honours Patrick Noel Sumner Bibby (1907–1955), a colleague with whom Willis had collaborated, and who had died the year previously.

In 1992, Einer Timdal included Bibbya in Toninia. The genus was resurrected in 2018 after a comprehensive molecular phylogeny of the family Ramalinaceae. The authors transferred several species previously placed in genus Toninia, as well as one previously placed in Bacidia.

== Description ==
Bibbya is characterized by the presence of a reddish-brown pigment in the epithecium (the tissue layer above the asci) and in the rim of the exciple (the ring-like structure surrounding the apothecium). The thallus varies in form from crustose to squamulose or bullate (covered with rounded swellings like blisters). The ascospores range in shape from ellipsoid with a single septum, to filiform (threadlike) with multiple septa.

== Species ==
The following list gives the species of Bibbya, followed by their taxonomic authority (standardized author abbreviations are used), year of publication (or year transferred to the genus Bibbya), and type locality.

- Bibbya albomarginata (H.Kilias & Gotth.Schneid.) Kistenich, Timdal, Bendiksby & S.Ekman (2018) – Peru
- Bibbya australis (Timdal) Timdal (2018) – South Australia
- Bibbya austroafricana (Timdal) Timdal (2018) – Lesotho
- Bibbya bullata (Meyen & Flot.) Kistenich, Timdal, Bendiksby & S.Ekman (2018) – Chile/Peru
- Bibbya glaucocarpa (Timdal) Timdal (2018) – Australian Capital Territory
- Bibbya hosseusiana (Gyeln.) Timdal (2018) – Córdoba, Argentina
- Bibbya lutosa (Ach.) Kistenich, Timdal, Bendiksby & S.Ekman (2018) – Switzerland
- Bibbya muelleri (F.Wilson) J.H.Willis (1956) – Victoria (Australia)
- Bibbya ruginosa (Tuck.) Kistenich, Timdal, Bendiksby & S.Ekman (2018) – Oakland Hills, Oakland, California
- Bibbya subcircumspecta (Coppins) S.Ekman (2018) – Scotland
- Bibbya vermifera (Nyl.) Kistenich, Timdal, Bendiksby & S.Ekman (2018) – Sweden
