= Heppiella =

Scientific classification
- Kingdom: Plantae
- Clade: Tracheophytes
- Clade: Angiosperms
- Clade: Eudicots
- Clade: Asterids
- Order: Lamiales
- Family: Gesneriaceae
- Genus: Heppiella; Regel

Synonyms
- Cheirisanthera Regel; Corysanthera Regel

Genus of plants

Heppiella is a genus of flowering plants belonging to the family Gesneriaceae.

Its native range is western South America to Venezuela. It is found in the countries of Colombia, Ecuador, Peru and Venezuela.

The genus name of Heppiella is in honour of Johann Adam Philipp Hepp (1797–1867), a German physician and lichenologist. It was first described and published in Gartenflora Vol.2 on page 353 in 1853.

Species, according to Kew:

- Heppiella repens Hanst.
- Heppiella ulmifolia (Kunth) Hanst.
- Heppiella verticillata (Cav.) Cuatrec.
- Heppiella viscida (Lindl. & Paxton) Fritsch
