= Crocynia =

Scientific classification
- Domain: Eukaryota
- Kingdom: Fungi
- Division: Ascomycota
- Class: Lecanoromycetes
- Order: Lecanorales
- Family: Ramalinaceae
- Genus: Crocynia (Ach.) A.Massal. (1860)

Species
- C. didymica C. fragilis C. glaucescens C. microphyllina C. minutiloba

Synonyms
- Lecidea sect. Crocynia Ach. (1810); Symplocia A.Massal. (1854)

Genus of lichens

Crocynia is a genus of lichen-forming fungi in the family Ramalinaceae. It has five species. The genus is currently in taxonomic limbo because molecular studies have shown that Crocynia, which has nomenclatural priority over Phyllopsora, is phylogenetically nested within Phyllopsora. This has led to a proposal to conserve the name Phyllopsora over Crocynia to ensure nomenclatural stability and avoid taxonomic disarray.

== Taxonomy ==
The genus Crocynia was initially circumscribed by Erik Acharius in 1810 as a section within the genus Lecidea, under the name Lecidea sect. Crocynia. It was later elevated to genus rank by Abramo Bartolommeo Massalongo in 1860. The type species of the genus is Crocynia gossypina, which was originally described as Lichen gossypinus by Olof Swartz.

Phyllopsora was described by Johannes Müller Argoviensis in 1894 to accommodate several species from New Zealand. Over time, it has become recognised as a pantropical genus, mainly occurring in moist woodlands and rainforests. The genus comprises nearly 60 species, including those indicating the types of three genera that have priority over Phyllopsora: Triclinum (1825), Symplocia (1854), and Crocynia (1860).

Recent molecular studies have shown that Crocynia is phylogenetically nested within the genus Phyllopsora. This has led to a proposal to conserve the name Phyllopsora over Crocynia and other competing names to ensure nomenclatural stability. According to the authors of the 2019 proposal, the conservation of Phyllopsora against Crocynia and Triclinum is favoured to avoid taxonomic disarray, given that the type material for many Crocynia species has been lost, and the historical inclusion of distantly related species has caused confusion.

Crocynia gossypina is a pantropical lichen species characterised by its byssoid (cottony) thallus, which lacks an upper cortex, making it distinctive. However, many species historically placed in Crocynia have been reassigned to other genera, such as Lepraria. The genus name Phyllopsora is widely known and used among lichenologists, particularly those working with tropical material, making it a practical choice for conservation.

If the proposal is accepted, the genus Crocynia will be synonymised under Phyllopsora, reflecting current phylogenetic understanding and simplifying the classification of these lichens. This change will also help maintain continuity in the scientific literature and avoid the need for extensive renaming of species.

== Species ==
As of June 2024, Species Fungorum (via the Catalogue of Life) accept five species of Crocynia:

- Crocynia didymica Sipman (2018)
- Crocynia fragilis B.de Lesd. (1924)
- Crocynia glaucescens (F.Wilson) S.Y.Kondr., Elix & Kärnefelt (2011)
- Crocynia microphyllina Aptroot (2011)
- Crocynia minutiloba Aptroot (2014)
