= Echidnocymbium =

Scientific classification
- Domain: Eukaryota
- Kingdom: Fungi
- Division: Ascomycota
- Class: Lecanoromycetes
- Order: Lecanorales
- Family: Ramalinaceae
- Genus: Echidnocymbium; Brusse (1987)

Type species
- Echidnocymbium speciosum Brusse (1987)

Genus of lichen-forming fungi

Echidnocymbium is a genus of lichen-forming fungi in the family Ramalinaceae. This is a monotypic genus, containing the single species Echidnocymbium speciosum.
