= Lecaniella =

Scientific classification
- Kingdom: Fungi
- Division: Ascomycota
- Class: Lecanoromycetes
- Order: Lecanorales
- Family: Ramalinaceae
- Genus: Lecaniella; Jatta (1889)

Type species
- Lecaniella cyrtella (Ach.) Jatta 1889

Species
- L. prasinoides L. tenera

Genus of lichen-forming fungi

Lecaniella is a small genus of lichen-forming fungi in the family Ramalinaceae. It comprises two species. The genus was originally established in 1889 by the Italian lichenologist Antonio Jatta, but fell out of use until it was resurrected in 2019 based on molecular evidence showing that these species form a distinct evolutionary lineage. Lecaniella lichens are characterised by their crustose growth form with lecanorine apothecia (fruiting bodies surrounded by a rim of thallus tissue) and small, broadened ascospores. Species in this genus were formerly classified within the related genus Lecania, from which they are now separated on both molecular and morphological grounds.

== Taxonomy ==
The Italian lichenologist Antonio Jatta erected Lecaniella in 1889 to separate a small set of lecanioid crusts that he judged misplaced between Biatora and Lecania. In his Latin diagnosis he emphasised two simple points a field worker could recognise: the apothecia are plainly lecanorine (with a rim formed by the thallus) and the spores are consistently small, broadened ("dilated"), and never the four-celled type then expected in Lecania. On that basis he instituted the new genus with three species, treating L. cyrtella, L. sambucina, and L. rabenhorstii as its core members. These three species are now classified in Lecania.

Lecaniella was resurrected by Sergey Kondratyuk and co-authors (2019) on the basis of a combined three-locus molecular phylogeny (nrITS, mtSSU, rpb2) of Ramalinaceae. Their analyses showed that Lecania sensu lato is not monophyletic and that a distinct Lecaniella lineage sits within the Lecania s.l. clade. In the tree Lecaniella forms its own branch separate from Lecania s.str., with strong support for two internal species groups. Josef Hafellner's earlier typification of Lecaniella cyrtella as the genus type is noted in the same treatment.

The authors recognise two well-supported clusters: an L. erysibe group (including L. erysibe, L. belgica, L. sylvestris, L. hutchinsiae, L. cyrtella) and an L. dubitans group (including L. dubitans, L. naegelii, L. cyrtellina, L. sambucina, L. proteiformis, L. prasinoides). To stabilise usage they made new combinations for several of these names in Lecaniella and concluded that Lecaniella should be retained for the L. erysibe group and, provisionally, expanded to include the L. dubitans group until more data are available. The paper also confirms that some names Jatta originally placed in Lecaniella (e.g., L. cyrtella, L. proteiformis, L. sambucina) fit the resurrected concept.

Some relationships remain unresolved. In mtSSU trees, L. naegelii and L. tenera (together with Biatora vezdana) form a distinct branch that might warrant segregation, but the authors defer any split pending fuller sampling (noting gaps for mtSSU or rpb2 in several taxa). They also show that the former "Lecania chlorotiza group" belongs in a separate Atlantic-bark lineage they name Vandenboomia, outside Lecaniella.

To avoid confusion with a later-established algal fossil genus of the same name, Cookson and Eisenack (1962) introduced a non-lichen "Lecaniella" for discoidal palynomorphs of uncertain affinity, diagnosed as a one-layered, saucer-shaped shell with various external ornament. Subsequent work showed these forms are halves of dehiscent zygospores of freshwater Zygnemataceae (e.g., Spirogyra), recorded from Middle Triassic strata through to Recent deposits. Because Jatta's 1889 lichen genus is the senior homonym, Ravn and Zippi (2024) replaced the algal fossil name with Zygnematiella, leaving the lichen genus Lecaniella unaffected.

== Species ==
Although Kondratyuk and colleagues made seven new combinations into Lecaniella in their 2019 work, Species Fungorum (in the Catalogue of Life) currently accept two species in the genus:

- Lecaniella prasinoides (Elenkin) S.Y.Kondr. (2019)
- Lecaniella tenera (Lönnr.) S.Y.Kondr. (2019)
