= Tasmidella =

Scientific classification
- Kingdom: Fungi
- Division: Ascomycota
- Class: Lecanoromycetes
- Order: Lecanorales
- Family: Ramalinaceae
- Genus: Tasmidella; Kantvilas, Hafellner & Elix (1999)

Type species
- Tasmidella variabilis Kantvilas, Hafellner & Elix (1999)

Genus of fungi

Tasmidella is a lichen genus in the family Ramalinaceae. Circumscribed by Gintaras Kantvilas, Josef Hafellner, and John A. Elix in 1999, it contains the single species Tasmidella variabilis, found in Tasmania. It is distinguished from the closely related genus Megalaria by having simple spores with a layered wall.
