= Heppsora =

Scientific classification
- Domain: Eukaryota
- Kingdom: Fungi
- Division: Ascomycota
- Class: Lecanoromycetes
- Order: Lecanorales
- Family: Ramalinaceae
- Genus: Heppsora; D.D. Awasthi & Kr.P. Singh

Type species
- Heppsora indica D.D. Awasthi & Kr.P. Singh

Species
- H. bullata H. indica

Genus of fungi

Heppsora is a genus of lichenized fungi in the family Ramalinaceae.

The genus name of Heppsora is in honour of Johann Adam Philipp Hepp (1797–1867), a German physician and lichenologist.

The genus was circumscribed by Dharani Dhar Awasthi and Krishna Pal Singh in Bryologist vol.80 on page 537 in 1977.
