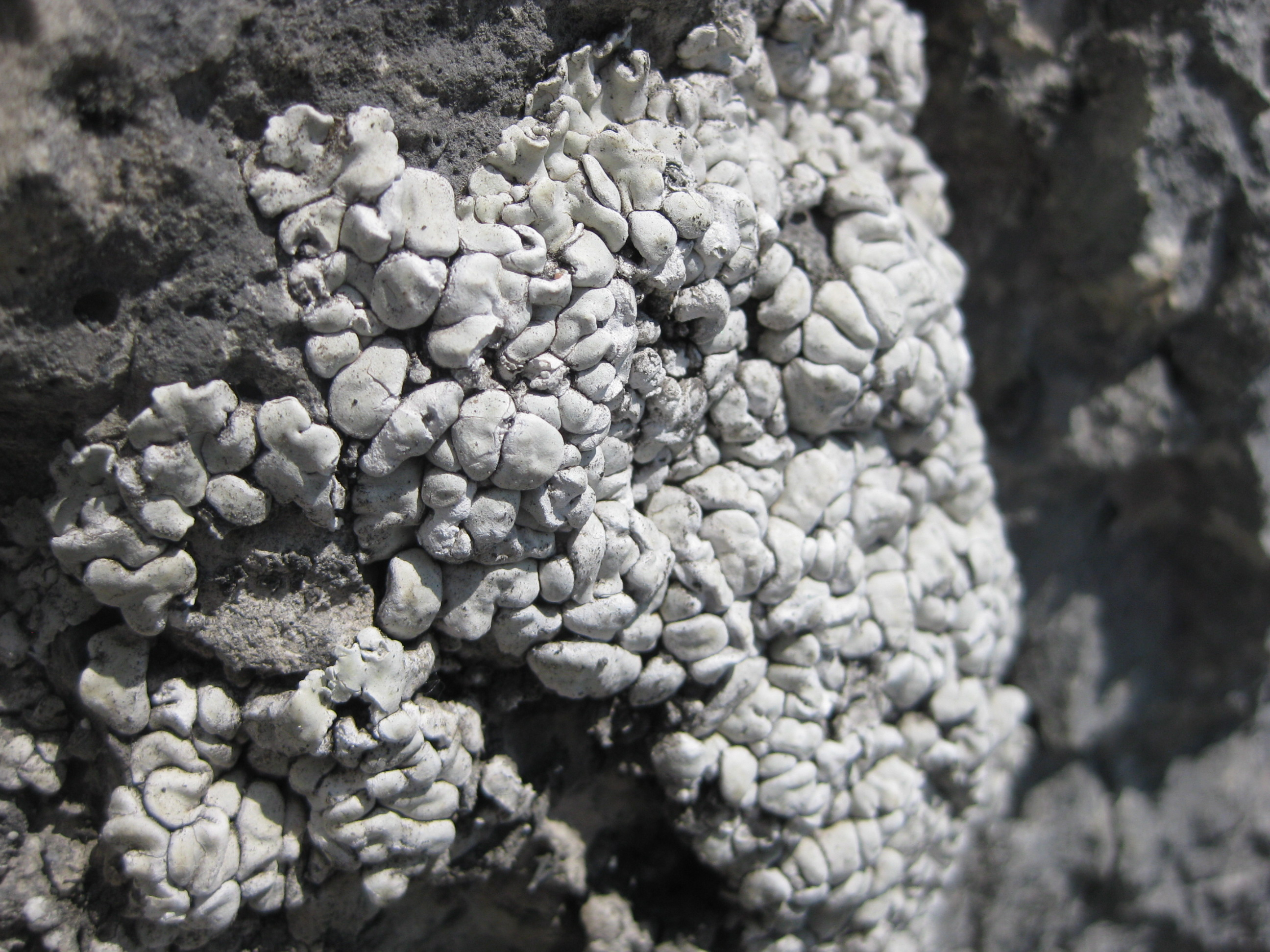
- Thalloidima candidum

Scientific classification
- Domain: Eukaryota
- Kingdom: Fungi
- Division: Ascomycota
- Class: Lecanoromycetes
- Order: Lecanorales
- Family: Ramalinaceae
- Genus: Thalloidima; A.Massal. (1852)

Type species
- Thalloidima vesiculare (Hoffm.) A.Massal. 1852

Synonyms
- Bacillina Nyl. (1896)

= Thalloidima =

Genus of lichens

Thalloidima is a genus of lichen-forming fungi in the family Ramalinaceae. It has 13 species.

== Taxonomy ==
The genus was originally circumscribed by Italian lichenologist Abramo Bartolommeo Massalongo in 1852. It was subsumed into genus Toninia by Einar Timdal in 1992. The genus was resurrected for use in 2018 by Kistenich and colleagues following a molecular phylogenetics-led restructuring of the Ramalinaceae.

== Description ==
Thalloidima is defined by the distinctive grey pigment in the epithecium and exciple rim, which turns violet with K+ and N+ reactions, originally termed as "Thalloidima-grün" (equivalent to Sedifolia-grey). The thallus predominantly appears as flattened squamulose to bullate. Two species in this genus are not lichenized. While many, if not all species, initiate their lifecycle as parasites on cyanolichens, some remain parasitic throughout. The ascospores generally range from ellipsoid to fusiform shapes and are 1-septate, though some rare forms are acicular and 3-septate.

== Species ==
As of October 2023, Species Fungorum (in the Catalogue of Life) include 13 species in Thalloidima:

- Thalloidima albilabrum (Dufour) Flagey (1896)
- Thalloidima arcticum (Timdal) Timdal (2018) – Holotype: Canada. Northwest Territories
- Thalloidima candidum (Weber) A.Massal. (1852)
- Thalloidima collematicola (Timdal) Timdal (2018) – Holotype: Italy
- Thalloidima ioen (Herre) S.Ekman & Timdal (2018)
- Thalloidima leptogii (Timdal) Timdal (2018) Holotype: Italy
- Thalloidima massatum (Tuck.) Kistenich, Timdal, Bendiksby & S.Ekman (2018) – Holotype: USA
- Thalloidima opuntioides (Vill.) Kistenich, Timdal, Bendiksby & S.Ekman (2018) – Neotype: France
- Thalloidima physaroides (Opiz) Opiz (1857) – Holotype: Czech Republic
- Thalloidima rosulatum Anzi (1868)
- Thalloidima sedifolium (Scop.) Kistenich, Timdal, Bendiksby & S.Ekman (2018) – Neotype: Italy
- Thalloidima subdiffractum (Timdal) Timdal (2018) – Holotype: USA
- Thalloidima tauricum Szatala (1942)
