= Appressodiscus =

Scientific classification
- Domain: Eukaryota
- Kingdom: Fungi
- Division: Ascomycota
- Class: Lecanoromycetes
- Order: Lecanorales
- Family: Ramalinaceae
- Genus: Appressodiscus; Aptroot & L.A.Santos (2023)

Type species
- Appressodiscus isidiobadius Aptroot & L.A.Santos (2023)

Species
- A. badius A. isidiobadius

Genus of lichens

Appressodiscus is a small genus of lichen-forming fungi in the family Ramalinaceae. It comprises two species. The genus was circumscribed in 2023 by André Aptroot and Lidiane Alves dos Santos. Both species are found in Brazil, where they grow as corticolous (bark-dwelling) crustose lichens. Characteristics of the genus include flat apothecia (fruiting bodies), an excipulum with a prosoplectenchymatous tissue structure, eight-spored asci with an ocular chamber, and simple (non-septate) ascospores. Appressodiscus has a sister relationship with the genus Phyllopsora.
