= Lopezaria =

Scientific classification
- Domain: Eukaryota
- Kingdom: Fungi
- Division: Ascomycota
- Class: Lecanoromycetes
- Order: Lecanorales
- Family: Ramalinaceae
- Genus: Lopezaria; Kalb & Hafellner (1990)

Type species
- Lopezaria versicolor (Flot.) Kalb & Hafellner (1990)

Species
- L. isidiza L. versicolor

Genus of lichens

Lopezaria is a genus of lichenized fungi in the family Ramalinaceae.

The genus name of Lopezaria is in honour of Manuel López-Figueiras (1915-2012), who was a (Spanish-) Venezuelan botanist (Mycology and Lichenology), from the University of Havana (in Cuba).

The genus was circumscribed by Klaus Kalb and Josef Hafellner in Lich. Neotropici fasc. XI, vol.2 in 1990.
