= Compsocladium =

Scientific classification
- Domain: Eukaryota
- Kingdom: Fungi
- Division: Ascomycota
- Class: Lecanoromycetes
- Order: Lecanorales
- Family: Ramalinaceae
- Genus: Compsocladium; I.M.Lamb (1956)

Type species
- Compsocladium archboldianum I.M.Lamb (1956)

Species
- C. archboldianum C. kalbii

Genus of lichens

Compsocladium is a genus of lichen-forming fungi in the family Ramalinaceae. It has two species.

== Species ==
- Compsocladium archboldianum I.M.Lamb (1956)
- Compsocladium kalbii Frisch (2007)
