= Jarmania =

Scientific classification
- Kingdom: Fungi
- Division: Ascomycota
- Class: Lecanoromycetes
- Order: Lecanorales
- Family: Ramalinaceae
- Genus: Jarmania; Kantvilas (1996)

Type species
- Jarmania tristis Kantvilas

Species
- J. scoliciosporoides J. tristis

Single-species fungal genus

Jarmania is a small genus of lichen-forming fungi in the family Ramalinaceae. The genus was established in 1996 and contains two species that are both found only in Tasmania. These lichens grow as cottony mats on the bark of trees in cool rainforests, where they favour the sheltered undersides of trunks and branches.

== Taxonomy ==
Jarmania was initially a monospecific genus, erected in 1996 to accommodate the Tasmanian corticolous species Jarmania tristis. The morphology of its Bacidia-type asci prompted the placement the genus in the Bacidiaceae (order Lecanorales). Chemical data also distinguish Jarmania, which produces grayanic acid together with traces of usnic and 4-O-demethylgrayanic acids, lichen substances otherwise rare or absent in the Bacidiaceae. In 2008, Kantvilas transferred Tasmanian collections formerly placed in Scoliciosporum pruinosum to a newly described second species, Jarmania scoliciosporoides. This lichen has a pale grey-white thallus, lobaric (not grayanic) acid, and much smaller acicular (needle-like) ascospores (21–35 μm long) than J. tristis (36–60 μm).

The family Badicideaceae has since been synonymised with Ramalinaceae, and so Jarmania is now a member of the latter family.

== Description ==
The thallus forms irregular colonies up to about 10 cm across. Centrally it develops a coarse, granular-crustose surface, while the margin retains the characteristic whitish to pale yellow-green cottony (byssoid) texture; this peripheral mat often appears slightly bluish-grey. Its photobiont is a unicellular green alga with spherical cells 6–9 μm in diameter that may cluster into clumps up to 22 μm wide. Fungal hyphae are 2–3.5 μm wide with narrow lumina.

Jarmania scoliciosporoides, described in 2008, shares the genus's byssoid–leprose habit and Bacidia-type asci but is distinguished by its pale grey-white thallus, epruinose, pale pink-to-orange, subglobose apothecia, and shorter acicular ascospores (21–35 × 1–2 μm); it is also the first Jarmania known to form immersed pycnidia that release bacilliform conidia 3–5 × 0.5 μm; chemically it contains lobaric acid with trace gyrophoric acid rather than the grayanic-series depsidones present in J. tristis.

In J. tristis, apothecia (fruiting bodies) are immarginate, strongly convex to almost spherical from the outset, 0.2–0.75 mm in diameter, and covered by a yellowish pruina matching the thallus; they are scattered or occasionally grouped. A true excipulum is visible only in very young fruits and is soon excluded. The colourless hymenium is 60–80 μm thick and amyloid. Asci are eight-spored, narrowly cylindrical (52–72 × 7.5–10 μm), with a strongly amyloid tholus and poorly developed ocular chamber. Paraphyses are 0.75–1(–2) μm thick, densely intertwined and tapering apically. Ascospores are hyaline, filiform to sigmoid, 36–60 × 1–2 μm, with two to four indistinct septa concentrated toward the broader end; they remain tightly coiled after release. Chemically the thallus reacts PD+ and K+ (yellow-orange) and fluoresces bright purple under UV owing to grayanic-series compounds.

== Habitat and distribution ==
Both known species of Jarmania are endemic to Tasmania. J. tristis occurs at low to mid elevations, almost always below about 550 m above sea level, in cool-temperate rainforest of the thamnic and implicate structural types or in early successional sclerophyll stages of that vegetation. An isolated population in north-eastern Tasmania inhabits an atypical Nothofagus–Phyllocladus stand that is otherwise species poor, underscoring the lichen’s value as a bioindicator of shrubby rainforest.

The species is strictly corticolous, favouring the sheltered undersides of leaning trunks and branches where it derives moisture primarily from humid air. Substrates recorded include Anodopetalum biglandulosum, Anopterus biglandulosus, Cenarrhenes nitida, Monotoca glauca, Nothofagus cunninghamii, Phyllocladus aspleniifolius, Tasmannia lanceolata and Eucryphia milliganii. It tends to occupy depauperate microhabitats with few associated lichens, though species such as Psoroma and Pseudocyphellaria may encroach from moister upper trunk surfaces; the fungus Chaenothecopsis tasmanica has been observed parasitising some thalli.

Jarmania scoliciosporoides is rarer and occurs at higher elevations, usually from about 600 m up to the sub-alpine zone. It inhabits cool-temperate rainforest dominated almost exclusively by Nothofagus cunninghamii, where the understorey is very open. The lichen grows on the sheltered undersides of young limbs and twigs, protected from direct rain; associated species in this species-poor microhabitat include Zwackhia viridis, Porina hyperleptalea and Porina leptalea. It does not persist once the bark matures and becomes colonised by hydrophobic crustose lichens such as Sagenidium molle and Lecanactis abietina.
