= Tamasia =

Scientific classification
- Kingdom: Fungi
- Division: Ascomycota
- Class: Lecanoromycetes
- Order: Lecanorales
- Family: Ramalinaceae
- Genus: Tamasia; Farkas (2023)
- Species: T. fijiensis

Binomial name
- Tamasia fijiensis Farkas (2023)

Genus of lichens

Tamasia is a fungal genus in the family Ramalinaceae. It comprises the single species Tamasia fijiensis, a foliicolous (leaf-dwelling) crustose lichen.

== Taxonomy ==
The genus Tamasia was circumscribed by the Hungarian lichenologist Edit Éva Farkas in 2023, who named it in honour of the Hungarian botanist Tamás Pócs, an expert on tropical plants and cryptogamic organisms.

The genus differs from the related Bacidina by having wider 1-septate ascospores and a characteristic ascus apex structure. It can be distinguished from Megalaria by its different hymenial pigmentation, exciple structure, and thin-walled ascospores with slight constrictions at the septa.

The type specimen was collected in 2003 from mossy elfin forest at an elevation of 990–1,010 metres on Viti Levu, Fiji. At the time of its original publication, the genus was known only from its type locality in Fiji, giving it a restricted Paleotropical distribution.

== Description ==
Tamasia fijiensis is a foliicolous lichen, meaning it grows on the surface of living leaves. It forms a distinctive violet-coloured crust on its leaf substrate. This violet colouration comes from its photobiont (the photosynthetic partner in the lichen symbiosis), which is a cyanobacterium belonging to the genus Rhizonema. The surface of the lichen appears slightly rough and uneven, with wavy lines created by chains of these cyanobacterial cells.

The reproductive structures (apothecia) are small, disc-shaped organs measuring 0.3–0.4 millimetres across. These appear as pale orange to cream-coloured discs attached directly to the lichen's surface. Each disc is surrounded by a rim (called an exciple) that is made up of tightly packed fungal cells, giving it a tissue-like appearance under the microscope.

Inside the apothecia, the fungal partner produces spores within elongated sacs called asci. These asci have a distinctive internal structure that can be seen when stained with iodine solution, showing a characteristic pattern (known as the Tamasia-type) that helps distinguish this genus from its relatives. The asci are interspersed with thread-like structures called paraphyses, which are usually unbranched but occasionally split near their tips, where they become noticeably thickened.

Each ascus contains eight spores. These spores are elliptical in shape and divided into two cells by a single cross-wall (septum), measuring 6–8 micrometres long by 3–4 micrometres wide. The spores have relatively thin walls and show a slight pinching at the septum.

== Habitat and distribution ==
Tamasia fijiensis is known only from a single location in Fiji, specifically from the cloud forests of Viti Levu, the largest island in the Fijian archipelago. The species was first discovered in 2003 in what is known locally as mossy elfin forest, a distinctive type of tropical montane forest characterised by its low canopy and abundance of epiphytes.

The type locality where the species was found lies at an elevation of 990–1,010 metres above sea level. At this altitude, the forest is frequently enveloped in clouds, creating consistently humid conditions that are particularly favourable for foliicolous lichens. The forest canopy in this habitat is dominated by Cyathea tree ferns and Alpinia boia, a tall member of the ginger family that grows to 3–4 metres in height.

As a foliicolous lichen, T. fijiensis grows on the living leaves of vascular plants in the understory of this cloud forest, though the specific host plant species has not been identified. This highly specialised habitat requirement, combined with its currently known restricted range, suggests that T. fijiensis may be endemic to the high-altitude forests of Fiji. However, similar high-elevation tropical forests exist elsewhere in the South Pacific region, and future surveys may reveal the species to be present in other locations.
