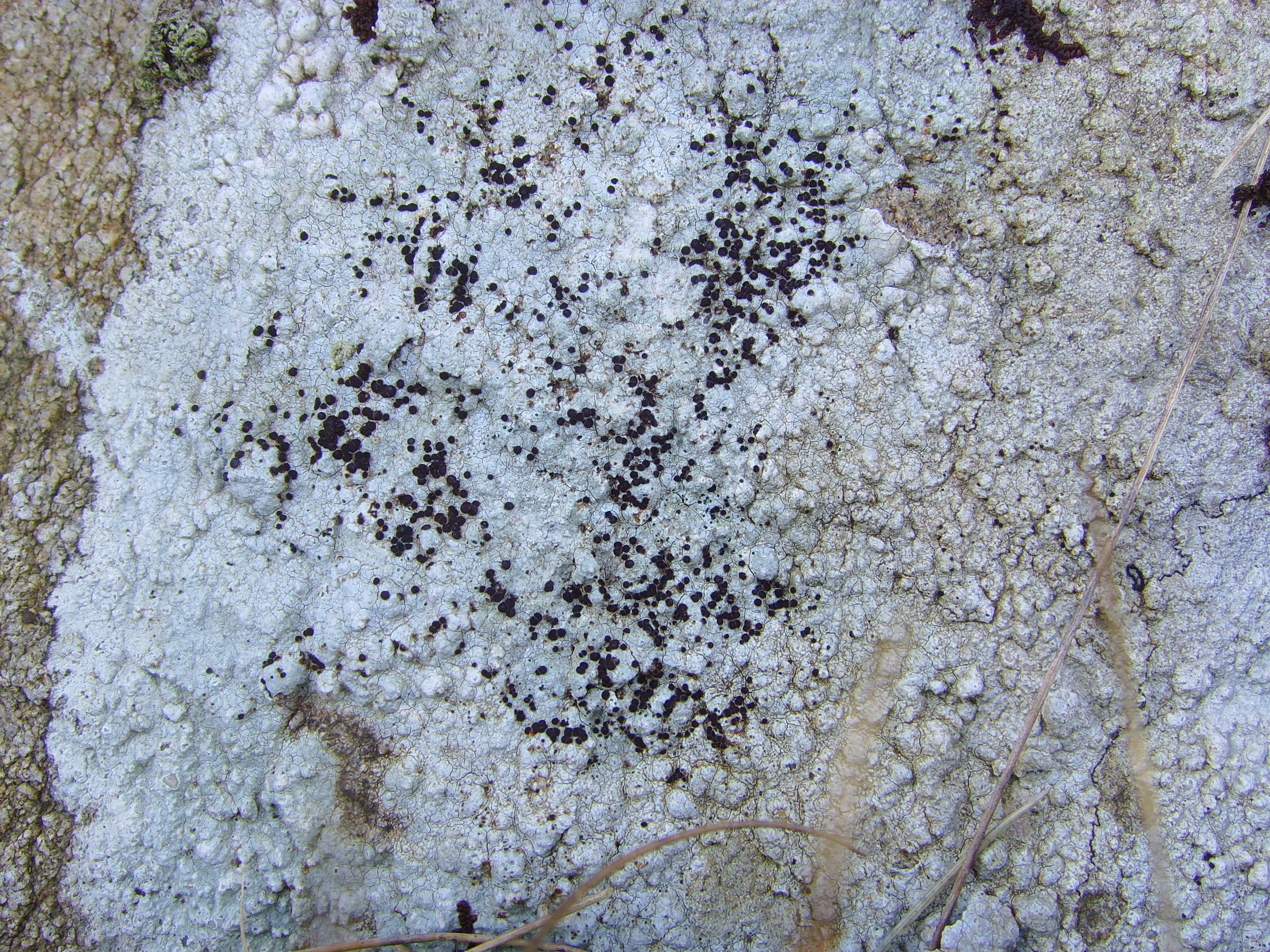
- Herteliana gagei

Scientific classification
- Domain: Eukaryota
- Kingdom: Fungi
- Division: Ascomycota
- Class: Lecanoromycetes
- Order: Lecanorales
- Family: Ramalinaceae
- Genus: Herteliana; P.James (1980)

Type species
- Herteliana taylorii (Salwey) P.James (1980)

Species
- H. alaskensis H. australis H. gagei H. schuyleriana

= Herteliana =

Genus of lichen-forming fungi

Herteliana is a genus of lichen-forming fungi. It contains four species of crustose lichens.

== Taxonomy ==
The genus was circumscribed by the lichenologist Peter Wilfred James in 1980. The genus name honours the German teacher and lichenologist Hannes Hertel.

James originally classified the genus in the family Lecideaceae, but it has since been included in the Ramalinaceae (2017), and, more recently (2022), in the Cladoniaceae. This is because in 2014, it was shown using molecular phylogenetics that Herteliana taylorii grouped together in a clade with Squamarina, and should thus be excluded from the Ramalinaceae and transferred elsewhere in the Lecanorales; the authors concomitantly recommended resurrecting the family Squamarinaceae (originally proposed by Josef Hafellner in 1984) to contain Herteliana and Squamarina. In 2018, Kraichuk and colleagues proposed to fold the Squamarinaceae into the Cladoniaceae, a taxonomic suggestion that had been accepted by later authors.

The original type species assigned by James, H. taylorii, is now considered synonymous with H. gagei.

== Description ==
The thallus (the body of the lichen) of Herteliana is crust-like. The apothecia (fruiting bodies) can be either embedded within the thallus or sit directly on its surface, are spherical (globose), and have a distinct margin. The excipulum (the outer layer of the apothecium) is made up of tightly packed cells that resemble plant tissue (pseudoparenchymatous). The hypothecium(the layer below the spore-producing area) extends significantly and forms a root-like structure, and is nearly colourless.

The paraphyses (sterile filaments within the apothecia) have swollen tips, are mostly unbranched, but sometimes they branch and reconnect. The asci (spore-producing sacs) resemble those in the genus Lecanora and typically contain eight spores. The ascospores are broadly spindle-shaped, simple (not divided by septa), and colourless.

The pycnidia (structures that produce asexual spores) are embedded in the thallus, and the conidia (asexual spores) are formed at the tips, are sickle-shaped, simple, and colourless.

== Species ==
- Herteliana alaskensis (Nyl.) S.Ekman (1996)
- Herteliana australis Fryday (2004) – New Zealand Subantarctic Islands
- Herteliana gagei (Sm.) J.R.Laundon (2005)
- Herteliana schuyleriana Lendemer (2016) – northeastern North America
