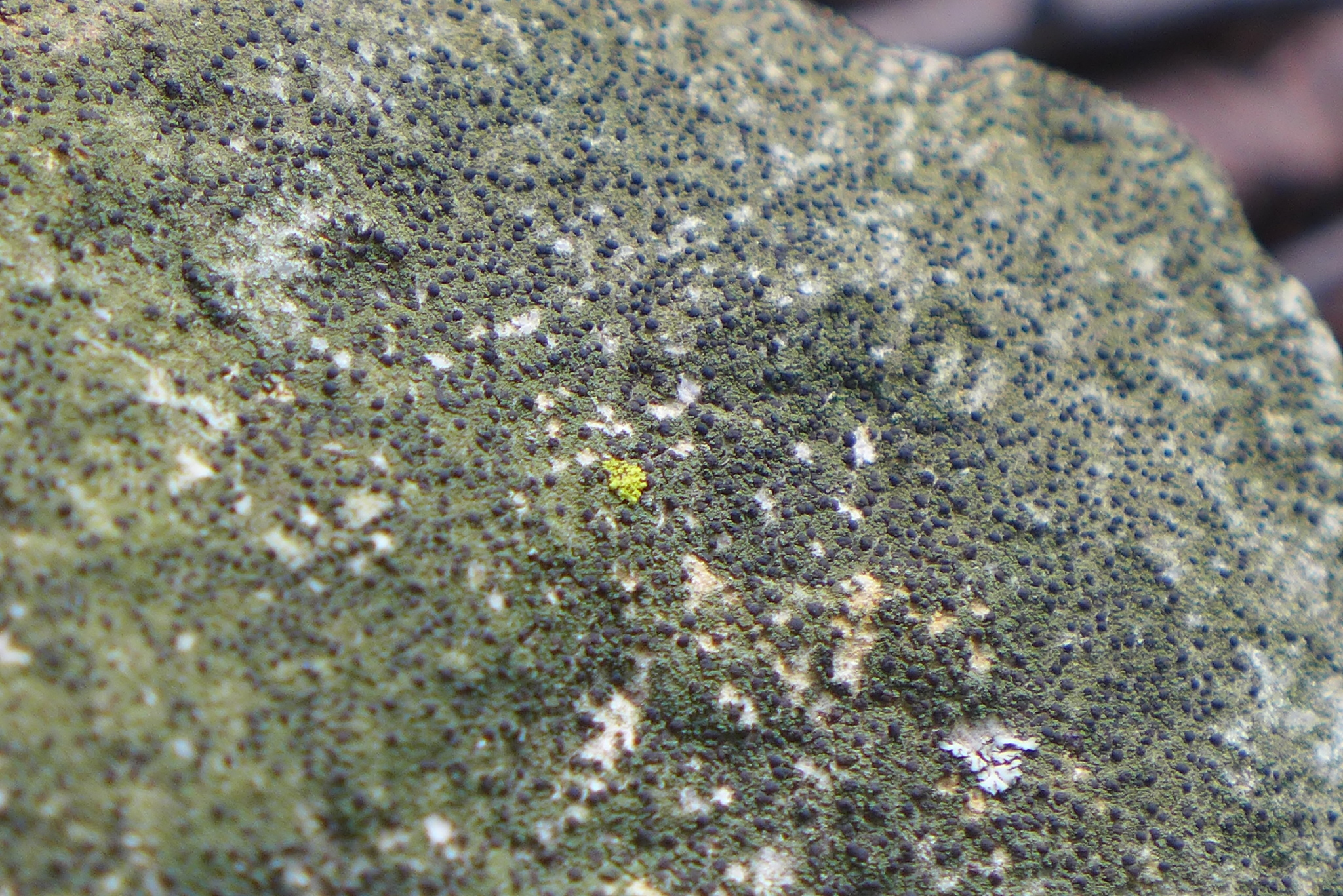
- Toniniopsis coprodes

Scientific classification
- Domain: Eukaryota
- Kingdom: Fungi
- Division: Ascomycota
- Class: Lecanoromycetes
- Order: Lecanorales
- Family: Ramalinaceae
- Genus: Toniniopsis; Frey (1926)

Type species
- Toniniopsis obscura Frey (1926)

= Toniniopsis =

Genus of lichens

Toniniopsis is a genus of crustose and squamulose lichens in the family Ramalinaceae. The genus was circumscribed by Swiss lichenologist Eduard Frey in 1926, with Toniniopsis obscura designated the type and only species. The genus name of Toniniopsis is in honour of Carlo Tonini (1803–1877), who was an Italian chemist and botanist (Lichenology), who worked in Verona and was a member and President of the Academy of Agriculture. As a result of molecular phylogenetic studies, several species, formerly classified in genus Bacidia, have been transferred to Toniniopsis.

== Species ==
- Toniniopsis aromatica (Sm.) Kistenich, Timdal, Bendiksby & S.Ekman (2018)
- Toniniopsis bagliettoana (A.Massal. & De Not.) Kistenich & Timdal (2021)
- Toniniopsis coelestina (Anzi) Kistenich, Timdal, Bendiksby & S.Ekman (2018)
- Toniniopsis coprodes (Körb.) S.Ekman & Coppins (2021)
- Toniniopsis cretica (Timdal) Timdal (2018)
- Toniniopsis dissimilis Gerasimova & A.Beck (2021)
- Toniniopsis fusispora (Hepp ex Körb.) Cl.Roux (2020)
- Toniniopsis illudens (Nyl.) Kistenich, Timdal, Bendiksby & S.Ekman (2018)
- Toniniopsis inornata (Nyl.) S.Ekman & Coppins (2021)
- Toniniopsis mesoidea (Nyl.) Timdal (2018)
- Toniniopsis obscura Frey (1926)
- Toniniopsis separabilis (Nyl.) Gerasimova & A.Beck (2021)
- Toniniopsis subincompta (Nyl.) Kistenich, Timdal, Bendiksby & S.Ekman (2018)
- Toniniopsis verrucarioides (Nyl.) Kistenich, Timdal, Bendiksby & S.Ekman (2018)
