= Cenozosia =

Scientific classification
- Domain: Eukaryota
- Kingdom: Fungi
- Division: Ascomycota
- Class: Lecanoromycetes
- Order: Lecanorales
- Family: Ramalinaceae
- Genus: Cenozosia; A.Massal. (1854)

Type species
- Cenozosia inanis (Mont.) A.Massal. (1854)

Genus of lichen-forming fungi

Cenozosia is a genus of lichen-forming fungi in the family Ramalinaceae.
