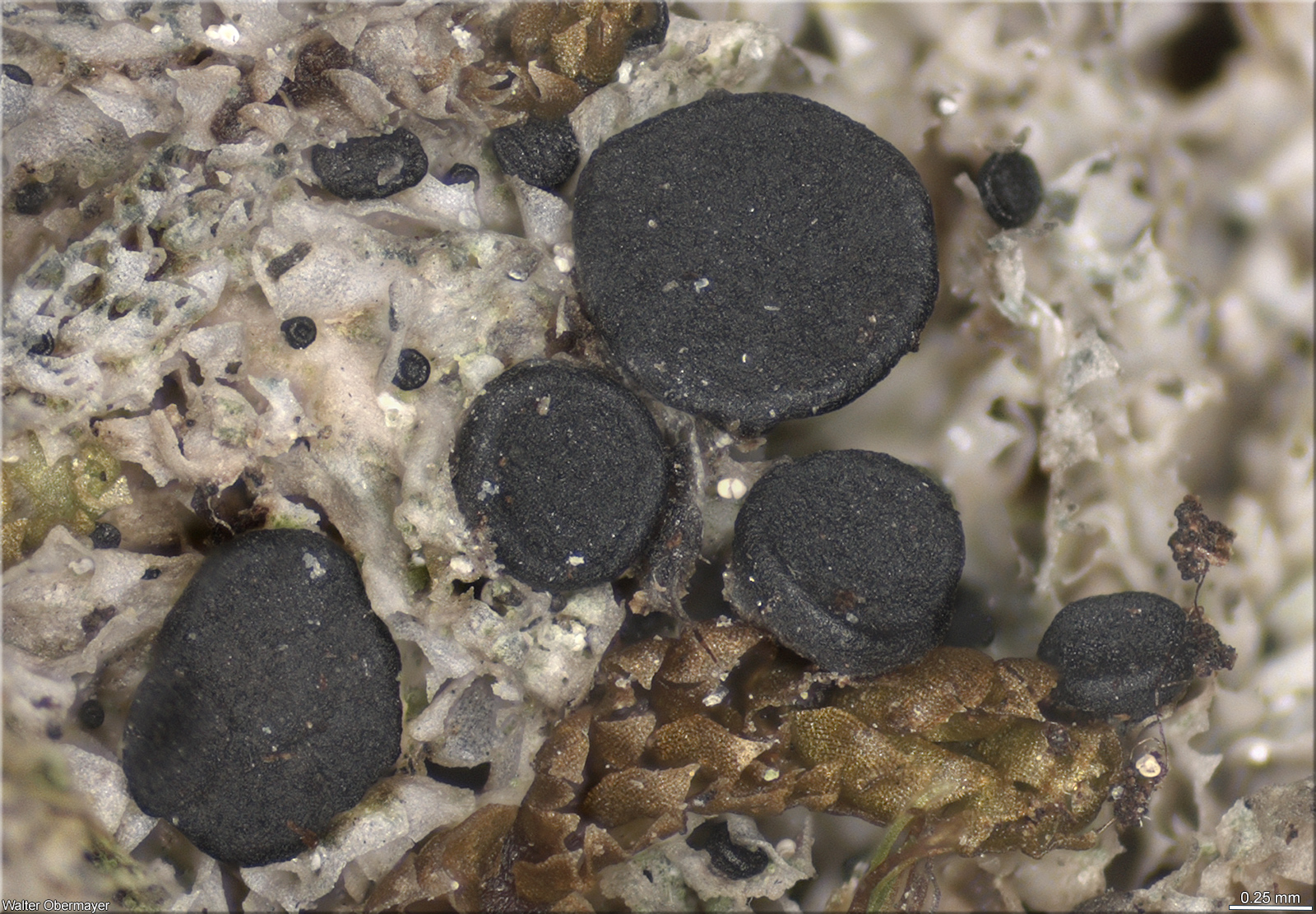
- Apothecia of Schadonia alpina

Scientific classification
- Kingdom: Fungi
- Division: Ascomycota
- Class: Lecanoromycetes
- Order: Lecanorales
- Family: Ramalinaceae
- Genus: Schadonia; Körb. (1859)

Type species
- Schadonia alpina Körb. (1859)

Species
- S. alpina S. fecunda S. indica

= Schadonia =

Genus of lichen-forming fungi

Schadonia is a genus of lichen-forming fungi. Established by German lichenologist Gustav Wilhelm Körber in 1859, this genus of crustose lichens is characterised by its black, sessile apothecia (fruiting bodies), muriform ascospores, and growth on mosses, plant debris, and rocks in montane habitats. While traditionally placed in the family Ramalinaceae, recent studies have suggested its classification may be uncertain within the order Lecanorales, with some researchers proposing its placement in the Ectolechiaceae or the resurrection of the family Schadoniaceae. The genus currently comprises three recognised species.

== Taxonomy ==
The genus was established by the German lichenologist Gustav Wilhelm Körber, with S. alpina assigned as the type species.

Although Schadonia has traditionally been placed in the family Ramalinaceae, in some more recent publications it is classified in the Pilocarpaceae (this family is now synonymized with Ectolechiaceae). In the 2024 Revisions of British and Irish Lichens series, the genus Schadonia is described as having an "uncertain position within the Lecanorales", and the possibility of resurrecting the family Schadoniaceae, originally proposed by Josef Hafellner in 1984, is mentioned. In the first comprehensive molecular phylogeny of the Ramalinaceae, published in 2018, Kistenich and colleagues determined that Schadonia fecunda fell outside of the Ramalinaceae, and suggested the possible exclusion of the genus from the family.

== Description ==
Schadonia is a genus of crustose lichens, meaning it forms a crust-like growth that adheres tightly to the substrate. The thallus (the lichen body) can vary from scurfy (flaky) and warty to a more coral-like form, spreading over the surface it grows on. Some species also produce soredia, which are powdery structures used for reproduction. In this genus, the photosynthetic partner is a green alga of the chlorococcoid type, comprising small, round cells.

The fruiting bodies of Schadonia, the apothecia, are black, disc-shaped structures that sit directly on the surface of the lichen without a stalk (sessile) and are slightly constricted at the base. The disc is typically concave to flat, and there is no thalline margin (a rim made from the lichen's body). Surrounding the apothecia is a prominent true exciple, a structure made up of cells arranged in a radial pattern, giving it an even or slightly wavy appearance.

Underneath the apothecia, the hypothecium (a supporting layer) is dark. The inner structure of the apothecia contains paraphyses—thin, branched filaments that help separate the spore-producing cells. These paraphyses are not thickened at their tips. The asci (spore-producing sacs) typically hold between one and eight spores and are cylindrical to club-shaped. When treated with a chemical solution of potassium iodide (K/I+), the spore sacs stain blue, a feature characteristic of the Bacidia-type asci. The ascospores are ellipsoidal, richly muriform (divided into many compartments by internal walls), and colourless (hyaline).

Conidiomata (asexual spore-producing structures) have not been observed in Schadonia. No lichen substances have been detected through thin-layer chromatography.

== Habitat ==
Species of Schadonia are typically found growing on mosses, plant debris, and rocks in montane (mountainous) habitats.

== Species ==
- Schadonia alpina Körb. (1859)
- Schadonia fecunda (Th.Fr.) Vězda & Poelt (1980) – Sweden
- Schadonia indica Upreti & Nayaka (2006) – Madhya Pradesh, India

The taxon Schadonia subobscurata (Vain.) Kalb (1983) has been transferred to the genus Brigantiaea, as Brigantiaea subobscurata. Schadonia saulskellyana Lendemer & Hollinger (2023) was transferred to the newly erected genus Karinomyces (Ectolechiaceae) in 2026.
