= Vandenboomia =

Scientific classification
- Domain: Eukaryota
- Kingdom: Fungi
- Division: Ascomycota
- Class: Lecanoromycetes
- Order: Lecanorales
- Family: Ramalinaceae
- Genus: Vandenboomia; S.Y.Kondr. (2019)

Type species
- Vandenboomia chlorotiza (Nyl.) S.Y.Kondr. (2019)

Species
- V. chlorotiza V. falcata

Genus of lichens

Vandenboomia is a small genus of lichen-forming fungi in the family Ramalinaceae. It has two species. The genus was circumscribed by the Ukrainian lichenologist Sergey Kondratyuk in 2019, with V. chlorotiza assigned as the type species. The genus name honours the Dutch lichenologist Pieter P. G. Van den Boom.

== Description ==
Vandenboomia species are characterised by their reproductive structures, which include both sexual (apothecia) and asexual (pycnidia) forms. The apothecia, which are small cup-like fungal fruiting bodies, measure between 0.1 and 0.3 mm in diameter. These structures are partially sunken into the lichen surface or sitting slightly above it, and appear somewhat rounded and convex, sometimes with a bumpy surface. They are coloured either bright pink or display a mottled brownish pattern. The apothecia lack the typical rim of algal cells (known as a thalline exciple) that is common in many other lichens.

Inside the apothecia, the spore-producing layer (hymenium) is 25 to 40 μm tall. The spores produced in these structures (ascospores) are elongated, measuring between 9 and 18 μm long (most commonly 10–12) and 2–3 μm wide, and may be either undivided or split into two cells by a central septum.

The genus also produces two different types of asexual reproductive structures (pycnidia). The smaller type measures up to 50 μm in diameter and produces curved or hook-shaped microscopic spores (microconidia) that are 7–10 μm long and 0.5 μm wide. The larger type ranges from 70 to 160 μm in diameter, has pale, open pores, and produces straight, cylinder-shaped spores (macroconidia) measuring 3–6 μm long and 1–2 μm wide.

== Habitat and distribution ==
The genus Vandenboomia is found in sheltered locations, particularly in woodland areas and near water bodies. These lichens show a preference for heavily shaded environments, typically growing on bark with a basic pH. They are especially common on elm (Ulmus), ash (Fraxinus), and willow (Salix) trees, and can often be found inside tree hollows.

The genus comprises two rare species with limited geographical ranges. Vandenboomia chlorotiza is found in Atlantic regions of Europe, with documented occurrences in England, France, Denmark, and Norway. The second species, V. falcata, is known only from the Canary Islands, a Spanish archipelago off the coast of North Africa.

== Species ==
- Vandenboomia chlorotiza (Nyl.) S.Y.Kondr. (2019) – Atlantic Europe (England, France Denmark, Norway)
- Vandenboomia falcata (van den Boom, M.Brand, Coppins, Magain & Sérus.) S.Y.Kondr. (2019) – Atlantic North Africa
