= Johann Adam Philipp Hepp =

German physician and botanist (1797–1867)

Johann Adam Philipp Hepp (26 October 1797, in Kaiserslautern – 5 February 1867, in Frankfurt am Main) was a German medical doctor and lichenologist.

He studied medicine at the University of Würzburg, and from 1826 worked as a doctor in Neustadt an der Haardt. Because of his activities during the German revolutionary period of 1848–49, he was forced to move to Switzerland, where he lived in exile for the rest of his life. In Switzerland, he devoted his time to lichenological research, and in 1857 started to publish an exsiccata work on European lichens titled Die Flechten Europas in getrockneten mikroskopisch untersuchten Exemplaren mit Beschreibung und Abbildung ihrer Sporen. He died on 5 February 1867 while visiting his daughter in Frankfurt.

== Honours ==
The mycological family Heppiaceae commemorates his name, as does the lichen genus Heppia (Nägeli ex A.Massal, 1854), the botanical genus Heppiella (Regel, 1853; family Gesneriaceae), the fungal genus Neoheppia (Zahlbr., 1909), and Heppsora is a genus of lichenized fungi, (in the family Ramalinaceae D.D. Awasthi & Kr.P. Singh, 1977).
