= Ramalinopsis =

Scientific classification
- Domain: Eukaryota
- Kingdom: Fungi
- Division: Ascomycota
- Class: Lecanoromycetes
- Order: Lecanorales
- Family: Ramalinaceae
- Genus: Ramalinopsis
- Species: R. mannii

Binomial name
- Ramalinopsis mannii Follmann & Huneck

Genus of fungi

Ramalinopsis is a genus of lichenized fungi in the family Ramalinaceae. This is a monotypic genus, containing the single species Ramalinopsis mannii.
