= Lithocalla =

Scientific classification
- Domain: Eukaryota
- Kingdom: Fungi
- Division: Ascomycota
- Class: Lecanoromycetes
- Order: Lecanorales
- Family: Ramalinaceae
- Genus: Lithocalla; Orange (2020)

Type species
- Lithocalla ecorticata (J.R.Laundon) Orange (2020)

Species
- L. ecorticata L. malouina

Genus of lichens

Lithocalla is a small genus of lichen-forming fungi in the family Ramalinaceae. It comprises two known species that form crust-like growths with a powdery texture on rocks. The genus was established in 2020 based on genetic analysis of species previously classified under different genera. Lithocalla lichens are characterised by their pale yellow-green colour and their preference for sheltered, shaded rock surfaces. They lack visible reproductive structures and likely spread through fragmentation. The two species have distinct geographical distributions: L. ecorticata is found mainly in Great Britain and Norway, while L. malouina is native to the Falkland Islands.

== Taxonomy ==
The genus Lithocalla was erected in 2020 by Alan Orange to accommodate two species of leprose lichens containing usnic acid. It is placed in the family Ramalinaceae, order Lecanorales, though its exact phylogenetic position within the family remains uncertain. The genus name Lithocalla is derived from the Greek words lithos meaning stone, and callos meaning beauty. This name alludes to the attractive pale yellow colonies these lichens form on rock overhangs. The name has a Latin termination and is treated as feminine in grammatical gender.

Lithocalla was established based on molecular phylogenetic analysis of the type species, L. ecorticata, which was previously classified as Lecanora ecorticata. The analysis suggested it belonged in Ramalinaceae but was distinct from other genera in the family. A second closely related species from the Falkland Islands, previously known as Lepraria malouina, was also transferred to the new genus as Lithocalla malouina.

== Description ==
Lithocalla species form crustose (crust-like) lichens with a leprose texture, meaning they have a powdery or granular appearance without a clearly defined structure. The thallus, which is the main body of the lichen, develops from small, separate granules that eventually merge to form a continuous crust. In mature specimens, this crust can reach up to 2 mm in thickness and may develop cracks. The granules making up the thallus are very fine, measuring 60–100 μm in diameter. They lack a cortex (a protective outer layer) and do not have projecting hyphae (fungal filaments). The lower parts of the thallus consist of decolorised granules, while a medulla (inner layer) and hypothallus (underlying structure) are absent.

In some shaded environments, a prothallus (a thin, spreading structure that precedes the development of the main thallus) may be visible, though it is usually sparse or absent. The thallus colour is typically pale yellow-green, although it can appear blue-grey in deeply shaded areas. This colouration is due to the presence of usnic acid, a characteristic lichen substance found in Lithocalla species.

Lithocalla lichens do not produce visible reproductive structures. Both ascomata (fungal fruiting bodies) and conidiomata (structures producing asexual spores) are unknown in this genus, indicating that these lichens likely reproduce primarily through vegetative means, such as thallus fragmentation. The photobiont, or algal partner in the lichen symbiosis, is a green alga, though the specific genus has not been identified.

== Habitat and distribution ==
Lithocalla comprises two known species, each with distinct geographical distributions and slightly different habitat preferences. Lithocalla ecorticata is predominantly found in Great Britain, particularly in the north and west. It has also been confirmed in southwestern Norway. This species favours siliceous (silicon-rich) rocks, typically inhabiting rain-sheltered areas. It is particularly adept at colonising deeply sheltered cavities, often forming pure stands in these locations. L. ecorticata can be found from sea level up to at least 480 m (1,570 ft) altitude in North Wales, with confirmed Norwegian specimens occurring as high as 640 m (2,100 ft). It is frequently observed on drystone walls in woodland settings, where it characteristically highlights recesses with its pale yellow coloration.

Lithocalla malouina, in contrast, is endemic to the Falkland Islands. It occupies a similar ecological niche to its British counterpart, growing on shaded and rain-sheltered siliceous rocks and stones. However, L. malouina shows a preference for south-facing overhangs, where it can often be found on rocks and stones beneath these protective structures.

While reports of Lithocalla (particularly under its former classifications) have emerged from various parts of the world, including other European countries, Asia, North America, and Antarctica, these records require confirmation. The true global distribution of the genus remains uncertain, and further research is needed to verify its presence in these regions.
