= Auriculora =

Scientific classification
- Domain: Eukaryota
- Kingdom: Fungi
- Division: Ascomycota
- Class: Lecanoromycetes
- Order: Lecanorales
- Family: Ramalinaceae
- Genus: Auriculora; Kalb (1988)
- Species: A. byssomorpha

Binomial name
- Auriculora byssomorpha (Nyl.) Kalb (1988)

Single-species lichen genus

Auriculora is a fungal genus in the family Ramalinaceae. It comprises the single species Auriculora byssomorpha, a tropical crustose lichen. Both the genus and its species were described in 1988 by the German lichenologist Klaus Kalb. The main characteristic of Auriculora is the ear-like appendages at the margins of the apothecia (fruiting bodies).

== Description ==
Auriculora is characterised by a crustose, cortex-lacking thallus containing green algae of the genus Protococcus. The thallus is byssoid to granular and may be fringed by a well-developed filamentous prothallus. It shows distinct zonation, with a byssoid basal layer of loosely interwoven, thick-walled hyphae and a more compact upper layer enclosing the photobiont. The thallus occasionally develops two separate algal layers. The ascomata (fruiting bodies) are rounded, thinly marginate or unmarginate, with black, non-pruinose discs covered by a hyphose layer. This layer eventually peels away, leaving an amphithecium that resembles an ear-shaped structure, which inspired the genus name.

The pycnidia are patelliform (shaped like a small, shallow dish) and semi-immersed, with a dark olive-brown wall that does not react to KOH. The conidiophores are simple or slightly branched, producing rod-like conidia that measure about 10 μm in length. The asci are club-shaped (clavate), long-cylindrical, eight-spored, and similar in structure to those found in the family Lecanoraceae. The outer wall layer and apical ring of the asci are strongly amyloid. Ascospores are hyaline, fusiform, and transversely three-septate. Paraphyses are simple (unbranched), septate, approximately 2 μm thick, and only slightly or not at all thickened at their tips. The hypothecium is dark brown, and the amphithecium is composed of radiating, cartilage-like hyphae with an ochre hue.

Chemical analysis of A. byssomorpha reveals a complex secondary metabolite profile. Thin-layer chromatography studies have identified five distinct compounds: two uncharacterised substances and three triterpenes. These compounds manifest as brown crystals that accumulate on the hyphal walls throughout both the thallus and generative tissues, contributing to the lichen's characteristic dark pigmentation. The crystals are particularly dense in the upper thallus layer, though absent from the bright rim where hyphae are adglutinated at the surface.

== Development ==
Auriculora byssomorpha has a unique developmental pattern in its fruiting bodies that distinguishes it from all other known lichenised fungi. The apothecia begin development with a dark-pigmented generative tissue surrounding spirally coiled ascogonia. This develops into a compact, globose structure with a lighter-coloured, gelatinous centre where ascogenous hyphae accumulate in the upper portion.

The initial hymenium develops in a gymnocarpous manner (openly exposed), with the first paraphyses and asci pushing aside the dark mantle layer. However, what makes Auriculora remarkable is its subsequent development: new hymenia repeatedly form beneath older ones within the subhymenial layer, a pattern not observed in other lichens. Each new hymenium typically develops first at one side beneath the older one, eventually forming a complete new layer except at the outermost margin.

As new hymenia develop, they are usually smaller than their predecessors and do not entirely replace them. The older hymenial tissue often becomes turned backward into an inverse position, with portions remaining attached to the apothecial margin or disc. These remnants form distinctive ear-like appendages (which inspired the genus name) or create superimposed layers of tissue. In mature specimens, these remnants may form a sheath around the apothecial margin and disc. The regenerative capacity of the apothecia appears to decrease with age, as successively formed hymenia become progressively smaller. In older specimens, the remnants of disintegrating marginal tissues become correspondingly larger, eventually forming an outer marginal sheath and an inner ring around the diminishing disc.

This pattern of repeated endogenous development represents a unique form of secondary hemiangiocarpy, where the covering layer derives from hymenial/subhymenial tissue rather than from vegetative or generative tissue as in other lichen groups. This developmental pattern is considered a defining characteristic of the genus and sets it apart from all other known lichenised ascomycetes.

== Habitat and distribution ==
Auriculora byssomorpha was originally described from collections made in Brazil. Since then, the lichen has also been reported from Kenya, Tanzania, and Costa Rica.
