= Rolfidium =

Scientific classification
- Domain: Eukaryota
- Kingdom: Fungi
- Division: Ascomycota
- Class: Lecanoromycetes
- Order: Lecanorales
- Family: Ramalinaceae
- Genus: Rolfidium; Moberg

Type species
- Rolfidium peltatum Moberg

Genus of fungi

Rolfidium is a genus of lichenized fungi in the family Ramalinaceae.

The genus was circumscribed by Jan Roland Moberg in Lichenologist vol.18 (4) on page 305 in 1986.

The genus name of Rolfidium is in honour of Rolf Santesson (1916–2013), who was a Swedish lichenologist and university lecturer.

== Species ==
As accepted by Species Fungorum;

- Rolfidium bumammum (Nyl.) Kistenich, Timdal, Bendiksby & S. Ekman (2018)
- Rolfidium nigropallidum (Nyl. ex Hue) Kistenich, Timdal, Bendiksby & S. Ekman (2018)
- Rolfidium peltatum Moberg (1986)
