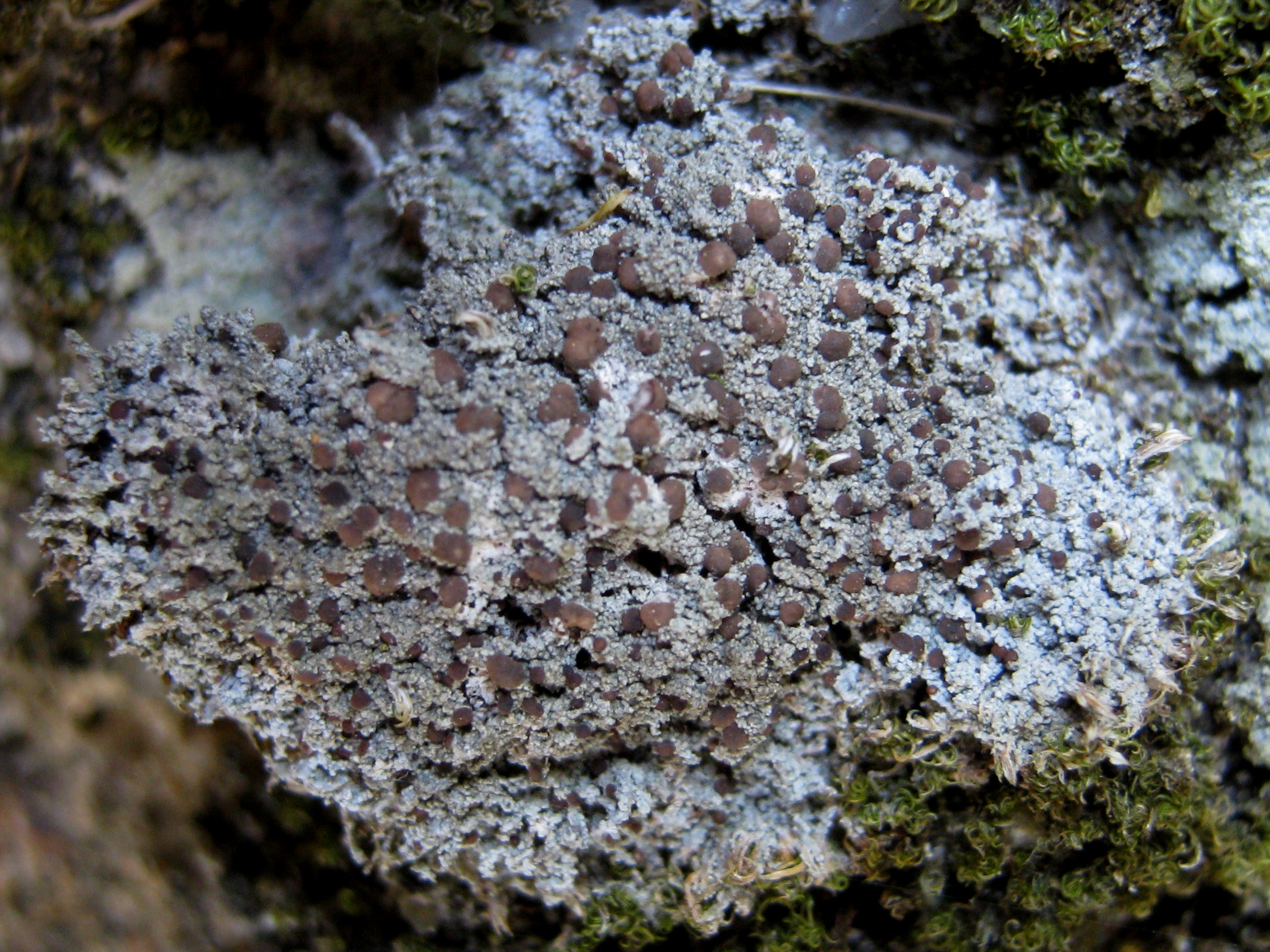
- Bilimbia sabuletorum in Portugal

Scientific classification
- Kingdom: Fungi
- Division: Ascomycota
- Class: Lecanoromycetes
- Order: Lecanorales
- Family: Ramalinaceae
- Genus: Bilimbia; De Not. (1846)

Type species
- Bilimbia hexamera De Not. (1846)

Synonyms
- Mycobilimbia Rehm (1890); Myxobilimbia Hafellner (2001); Probilimbia Vain. (1899); Weitenwebera Opiz (1857)

= Bilimbia =

Genus of lichen-fungi

Bilimbia is a genus of lichen-forming fungi in the family Ramalinaceae. The genus forms crustose (crust-like) lichens that appear as whitish-grey to grey patches on calcium-rich soils or mosses growing over alkaline surfaces. The genus is distinguished by its sessile apothecia (fruiting bodies) that range from light ochre to black, eight-spored asci, and colourless spores with multiple cross-walls. Molecular phylogenetics studies have confirmed that Bilimbia forms a well-supported monophyletic group within the Ramalinaceae, and as of 2025, it contains 24 accepted species.

== Taxonomy ==
Before Bilimbia was circumscribed by Giuseppe De Notaris, the name had been used in botany. Reichenbach had attempted to use it for what is now known as the Bilimbi or Cucumber tree (Averrhoa bilimbi), but this usage was never validly published under botanical nomenclature rules.

The genus Bilimbia as defined by De Notaris in 1846 included two species, B. hexamera and B. tetramera. It became widely adopted among lichenologists, particularly in the British Isles where it was used consistently from William Mudd's 1861 flora through Duncan's 1959 guidebook. However, its use declined in the early 1900s when Alexander Zahlbruckner transferred the Bilimbia species into his broader concept of the genus Bacidia.

Several related genera were proposed during this period of taxonomic uncertainty. Philipp Maximilian Opiz created Weitenwebera in 1857 specifically to replace Bilimbia De Not., though this replacement name itself turned out to be a later homonym. Mycobilimbia Rehm was established in 1889 as a separate genus, notable for having no nomenclatural connections to De Notaris's original Bilimbia species. Another genus name, Probilimbia, was briefly mentioned by Edvard August Vainio in 1899 but is considered superfluous.

The taxonomy was later clarified when research showed that Reichenbach's use of Bilimbia did not constitute valid publication, meaning De Notaris's use remained valid. By 2001, four main European species were recognised: B. accedens, B. lobulata, B. microcarpa, and B. sabuletorum, with the type species B. hexamera now considered a synonym of B. sabuletorum. Molecular phylogenetic evidence suggests that the genus forms a well-supported monophyletic clade within the Ramalinaceae.

De Notaris did not specify a type species when he created the genus. Bruce Fink designated B. hexamera as the type in 1910. However, he used the now-obsolete American Code, and the new nomenclatural rules allow for his typification to be superseded by any later typification, unless the typification has been reaffirmed in the interim. In 1952, Rolf Santesson set B. hexamera as the type. In 1984, Josef Hafellner redesignated B. tetramera as the type, a decision that was followed by Timdal in 1991. However, B. tetramera is now known as Mycobilimbia tetramera. If B. tetramera is assigned as the type of Bilimbia, then Bilimbia becomes a synonym of, and the correct name for Mycobilimbia, which is taxonomically unfeasible. For this reason, a proposal was published in 2020 to conserve the name Bilimbia with B. hexamera as a conserved type. The proposal was accepted by the Nomenclature Committee for Fungi in 2023.

== Description ==
Bilimbia is a genus of crustose (crust-forming) lichens. These organisms form thin, spreading patches that range in colour from whitish grey to grey. Unlike some lichens, they do not produce soredia (powdery reproductive structures) and lack a prothallus (a preliminary growth stage). The main body (thallus) of the lichen contains green algal cells as its photobiont partner. The fungal reproductive structures (ascomata) appear as small, rounded discs (apothecia) that sit directly on the surface. These apothecia are typically convex and lack a distinct rim, though young specimens may have flat tops with a shallow margin. They range in colour from light ochre to dark brown or black, and have an undusted (epruinose) appearance.

When viewed under a microscope, the apothecia show several distinct layers. The outer protective layer (true exciple) curves backward and contains densely packed, radiating fungal threads (hyphae) held together by a firm gel. This layer often contains dark brown or pinkish-brown pigments that intensify when treated with potassium hydroxide solution (K) and turn purple with nitric acid (N). The spore-producing layer (hymenium) is 50–90 micrometres (μm) tall, occasionally reaching 110 μm, and usually lacks a well-defined top layer.

The reproductive cells (asci) each produce eight spores and have a distinctive structure that shows complex staining patterns when treated with iodine and potassium hydroxide solution. The spores themselves are colourless and elongated, with 0 to 7 (rarely up to 9) cross-walls (septa), and often have a rough outer coating. The genus may contain a secondary metabolite, called zeorin, though many species lack any detectable secondary compounds. Various olive-green and brown pigments occur throughout the fungal tissues, though these remain chemically uncharacterised.

== Habitat and distribution ==
Bilimbia species are typically found growing on calcium-rich soils or on mosses that grow over alkaline surfaces. This preference for basic (non-acidic) environments and their association with moss communities is characteristic of the genus.

== Species ==
As of February 2025, Species Fungorum (in the Catalogue of Life) accept 24 species of Bilimbia:

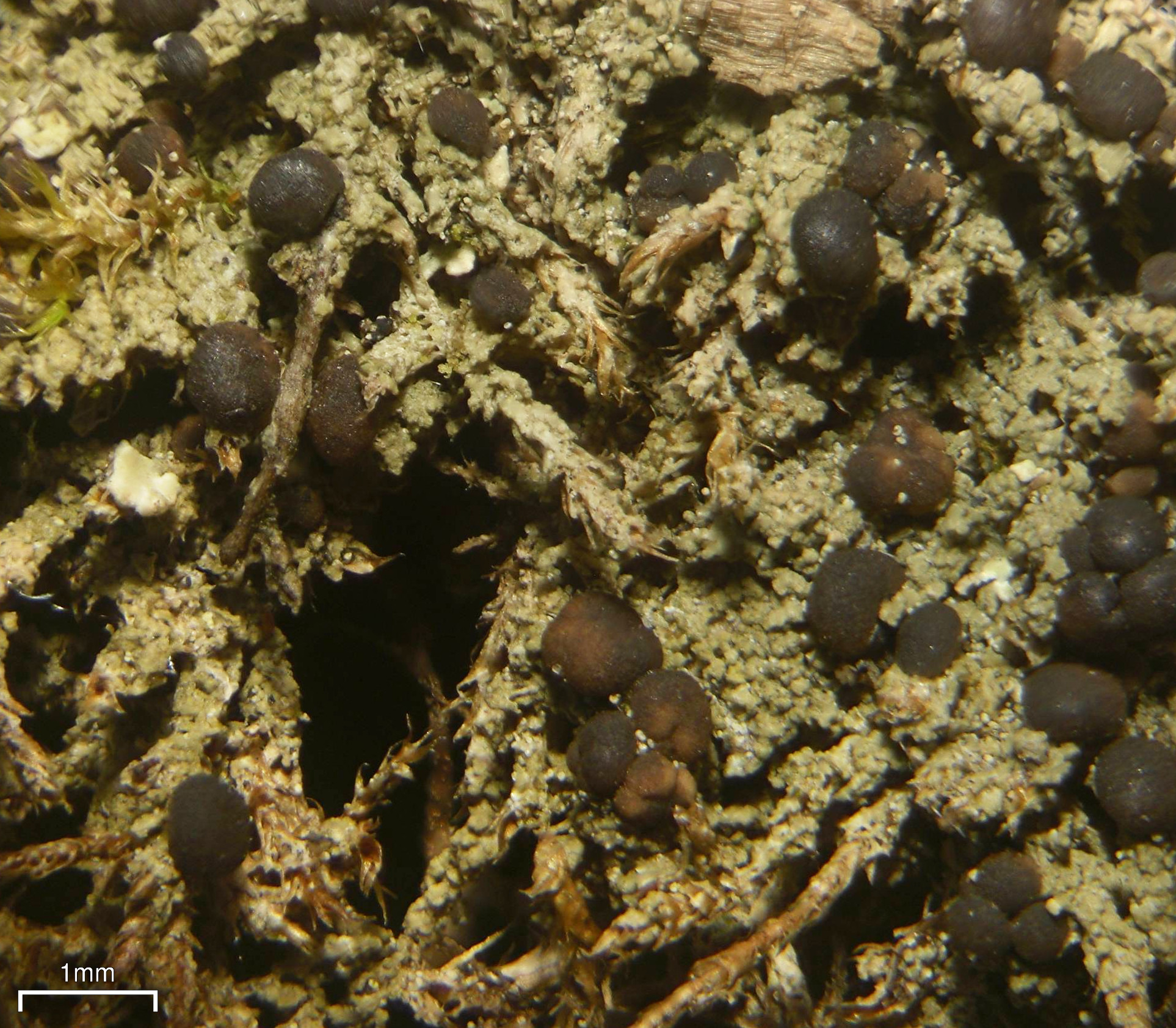
Mycobilimbia tetramera

- Bilimbia caloosensis (Tuck.) Fink (1935)
- Bilimbia caudata (Nyl.) Fink (1935)
- Bilimbia cinereoglauca B.de Lesd. (1935)
- Bilimbia corcovadensis (Malme) Llop (2006)
- Bilimbia declinis (Tuck.) Fink (1935)
- Bilimbia gallica B.de Lesd. (1936)
- Bilimbia granosa (Tuck.) Fink (1935)
- Bilimbia fiumensis (Schul. & Zahlbr.) Szatala (1942)
- Bilimbia jeanjeanii B.de Lesd. (1936)
- Bilimbia lobulata (Sommerf.) Hafellner & Coppins (2004)
- Bilimbia microcarpa (Th.Fr.) Th.Fr. (1863)
- Bilimbia minima (Vain.) Räsänen (1943)
- Bilimbia myriocarpa Erichsen (1939)
- Bilimbia myrtillicola Erichsen (1939)
- Bilimbia novohebridica Räsänen (1949)
- Bilimbia pulchra (Oxner) Oxner (1968)
- Bilimbia ravenelii (Tuck.) Fink (1935)
- Bilimbia rubidofusca (Willey) Fink (1935)
- Bilimbia rubricosa (Müll.Arg.) Fink (1935)
- Bilimbia sabuletorum (Schreb.) Arnold (1869)
- Bilimbia sabulosa A.Massal. (1852)
- Bilimbia salevensis (Müll.Arg.) M.Choisy (1953)
- Bilimbia sibiriensis (Willey) Oxner (1968)
- Bilimbia suballinita (Nyl.) Oxner (1968)
- Bilimbia sublecanorina (Nyl.) Szatala (1956)
- Bilimbia tetramera De Not. (1846)
