= Bacidiopsora =

Scientific classification
- Kingdom: Fungi
- Division: Ascomycota
- Class: Lecanoromycetes
- Order: Lecanorales
- Family: Ramalinaceae
- Genus: Bacidiopsora; Kalb (1988)

Type species
- Bacidiopsora squamulosula (Nyl.) Kalb (1988)

Genus of lichen-forming fungi

Bacidiopsora is a genus of lichen-forming fungi in the family Ramalinaceae.

== Species list ==
- Bacidiopsora microphyllina
- Bacidiopsora orizabana
- Bacidiopsora psorina
- Bacidiopsora silvicola
- Bacidiopsora squamulosula
- Bacidiopsora tenuisecta
