= Ramalina confertula =

Conservation status
- Vulnerable (IUCN 3.1)

Scientific classification
- Kingdom: Fungi
- Division: Ascomycota
- Class: Lecanoromycetes
- Order: Lecanorales
- Family: Ramalinaceae
- Genus: Ramalina
- Species: R. confertula

Binomial name
- Ramalina confertula Krog & Østh.

Species of lichen

Ramalina confertula, the mountain strap lichen, is a species of fruticose lichen in the family Ramalinaceae, known from only four locations on Porto Santo Island (Portugal).

== Habitat and Distribution ==
R. confertula grows on volcanic rock on four volcanic rocky outcrops, at altitudes of 200 to 500 m.
