= Physcidia =

Scientific classification
- Domain: Eukaryota
- Kingdom: Fungi
- Division: Ascomycota
- Class: Lecanoromycetes
- Order: Lecanorales
- Family: Ramalinaceae
- Genus: Physcidia; Tuck. (1862)

Type species
- Physcidia wrightii Tuck. (1862)

Species
- P. australasica P. callopis P. carassensis P. endococcinea P. matogrossensis P. neotropica P. squamulosa P. wrightii

Synonyms
- Megalopsora Vain. (1921)

Genus of lichens

Physcidia is a genus of lichen-forming fungi in the family Ramalinaceae. The genus was circumscribed in 1862 by American lichenologist Edward Tuckerman.

== Species ==
- Physcidia australasica Kalb & Elix (1995)
- Physcidia callopis (Meyen & Flot.) Müll.Arg. (1883)
- Physcidia carassensis Kalb & Elix (1995)
- Physcidia endococcinea Zahlbr. (1909)
- Physcidia matogrossensis Kalb & Elix (1995)
- Physcidia neotropica Kalb & Elix (1995)
- Physcidia squamulosa Tuck. (1862)
- Physcidia striata Aptroot, M.Cáceres & Timdal (2014)
- Physcidia wrightii Tuck. (1862)

The taxon once known as Physcidia cylindrophora (Taylor) Hue (1908) is now Bacidia cylindrophora.
