= Thamnolecania =

Scientific classification
- Domain: Eukaryota
- Kingdom: Fungi
- Division: Ascomycota
- Class: Lecanoromycetes
- Order: Lecanorales
- Family: Ramalinaceae
- Genus: Thamnolecania (Vain.) Gyeln.

Species
- T. antarctica T. brialmontii T. fuegiensis T. gerlachei T. iodoflavescens T. mawsonii T. subvermicularis

Genus of fungi

Thamnolecania is a genus of lichenized fungi in the family Ramalinaceae.
