= Cliomegalaria =

Scientific classification
- Kingdom: Fungi
- Division: Ascomycota
- Class: Lecanoromycetes
- Order: Lecanorales
- Family: Ramalinaceae
- Genus: Cliomegalaria van den Boom & P.Alvarado (2019)
- Species: C. symmictoides

Binomial name
- Cliomegalaria symmictoides van den Boom & P.Alvarado (2019)

Genus of lichens

Cliomegalaria is a fungal genus in the family Ramalinaceae. It comprises the single species Cliomegalaria symmictoides, a corticolous (bark-dwelling), crustose lichen found in the Azores.

== Taxonomy ==
Both the genus and species were described in 2019 by the lichenologists Pieter van den Boom and Pablo Alvarado. The type specimen was collected from Faial Island, on the east side of the island's centre, in the Botanical Garden of Faial. The genus name alludes to its relationship with the genera Cliostomum and Megalaria. The species epithet refers to the resemblance to Lecanora symmicta.

== Description ==
Cliomegalaria symmictoides produces small reproductive structures (apothecia) that measure 0.2–0.6 mm in diameter. These apothecia are slightly rounded on top (convex) and have a pale colouration ranging from cream to light yellow-brown, sometimes featuring distinctive small bluish spots scattered across their surface. The rim or margin around each apothecium is barely noticeable and eventually disappears as the structure matures.

When examined microscopically, the apothecia show several distinctive features. The outer protective layer (excipulum) is made up of elongated cells arranged in a radiating pattern, with individual cells measuring 1.5–2 micrometres (μm) wide, occasionally reaching 2.5 μm. The fungal spores (ascospores) are elliptical in shape and relatively large, measuring 10–15 μm long (sometimes up to 18) and 4.5–6.5 μm wide. Each spore has a thick wall and is divided into two cells by a central wall (septum). The species also produces very small, spherical reproductive cells called conidia, which are translucent (hyaline) and measure just 1–2 μm in diameter.

Chemical analysis shows that the lichen produces stictic acid as its main secondary metabolite, which is used for species identification.
