= Parallopsora =

Scientific classification
- Domain: Eukaryota
- Kingdom: Fungi
- Division: Ascomycota
- Class: Lecanoromycetes
- Order: Lecanorales
- Family: Ramalinaceae
- Genus: Parallopsora; Kistenich, Timdal & Bendiksby (2018)

Type species
- Parallopsora leucophyllina (Nyl.) Kistenich, Timdal & Bendiksby (2018)

Species
- P. brakoae P. labriformis P. leucophyllina

Genus of lichens

Parallopsora is a small genus of lichen-forming fungi in the family Ramalinaceae. Established in 2018, the genus contains three species that were previously classified under a related genus, Phyllopsora. These lichens form small, scale-like growths that overlap like roof tiles and typically appear pale green to bluish-green in colour. They reproduce through both small brown fruiting bodies and sometimes through powdery structures on their surface. The species are known to grow in tropical rainforests, particularly in Brazil, Peru and Cuba.

== Taxonomy ==
The genus was circumscribed in 2018 by Sonja Kistenich, Einar Timdal, and Mika Bendiksby. The genus was created to reclassify species that were previously included in the genus Phyllopsora, based on new phylogenetic evidence. The name Parallopsora combines the prefix "para-" (meaning "beside" or "near") and "-llopsora", alluding to the genus's close relationship to Phyllopsora. The type species for the genus is Parallopsora leucophyllina, which was originally described by William Nylander. In addition to P. leucophyllina, the genus includes Parallopsora brakoae and Parallopsora labriformis, which were previously classified in Phyllopsora but reassigned to Parallopsora based on recent molecular data. These species were originally described from tropical rainforest regions, particularly in Peru and Cuba.

== Description ==
Lichens in the genus Parallopsora have a squamulose thallus—a crust-like body that consists of small, overlapping scale-like structures (squamules). The thallus may either form as an effuse, spreading layer or take on a circular form with radiating lobes at the edges. The squamules, which are up to 2 mm wide, adhere tightly to the substrate when young but soon become elevated and imbricate (overlapping like roof tiles). The upper surface of the thallus is typically pale green to bluish green and can be smooth (glabrous) or finely hairy (tomentose). Some species in this genus may produce powdery reproductive structures called soralia, but these are not always present. The genus lacks a prothallus, which is a fungal mat that some lichens develop around the thallus edges.

The upper cortex (the outermost layer of the thallus) is composed of irregularly arranged, thick-walled fungal filaments called hyphae, but it does not contain crystals or a dead layer of cells known as the epinecral layer. The lichen's symbiotic algae are unicellular and green, and the internal tissue (medulla) may or may not contain lichen-specific chemicals. Unlike some lichens, Parallopsora lacks a lower cortex, meaning the thallus is not protected on its underside.

The apothecia (fruiting bodies) are small, biatorine (without a thalline margin), and typically brown in colour. They can reach up to 1.0 mm in diameter, have a slightly convex shape, and their edges are poorly defined, often disappearing as they mature. Inside the apothecia, the hymenium—the spore-producing layer—contains paraphyses (sterile support filaments) and asci (sac-like structures that contain spores). The paraphyses are straight and unbranched, while the asci are clavate (club-shaped), containing eight simple or faintly septate (divided) ascospores that are slender and rod-shaped (bacilliform to acicular). The genus does not produce any visible conidiomata (asexual spore-producing structures). Some species of Parallopsora produce secondary metabolites such as homosekikaic acid and sekikaic acid, while others do not produce any detectable lichen substances.

== Species ==
- Parallopsora brakoae (Timdal) Kistenich, Timdal & Bendiksby (2018) – Peru
- Parallopsora labriformis (Timdal) Kistenich, Timdal & Bendiksby (2018) – Brazil; Peru
- Parallopsora leucophyllina (Nyl.) Kistenich, Timdal & Bendiksby (2018) – Brazil; Cuba
