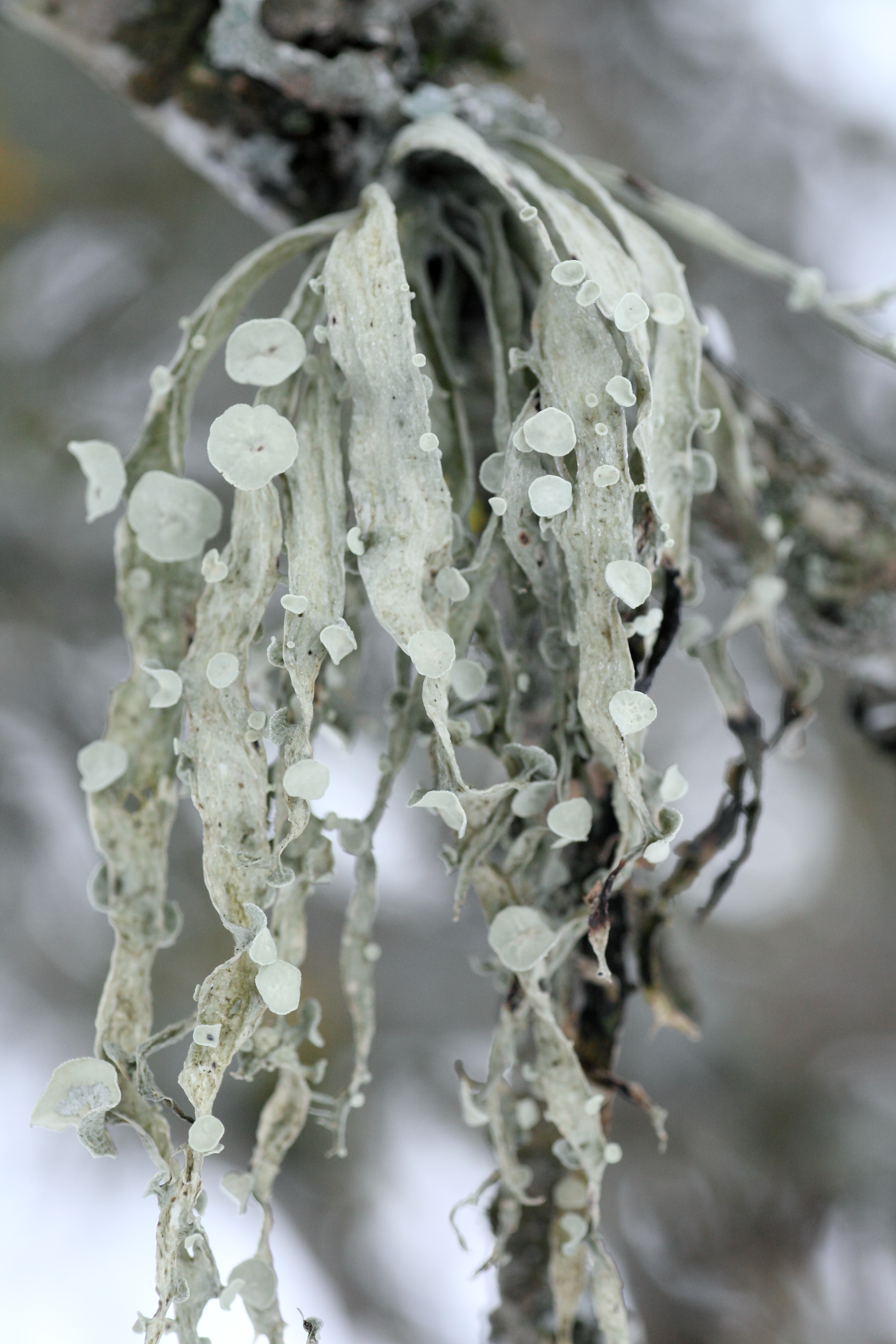
- Ramalina fraxinea—type species of the type genus of the Ramalinaceae

Scientific classification
- Kingdom: Fungi
- Division: Ascomycota
- Class: Lecanoromycetes
- Order: Lecanorales
- Family: Ramalinaceae; C.Agardh (1821)

Type genus
- Ramalina Ach. (1809)

Synonyms
- List: Bacidiaceae Walt.Watson (1929); Biatoraceae A.Massal. ex Stizenb. (1862); Catinariaceae Hale ex Hafellner (1984); Crocyniaceae M.Choisy ex Hafellner (1984); Lecaniaceae Walt.Watson (1929); Megalariaceae Hafellner (1984); Phyllopsoraceae Zahlbr. (1905)

= Ramalinaceae =

Family of fungi

The Ramalinaceae are a family of lichen-forming fungi in the order Lecanorales. First proposed by Carl Adolph Agardh in 1821, the family now comprises 70 genera and more than 1180 species. Ramalinaceae lichens exhibit diverse growth forms, including crustose, fruticose, squamulose, leprose, and byssoid thalli, and form symbiotic relationships primarily with green algae of the genus Trebouxia. The family is characterised by pale-coloured thalli, apothecia (fruiting bodies) that are typically pale but may darken with age, and ascospores that vary in shape and septation.

Members of the Ramalinaceae are found in a wide range of habitats worldwide, from coastal fog deserts to boreal, temperate, and tropical forests. Some genera, such as Namibialina, Vermilacinia, and Niebla, are endemic to specific coastal desert regions, whilst others like Ramalina have an almost worldwide distribution. Several species within the family face conservation challenges due to their limited distributions and specific environmental threats, with some being listed as vulnerable or critically endangered on the IUCN Red List.

== Systematics ==
=== Taxonomy ===
The family was proposed by the Swedish botanist Carl Adolph Agardh in 1821. While Agardh initially classified it as an "ordo" (order), he used it in a way that suggested a family ranking, referring to it as "Ramalineae". According to the nomenclatural authority Index Fungorum, while Agardh initially classified it as an "ordo" (order), he used it in a way that suggested a family ranking, referring to it as "Ramalineae". The first explicit use of Ramalinaceae as a family name came from Antoine Laurent Apollinaire Fée in 1824, but this was not considered valid under Article 32.1(b) of the nomenclature rules, meaning it was not accompanied by a description or diagnosis or a reference to a previously published description or diagnosis. The first correctly spelled use of the family name Ramalinaceae in accordance with Article 18.4 (i.e., with the ending -aceae) is attributed to Watson in a 1929 publication.

Early taxonomists proposed various classification schemes for the family. William Nylander (1870) subdivided it based on internal thallus structures, while Edvard Vainio (1890) emphasized the anatomical structure of the cortex and established sections including Fistularia and Myelopoea. Later, Gustaf Einar Du Rietz (1926) treated the old genera Desmazieria and Euramalina as subgenera under Ramalina, further dividing them into sections and subsections based on thallus anatomy. However, none of these classification schemes gained full acceptance among modern-day taxonomists.

In 2018, Sonja Kistenich and colleagues published a large-scale molecular phylogenetic analysis of the family. The study demonstrated five well‐supported clades in the Ramalinaceae; they are named after the largest genera within them, viz. the Bacidia-, Biatora‐, Ramalina‐, Rolfidium‐, and Toninia‐groups. The genera Bacidia, Phyllopsora, Physcidia and Toninia were found to be polyphyletic and split into segregates. The study also traced the character evolution of the morphological and ecological nature of the Ramalinaceae ancestor. The ancestor probably arose from moist, temperate forests growing on the bark of trees with a crustose growth form and reproduced mainly by forming apothecia and long, multi-septate spores.

A 2020 study by Richard Spjut and colleagues provided further insights into the taxonomy of Ramalinaceae, particularly focusing on the fruticose genera. The research revealed that the fruticose genera within Ramalinaceae are not monophyletic (derived from a single ancestor) but form two distinct lineages: 1) Ramalina + Namibialina and 2) Vermilacinia + Niebla. These lineages are nested within accessions of the crustose genus Cliostomum.

The divergence between these two main lineages occurred approximately 48 million years ago. Ramalina began to spread worldwide around 43 million years ago, whilst its sister genus Namibialina, newly described in this study, radiated later (about 19–20 million years ago) in the coastal deserts of southwest Africa. Vermilacinia and Niebla, which diverged around 30 million years ago, are primarily found in coastal deserts of the New World.

The study highlighted challenges in delimiting species boundaries within Niebla and Vermilacinia, indicating that more data are required for a comprehensive understanding. Notably, the taxonomy proposed by Spjut (1996) for Niebla was not fully corroborated by molecular data, whereas that for saxicolous Vermilacinia received substantial support. The research also led to the description of new Vermilacinia species.

Regarding the genus Ramalina, the study examined 50 identified species out of an estimated total of 230. Species lacking secondary metabolites (except usnic acid) were resolved at the base of the phylogenetic tree but did not form a monophyletic group. Some clades corresponded to the production of specific secondary metabolites, although these were not always autapomorphies. The study also resulted in the recognition or resurrection of several Ramalina species, including R. krogiae and R. lusitanica.

=== Synonymy ===
Some genera now classified in the Ramalinaceae were considered by past authors to be distinctive enough to warrant inclusion in their own family. These historical family names are considered synonymous with Ramalinaceae:

- Bacidiaceae Walt.Watson (1929)
- Biatoraceae A.Massal. ex Stizenb. (1862)
- Catinariaceae Hale ex Hafellner (1984)
- Crocyniaceae M.Choisy ex Hafellner (1984)
- Lecaniaceae Walt.Watson (1929)
- Megalariaceae Hafellner (1984)
- Phyllopsoraceae Zahlbr. (1905)

=== Etymology ===
As is standard practice in botanical nomenclature, the name Ramalinaceae is based on the name of the type genus, Ramalina, with the ending -aceae indicating the rank of family. The genus name, assigned by the mycologist Erik Acharius in 1809, comprises the Latin word ramus meaning 'branch' and ramalis, meaning 'pertaining to a branch or having branches', and -ina, a suffix that denotes similarity. It refers to the typically fruticose, highly branched thalli characteristic of many Ramalina species.

== Description ==
The Ramalinaceae consists of lichen-forming fungi with a highly varied appearance. The thallus, which is the body of the lichen, can take different forms such as crusty (crustose), bushy (fruticose), scale-like (squamulose), or even granular (leprose) or cottony (byssoid). A few species within this family also grow on other lichens (lichenicolous). The colouration of these lichens tends to be pale, and some species may develop small reproductive structures called isidia or soralia that help with vegetative reproduction. The lichen's photobiont partner, which is the photosynthetic organism living within the fungus, is of the chlorococcoid type, meaning it consists of green algae that are spherical or slightly elongated.

Ramalinaceae lichens reproduce [[[sexual reproduction|sexually]] via apothecia (fruiting bodies), which are usually pale and may appear black with age. These apothecia may sit directly on the thallus surface or occasionally have short stalks. The edge of the apothecium (the margin) typically lacks a thallus-like covering, but a structural layer called the exciple is often present, though it may disappear over time as the lichen matures. The disc of the apothecium can range from flat to strongly convex.

Within the apothecia, there are microscopic structures called paraphyses, which are unbranched or branched filaments that surround the spore-producing cells. The tips of these paraphyses are often swollen. The asci (spore-producing cells) are typically cylindrical to club-shaped. These asci belong to either the Bacidia or Biatora types, which are distinguished by specific staining patterns when exposed to iodine (K/I+), showing a dark blue reaction. Each ascus usually contains eight spores. The ascospores, which are the fungal reproductive units, can vary widely in shape, from broadly elliptical to thread-like. They may be divided by one or more walls (septate) or lack divisions entirely (aseptate), and they are colourless without a surrounding layer.

Members of this family may produce asexual reproductive structures known as pycnidia, which are embedded in the lichen tissue or sit on the surface. These structures release conidia (asexual spores), which also come in various shapes, sometimes septate.

== Photobiont ==
Species in the Ramalinaceae form symbiotic relationships with photobionts, primarily green algae from the genus Trebouxia. A 2024 study focusing on the Ramalina farinacea group identified two main photobiont species: Trebouxia jamesii and T. lynnae. These photobionts show distinct geographical distributions and ecological preferences: T. jamesii predominates in continental Europe and Mediterranean islands, favouring inland areas, whereas T. lynnae is more common in Macaronesian archipelagos and coastal regions and is better adapted to warmer, more humid climates. Specificity varies within the family, as Ramalina farinacea can associate with both T. jamesii and T. lynnae, whereas the Canarian endemic R. alisiosae shows a strict association with T. lynnae. This flexibility likely contributes to the ecological adaptability of the group. Both T. jamesii and T. lynnae also partner with lichens from other genera and families beyond Ramalinaceae, underlining their broader ecological role.

A 2022 study on the Ramalina decipiens group found that about 50% of thalli contained multiple algal species, though typically one was dominant, accounting for about 94% of algal cells in mixed thalli. Island of origin and macroclimate exerted greater influence on photobiont community structure than the particular Ramalina species, consistent with local photobiont adaptation. Multiple genetic variants (haplotypes) of T. jamesii occur, some widespread across Europe and others confined to specific regions, a diversity that may enhance the symbiosis' adaptive potential. T. jamesii tended to favour continental areas, whereas T. lynnae preferred coastal regions and islands, patterns that may reflect differences in temperature tolerance and salinity adaptation. The capacity of some Ramalinaceae to switch or adjust photobiont partnerships may facilitate colonisation and persistence across varied habitats. For example, Ramalina maderensis associates with different photobionts in different parts of its range. However, a study of the R. decipiens group found no evidence for trophic niche differentiation among Ramalina species, suggesting that photobiont association is not a primary driver of speciation in that group.

== Habitat and distribution ==
The Ramalinaceae family exhibits a diverse range of habitats and distributions, with several genera showing highly specialised ecological niches. Three fruticose genera—Namibialina, Vermilacinia, and Niebla—are endemic to coastal fog deserts. Namibialina is found in southwestern Africa, whilst Vermilacinia occurs along the Pacific coasts of South and North America. Niebla is restricted to North America. In contrast, Ramalina has a subcosmopolitan distribution, colonising a wide range of habitats from saxicolous sea-shores to trunks and branches in boreal, temperate, and tropical forests. Many species within these genera are found on coastal rocks in fog deserts, while others are epiphytic. Notably, there is evidence of micro-endemism, particularly in Niebla and saxicolous Vermilacinia species, with many taxa having very restricted geographical ranges. The distribution and speciation of these genera have been significantly influenced by fog conditions and climate changes since the Miocene. Some species exhibit disjunct distributions, such as Vermilacinia zebrina, which is found in both North America and Namibia.

== Genera ==
In a comprehensive molecular phylogeny of the family in which 6 existing genera were reduced to synonymy, Kistenich and colleagues accepted 39 genera in the Ramalinaceae. Several genera have since been added, some newly proposed and some resurrected from previously disused names. As of November 2026, Species Fungorum (in the Catalogue of Life), accepts more than 1180 species distributed amongst 70 genera in the Ramalinaceae.

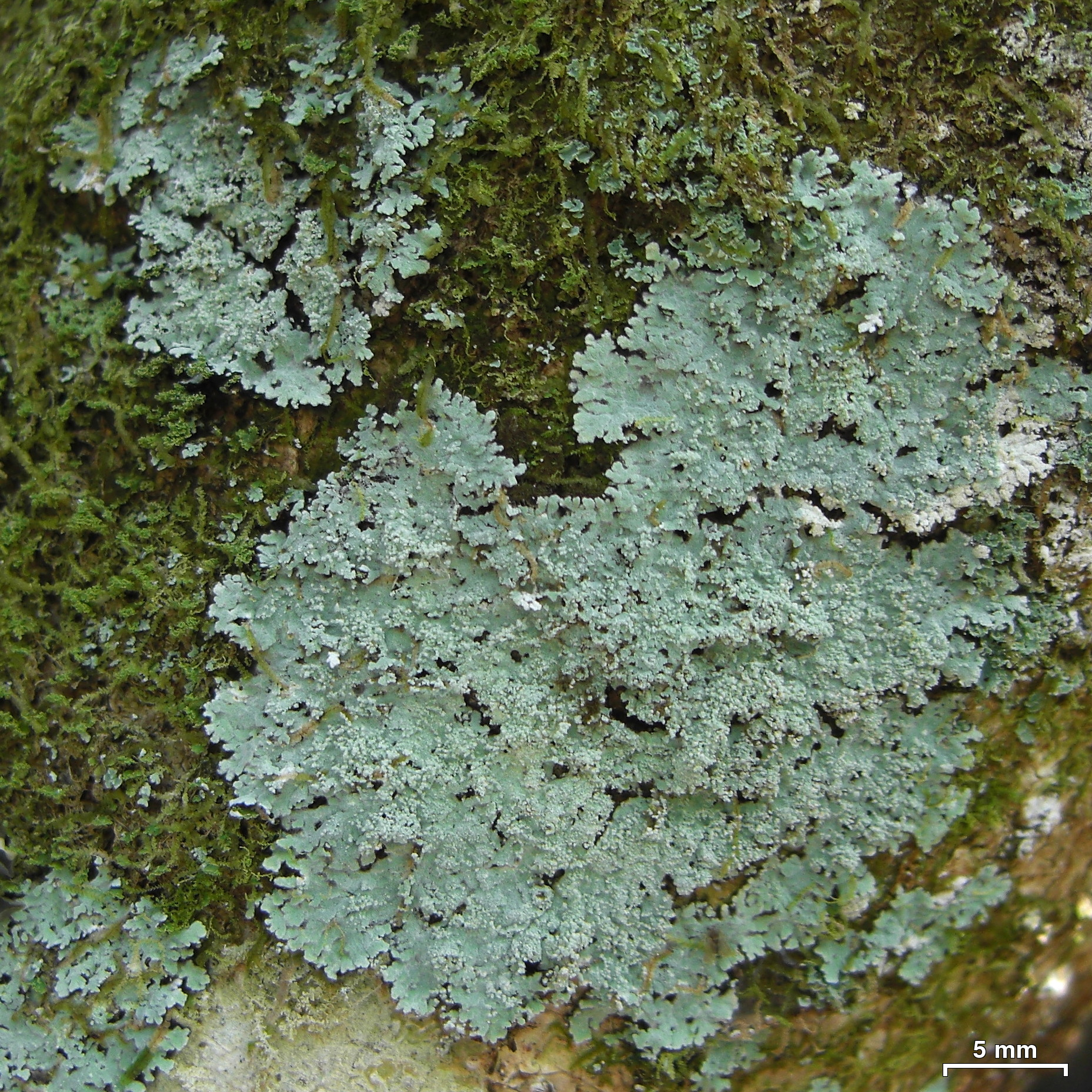
Crocynia pyxinoides

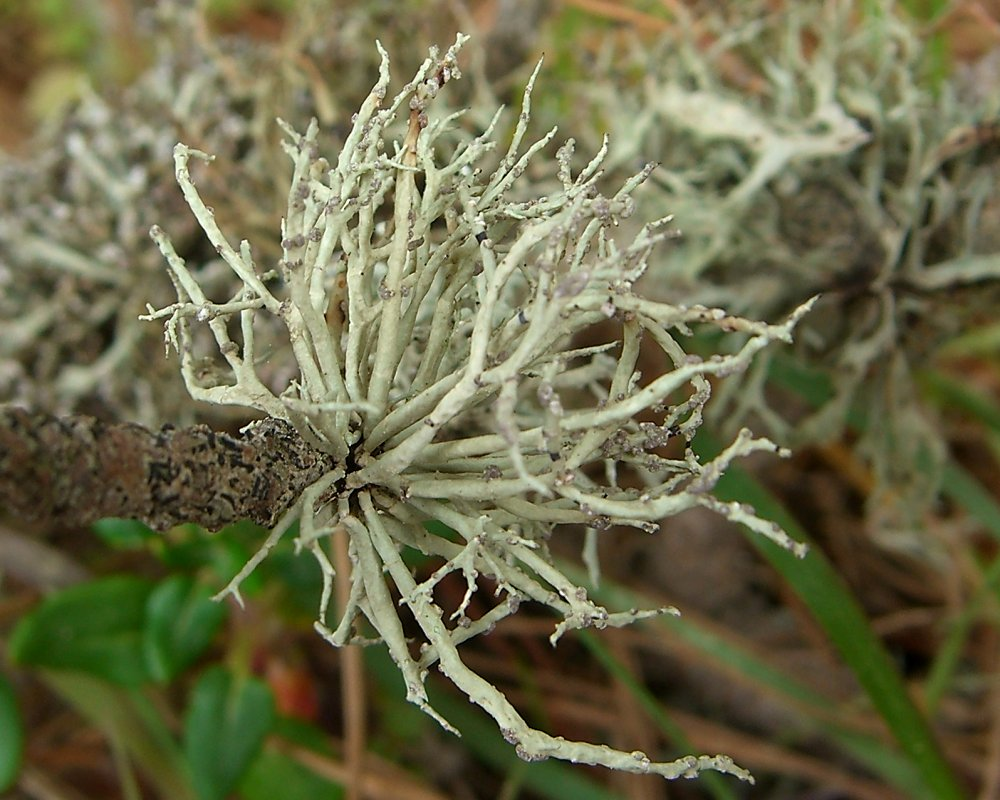
Niebla cephalota

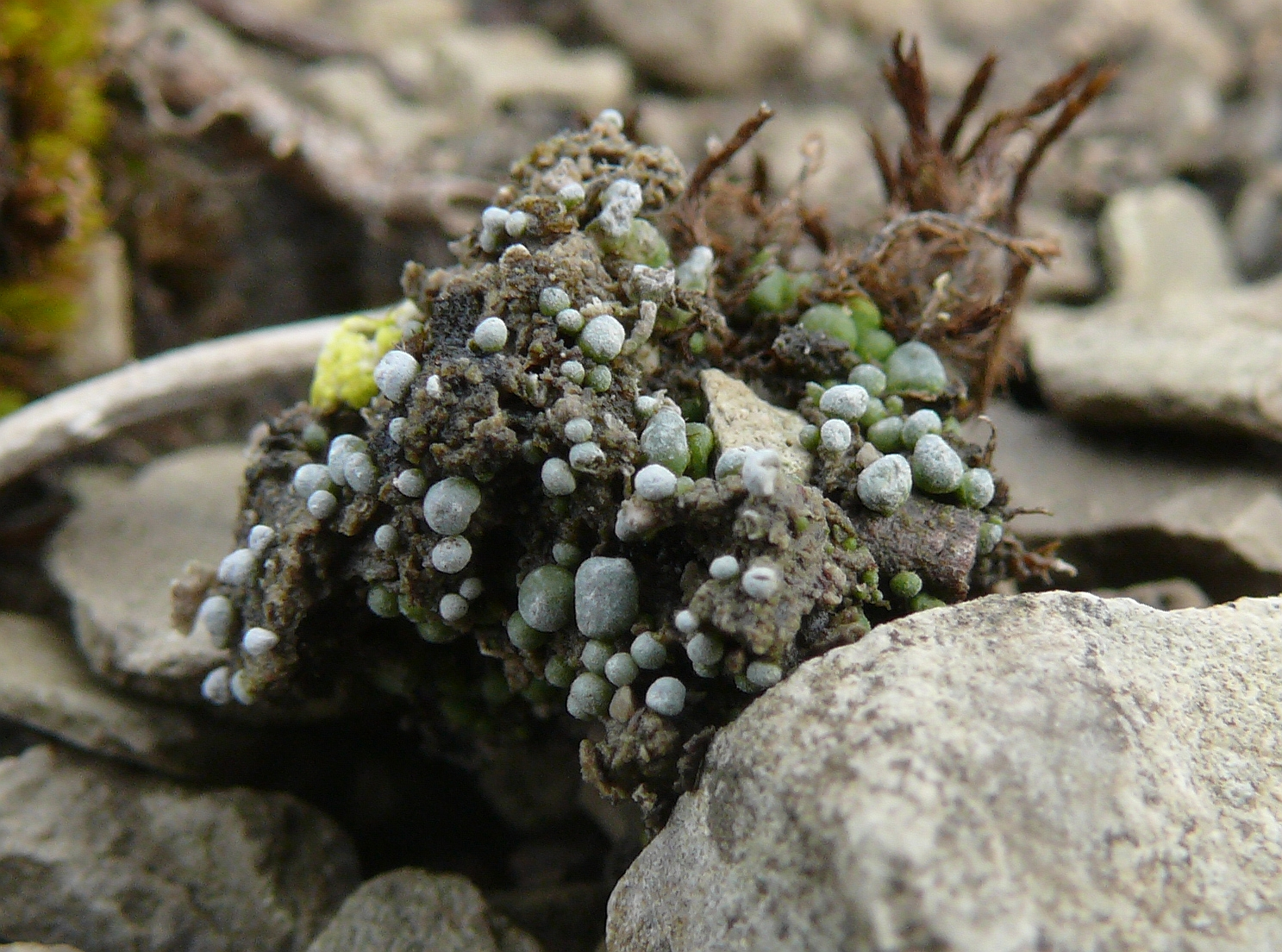
Toninia sedifolia

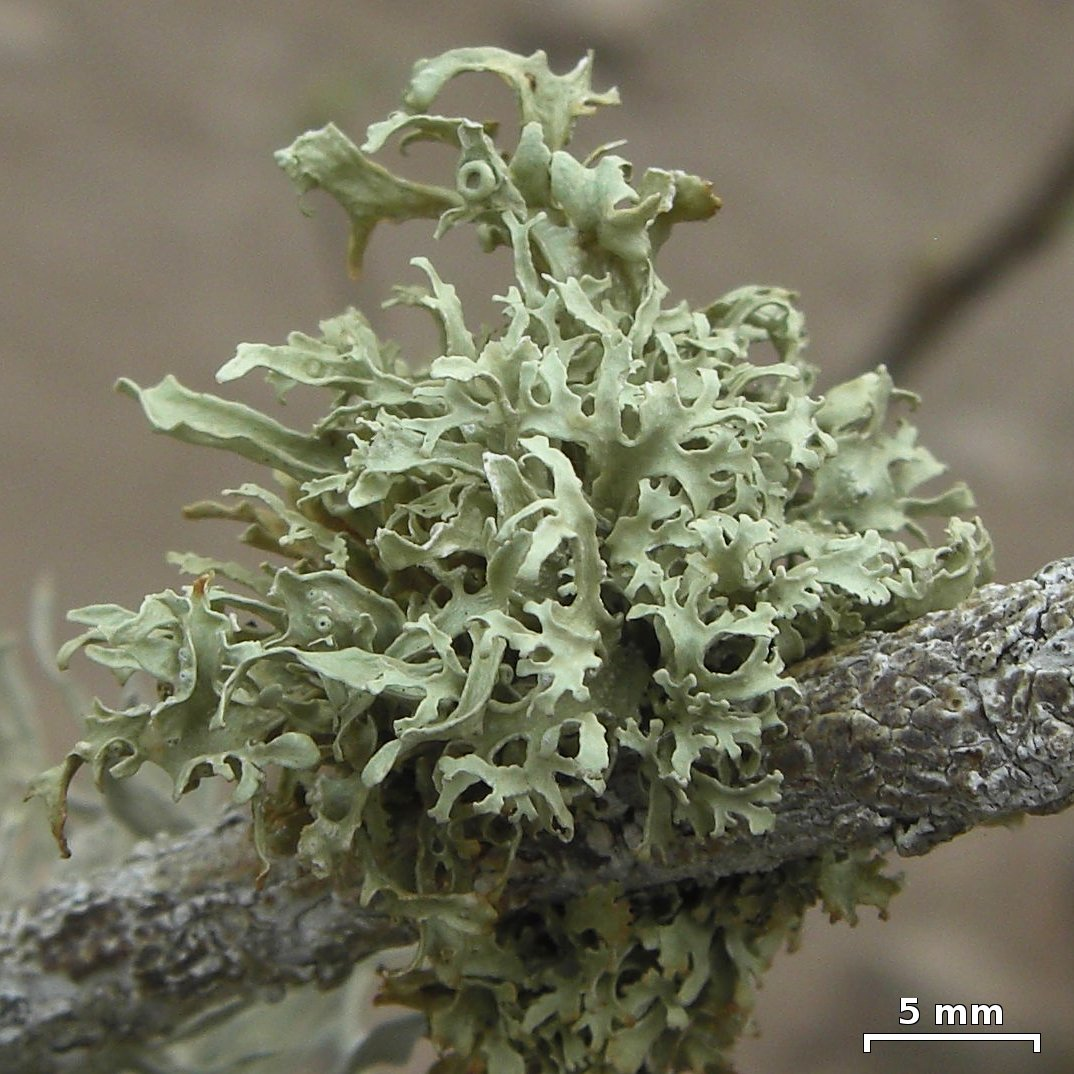
Ramalina darwiniana

- Aciculopsora Aptroot & Trest (2006) – 3 spp.
- Appressodiscus Aptroot & L.A.Santos (2023)
- Auriculora Kalb (1988) – 1 sp.
- Bacidia De Not. (1846) – 230 spp.
- Bacidiopsora Kalb (1988) – 6 spp. (Note: Molecular phylogenetic analysis has indicated that the type species of Bacidiopsora is nested in Bacidia.)
- Bacidina Vězda (1991) – 12 spp.
- Badimia Vězda (1986) – 20 spp.
- Bellicidia Kistenich, Timdal, Bendiksby & Ekman (2018) – 1 sp.
- Biatora Fr. (1819) – 42 spp.
- Bibbya J.H.Willis (1956) – 10 spp.
- Bilimbia De Not. (1846) – 6 spp.
- Catinaria Vain. (1922) – 6 spp.
- Cenozosia A.Massal. (1845) – 1 sp.
- Cliomegalaria van den Boom & Alvarado (2019) – 1 sp.
- Cliostomum Fr. (1825) – 25 spp.
- Compsocladium I.M.Lamb (1956) – 2 spp.
- Coppinsidea S.Y.Kondr., Farkas & Lőkös (2019) – 2 spp.
- Crocynia (Ach.) A.Massal. (1860) – 5 spp. (Note: Crocynia is nested within Phyllopsora; a proposal has been made to conserve the name Phyllopsora against Crocynia.)
- Crustospathula Aptroot (1998) – 5 spp.
- Echidnocymbium Brusse (1987) – 1 spp.
- Eschatogonia Trevis. (1853) – 7 spp.
- Heppsora D.D.Awasthi & K.Singh (1977) – 1 sp.
- Herteliana P.James (1980) – 4 spp. (Note: Herteliana is included in the Cladoniaceae by some recent authors.)
- Ivanpisutia S.Y.Kondr., Lőkös & Hur (2015) (resurrected) – 2 spp.
- Jarmania Kantvilas (1996) – 2 spp.
- Kiliasia Hafellner (1984) – 9 spp.
- Krogia Timdal (2002) – 7 spp.
- Lecania A.Massal. (1853) – 50 spp.
- Lecaniella Jatta (1889) (resurrected) – 2 spp.
- Lithocalla Orange (2020) – 2 spp.
- Lopezaria Kalb & Hafellner (1990) – 2 spp. (Note: Kistenich and colleagues (2018) suggest that Lopezaria is a synonym of Megalaria.)
- Lueckingia Aptroot & Umaña (2006) – 1 sp.
- Megalaria Hafellner (1984) – 46 spp.
- Mycobilimbia Rehm (1980) – 5 spp.
- Myelorrhiza Verdon & Elix (1986) – 2 spp.
- Myrionora R.C.Harris (1988) (resurrected) – 5 spp.
- Namibialina Spjut & Sérus. (2020) – 1 sp.
- Niebla Rundel & Bowler (1978) – 23 spp.
- Parallopsora Kistenich, Timdal & Bendiksby (2018) – 3 spp.
- Phyllopsora Müll.Arg. (1894) – 75 spp.
- Physcidia Tuck. (1862) – 10 spp.
- Pseudohepatica P.M.Jørg. (1993) – 2 spp.
- Pseudolepraria Kukwa, Jabłońska, Kosecka & Guzow-Krzem. (2023) – 1 sp.
- Ramalina Ach. (1809) – 230 spp.
- Ramalinopsis (Zahlbr.) Follmann & Huneck (1969) – 1 sp. (Note: Kistenich and colleagues (2018) suggest that Ramalinopsis can be reduced into synonymy with Ramalina.)
- Rolfidium Moberg (1986) – 3 spp.
- Schadonia Körb. (1859) – 4 spp. (Note: The placement of Schadonia within Ramalinaceae is uncertain, with recent studies suggesting it may belong in Ectolechiaceae or warrant its own family, Schadoniaceae, pending further phylogenetic research.)
- Scutula Tul. (1852) – 43 spp.
- Stirtoniella D.J.Galloway, Hafellner & Elix (2005) – 1 sp.
- Tamasia Farkas (2023) – 1 sp.
- Tasmidella Kantvilas, Hafellner & Elix (1999) – 1 sp.
- Thalloidima A.Massal. (1852) – 17 spp.
- Thamnolecania (Vain.) Gyeln. (1933) – 1 sp.
- Tibellia Vězda & Hafellner (1992) – 1 sp.
- Toninia A.Massal. (1852) – 85 spp.
- Toniniopsis Frey (1926) – 7 spp.
- Tylocliostomum van den Boom & Magain (2020) – 1 sp.
- Vandenboomia S.Y.Kondr. (2019) – 2 spp.
- Vermilacinia Spjut & Hale (1995) (Note: Index Fungorum places Vermilacinia into synonymy with Ramalina.)
- Waynea Moberg (1990) – 7 spp.
- Woessia D.Hawksw. & Poelt (1986) – 8 spp.
- Wolseleyidea S.Y.Kondr., Farkas & Lőkös (2019) – 6 spp.

== Conservation ==
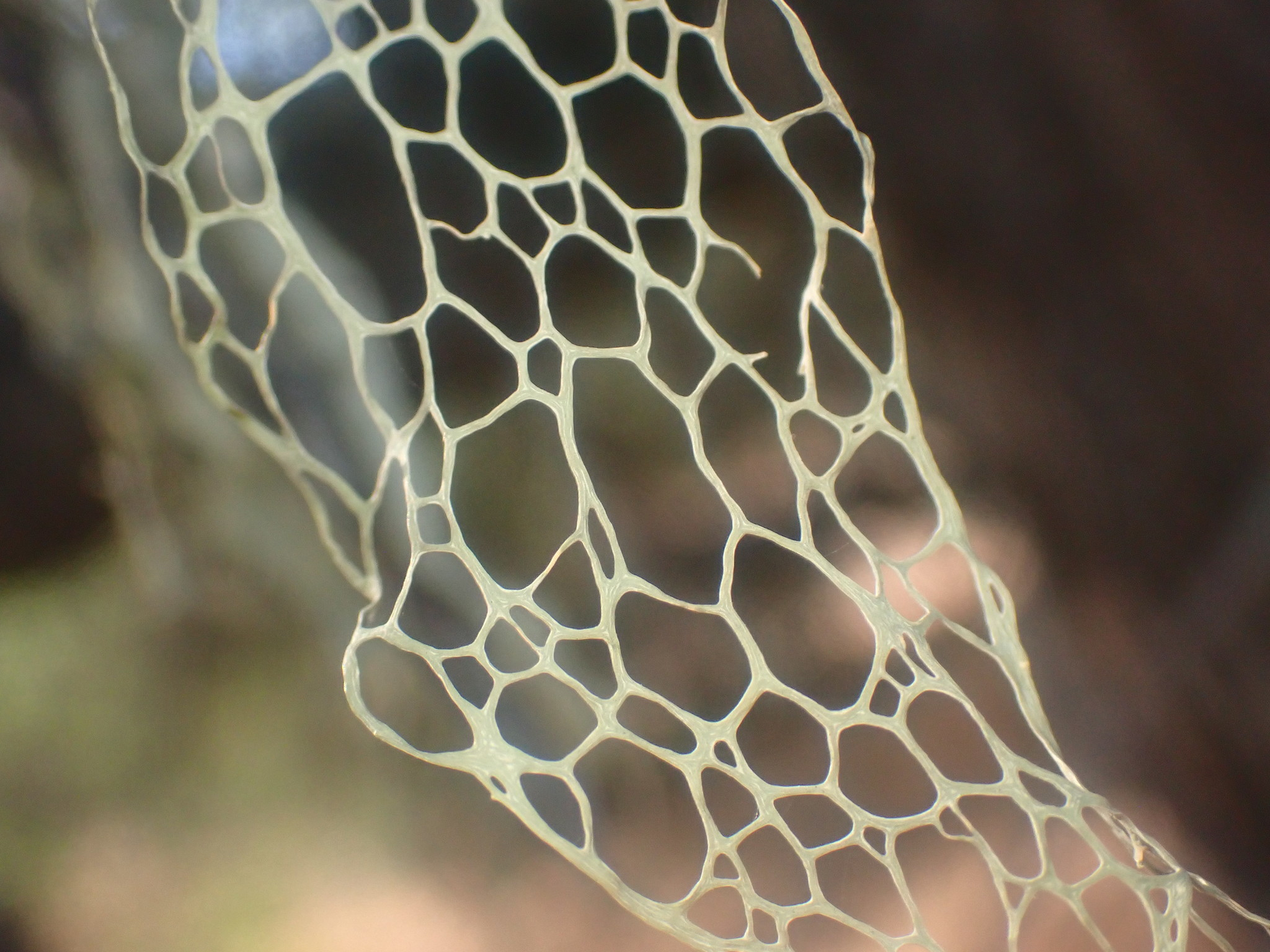
Ramalina menziesii, the state lichen of California, is assessed as Least Concern by the IUCN.

The conservation status of 12 Ramalinaceae species has been assessed for the global IUCN Red List. Several species in the family are facing conservation challenges due to their limited distributions and specific environmental threats.

=== Madeira archipelago endemics ===
In the Madeira archipelago, particularly on Porto Santo Island, multiple rock-dwelling Ramalina species are assessed as Vulnerable. R. portosantana, R. erosa, R. timdaliana, R. confertula, and R. jamesii each have restricted populations, ranging from 500 to 1,000 individuals across one to four locations. These species are primarily threatened by trampling and wildfires, which could swiftly devastate their entire populations. Additionally, R. nematodes, although more abundant with twelve locations, is considered Near Threatened due to its very restricted area of occupancy and the potential impacts of the same threats.

=== Galapagos endemics ===
In the Galapagos Islands, Ramalina fragilis is the rarest among the four endemic Ramalina species. Unlike its congeners that thrive on shrubs and trees, R. fragilis is adapted to rocky substrates. It faces unique threats such as flash floods during El Niño events, erosion, and rising sea levels, which are expected to reduce its population size, area of occupancy, and habitat quality by up to 40% over the next 45 years.

=== California endemics ===
Niebla ramosissima, found solely on San Nicolas Island in Mediterranean California, is also listed as Vulnerable. Its limited distribution, confined to a single location with an area of occupancy up to 32 km^{2}, makes it susceptible to habitat transformation caused by invasive species and climate change, which could alter its natural sea-side low-shrub vegetation.

=== Other species ===
Lecania vermispora is known from three locations with a total area of occupancy of 8 km². This species faces threats from livestock grazing and climatic changes, which could lead to its decline and potential extirpation. Consequently, it is listed as Vulnerable under criterion D2.

Bacidia proposita is categorised as Critically Endangered. It is known from only one locality within the municipality of Honda, with an area of occupancy of 4 km². This site has experienced significant habitat loss due to logging and the expansion of urban, industrial, and agricultural frontiers. Despite recent surveys in similar habitats, the species has not been rediscovered.

Conversely, Bacidia schweinitzii and Ramalina menziesii are assessed as Least Concern. Bacidia schweinitzii is widespread across eastern North America with scattered occurrences in eastern Asia, while Ramalina menziesii is common and locally abundant along the coastal regions of western North America. Neither species currently faces significant threats that would jeopardise their populations.
