= Biatora epirotica =

Scientific classification
- Domain: Eukaryota
- Kingdom: Fungi
- Division: Ascomycota
- Class: Lecanoromycetes
- Order: Lecanorales
- Family: Ramalinaceae
- Genus: Biatora
- Species: B. epirotica

Binomial name
- Biatora epirotica Printzen & T.Sprib. (2011)

Species of lichen

Biatora epirotica is a species of corticolous (bark-dwelling) lichen in the family Ramalinaceae. Found in specific regions of the Balkans and Turkey, it was described as new to science in 2011 by lichenologists Christian Printzen and Toby Spribille.

== Taxonomy ==
Biatora epirotica was first described by lichenologists Christian Printzen and Toby Spribille in 2011. The species epithet is derived from Epirus, the geographical region in the Balkans where most of the samples were collected. The type specimen was found by the second author in Epirus, Greece, on twigs of Abies borisii-regis.

== Description ==
The thallus of Biatora epirotica lacks a cortex, is smooth to rimose, and ranges in colour from beige to gray, often with a greenish tinge. The surface is matt, lacks soredia, and can grow up to 10 mm (0.4 in) in diameter. The lichen's photobiont is trebouxioid.

Apothecia of Biatora epirotica are sessile, with a diameter of 0.3–0.6 mm, and a white to pale ochre disc. The lichen has 8-spored asci and (0–)3-septate ascospores, which are hyaline and narrowly ellipsoid, sometimes slightly bent.

Biatora epirotica closely resembles B. pallens but can be distinguished by its larger ascospores and a deeper hymenium. B. pallens has narrower ascospores and contains usnic acid, which is not present in B. epirotica.

== Habitat and distribution ==
Biatora epirotica has been found on twigs of various tree species, such as Abies borisii-regis, A. nordmanniana, Laurus nobilis, Ostrya carpinifolia, and Quercus coccifera, as well as on trunks and dead twigs of young Picea orientalis. The lichen primarily occurs in mountainous areas with high humidity and extensive cyanolichen communities at elevations between 450 and 1,500 m (1,480 and 4,920 ft).

The known distribution of Biatora epirotica is centred around the Black Sea region, well-known for being a refugium of the Tertiary and Pleistocene periods. Other Biatora species with similar distributional ranges include B. bacidioides, B. pontica, and B. longispora. The latter two species are also known from eastern North America and East Asia, suggesting that Biatora epirotica might also be found in these regions.
