= Biatora aureolepra =

Scientific classification
- Domain: Eukaryota
- Kingdom: Fungi
- Division: Ascomycota
- Class: Lecanoromycetes
- Order: Lecanorales
- Family: Ramalinaceae
- Genus: Biatora
- Species: B. aureolepra

Binomial name
- Biatora aureolepra T.Sprib. & Tønsberg (2009)

Species of lichen

Biatora aureolepra is a species of lichen in the family Ramalinaceae, first found in inland rainforests of British Columbia. This lichen forms thin, powdery crusts that are bright yellow-green when fresh but fade to golden tones over time, and it has never been observed producing fruiting bodies. It grows on the bark and decaying wood of conifers in very humid, old-growth forests and has a scattered distribution in northwestern North America, central Norway, and Austria.

== Taxonomy ==
The species was described in 2009 by Toby Spribille and Tor Tønsberg during a survey of inland rainforest lichens; the holotype, collected from soft conifer wood beside the Roaring River arm of Quesnel Lake, British Columbia (716 m a.s.l.), is lodged in the Canadian Museum of Nature herbarium, with duplicates in Bergen and other collections. Its name combines the Latin aureolus (“golden-yellow”) with lepra ('scurf' or 'leprosy'), a nod to the species' golden hue in dried material and its powdery habit.

Because B. aureolepra has never been seen with apothecia, its placement in Biatora is provisional. Morphological and chemical traits—especially the leprose crust and the C+ (rose) reaction—suggest affinity with Biatora chrysantha and B. chrysanthoides, yet the new species lacks the small corticate areoles typical of those taxa and it contains far more 5-O-methylhiascic acid. That depside is known as a major compound in only two leprose crusts worldwide (B. aureolepra and Micarea coppinsii), allowing the new species to be distinguished readily from superficially similar yellow-green crusts of Lecanora expallens, Cliostomum spp., or Lepraria spp., which possess other chemistries and usually inhabit drier bark.

== Description ==
Biatora aureolepra forms a thin, leprose crust that is bright yellow-green when fresh but often fades to straw-coloured or golden tones in older herbarium specimens. The thallus lacks any layered (stratified) structure; instead, the fungal filaments grow partly within the outer bark or sapwood (endosubstratal), while a single surface layer of powdery soredia builds a patchy film several centimetres across. Individual soredia are usually 18–21 μm in diameter (occasionally as small as 13 μm or as large as 30 μm) and frequently clump into consoredia up to 70 μm wide; viewed under polarised light these granules glitter with minute crystals. A slender, whitish prothallus may outline young colonies. The green-algal partner (a chlorococcoid photobiont) consists of jelly-sheathed cells 6.5–14 μm wide that tend to cluster together.

No sexual fruit-bodies (apothecia) or asexual pycnidia have yet been observed, so the species is known only from its vegetative crust. Chemical tests reveal 5-O-methylhiascic acid as the dominant secondary metabolite, accompanied by traces of gyrophoric and lecanoric acids; a quick rose-violet flash on the thallus with bleach (C+) is characteristic, while reactions with potassium hydroxide solution (K) and para-phenylenediamine (Pd) are negative.

== Habitat and distribution ==
In North America the lichen is confined to interior wet-belt forests of British Columbia and neighbouring Montana, where it colonises bark or decaying wood of western redcedar (Thuja plicata) and western hemlock (Tsuga heterophylla) within humid, old-growth stands that are mostly more than three centuries old. Sites range from about 525 to 930 m (1,722 to 3,051 ft) elevation and share a microclimate of persistent ground-level moisture beneath closed canopies.

Across the North Atlantic, records from central Norway and, further south, a recent collection from the Hallstatt area of the Austrian Alps place B. aureolepra on bark and dead wood of Norway spruce (Picea abies) in cool, rain-drenched spruce forests of late-successional age. The Austrian specimen, gathered along the Waldbach river at about 540 m (1,770 ft) altitude in a shaded gorge that receives more than 1,800 mm (71 in) of annual precipitation, formed a straw-coloured, sterile thallus up to 9 cm across.

These scattered localities—north-western North America, boreal Norway and the Central European Alps—reveal a markedly disjunct, moisture-dependent distribution that echoes patterns seen in several other inland-rainforest lichens. Given its minute, sterile habit and the limited number of targeted surveys, the species is probably under-recorded; nevertheless, its reliance on long-undisturbed, humid conifer stands means that continued logging and stand conversion in such forests could threaten its continuity.
