= Biatora ligni-mollis =

Scientific classification
- Kingdom: Fungi
- Division: Ascomycota
- Class: Lecanoromycetes
- Order: Lecanorales
- Family: Ramalinaceae
- Genus: Biatora
- Species: B. ligni-mollis

Binomial name
- Biatora ligni-mollis T.Sprib. & Printzen (2009)

Species of lichen

Biatora ligni-mollis is a species of lichen in the family Ramalinaceae, first found in inland rainforests of British Columbia. This lichen grows exclusively on the soft, decaying wood of dead cedar and hemlock trees, forming thin white to pale cream crusts with abundant reddish-brown fruiting bodies. It gets its name from its preference for "soft wood" and glows brilliant white under ultraviolet light due to a lichen product called lobaric acid. Although first discovered in North American inland rainforests, it has since been discovered in several Western European countries including Belgium, France, Germany, and Scotland.

== Taxonomy ==
The species was described in 2009 by Toby Spribille and Christian Printzen during inland rainforest surveys of British Columbia. The holotype specimen, collected from a soft standing snag on the west bank of the Incomappleux River, Selkirk Mountains (700 m elevation), is housed in the Canadian Museum of Nature herbarium, with isotypes (duplicates) in Bergen and Frankfurt collections. The epithet combines Latin lignum ('wood') and mollis ("soft"), reflecting the species' strict preference for punky, decaying timber.

Subsequent phylogenetics work resolved B. ligni-mollis as the sister species of Biatora veteranorum (the new combination for Catillaria alba) within a well-supported Biatora clade. The two differ at just a single position in the mtSSU locus, confirming their close relationship and the placement of B. ligni-mollis in the Ramalinaceae.

== Description ==
Biatora ligni-mollis develops a thin, crust-forming thallus that is mostly immersed in, or barely lifts above, the surface of decaying conifer wood. Where the thallus is visible it appears white to pale cream and breaks into tiny cracked or granular areoles, together covering patches up to about 13 × 2.5 cm. Each surface granule is corticate, with the cortex only 10–25 μm thick, and encloses a layer of short-celled fungal filaments that weave around the green, rounded photobiont cells (3.5–13 μm across). The crust produces no soredia or isidia, and no hypothallus is evident. Under long-wave ultraviolet light the thallus glows brilliant white—a reaction caused by lobaric acid, a compound rarely recorded in Biatora—while standard spot-tests are otherwise negative.

Reproductive structures are conspicuous. Reddish-brown apothecia may reach densities of 170 per square centimetre, each 0.3–0.9 mm across with a usually undulating, persistent margin and a flat to strongly convex disc. The gelatinised proper exciple—35–75 μm thick—contains masses of colourless crystals that dissolve in potassium hydroxide solution. Within a 105–215 μm-tall hymenium, Micarea-type asci hold eight narrowly ellipsoid ascospores that are 7–11 × 1.8–2.8 μm and remain simple or at most one-septate at maturity. Flask-shaped pycnidia, 0.07–0.12 mm wide, are abundant and generate colourless, ellipsoid to rod-shaped conidia measuring about 4.2 × 1.0 μm.

European material matches the Canadian type in most respects but shows some minor differences: apothecia are usually darker orange-brown and never as crowded, the ascospores are commonly one- to three-septate, and chemical analyses detect both lobaric and roccellic acids (North-American thalli contain lobaric acid alone).

== Habitat and distribution ==
All verified North-American records derive from the humid inland temperate rainforests of south-eastern and central British Columbia. In that region the lichen colonises the soft, punky wood of long-dead western redcedar (Thuja plicata) and western hemlock (Tsuga heterophylla) snags within ancient cedar–hemlock stands that have retained closed canopies for many centuries, typically between about 650 and 820 m elevation.

Subsequent work showed that B. ligni-mollis is also rare but widespread in Western Europe, with confirmed collections from Belgium, France, Germany, Poland and Scotland. There it inhabits the bark or exposed lignum of veteran deciduous and conifer hosts—most frequently oaks, yews, firs and spruces—within long-continuity woodlands or along their margins rather than being restricted to undisturbed inland rainforest sites.

This trans-Atlantic distribution mirrors the disjunct ranges documented for several other lichen species and is most plausibly explained by long-distance dispersal rather than recent anthropogenic introduction.
