= Biatora pacifica =

Scientific classification
- Domain: Eukaryota
- Kingdom: Fungi
- Division: Ascomycota
- Class: Lecanoromycetes
- Order: Lecanorales
- Family: Ramalinaceae
- Genus: Biatora
- Species: B. pacifica

Binomial name
- Biatora pacifica Printzen, Tønsberg & G.Thor (2016)

Species of lichen

Biatora pacifica is a species of corticolous (bark-dwelling), crustose lichen in the family Ramalinaceae. It is found in Russia, Japan, and South Korea, where it grows along the Pacific coast. It inhabits the bark of a variety of coniferous and deciduous plants.

== Taxonomy ==
The species was formally described as new to science in 2016 by lichenologists Christian Printzen, Tor Tønsberg, and Göran Thor. The type specimen was collected on Moneron Island (Nevelsky District, Sakhalin) at an elevation between 150 and 200 m (490 and 660 ft); there, the lichen was found growing on bark at the base of an old Abies sachalinensis tree. The species epithet pacifica refers to its distribution along the Pacific Coast.

== Description ==
The whitish to greenish-grey thallus surface of Biatora pacifica is thick, rough, and crumbling, (tartareous) with warts, and in rare instances forms areoles that are 0.1–0.25 mm in diameter. It lacks a visible hypothallus, as well as the vegetative propagules isidia and soredia. The photobiont partner of the lichen is chlorococcoid (i.e., green algae with a coccoid or spherical shape), with individual algal cells measuring 5–13 μm in diameter. Apothecia are typically abundant and occur singly on the thallus. They are usually about 0.42–0.80 mm in diameter (with an observed maximum of 1.6 mm). The disc is dark grey or olive brown, flat to slightly convex, and roughly the same level as the apothecial margin. Asci contains eight spores and are of the Biatora-type. The ascospores are usually colourless and most lack a septum (rarely, some spores have a single septum), with typical dimensions of 9.6–12.1 by 3.0 –3.5 μm.

Thin-layer chromatography revealed the presence of an unidentified xanthone compounds in Biatora pacifica Also, an unidentified olive-green pigment is present in the apothecial tissue.

The authors notes a resemblance to Ivanpisutia oxneri, but that species has smaller ascospores and a different chemistry. They proposed that Biatora pacifica is an esorediate (i.e., lacking soredia) counterpart of Biatora pontica, although this suggestion awaits corroboration with DNA evidence.

== Habitat and distribution ==
Biatora pacifica grows on the bark of trees, including Abies koreana, A. sachalinensis, Acer mono, Acer palmatum, Quercus crispula, Q. dentata as well as species of Alnus, Magnolia, and Salix. It is distributed along the Pacific coasts of Russia, Japan, and South Korea. In the latter country, it was found at elevations from 700 to 1,600 m (2,300 to 5,200 ft), while in the other locales it has been found at elevations between sea level and 600 m (2,000 ft).
