= Biatora toensbergii =

Scientific classification
- Domain: Eukaryota
- Kingdom: Fungi
- Division: Ascomycota
- Class: Lecanoromycetes
- Order: Lecanorales
- Family: Ramalinaceae
- Genus: Biatora
- Species: B. toensbergii

Binomial name
- Biatora toensbergii Holien & Printzen (1995)

Species of lichen

Biatora toensbergii is a species of corticolous (bark-dwelling), crustose lichen in the family Ramalinaceae. It is found in Norway and northwestern North America.

== Taxonomy ==
The lichen was formally described as a new species in 1995 by the lichenologists Håkon Holien and Christian Printzen. The type specimen was collected by the Norwegian lichenologist Tor Tønsberg in 1981, north of Bjørktjørnane (Nord-Trøndelag, Norway) at an elevation of 210–220 m (690–720 ft); it was found growing on Alnus incana in a south-facing ravine. The species epithet honours the collector, Tønsberg.

Molecular phylogenetics analysis suggests that Biatora pycnidiata is a closely related species, and that these two species form a clade that has a sister group relationship with a clade containing Biatora efflorescens and Biatora helvola.

== Description ==
The thallus of Biatora toensbergii is effuse, meaning it spreads outwards and can reach up to 4.5 cm (1.8 in) in diameter. It has a cracked, areolate appearance, resembling a network of small cracks, with the individual areoles (crust-like sections) measuring between 0.2 and 0.6 mm across. These areoles are generally flat or have an irregularly wrinkled surface. The coloration of the thallus ranges from white to light or medium gray, and it can occasionally have a greenish or brownish tint. The surface is typically matte.

In a cross-section, the thallus has a height of 70–130 μm, though it can occasionally reach up to 300 μm. Notably, Biatora toensbergii lacks a medulla, which is the inner layer found in many lichens. The algal layer, which houses the symbiotic algae (specifically of the trebouxioid type), is 60–100 μm high, but can sometimes extend to 270 μm. The cortical layer, the outermost layer, is colorless and often includes bark fragments, measuring 5–35 μm in thickness.

The reproductive structures, known as apothecia, are rounded or irregularly shaped and can appear either singly or in groups. They are sessile, meaning they sit directly on the substrate without a stalk, and have a constricted base. The average diameter of the apothecia is 0.40–0.65 mm, but they can reach up to 1.15 mm if tuberculate (having small, wart-like projections). The disc of the apothecia is typically orange to red-brown, rarely light ochre, and is weakly to moderately convex, lacking a powdery coating (epruinose). The margin of the apothecia is lighter in color than the disc and becomes less prominent over time.

Internally, the exciple (the outer tissue layer surrounding the apothecium) is colorless to yellowish or orange-brown, especially near the hymenium (the fertile, spore-bearing tissue). The exciple is composed of radiating, weakly branched and anastomosing (interconnecting) hyphae. The hypothecium, located below the hymenium, is 35–150 μm high and is colorless to pale orange-brown, often with a pinkish hue. The subhymenium, directly beneath the hymenium, is 30–65 μm high and slightly darker than the hypothecium. The hymenium itself is 45–60 μm high and colorless.

The paraphyses, which are sterile filaments among the asci (spore-producing cells), are simple or weakly branched. The asci of Biatora toensbergii are of the Biatora type, containing 8 spores and measuring 30–44 μm by 8–11 μm. The ascospores are colourless, simple (occasionally with one to three septa), and measure 10.0–16.4 μm by 3.5–4.7 μm, with a perispore (outer spore wall) about 0.5 μm thick.

Chemical spot tests on the thallus reveal it is negative for C and K, but positive for P (paraphenylenediamine), which turns orange-red. Thin-layer chromatography identifies the presence of argopsin and traces of norargopsin in its chemical composition. Pycnidia, which are asexual reproductive structures, have not been observed in North American specimens.

== Habitat and distribution ==
Biatora toensbergii is found growing on various host trees, including subalpine fir (Abies lasiocarpa), other fir species (Abies spp.), several species of alder (Alnus spp.) such as red alder (A. rubra) and Sitka alder (A. sinuata), as well as on poplar (Populus sp.) and blueberry (Vaccinium sp.). It grows at elevations ranging from sea level up to approximately 1,500 m (4,900 ft).

This lichen species inhabits coniferous forests, particularly those dominated by fir (Abies) or hemlock (Tsuga) trees, as well as in stands of red alder (Alnus rubra). Biatora toensbergii is part of the "Trøndelag phytogeographical element", a term coined by Holien and Tønsberg to describe species that are primarily or exclusively found in the humid coastal forests of central Norway. In its native regions of Norway and western North America, Biatora toensbergii commonly grows on gray alder (Alnus incana) in Norway and red alder (A. rubra) in western North America.
