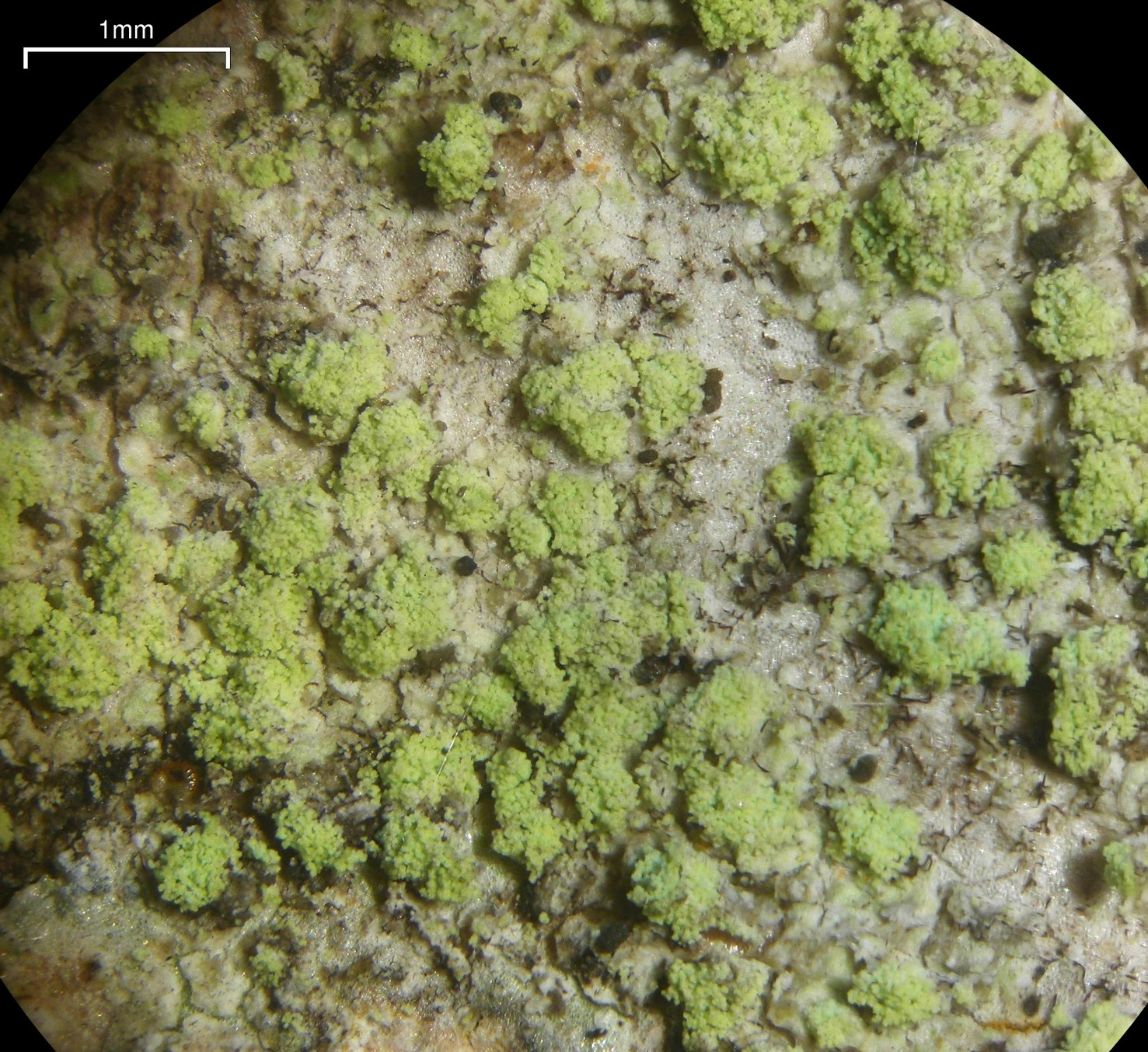
- Soralia of Biatora printzenii, magnified 30X

Scientific classification
- Kingdom: Fungi
- Division: Ascomycota
- Class: Lecanoromycetes
- Order: Lecanorales
- Family: Ramalinaceae
- Genus: Biatora; Fr. (1817)

Type species
- Biatora vernalis (L.) Fr. (1822)

Synonyms
- Ivanpisutia S.Y.Kondr., Lőkös & Hur (2015)

= Biatora =

Genus of lichens

Biatora is a genus of lichens in the family Ramalinaceae. Originally circumscribed in 1817, the genus consists of crustose and squamulose lichens with green algal photobionts, biatorine apothecia, colorless, simple to 3-septate ascospores, and bacilliform pycnospores.

== Description ==
Biatora species are crustose lichens with a spreading (effuse) thallus that may appear thin and somewhat membranous in places. The surface is often cracked (rimose) and, in species that grow in association with mosses, may be granular or warted. The thallus is typically creamy white, dull green, glaucous green, or green-grey and lacks a distinct outer protective layer (cortex). Some species produce soredia, small reproductive granules that facilitate dispersal. A prothallus, the initial fungal layer that some lichens form before developing a full thallus, is absent. The photosynthetic partner (photobiont) is a chlorococcoid alga, a group characterized by spherical to broadly ellipsoidal cells.

The reproductive structures (apothecia) are biatorine, meaning they lack a thalline margin derived from the lichen thallus itself. They are sessile or closely appressed to the surface and range from weakly to strongly convex. In some species, the apothecia are initially flat with a shallow margin but later become immarginate (without a distinct border). Their colour varies widely, including light beige, dark reddish brown, green-grey, bluish green, or khaki. Black apothecia are rare but, when present, have a green or blue tint when wet. Most species lack pruina, the powdery surface coating found on some lichens.

A well-developed true exciple (the outer tissue of the apothecium) is present but becomes reflexed over time. It consists of tightly packed, radiating hyphae embedded in a gel matrix that remains stable in potassium hydroxide (K) solution and does not swell. The outer edge may be coated with a thin gel layer. The hymenium, where spores develop, is 30–100 μm tall and typically lacks a distinct epithecium (uppermost layer), though some species show pale pigmentation at the top. It does not contain granules or oil droplets and reacts with iodine (I+), staining red-brown when young and blue in older herbarium specimens. Below the hymenium, the subhymenium is distinct and slightly opaque due to the presence of ascogenous hyphae (spore-producing structures). The hypothecium, a supporting tissue beneath the hymenium, consists of interwoven hyphae embedded in a dense gel matrix.

The paraphyses, sterile filamentous structures within the hymenium, are coherent in KOH, have narrow lumina (0.5–2.5 μm wide), and are mostly unbranched, though occasional branching or connections (anastomoses) occur. The tips of the paraphyses are slightly swollen, sometimes reaching up to 5 μm in diameter, and rarely bear a distinct cap or hood. The asci, where spores develop, contain eight spores and have a Biatora-type structure. They feature a blue-staining (K/I+) apical dome penetrated from below by a non-staining (K/I–) apical cushion, which is surrounded by a deeply blue-staining zone. The ascus walls themselves do not stain in K/I but are surrounded by an outer layer that reacts red-brown in iodine (I+) and blue in K/I. The ocular chamber, an internal structure within the ascus, is relatively small.

The ascospores are colourless, with a shape ranging from ellipsoidal to filiform (thread-like) or fusiform (spindle-shaped). They may be aseptate (lacking internal divisions) or have between one and seven septa. The spores are smooth and do not possess a distinct outer coating (perispore). Asexual reproduction occurs via conidia, which are produced in small, flask-shaped reproductive structures called pycnidia. These structures are immersed within the thallus and have an unpigmented or weakly pigmented wall, similar in colour to the hymenium. The conidia themselves are colourless, aseptate, and bacillar (rod-shaped).

Chemically, Biatora lichens can contain a variety of secondary metabolites, including gyrophoric acid and argopsin, and less commonly, other depsides, depsidones, xanthones, or usnic acid. Some species, however, lack detectable secondary metabolites when analysed using thin-layer chromatography.

== Species ==
- Biatora alaskana Printzen & Tønsberg (2000)
- Biatora alnetorum S.Ekman & Tønsberg (2019)
- Biatora amylacea Palice, Malíček, Vondrák & Printzen (2023) – Europe
- Biatora appalachensis Printzen & Tønsberg (2004)
- Biatora aureolepra T.Sprib. & Tønsberg (2009)
- Biatora australis Rodr.Flakus & Printzen (2016)
- Biatora bacidioides Printzen & Tønsberg (2003)
- Biatora britannica Printzen, Lumbsch & Orange (2001)
- Biatora carneoalbida (Müll. Arg.) Coppins (1992)
- Biatora chrysantha (Zahlbr.) Printzen (1994)

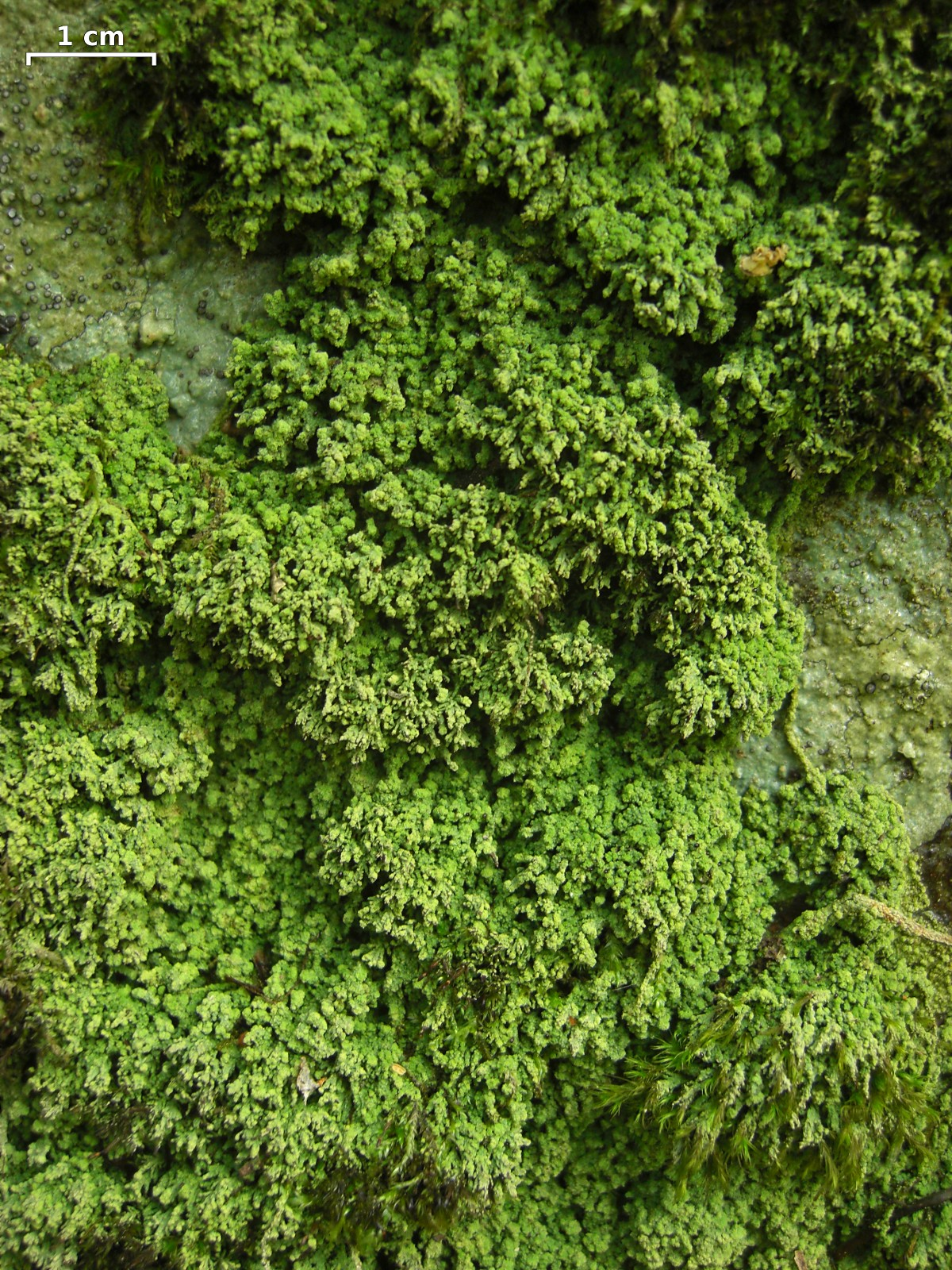
Biatora chrysantha

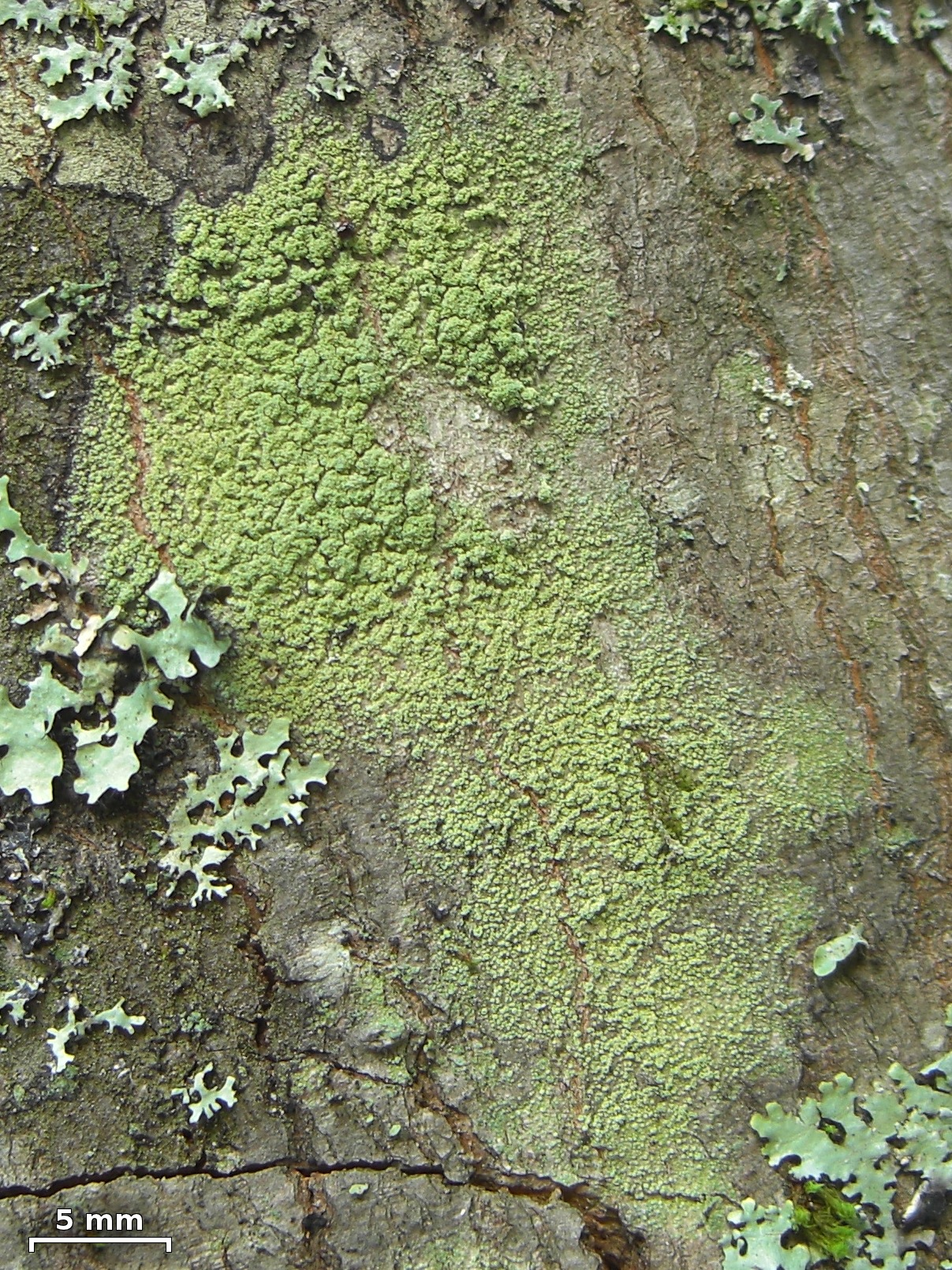
Biatora pontica

- Biatora chrysanthoides Printzen & Tønsberg (2003)
- Biatora cuprea (Sommerf.) Fr. (1831)
- Biatora cuyabensis (Malme) S.Y.Kondr. (2019)
- Biatora efflorescens (Hedl.) Räsänen (1935)
- Biatora ementiens (Nyl.) Printzen (2014)
- Biatora epirotica Printzen & T.Sprib. (2011)
- Biatora epixanthoides (Nyl.) Diederich (1989)
- Biatora globulosa (Flörke) Fr. (1845)
- Biatora hafellneri Rodr.Flakus & Printzen (2016)
- Biatora halei (Tuck.) S.Y.Kondr. (2019)
- Biatora hemipolia (Nyl.) S.Ekman & Printzen (2014)
- Biatora ivanpisutii S.Y.Kondr., Lőkös & Hur (2016)
- Biatora kalbii (Brako) S.Y.Kondr. (2019)
- Biatora kodiakensis Printzen & Tønsberg (2004)
- Biatora ligni-mollis T.Sprib. & Printzen (2009)
- Biatora loekoesiana S.Y.Kondr. & Hur (2018)
- Biatora longispora (Degel.) Lendemer & Printzen (2019)
- Biatora meiocarpa (Nyl.) Arnold (1887)
- Biatora nobilis Printzen & Tønsberg (2000)
- Biatora oligocarpa Printzen & Tønsberg (2004)
- Biatora oxneri (S.Y.Kondr., L.Lőkös & Hur) Printzen & Kistenich (2018)
- Biatora pacifica Printzen, Tønsberg & G.Thor (2016)
- Biatora pallens (Kullh.) Printzen (2005)
- Biatora pausiaca Printzen & Tønsberg (2003)
- Biatora pontica Printzen & Tønsberg (2003)
- Biatora printzenii Tønsberg (2002)
- Biatora pseudosambuci (S.Y.Kondr., Lőkös & Hur) S.Y.Kondr., Lőkös & Hur (2016)
- Biatora pycnidiata Printzen & Tønsberg (2004)
- Biatora radicicola Printzen, Palice & J.P.Halda (2016)
- Biatora subduplex (Nyl.) Printzen (1995)
- Biatora subhispidula (Nyl.) S.Y.Kondr. (2019)
- Biatora terrae-novae Printzen & J.W.McCarthy (2016)
- Biatora toensbergii Holien & Printzen (1995)
- Biatora vernalis (L.) Fr. (1882)
- Biatora veteranorum Coppins & Sérus. (2010)
- Biatora vezdana S.Y.Kondr. (2019)

The taxon Biatora marmorea, found in Alaska, was proposed as a new species in 2020; however, it is an illegitimate name as it had already been used for a species that is now known as Bagliettoa marmorea.
