= Biatora bacidioides =

Scientific classification
- Domain: Eukaryota
- Kingdom: Fungi
- Division: Ascomycota
- Class: Lecanoromycetes
- Order: Lecanorales
- Family: Ramalinaceae
- Genus: Biatora
- Species: B. bacidioides

Binomial name
- Biatora bacidioides Printzen & Tønsberg (2003)

Species of lichen

Biatora bacidioides is a species of corticolous (bark-dwelling), leprose lichen in the family Ramalinaceae. It was formally described as a new species in 2003 by the lichenologists Christian Printzen and Tor Tønsberg, from specimens collected from Picea orientalis forests of north-eastern Turkey. It was recorded from Ukraine in 2018.

Biatora bacidioides is identified by its greyish apothecia (fruiting bodies), which look similar to those of Biatora beckhausii. It has specific spores that are long and narrow (16–47 by 2–4 μm), and it contains a grey pigment in certain tissue layers. The lichen features light yellowish-green, dot-like growths that occasionally merge. These growths contain secondary metabolites, including argopsin and gyrophoric acid, which react Pd+ (orange/red) and C+ (red).
