= List of sources of the National Christmas Tree (United States) =

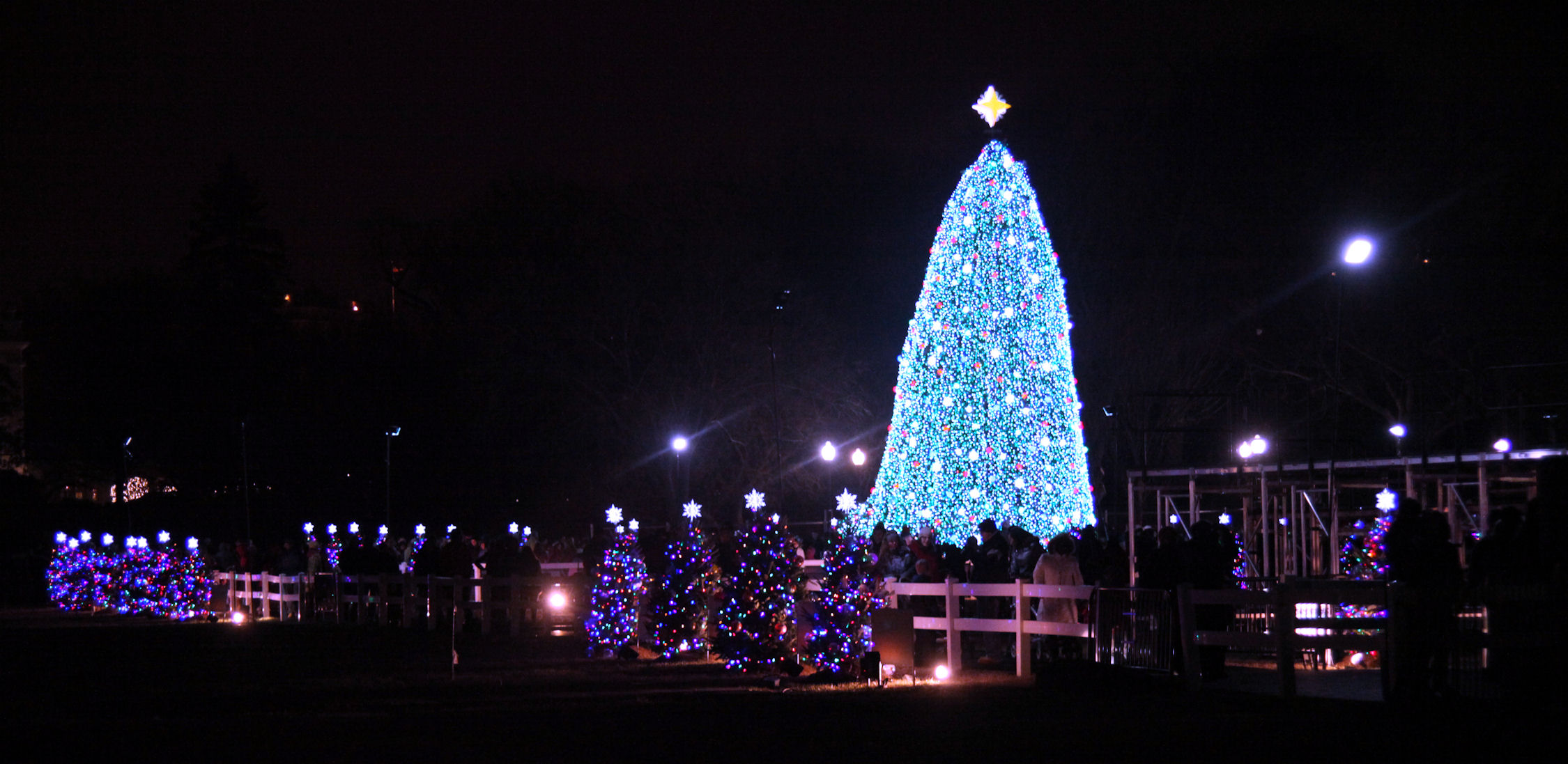
The 2010 National Christmas Tree, located on the north end of the Ellipse, just south of the White House.

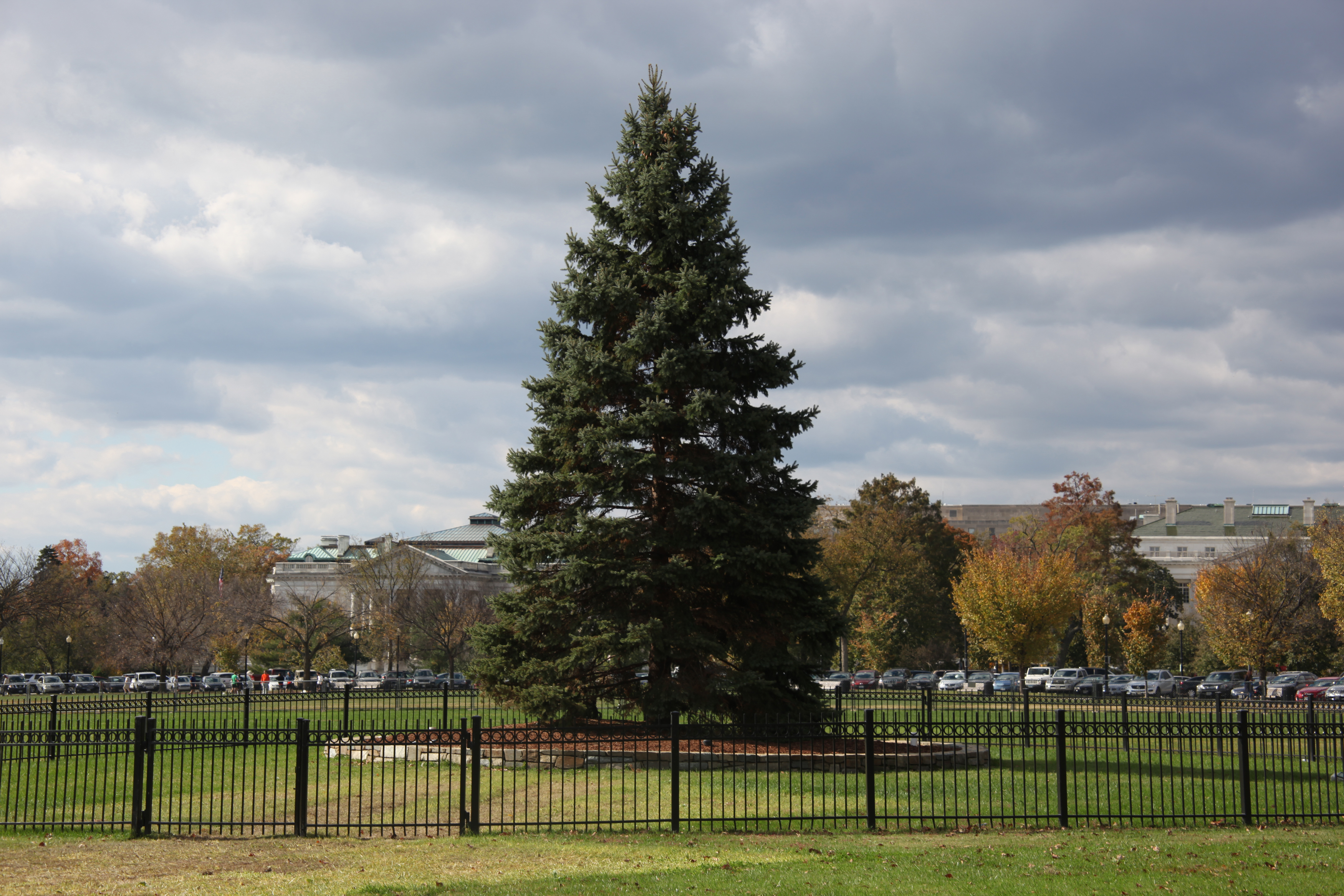
The 2012 National Christmas Tree on November 2, 2012, six days after it was planted.

Sources of the National Christmas Tree in the United States have varied over time. The first National Christmas Tree was erected and lit by President Calvin Coolidge in 1923. As of 2011, the tradition has continued uninterrupted. The trees have come from a wide variety of sources, were placed or planted in different places on the grounds of the President's Park or the White House, have varied in height, and have sometimes been a cut tree and sometimes a living planted tree.

Cut evergreen trees were used in 1923 and from 1954 to 1972. Living trees were used from 1924 to 1953, and again from 1973 to the present (2011). In the list below, the height of the cut tree is the height of the tree when raised at the White House. The height of the living tree is the height when it was first planted. Several states and territories of the United States have provided these trees.

The trees have been placed in a wide variety of locations. These include The Ellipse (the portion of President's Park just south of the White House, across E Street NW), Sherman Plaza (the patio, garden, and public square just south of the Treasury Building and its adjacent Alexander Hamilton Place), Lafayette Park (the square north of the White House, across Pennsylvania Avenue NW), and the South Lawn of the White House.

== Types, sources, heights, and locations of the National Christmas Trees ==
| Year | Cut or living | Type of tree | Source | Height | Location | References |
|---|---|---|---|---|---|---|
| 1923 | Cut | Balsam fir | Vermont | 48 feet (15 m) | Middle of the Ellipse | |
| 1924–1928 | Living | Norway spruce | New York | 35 feet (11 m) | West side of Sherman Plaza | |
| 1929–1930 | Living | Norway spruce | New York | 35 feet (11 m) | West side of Sherman Plaza | |
| 1931–1933 | Living | Blue spruce | Washington, D.C. | 25 feet (7.6 m) | West side of Sherman Plaza | |
| 1934-1938 | Living | Fraser fir (two trees) | North Carolina | 23 feet (7.0 m) | Middle of Lafayette Square | |
| 1939 | Living (transplanted after use) | Red cedar | Virginia | 36 feet (11 m) | North side of the Ellipse | |
| 1940 | Living (transplanted after use) | Red cedar | Virginia | 34 feet (10 m) | North side of the Ellipse | |
| 1941–1953 | Living | Oriental spruce (two trees) | Washington, D.C. | 35 feet (11 m) | South side of the White House South Lawn | |
| 1954 | Cut | Balsam fir | Michigan | 67 feet (20 m) | North side of the Ellipse | |
| 1955 | Cut | White spruce | South Dakota | 67 feet (20 m) | North side of the Ellipse | |
| 1956 | Cut | Engelmann spruce | New Mexico | 67 feet 3 inches (20.50 m) | North side of the Ellipse | |
| 1957 | Cut | White spruce | Minnesota | 60 feet (18 m) | North side of the Ellipse | |
| 1958 | Cut | Engelmann spruce | Montana | 75 feet (23 m) | North side of the Ellipse | |
| 1959 | Cut | White spruce | Maine | 72 feet (22 m) | North side of the Ellipse | |
| 1960 | Cut | Douglas fir | Oregon | 75 feet (23 m) | North side of the Ellipse | |
| 1961 | Cut | Douglas fir | Washington | 75 feet (23 m) | North side of the Ellipse | |
| 1962 | Cut | Blue spruce | Colorado | 72 feet (22 m) | North side of the Ellipse | |
| 1963 | Cut | Red spruce | West Virginia | 71 feet (22 m) | North side of the Ellipse | |
| 1964 | Cut | White spruce | New York | 72 feet (22 m) | North side of the Ellipse | |
| 1965 | Cut | Blue spruce | Arizona | 85 feet (26 m) | North side of the Ellipse | |
| 1966 | Cut | Red fir | California | 65 feet (20 m) | North side of the Ellipse | |
| 1967 | Cut | Balsam fir | Vermont | 70 feet (21 m) | North side of the Ellipse | |
| 1968 | Cut | Engelmann spruce | Utah | 74 feet (23 m) | North side of the Ellipse | |
| 1969 | Cut | Norway spruce | New York | 65 feet (20 m) | North side of the Ellipse | |
| 1970 | Cut | White spruce | South Dakota | 78 feet (24 m) | North side of the Ellipse | |
| 1971 | Cut | Douglas fir | North Carolina | 65 feet (20 m) | North side of the Ellipse | |
| 1972 | Cut | Engelmann spruce | Wyoming | 70 feet (21 m) | North side of the Ellipse | |
| 1973–1976 | Living | Blue spruce | Colorado | 42 feet (13 m) | North side of the Ellipse | |
| 1977 | Living | Blue spruce | Maryland | 34 feet (10 m) | North side of the Ellipse | |
| 1978–2010 | Living | Blue spruce | New York | 30 feet (9.1 m) | North side of the Ellipse | |
| 2011–2012 | Living | Blue spruce | New Jersey | 26.5 feet (8.1 m) | North side of the Ellipse | |
| 2012–2018 | Living | Blue spruce | Virginia | 28 feet (8.5 m) | North side of the Ellipse | |
| 2019–2020 | Living | Blue spruce | Pennsylvania | 30 feet (9.1 m) | North side of the Ellipse | |
| 2021–2022 | Living | White fir | Pennsylvania | 27 feet (8.2 m) | North side of the Ellipse | |
| 2023 | Cut | Norway spruce | West Virginia | 40 feet (12 m) | North side of the Ellipse | |
| 2024 | Cut | Red spruce | Virginia | 35 feet (11 m) | North side of the Ellipse | |
| 2025 | Cut | Red spruce | Virginia | 32 feet (9.8 m) | North side of the Ellipse | |
| 2026 | Cut | Red spruce | Virginia | 36 feet (11 m) | North side of the Ellipse | |

== Bibliography ==
- Crump, William D. The Christmas Encyclopedia. Jefferson, N.C.: McFarland & Co., 2006.
- Federer, William J. There Really Is A Santa Claus: The History of Saint Nicholas & Christmas Holiday Traditions. St. Louis, Mo.: Ameriserch, 2002.
- Menendez, Albert J. Christmas in the White House. Louisville, Ky.: Westminster John Knox Press, 1983.
- Park Cultural Landscapes Program. National Park Service Cultural Landscapes Inventory: President's Park South, President's Park. National Park Service. U.S. Department of the Interior. 2010.
- Seeley, Mary Evans. Season's Greetings From the White House. Tampa, Fla.: A Presidential Christmas, 1998.
