= Biatora pausiaca =

Scientific classification
- Domain: Eukaryota
- Kingdom: Fungi
- Division: Ascomycota
- Class: Lecanoromycetes
- Order: Lecanorales
- Family: Ramalinaceae
- Genus: Biatora
- Species: B. pausiaca

Binomial name
- Biatora pausiaca Printzen & Tønsberg (2003)

Species of lichen

Biatora pausiaca is a species of corticolous (bark-dwelling), leprose lichen in the family Ramalinaceae. Found in the United States, it was formally described as a new species in 2003 by the lichenologists Christian Printzen and Tor Tønsberg. Its ascospores are 3.5–6.5 μm wide, and it does not contain any lichen products detectable with thin-layer chromatography. It is closely related to Biatora vezdana; these two species form a clade that itself has a sister relationship with Biatora radicicola.
