= Biatora terrae-novae =

Scientific classification
- Domain: Eukaryota
- Kingdom: Fungi
- Division: Ascomycota
- Class: Lecanoromycetes
- Order: Lecanorales
- Family: Ramalinaceae
- Genus: Biatora
- Species: B. terrae-novae

Binomial name
- Biatora terrae-novae Printzen & J.W.McCarthy (2016)

Species of lichen

Biatora terrae-novae is a species of corticolous (bark-dwelling) crustose lichen in the family Ramalinaceae. It is found in Newfoundland and Labrador, Canada. It was formally described as a new species in 2016 by lichenologists Christian Printzen and John McCarthy. The type specimen was collected along the Route de mon grand-père Trail in Port au Port Peninsula, where it was found growing on moss at base of a stem of balsam fir. The species contains argopsin, and norargopsin as major and minor lichen products, respectively.
