= Cliostomum falklandicum =

Scientific classification
- Kingdom: Fungi
- Division: Ascomycota
- Class: Lecanoromycetes
- Order: Lecanorales
- Family: Ramalinaceae
- Genus: Cliostomum
- Species: C. falklandicum

Binomial name
- Cliostomum falklandicum Fryday & Coppins (2012)

Species of lichen-forming fungus

Cliostomum falklandicum is a species of saxicolous (rock-dwelling) crustose lichen in the family Ramalinaceae. Found on the Falkland Islands, it was described as a new species in 2012 by Alan Fryday and Brian John Coppins. It has a dispersed thallus with only atranorin as its sole lichen product.
