= Cliostomum spribillei =

Scientific classification
- Domain: Eukaryota
- Kingdom: Fungi
- Division: Ascomycota
- Class: Lecanoromycetes
- Order: Lecanorales
- Family: Ramalinaceae
- Genus: Cliostomum
- Species: C. spribillei

Binomial name
- Cliostomum spribillei Goward & Tønsberg (2016)

Species of lichen

Cliostomum spribillei is a species of corticolous (bark-dwelling) crustose lichen in the family Ramalinaceae. It is found in the American Pacific Northwest and western Canada, where it grows on coniferous trees in old-growth forests. The lichen was formally described as a new species in 2016 by the lichenologists Trevor Goward and Tor Tønsberg. The type specimen was collected by the first author near the headwaters of Grouse Creek at an altitude of 1,750 m (5,740 ft), where it was found growing on the branches and trunks of Abies lasiocarpa in an old-growth forest. The species epithet spribillei honors lichenologist Toby Spribille "for his many significant contributions to our knowledge of northwest North American lichens".

The main characteristics of Cliostomum spribillei that distinguish it from others in genus Cliostomum are its yellowish-green, granular-sorediate thallus, and the presence of usnic acid as its sole lichen product. Its thallus forms irregular crust-like patches up to 7 cm (2.8 in) in diameter.
