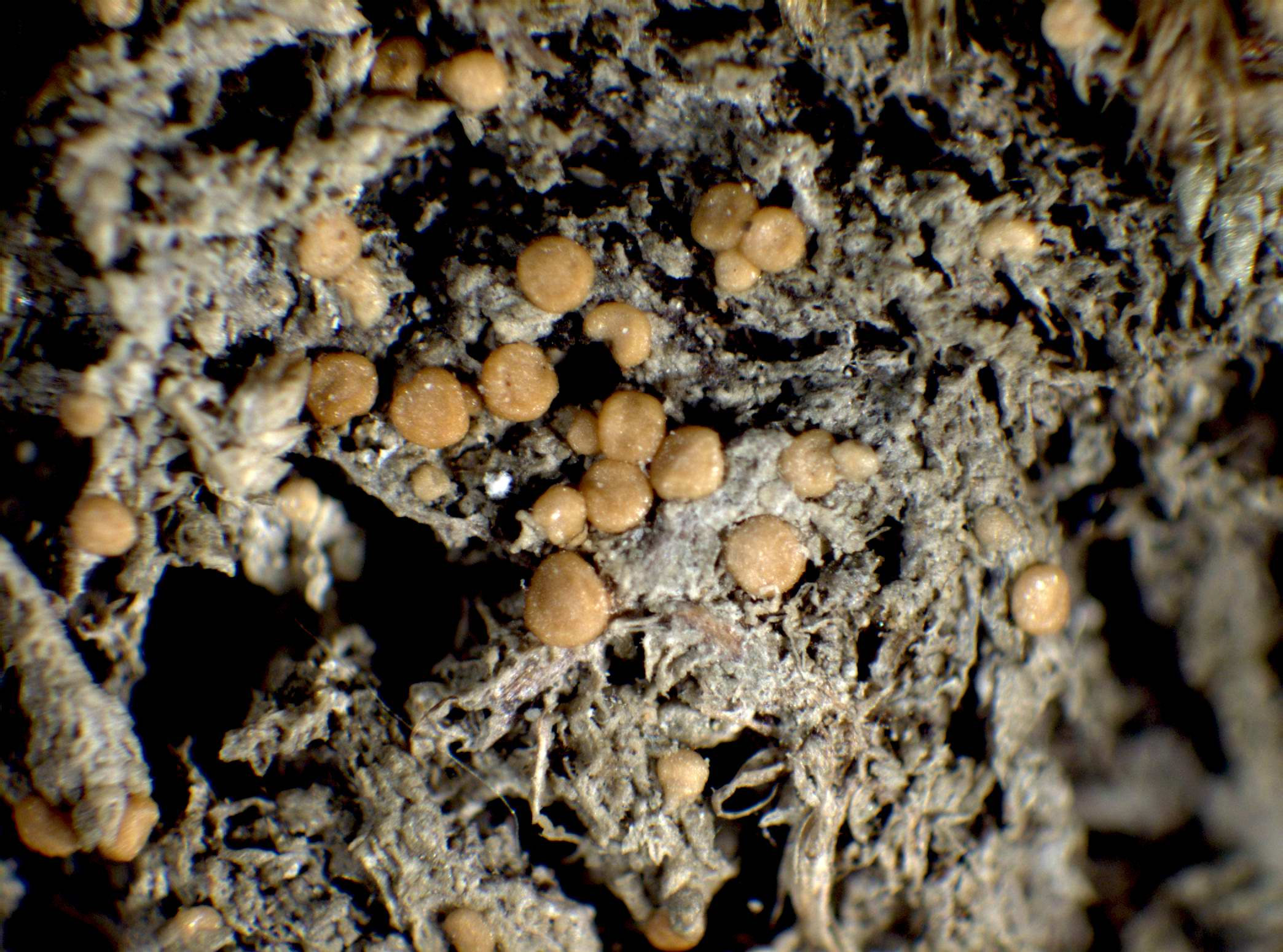

Conservation status
- Secure (NatureServe)

Scientific classification
- Kingdom: Fungi
- Division: Ascomycota
- Class: Lecanoromycetes
- Order: Lecanorales
- Family: Ramalinaceae
- Genus: Biatora
- Species: B. vernalis

Binomial name
- Biatora vernalis (L.) Fr. (1822)

= Biatora vernalis =

Species of lichen-forming fungus

Biatora vernalis is a species of lichen belonging to the family Ramalinaceae.

It is native to Eurasia and Northern America.

== See also ==
- List of lichens named by Carl Linnaeus
