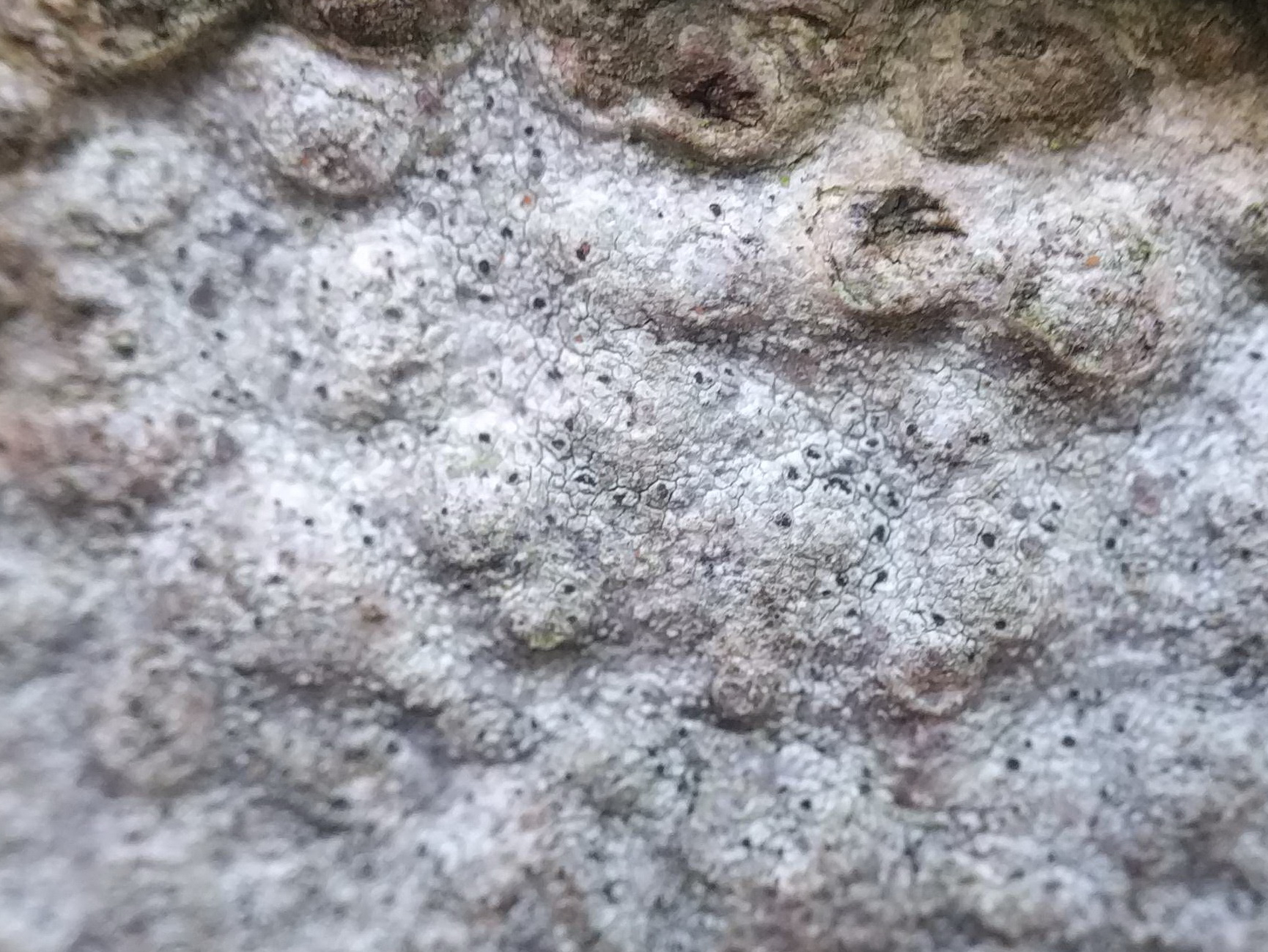
- Cliostomum griffithii

Scientific classification
- Kingdom: Fungi
- Division: Ascomycota
- Class: Lecanoromycetes
- Order: Lecanorales
- Family: Ramalinaceae
- Genus: Cliostomum; Fr. (1825)

Type species
- Cliostomum corrugatum (Ach.) Fr. (1845)

= Cliostomum =

Genus of fungi

Cliostomum is a genus of lichen-forming fungi in the family Ramalinaceae. It has about 20 species. The genus was established in 1825 by Elias Magnus Fries, who characterized it by its rounded fruiting bodies that are integrated into the lichen's crust with distinctive folded or corrugated openings. These lichens form tight crusts on various surfaces, ranging in colour from whitish to pale grey or yellowish, and reproduce primarily through conspicuous flask-shaped structures that release spores rather than through sexual fruiting bodies.

== Taxonomy ==
The genus was circumscribed by Elias Magnus Fries in 1825, with Cliostomum corrugatum assigned as the type species. In his original description, Fries characterized Cliostomum as having rounded perithecia that are integrated into the thallus, with multiple transverse folds or pleats that cause the ostiole to gape open. He noted that the subiculum (underlying fungal tissue) is absent, and placed the genus as the first tribe of Rhytisma in the second volume of his Systema Mycologicum. Fries distinguished the genus from Graphis, noting that while the latter has distinct, elongated perithecia, Cliostomum species are characterized by their rounded, integrated fruiting bodies and the distinctive folded or corrugated appearance that gives the ostiole its gaping characteristic. He also noted that the genus appears to lack external sterile tissues that are often present in related lichens.

== Taxonomy ==
Cliostomum has a crustose thallus that clings tightly to its substrate. The surface ranges from smooth to cracked-rimose, areolate, or even granular-warted, and some specimens develop powdery soredia. Thalli are whitish, pale grey, or various shades of straw to sulphur yellow, spreading irregularly and sometimes edged by a dark prothallus. Its partner alga (photobiont) is of the chlorococcoid type.

Apothecia are the chief reproductive structures. Their discs start concave, flatten with age, and only rarely become convex; the colour varies from white or pink to brown or black, and a faint frost-like pruina may be present. A thalline margin may surround the disc. The true exciple is persistent and essentially colourless but appears straw-coloured because it is packed with minute granules; its radiating hyphae measure about 1.7–2 μm across. Above this, the epithecium is straw to dark brown and similarly granular, the granules dissolving in potassium hydroxide solution (K). The hymenium is 35–50 μm tall and turns blue in iodine (I+). Numerous unbranched or sparsely branched paraphyses thread through this layer, their tips gradually club-shaped or cap-like and sometimes pigmented. Each club-shaped (clavate) ascus (Bacidia/Biatora type) holds eight colourless, smooth ascospores that are narrowly ellipsoid to rod-shaped and have zero, one, or three septa; no distinct perispore is developed.

Asexual propagation occurs in pycnidia, which may be abundant and conspicuous. These stromatic structures are 0.1–0.5 mm across, single- or multi-chambered, and have walls that are either colourless or purplish-brown above—turning a deeper purple when treated with K—becoming thinner and nearly colourless toward the base. Cylindrical conidiogenous cells inside release colourless, aseptate conidia that are drop-, ellipsoid, rod-, or bottle-shaped. The genus produces several lichen substances, among them atranorin, chloroatranorin, zeorin, fumarprotocetraric, stictic, and usnic acids, along with various fatty acids.

== Species ==
As of June 2019, Species Fungorum (in the Catalogue of Life) accept 19 species of Cliostomum.

- Cliostomum aeruginascens (Müll.Arg.) Fryday (2012)
- Cliostomum albidum Fryday (2019) – Falkland Islands
- Cliostomum coppinsii Fryday & Kantvilas (2010)
- Cliostomum corrugatum (Ach.) Fr. (1845)
- Cliostomum falklandicum Fryday & Coppins (2012) – Falkland Islands
- Cliostomum flavidulum Hafellner & Kalb (1992)
- Cliostomum griffithii (Sm.) Coppins (1980)
- Cliostomum haematommatis (Keissl.) D.Hawksw., Earl.-Benn. & Coppins (2006)
- Cliostomum leprosum (Räsänen) Holien & Tønsberg (1992)
- Cliostomum longisporum Fryday (2019) – Falkland Islands
- Cliostomum namibicum V.Wirth & Kalb (2011)
- Cliostomum ovocarpum Aptroot (2014)
- Cliostomum piceicola Holien & Tønsberg (2017)
- Cliostomum praepallidum (Müll.Arg.) Kantvilas & Fryday (2010)
- Cliostomum spribillei Goward & Tønsberg (2016)
- Cliostomum subcorrugatum van den Boom (2017)
- Cliostomum subtenerum Coppins & Fryday (2012)
- Cliostomum tenerum (Nyl.) Coppins & S.Ekman (1997)
- Cliostomum violascens (Müll.Arg.) Fryday (2012)
