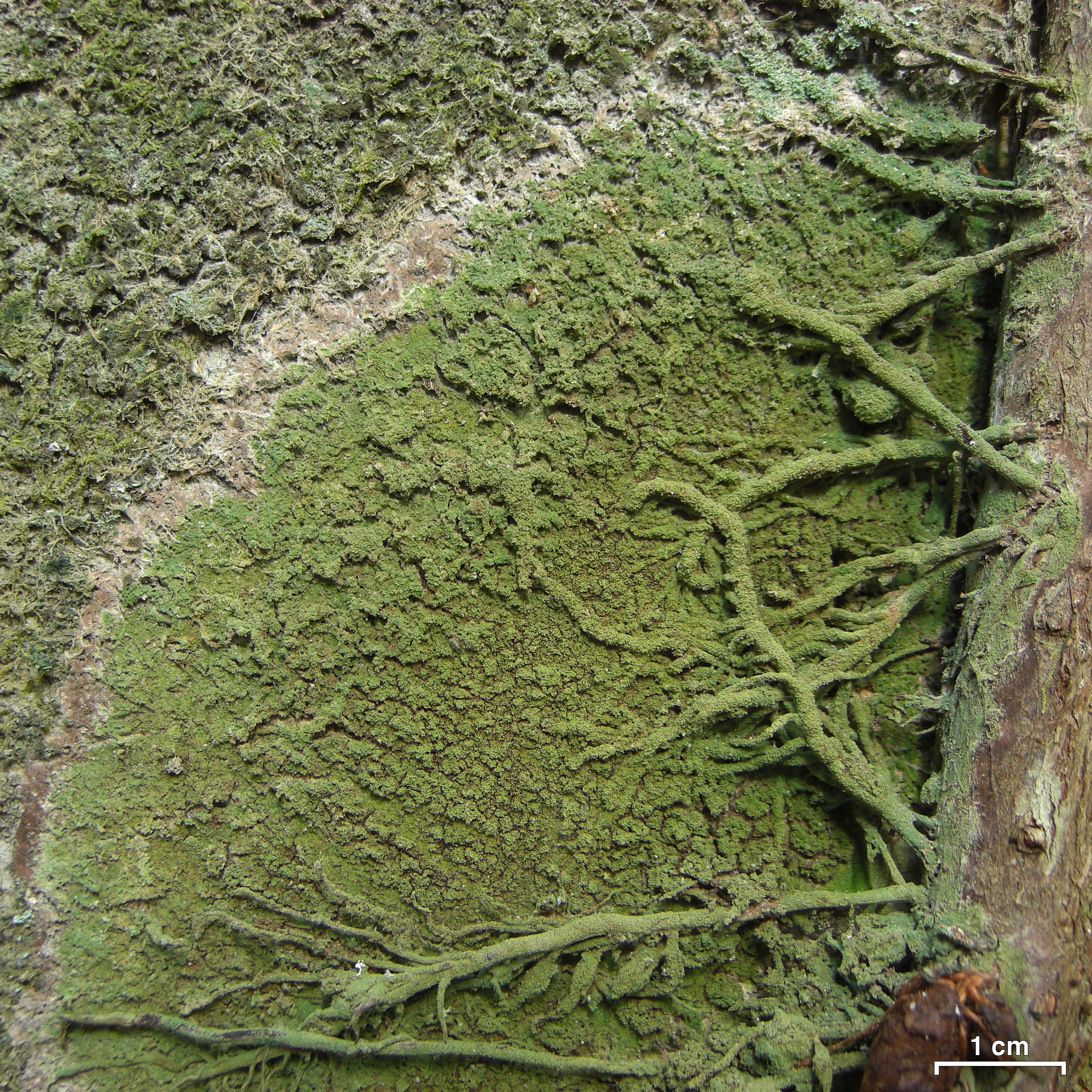
- in Fakahatchee Strand Preserve State Park, Florida

Scientific classification
- Kingdom: Fungi
- Division: Ascomycota
- Class: Lecanoromycetes
- Order: Lecanorales
- Family: Ramalinaceae
- Genus: Biatora
- Species: B. kalbii

Binomial name
- Biatora kalbii (Brako) S.Y.Kondr. (2019)

Synonyms
- Phyllopsora kalbii Brako (1991)

= Biatora kalbii =

Species of lichen

Biatora kalbii is a species of squamulose lichen in the family Ramalinaceae. It has a pantropical distribution.

== Taxonomy ==
The species was first formally described by Brazilian lichenologist Lois Brako in her 1991 monograph on the genus Biatora. The type specimen was collected in 1980 from Mato Grosso do Sul by Klaus Kalb, for whom the species in named. Sergey Kondratyuk transferred the species from genus Phyllopsora to Biatora in 2019.

== Description ==
The thallus of Biatora kalbii is made of small round to elongated, convex green squamules (scales) measuring 0.1–0.3 mm in diameter. Some scales are arranged so that they are discrete, while others may overlap; all are attached closely to the substrate. Isidia are spherical; they lengthen by budding. The prothallus is pale and thin. Apothecia (sexual reproductive structures) are common in Biatora kalbii; they are circular with a pale to dark brown disc that is either flat or slightly convex, and a margin around the disc. The ascospores are ellipsoid to short-fusiform (tapering on both ends). Pycnidia are common on the lichen surface; they appear tan-coloured spots with orange to brown ostioles immersed in the thallus. The pycnidia produce straight, rod-shaped conidia that measure 9 by 1 μm. The lichen does not produce any secondary chemicals that could be detected with standard spot tests.

== Distribution ==
Biatora kalbii has a pantropical distribution, with most records recorded from altitudes between 300 and 2,400 m (980 and 7,870 ft). Brako's original description includes records from the United States, Dominican Republic, Brazil, Kenya, and Tanzania.
