= Biatora oxneri =

Scientific classification
- Domain: Eukaryota
- Kingdom: Fungi
- Division: Ascomycota
- Class: Lecanoromycetes
- Order: Lecanorales
- Family: Ramalinaceae
- Genus: Biatora
- Species: B. oxneri

Binomial name
- Biatora oxneri (S.Y.Kondr., L.Lőkös & Hur) Printzen & Kistenich (2018)

Synonyms
- Ivanpisutia oxneri S.Y.Kondr., Lőkös & Hur (2015)

Species of lichen

Biatora oxneri is a species of corticolous (bark-dwelling) lichen in the family Ramalinaceae. It is found in the Russian Far East and in South Korea.

== Taxonomy ==
The species was formally described as new to science in 2015 by lichenologists Sergey Kondratyuk, Laszlo Lőkös, and Jae-Seoun Hur. The type specimen was collected along the Kamenisty stream (Khasan district, Primorsky Krai); there, in a deciduous forest, the lichen was found growing on the bark of a deciduous tree, closely associated with an individual of Ochrolechia pallescens that had itself been damaged by Opegrapha verseghyklarae. The species epithet honours Ukrainian lichenologist Alfred M. Oxner (1898–1973), who, according to the authors, "made important contributions to our current knowledge of Eastern and Northern Asian lichens".

Kondratyuk and colleagues initially placed the taxon in genus Ivanpisutia. Christian Printzen and Sonja Kistenich transferred the taxon to Biatora in 2018 following a comprehensive molecular phylogenetics-based reorganisation of the family Ramalinaceae.

== Description ==
Biatora oxneri has a whitish to whitish-grey crustose thallus that is 2–3 cm (0.8–1.2 in) across, although neighbouring thalli may coalesce to form larger spots. A thin (>0.2 mm wide) hypothallus is observed where the thallus border another crustose lichen. The apothecia, which are in a transitional state between biatorine- and byssoid-type, are closely attached to the thallus and measure 0.2–0.9 mm in diameter. The apothecial disc ranges in colour from dark violet to blackish violet to ink blue; it is initially concave or flat, later becoming convex. The asci are of the "Lecanorine"-type and contain eight spores. These ascospores have a shape described as narrowly bacilliform to somewhat lens-like, and measure 8–13 by 2–3.2 μm.

All of the standard chemical spot tests on the thallus are negative, while the N-test (35% solution of nitric acid) produces a violet-purple colour on the hymenium and subhymenium.

Biatora pacifica, described as new to science in 2016 from Sakhalin, is similar in appearance to B. oxneri, and the authors suggest that it may be an esorediate version (i.e., lacking soredia) of this species.

== Habitat and distribution ==
The precise range of Biatora oxneri is not well understood, as it is known only from a few scattered and isolated collections in Sakhalin, Khabarovsk, and Primorsky regions, all in the Russian Far East. In 2018 it was recorded from Jeju Island in South Korea, where it was growing on smooth bark in close association with Mikhtomia gordejevii.
