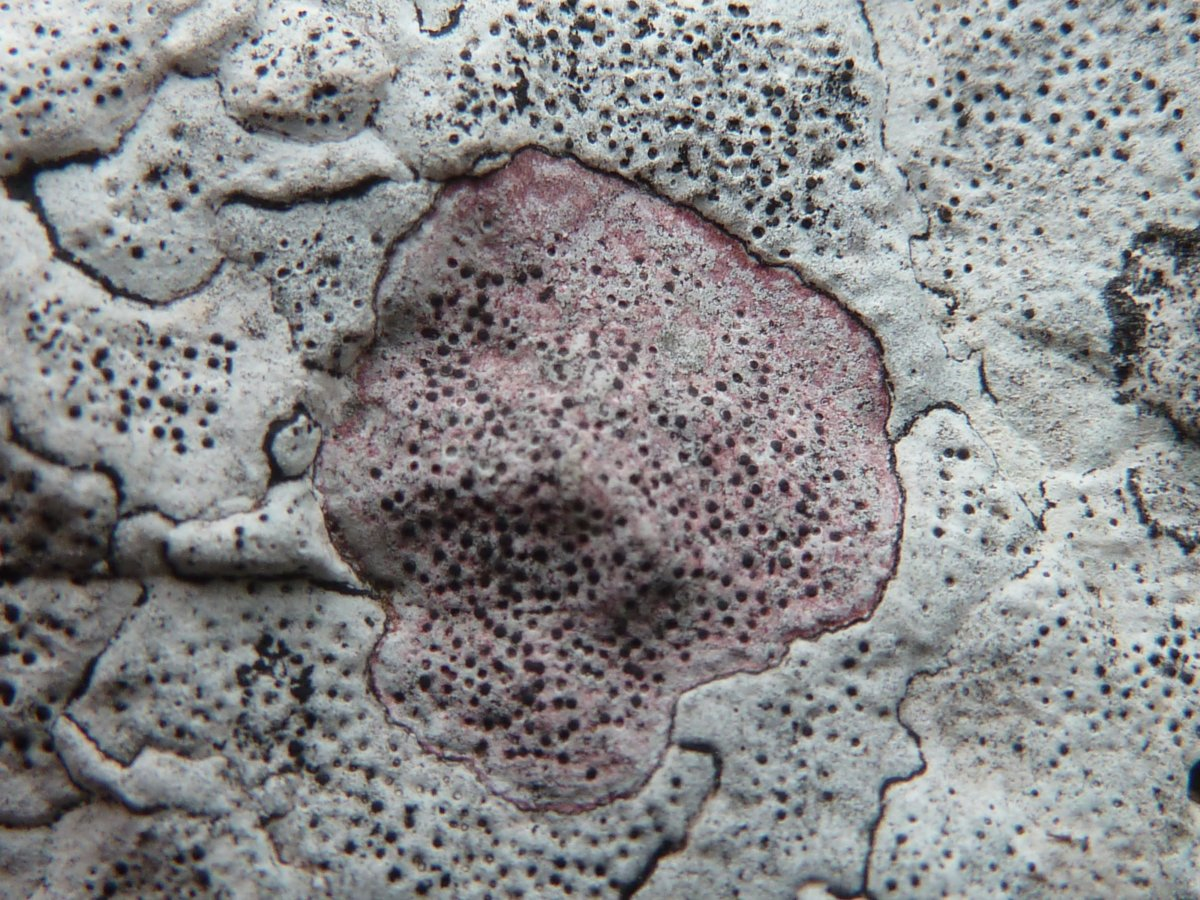
- Bagliettoa cazzae

Scientific classification
- Domain: Eukaryota
- Kingdom: Fungi
- Division: Ascomycota
- Class: Eurotiomycetes
- Order: Verrucariales
- Family: Verrucariaceae
- Genus: Bagliettoa; A.Massal. (1853)

Type species
- Bagliettoa limborioides A.Massal. (1853)

Species
- See text

= Bagliettoa =

Genus of lichens

Bagliettoa is a genus of lichen-forming fungi in the family Verrucariaceae. Bagliettoa species are endolithic, growing between the grains of solid rock. These lichens are almost invisible to the naked eye, living mostly hidden within limestone and other calcium-rich rocks with only a thin polished rim visible on the surface. They reproduce through tiny flask-shaped fruiting bodies that bore neat pits into the rock as they develop.

== Taxonomy ==
The genus was circumscribed by the Italian lichenologist Abramo Bartolommeo Massalongo in 1853. He assigned Bagliettoa limborioides as the type species. The group comprises endolithic lichens, meaning their thalli are immersed within calcareous rock substrates. For much of the twentieth century, species now placed in Bagliettoa were inconsistently classified, with many retained in the genus Verrucaria. Although Massalongo and later authors recognised some of their distinctive traits—such as a shield-like involucrellum with a star-shaped aperture—taxonomic boundaries remained unclear. In the 1930s to 1950s, Georg Hermann Zschacke and Miroslav Servít attempted revisions, with Servít introducing the superfluous genus Protobagliettoa for species lacking mature spores, complicating the classification further.

Subsequent taxonomists, including Josef Poelt and Antonín Vězda in the 1980s, transferred several species from Verrucaria into Bagliettoa on morphological grounds. A 2003 morphological revision by Josef Pepa Halda reduced many species to synonymy and narrowed the concept of the genus, yet he did not recognise Bagliettoa as distinct from Verrucaria. However, molecular phylogenetics studies beginning in the 2000s clarified that Bagliettoa forms a monophyletic group within Verrucariaceae. The type species B. limborioides was included for the first time in a multigene analysis in a 2014 study by Yuzon and colleagues. This research confirmed the genus as genetically distinct and expanded its morphological definition to include species lacking a star-shaped involucrellum, such as B. marmorea and B. calciseda.

== Description ==
Species of Bagliettoa live almost entirely inside calcareous rock, a habit termed endolithic. Only a thin, weather-polished rim betrays their presence: this may be a lithocortex—a tough rind of tightly bound fungal threads (hyphae) studded with minute calcite crystals—or a pale micrite film composed mainly of re-deposited, powder-fine limestone with few hyphae. Beneath that surface the fungus forms a loose medulla in which the lower layers often bear swollen, oil-filled cells. The green algal partner (photobiont) belongs to the genera Asterochloris or Trebouxia. Algal cells occur in discontinuous patches 50–120 micrometres (μm) deep; within each patch the algae cluster into rounded groups 25–40 μm across, each individual cell measuring about 6–12 μm in diameter. A visible prothallus—a fringe of sterile hyphae around the thallus margin—is usually absent, but adjoining colonies sometimes meet as narrow dark boundary lines.

Reproduction relies on tiny flask-shaped fruiting bodies (perithecia) that develop wholly below the rock surface, boring neat pits as they expand. Their upper wall (involucrellum) may be missing, or present only as a flat, lid-like cap over the apex; when present it often shows fine radial fissures. The main perithecial wall (exciple) varies from very pale to deep black. Inside, the colourless tissue of the hymenium reacts blue when treated with iodine (a hemiamyloid response). Short sterile threads (periphysoids) line the neck canal and upper cavity; their tips can break off and serve as microscopic propagules. Each cylindrical ascus—typical of the Verrucaria type—contains eight colourless ascospores that lack internal septa, though fully formed spores are frequently scarce or misshapen. Asexual spore-producing organs (conidiomata) are extremely rare in this genus.

== Species ==
As of June 2025, Species Fungorum (in the Catalogue of Life) accepts 21 species of Bagliettoa:

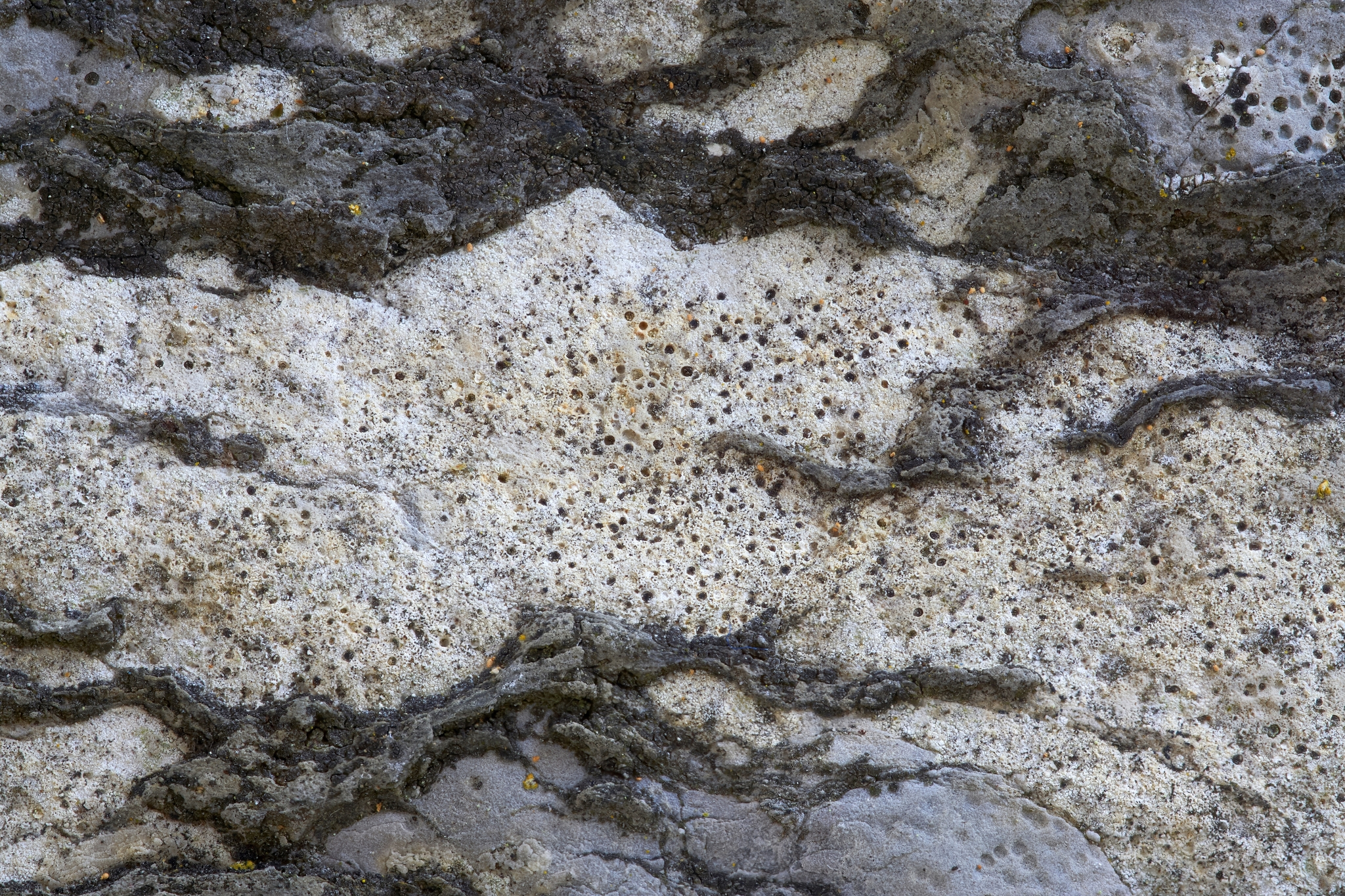
Bagliettoa calciseda

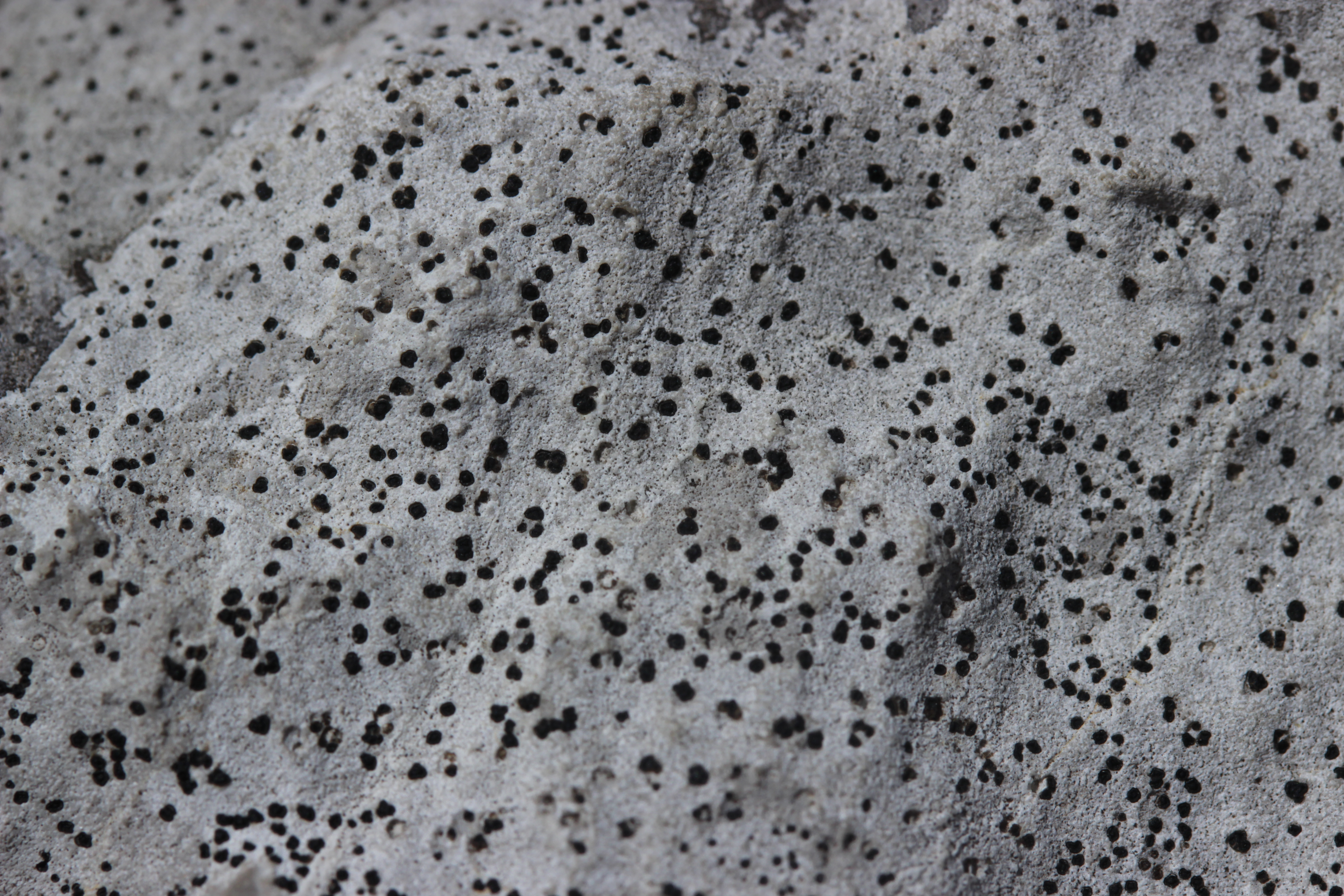
Bagliettoa parmigera

- Bagliettoa bagliettoiformis (Hazsl.) Gams (1967)
- Bagliettoa baldensis (A.Massal.) Vězda (1981)
- Bagliettoa calciseda (DC.) Gueidan & Cl.Roux (2007)
- Bagliettoa cazzae (Zahlbr.) Vězda & Poelt (1981)
- Bagliettoa ceracea (J.Steiner) Jatta (1911)
- Bagliettoa crassa Cl.Roux (2014)
- Bagliettoa crassiuscula (Servít) Hafellner (2018)
- Bagliettoa inaequata (Servít) Gams (1967)
- Bagliettoa limborioides A.Massal. (1853)
- Bagliettoa marmorea (Scop.) Gueidan & Cl.Roux (2007)
- Bagliettoa ocellata C.Knight (1876)
- Bagliettoa operculata (P.M.McCarthy) P.M.McCarthy (2008)
- Bagliettoa parmigera (J.Steiner) Vězda & Poelt (1981)
- Bagliettoa parmigerella (Zahlbr.) Vězda & Poelt (1981)
- Bagliettoa quarnerica (Zahlbr.) Vězda (1981)
- Bagliettoa rubrocincta (Breuss) Gueidan & Cl.Roux (2014)
- Bagliettoa sphinctrina (Ach.) Körb. (1855)
- Bagliettoa sphinctrinella (Zschacke) Gams (1967)
- Bagliettoa steineri (Kušan) Vězda (1981)
- Bagliettoa subconcentrica (J.Steiner) Gams (1967)
- Bagliettoa suzaeana (Servít) Gueidan & Cl.Roux (2014)
