= Cliostomum namibicum =

Scientific classification
- Kingdom: Fungi
- Division: Ascomycota
- Class: Lecanoromycetes
- Order: Lecanorales
- Family: Ramalinaceae
- Genus: Cliostomum
- Species: C. namibicum

Binomial name
- Cliostomum namibicum V.Wirth & Kalb (2011)

Species of lichen-forming fungus

Cliostomum namibicum is a species of saxicolous (rock-dwelling) crustose lichen in the family Ramalinaceae. It is found in Namibia, where it grows on siliceous rock. It was described as a new species in 2011 by Volkmar Wirth and Klaus Kalb.
