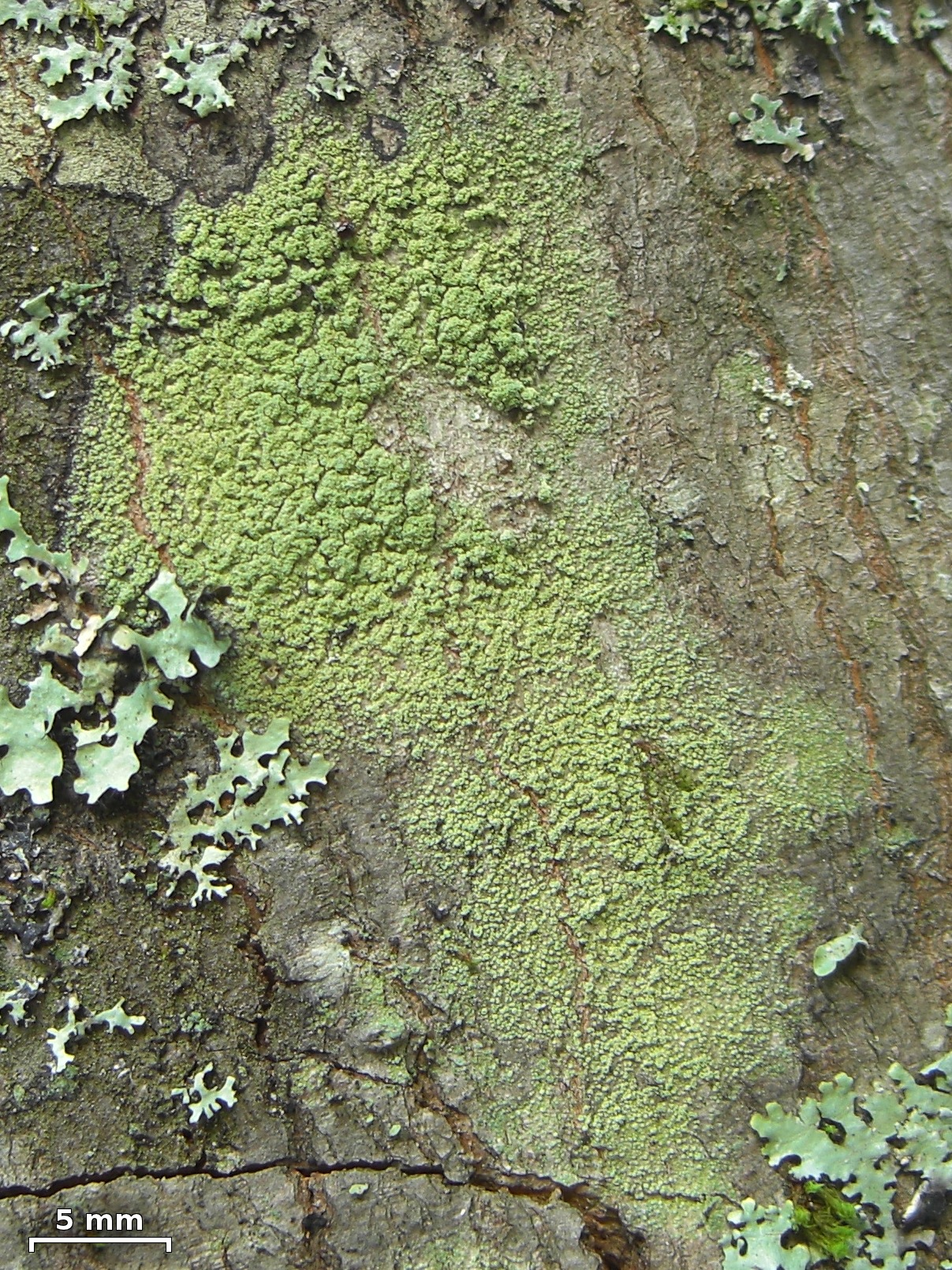

Scientific classification
- Domain: Eukaryota
- Kingdom: Fungi
- Division: Ascomycota
- Class: Lecanoromycetes
- Order: Lecanorales
- Family: Ramalinaceae
- Genus: Biatora
- Species: B. pontica

Binomial name
- Biatora pontica Printzen & Tønsberg (2003)

= Biatora pontica =

Species of lichen

Biatora pontica is a species of corticolous (bark-dwelling), leprose lichen in the family Ramalinaceae. It is a widely distributed species, having been recorded in Africa, Asia, Europe, and North America.

== Taxonomy ==
Biatora pontica was formally described as a new species in 2003 by lichenologists Christian Printzen and Tor Tønsberg. The type specimen was collected by the first author in the Trebizond vilayet southeast of Uzungöl, at an altitude of 1,300 m (4,300 ft); there, in a dense Picea orientalis forest, it was found growing on the bark of a middle-aged tree. The species epithet pontica refers to the presence of "pontica" pigments in the lichen.

== Description ==
The thallus of Biatora pontica is formed from areoles, or small rounded areas. These areoles, in the non-sorediate parts, can either be embedded within or superficially connected to the substrate. Their colour can range from a verdant green to yellowish-grey, and each areola can reach up to 1.2 mm in diameter. Bright green to yellowish-grey soralia (groups of reproductive structures) characterise this lichen, initially taking on a punctiform, or point-like shape. These soralia gradually merge over time.

The presence of apothecia, or fruiting bodies where sexual reproduction occurs, is relatively rare in Biatora pontica. These biatorine (typical to the genus Biatora), rounded, and sessile structures vary from 0.5 to 0.7 mm in diameter. A true exciple, or the rim surrounding the apothecium, is typically visible in younger apothecia only and is colourless when examined in section. The disc, located at the centre of the apothecium, takes on a shade varying from dark grey-ochre to brown-grey and is flat to slightly convex in structure. The underlying layer, or hypothecium, is mainly colourless, with fragments showcasing pigments of Pontica-blue and Pontica-red.

The hymenium, or tissue layer containing the asci (spore-bearing cells), either bears no colour or is bright olive, measuring approximately 40 μm in height. Each ascus of the Biatora type carries eight spores. These ascospores are non-septate and take on an ellipsoidal shape, their size ranging from 12 to 14 μm in length and 3.5 to 3.7 μm in width.

== Habitat and distribution ==
Biatora pontica is widely distributed in Europe, having been recorded in Austria, Italy, Norway, Poland, Russia, and Slovenia. It also occurs in Africa, Asia, and North America.
