= Biatora chrysanthoides =

Scientific classification
- Domain: Eukaryota
- Kingdom: Fungi
- Division: Ascomycota
- Class: Lecanoromycetes
- Order: Lecanorales
- Family: Ramalinaceae
- Genus: Biatora
- Species: B. chrysanthoides

Binomial name
- Biatora chrysanthoides Printzen & Tønsberg (2003)

Species of lichen

Biatora chrysanthoides is a species of corticolous (bark-dwelling), leprose lichen in the family Ramalinaceae. It is found in Norway, the Pacific Northwest of northern North America, Sweden, and Russia. It was formally described as a new species in 2003 by the lichenologists Christian Printzen and Tor Tønsberg. It contains gyrophoric acid in both the thallus and the apothecia (fruiting bodies), resulting in a C+ (quickly reddish) chemical spot test reaction. Its ascospores are 9.3–10.7 by 3.2–3.3 μm.
