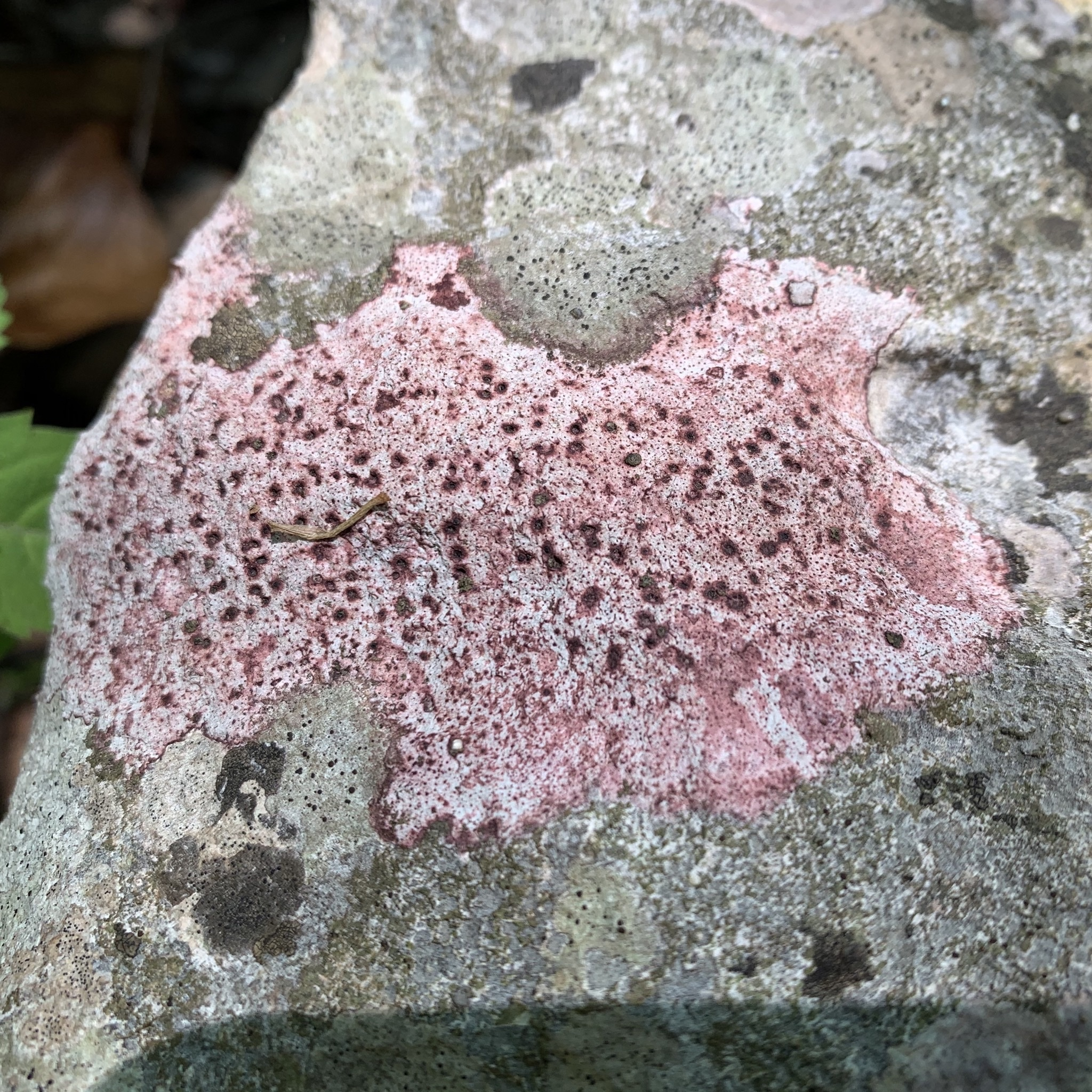

Scientific classification
- Domain: Eukaryota
- Kingdom: Fungi
- Division: Ascomycota
- Class: Eurotiomycetes
- Order: Verrucariales
- Family: Verrucariaceae
- Genus: Bagliettoa
- Species: B. marmorea

Binomial name
- Bagliettoa marmorea (Scop.) Gueidan & Cl.Roux (2007)

Synonyms
- List: Amphoridium marmoreum (Scop.) Baroni (1891); Amphoridium purpurascens A.Massal. (1853); Biatora marmorea (Scop.) Steud. & Hochst. (1826); Lecanora marmorea (Scop.) Duby (1830); Lecidea immersa var. purpurascens Jatta (1880); Lecidea wulfenii f. purpurascens Ach. (1814); Lecidea wulfenii var. purpurascens Ach. (1810); Lecidea wulfenii var. purpurascens (Hoffm.) Bory (1838); Lichen marmoreus Scop. (1772); Lichen peltatus var. purpurascens (Hoffm.) Lam. (1813); Lichen purpurascens Brot. (1805); Parmelia marmorea (Scop.) Ach. (1803); Patellaria purpurascens Duby (1830); Urceolaria wulfenii var. purpurascens Ach. (1803); Verrucaria calciseda var. purpurascens Leight. (1871); Verrucaria marmorea (Scop.) Arnold (1885); Verrucaria purpurascens Hoffm. (1790); Verrucaria rupestris var. purpurascens (Hoffm.) Schaer. (1836); Verrucaria rupestris var. purpurascens Link (1833)

= Bagliettoa marmorea =

Species of lichen

Bagliettoa marmorea is a species of saxicolous (rock-dwelling), crustose lichen in the family Verrucariaceae. It is endolithic on calcareous rocks, meaning it grows under and around the rock crystals. The colour of the lichen is purple to pink, although sometimes it is grey with purple pigments visible only around the perithecia. It does not have a shield-shaped involucrellum, which is typical of several other species in genus Bagliettoa. The excipulum (the rim of tissue around the ascomata) measures 0.2–0.3 mm in diameter and lacks colour other than the upper part, which is purple. Ascospores are 13–30 by 9–15 μm.

Bagliettoa marmorea is widespread in Europe. It has also been recorded from North America, although it is not certain if this represents a distinct species.

The lichen was first scientifically described by Italian naturalist Giovanni Antonio Scopoli in 1772, as a member of the eponymous genus Lichen. It had been shuffled to several genera in its taxonomic history, before being transferred to Bagliettoa in 2007.
