= Biatora radicicola =

Scientific classification
- Domain: Eukaryota
- Kingdom: Fungi
- Division: Ascomycota
- Class: Lecanoromycetes
- Order: Lecanorales
- Family: Ramalinaceae
- Genus: Biatora
- Species: B. radicicola

Binomial name
- Biatora radicicola Printzen, Palice & J.P.Halda (2016)

Species of lichen

Biatora radicicola is a species of corticolous (bark-dwelling) and saxicolous (rock-dwelling), crustose lichen in the family Ramalinaceae. It is found in various locations in Europe, where it grows in sheltered and humid microhabitats, often on exposed root bark at the base of trees.

== Taxonomy ==
The lichen was formally described as a new species in 2016 by Christian Printzen, Zdeněk Palice, and Josef Halda. The type specimen was collected by Halda from Nové Město nad Metují at an altitude of 361 m (1,184 ft); there, the lichen was found growing on the bark of the exposed roots of Carpinus betulus. The species epithet radicicola combines the Latin word rādīce (root) and the suffix -cola ("one who inhabits") to refer to its preferred habitat.

== Description ==
The dull green-grey to olive-green crustose thallus of Biatora radicicola has irregular cracks and sometimes tiny warts on an otherwise smooth surface. There is no visible hypothallus, and the lichen also lacks the vegetative propagules soredia and isidia. The photobiont partner of the lichen is chlorococcoid, i.e., green algae cells that are roughly spherical, and these cells measure 5–12 μm in diameter. Apothecia are abundant, typically occurring singly although occasionally in small clusters of two to five. They are spherical to somewhat deformed, measuring 0.23–0.39 mm in diameter (with a maximum measured diameter of 0.8 mm); the disc is flat and either black or more rarely a mixture olive, grey and beige hues. The asci are of the Biatora-type and contain eight spores. Ascospores are colourless with a narrowly ellipsoid shape, usually lack a septum (rarely, some spores have a single septum) and typically measure 8.3 –10.4 by 2.9–3.5 μm. No lichen products were detected using thin-layer chromatography, but the apothecia contain an insoluble pigment named Cinereorufa-green in addition to an unidentified brown pigment.

== Habitat and distribution ==
Biatora radicicola prefers to grow on the exposed roots of trees, and also below overhangs, especially along river banks. The authors suggest that the lichen is able to tolerate flooding and note that some of the collected specimens were subject to occasional water spray. Generally, B. radicicola is not found with other accompanying lichens, and is often poorly developed. The habitat data accumulated so far suggests that the species is shade tolerant, and somewhat nitrophytic (i.e., thriving in nitrogen-rich habitats) or nitrogen tolerant. Specimens collected from well-lit locations tend to be better developed, with greater apothecial pigmentation and thalli that are thicker and paler.

Documented localities for the lichen include several places in Europe, including the Czech Republic, Ukraine, the Republic of Adygea in the Russian North Caucasus, Finland, Norway, and Sweden. Specimens collected from latter two countries were all growing on rocks near rapids subjected to water spray.
