= Inland rainforest =

Temperate rainforest in the Central Interior of British Columbia

The inland rainforest, also known as the inland temperate rainforest in the classification system of the WWF, is a temperate rainforest in the Central Interior of British Columbia. It is part of the Interior Cedar Hemlock (ICH) zone of the biogeoclimatic zones system developed by the BC Ministry of Forests, in the Rocky Mountain Trench. One of the richest parts of this wet belt lies 110 kilometres (68 mi) east of the city of Prince George and nearly a thousand kilometres (600 miles) east of the coastal rainforests. The oldest and most diverse parts of the forest are typically found on northeasterly aspect wet toe slopes, with Western Red Cedar (Thuja plicata) trees over 1,000 years old and undisturbed forest stands much older than that. Some of these toe-slope benches were cleared in the 1960s to develop the Yellowhead Highway, with the added result that most of the remainder became easily accessible to industrial logging and recreation, and more recently to research and interpretation. As a consequence there are only a handful of the best sites left undisturbed in 2008.

In 1987, a science-based conservation group Save-The-Cedar League was formed. With the establishment of the new University of Northern British Columbia (UNBC) in Prince George the 1990s, further research continued to highlight the significance of the ICH zone east of the city. The arrival of a defoliating insect outbreak, the Hemlock Looper, Lambdina fiscellaria fiscellaria, resulted in increased salvage logging of old cedar stands along the Yellowhead Highway. This was reduced by the province's chief forester in the early 2000s as the appreciation of non-timber values of the zone began to be realized and as the Mountain Pine Beetle catastrophe spread across the Interior Plateau to the west and large-scale salvage logging moved in that direction.

As the Mountain Pine Beetle wave passes, attention is returning to the mountain wet zones. Some of this came to a head in 2006 with the development of an old growth forest trail by the nearby small community of Dome Creek in the richest site yet found, a place that was also scheduled to be logged. The resulting socio-economic and ecological issues were investigated in a documentary film, Block 486.

== Ecology and caribou forage ==
The inland rainforest of interior British Columbia is a snow-laden mountain rainforest where deep winter snowpacks and old-growth conifer canopies foster exceptional loads of epiphytic "hair" lichens (mainly Bryoria and Alectoria). Those lichens underpin the winter ecology of deep-snow mountain caribou, which spend roughly five to six months feeding almost exclusively on them from the snow surface. Synthesis of canopy studies shows that stand-level lichen "hyperabundance" is largely confined to forests older than about 120–150 years, because the branch architecture, ventilation and stability needed for heavy loads develop late in succession. Industrial logging has fragmented this biome and depressed canopy-lichen loads; the rainforest now functions as the caribou's remaining stronghold, so conservation hinges on maintaining large, connected tracts of unmanaged old growth across elevations, as short-rotation and partial-cut systems do not recreate equivalent forage conditions.

== Climate change effects ==
The Interior Cedar Hemlock (ICH) zone is of particular significance with respect to climate change. Climatic warming projections suggest that by mid-century or soon afterwards, this location may be at the southerly extent of the ICH. The ICH zone will also have spread throughout much of the Prince George area and farther north. The Rocky Mountain Trench east of Prince George therefore offers the last best chance to preserve some of the rare 'Tier-1' ICH sites.
