= Toby Spribille =

North American lichenologist

- Education: University of Graz
- Scientific career
- Fields: lichenology
- Author abbrev. (botany): T.Sprib.

Toby Spribille is a lichenologist, specialising in evolution and taxonomy. He identified the presence of yeast cells as an additional fungal component of some lichens. He works at University of Alberta and is the Canada Research Chair in Symbiosis.

== Early life, education and personal life ==
Toby Spribille was born in the US and educated at home. He was interested in science but lacked conventional qualifications. Therefore, he studied at University of Göttingen in Germany. He subsequently studied for a doctorate at the University of Graz, Austria which was awarded in 2011.

== Career ==
He first worked in forestry. After academic study in Europe, he undertook postdoctoral research at both the University of Graz and University of Montana between 2012 and 2017. Spiribille worked with John McCutcheon at University of Montana to apply molecular biology methods to the lichen symbiosis. He was then able to take up a post as an associate professor in biological sciences at the University of Alberta in Canada in 2017. In 2016, he received the Aino Henssen Award, presented by the International Association for Lichenology.

His research focuses on lichens, especially their evolution, ecology and diversity. He uses technologies from microscopy and molecular biology. In 2016, he and colleagues identified the presence of basidiomycota yeasts within the structure of lichen species in North America through using a combination of microscopy and molecular genetic methods. This was a new, unexpected, discovery since lichens were considered to consist of one fungus and one (or two) photosynthetic algal or bacterial components. The additional fungal component has also been found in lichens around the world. This discovery has added to understanding of the lichen symbiosis, and the gradation between parasitism and mutualism. Spribille has also identified, or revised the nomenclature, of several species of northern American lichens.

The North American lichen Cliostomum spribillei was named in his honour in 2016.

== Publications ==
Spribille is the author or co-author of over 45 scientific publications. The most significant include:

- Toby Spribille, Veera Tuovinen, Philipp Resl, Dan Vanderpool, Heimo Wolinski, M Catherine Aime, Kevin Schneider, Edith Stabentheiner, Merje Toome-Heller, Göran Thor, Helmut Mayrhofer, Hanna Johannesson, John P McCutcheon (2016) Basidiomycete yeasts in the cortex of ascomycete macrolichens. Science 353 488-492
- Ana Crespo, Frank Kauff, Pradeep K Divakar, Ruth del Prado, Sergio Pérez-Ortega, Guillermo Amo de Paz, Zuzana Ferencova, Oscar Blanco, Beatriz Roca-Valiente, Jano Núñez-Zapata, Paloma Cubas, Arturo Argüello, John A Elix, Theodore L Esslinger, David L Hawksworth, Ana Millanes, M Carmen Molina, Mats Wedin, Teuvo Ahti, Andre Aptroot, Eva Barreno, Frank Bungartz, Susana Calvelo, Mehmet Candan, Mariette Cole, Damien Ertz, Bernard Goffinet, Louise Lindblom, Robert Lücking, Francois Lutzoni, Jan-Eric Mattsson, María Inés Messuti, Jolanta Miadlikowska, Michele Piercey-Normore, Victor J Rico, Harrie JM Sipman, Imke Schmitt, Toby Spribille, Arne Thell, Göran Thor, Dalip K Upreti, H Thorsten Lumbsch (2010) Phylogenetic generic classification of parmelioid lichens (Parmeliaceae, Ascomycota) based on molecular, morphological and chemical evidence. Taxon 59 1735-1753

== See also ==
- Category:Taxa named by Toby Spribille
