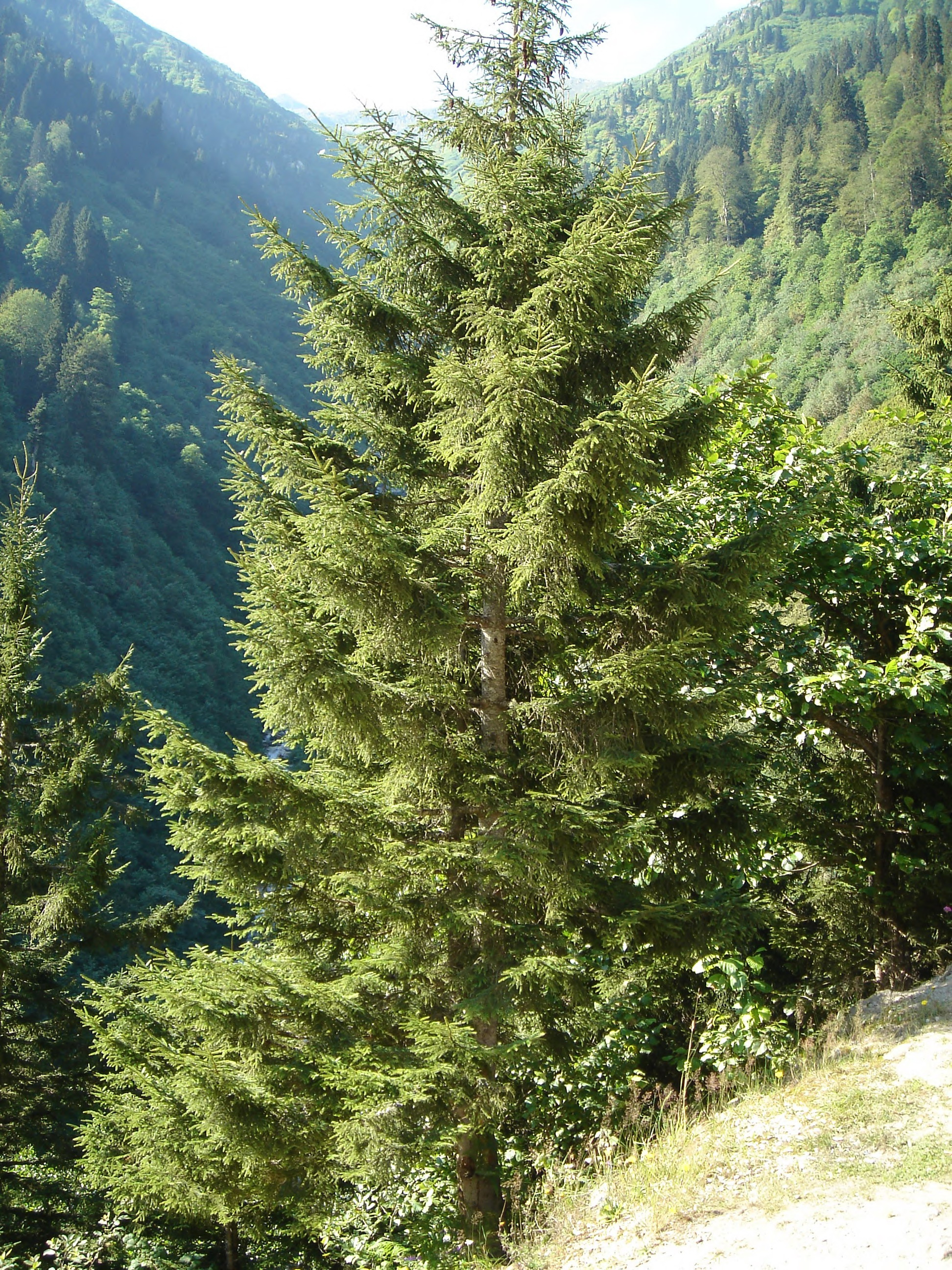

Conservation status
- Least Concern (IUCN 3.1)

Scientific classification
- Kingdom: Plantae
- Clade: Tracheophytes
- Clade: Gymnospermae
- Division: Pinophyta
- Class: Pinopsida
- Order: Pinales
- Family: Pinaceae
- Genus: Picea
- Species: P. orientalis

Binomial name
- Picea orientalis (L.) Link
- Continuous range ✖ Isolated population

= Picea orientalis =

Caucasian spruce

Species of conifer

Picea orientalis, commonly known as the Oriental spruce or Caucasian spruce, is a species of spruce native to the Caucasus and adjacent northeast Turkey.

== Description ==
It is a large coniferous evergreen tree growing to 30–40 metres (98–131 ft) tall (exceptionally to 57 m), and with a trunk diameter of up to 1.5 m (rarely up to 2.3 m).

The shoots are buff-brown and moderately pubescent (hairy). The leaves are needle-like, the shortest of any spruce, 6–8 mm long, rhombic in cross-section, glossy dark green with inconspicuous stomatal lines. The cones are slender cylindric-conic, 5–9 cm long and 1.5 cm broad, green or red to purple when young, maturing dark brown 5–7 months after pollination, and have stiff, smoothly rounded scales.

== Cultivation ==
It is a popular ornamental tree in large gardens, valued in northern Europe and the USA for its attractive foliage and ability to grow on a wide range of soils. It is also grown to a small extent in forestry for Christmas trees, timber and paper production, though its slower growth compared to Norway spruce reduces its importance outside of its native range. P. orientalis and the cultivars 'Aurea' and 'Skylands' have gained the Royal Horticultural Society's Award of Garden Merit. A frequently seen ornamental cultivar is Picea orientalis 'Aureospicata', which has gold-coloured young foliage in the spring.

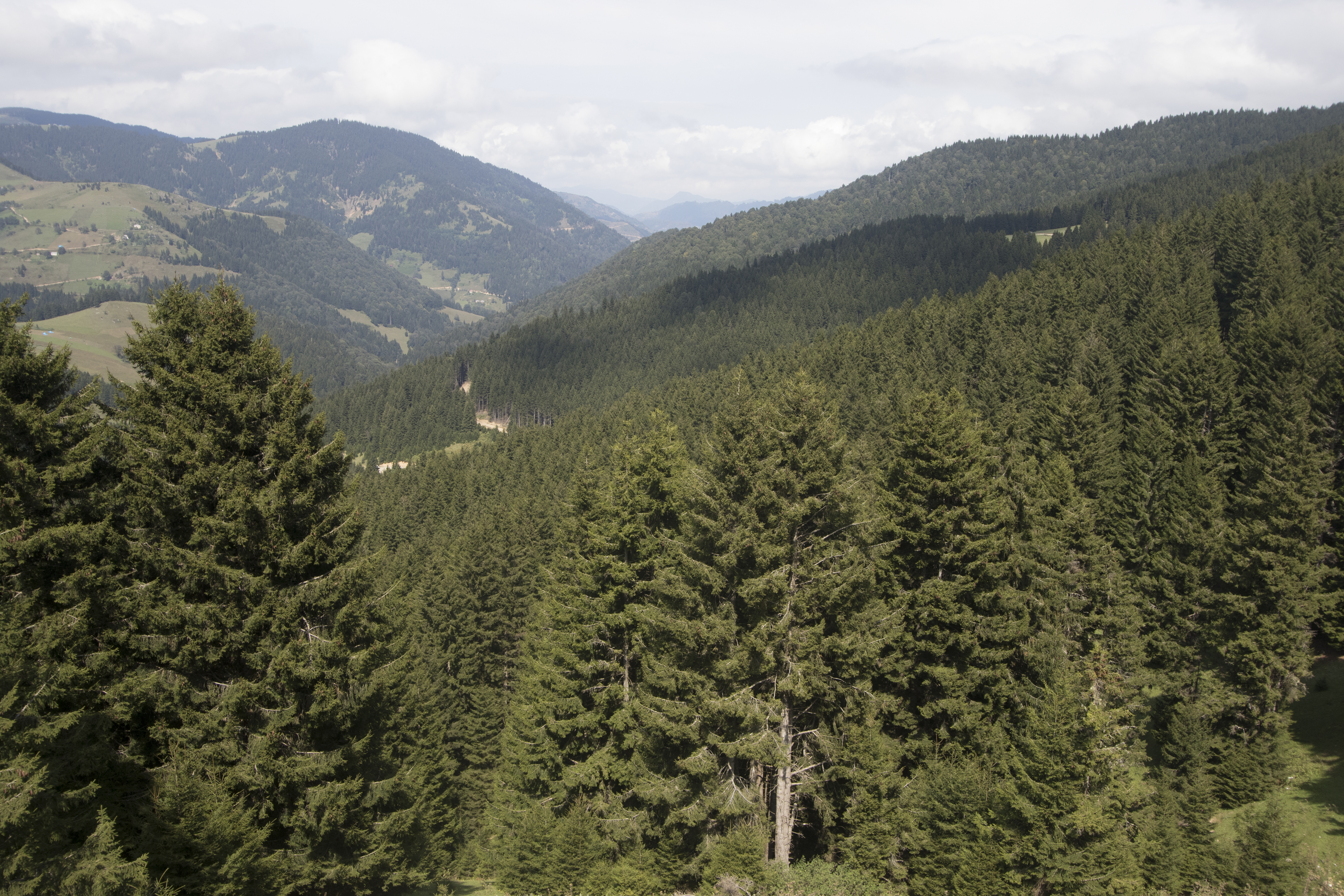
Picea orientalis forest, Giresun, Turkey

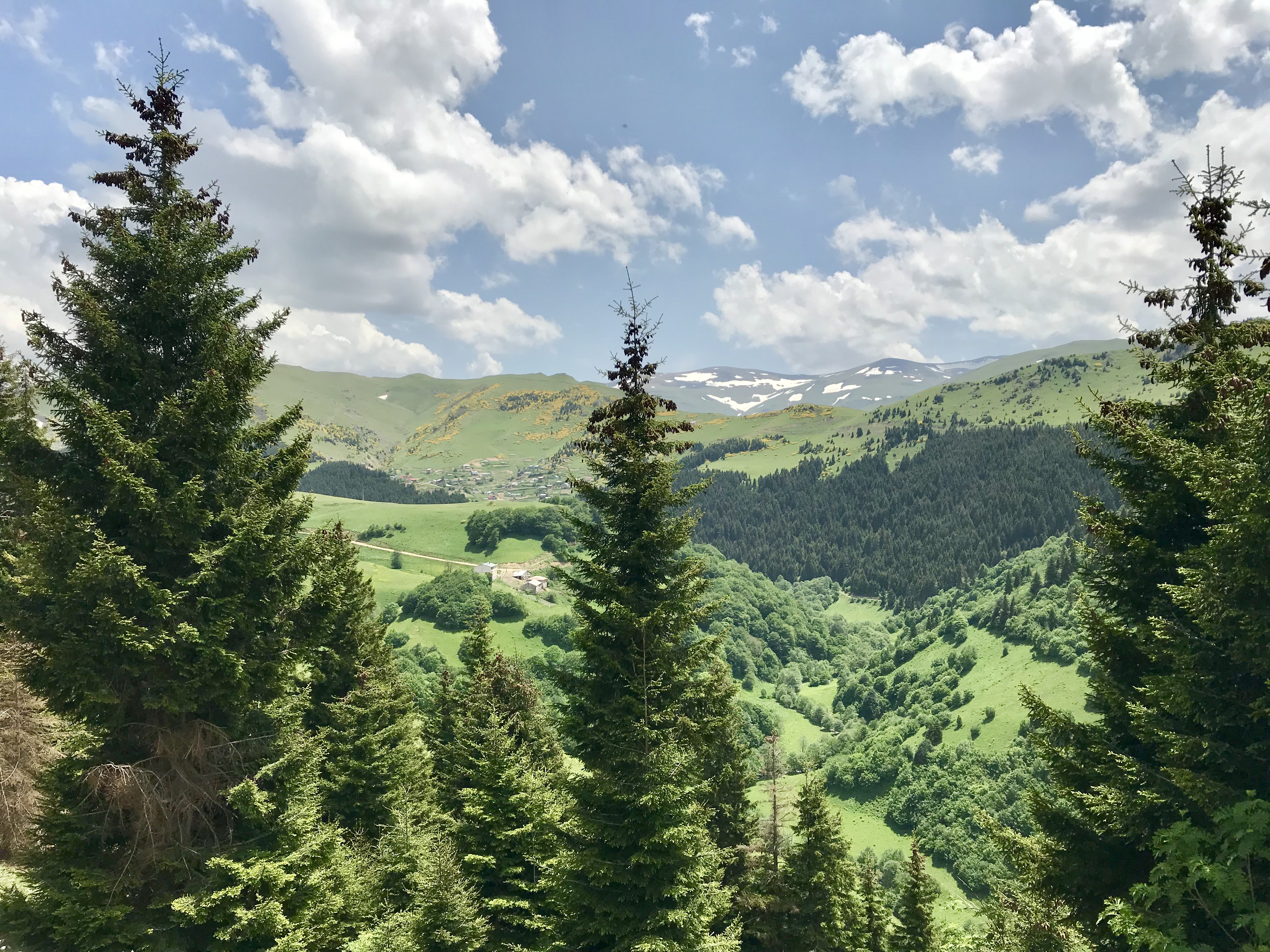
Trees in habitat, Giresun, Turkey

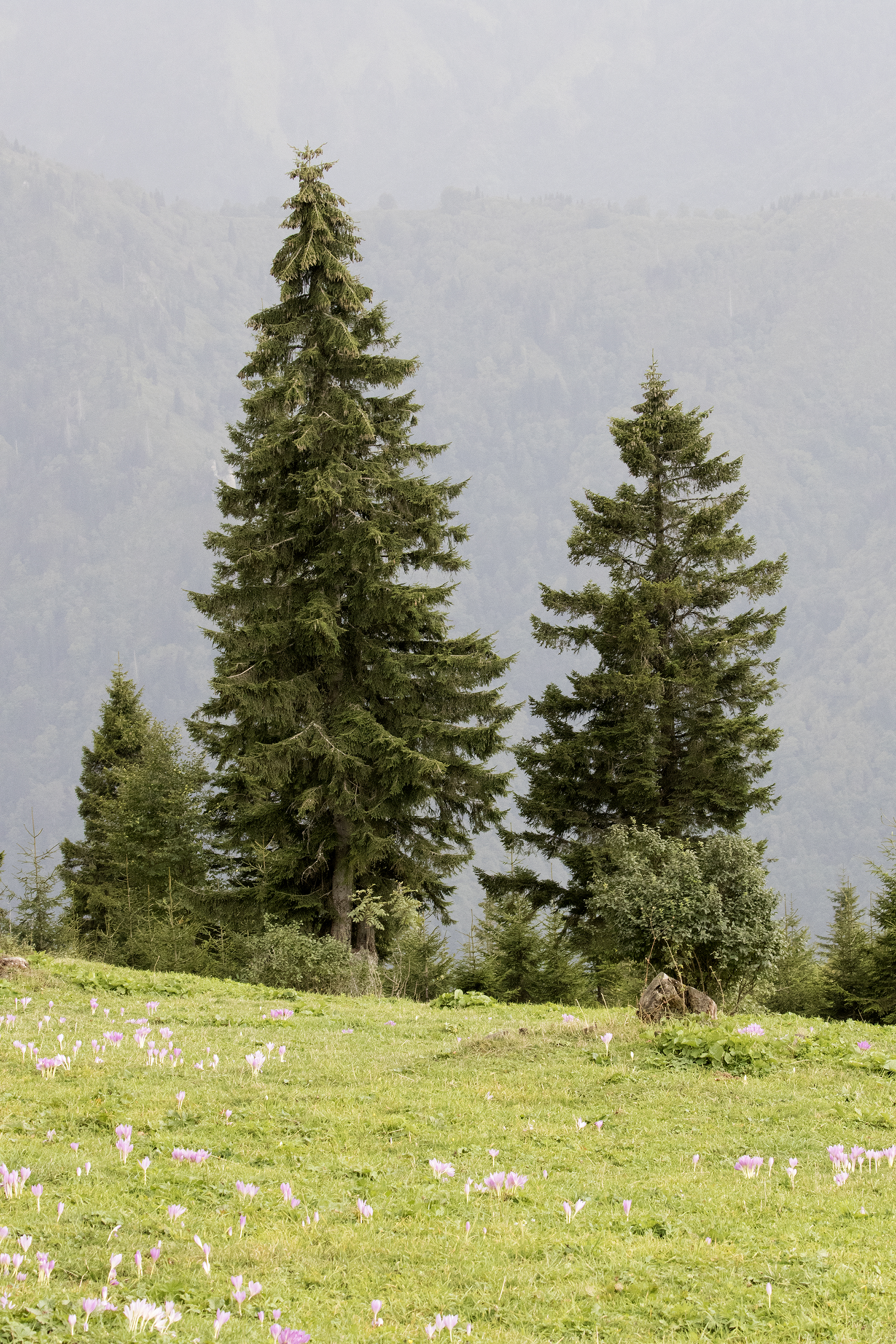
Mature trees, Trabzon, Turkey

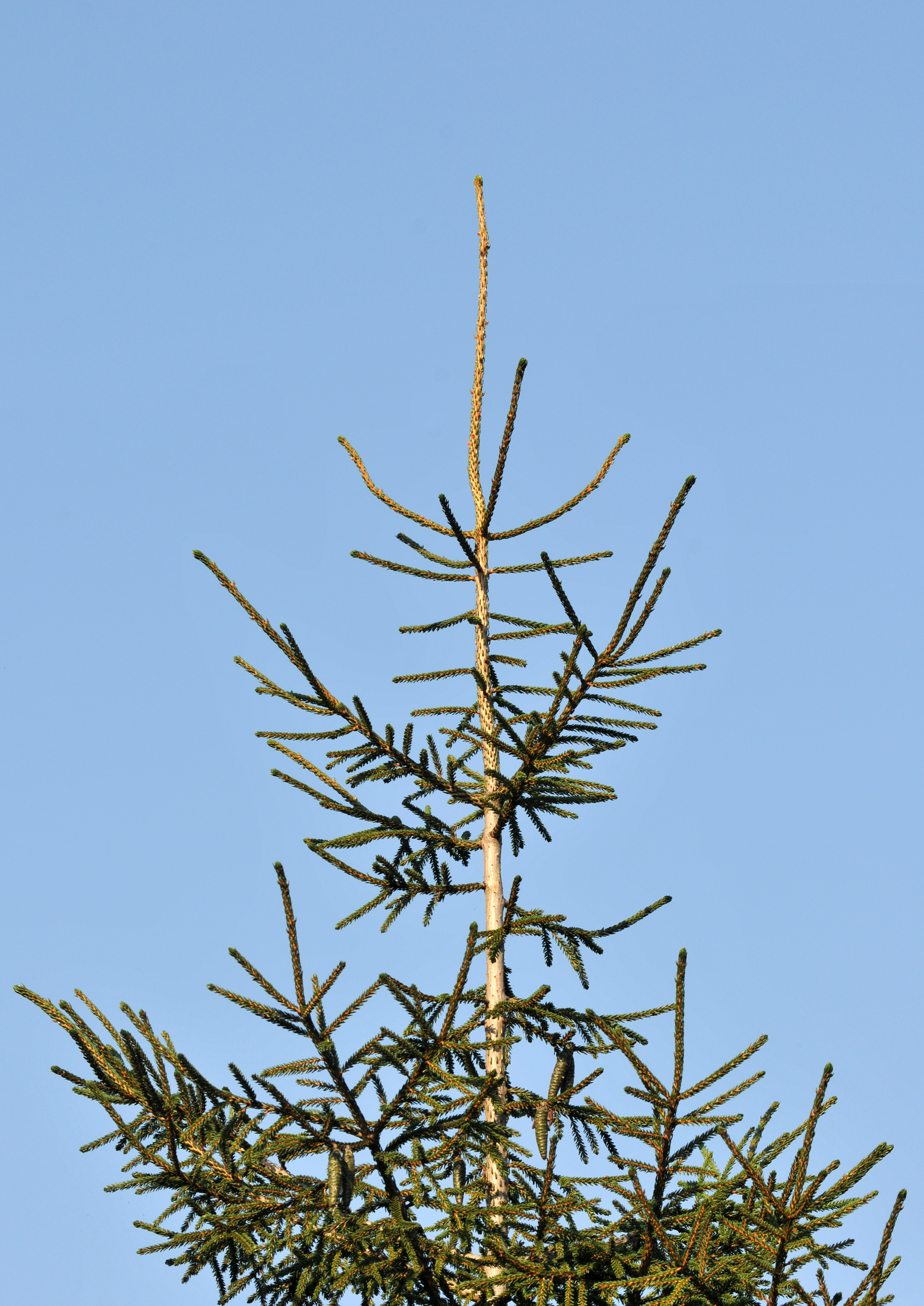
Foliage at the top of a young tree, Giresun, Turkey

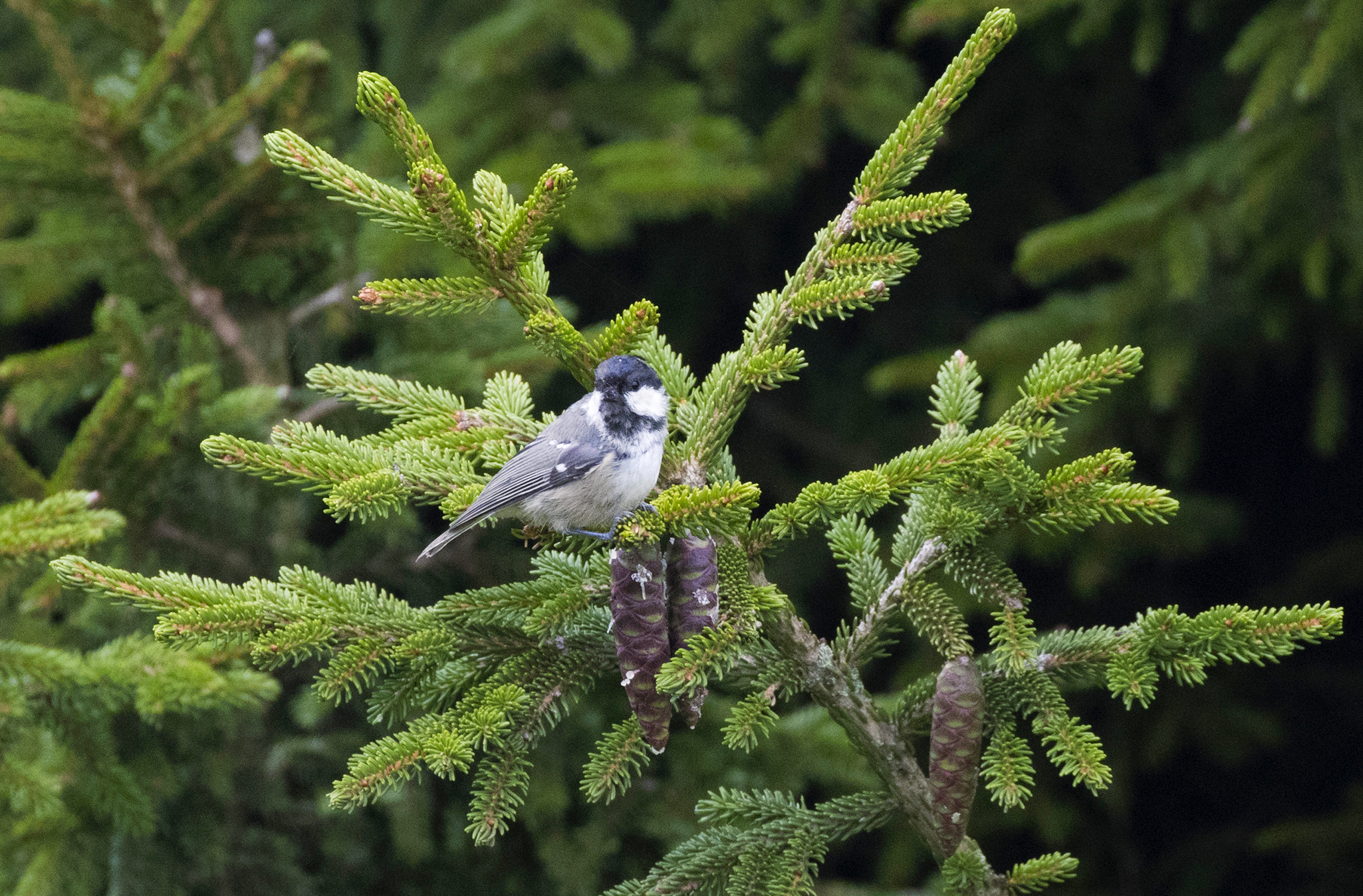
Foliage and cones (with a coal tit), Giresun, Turkey

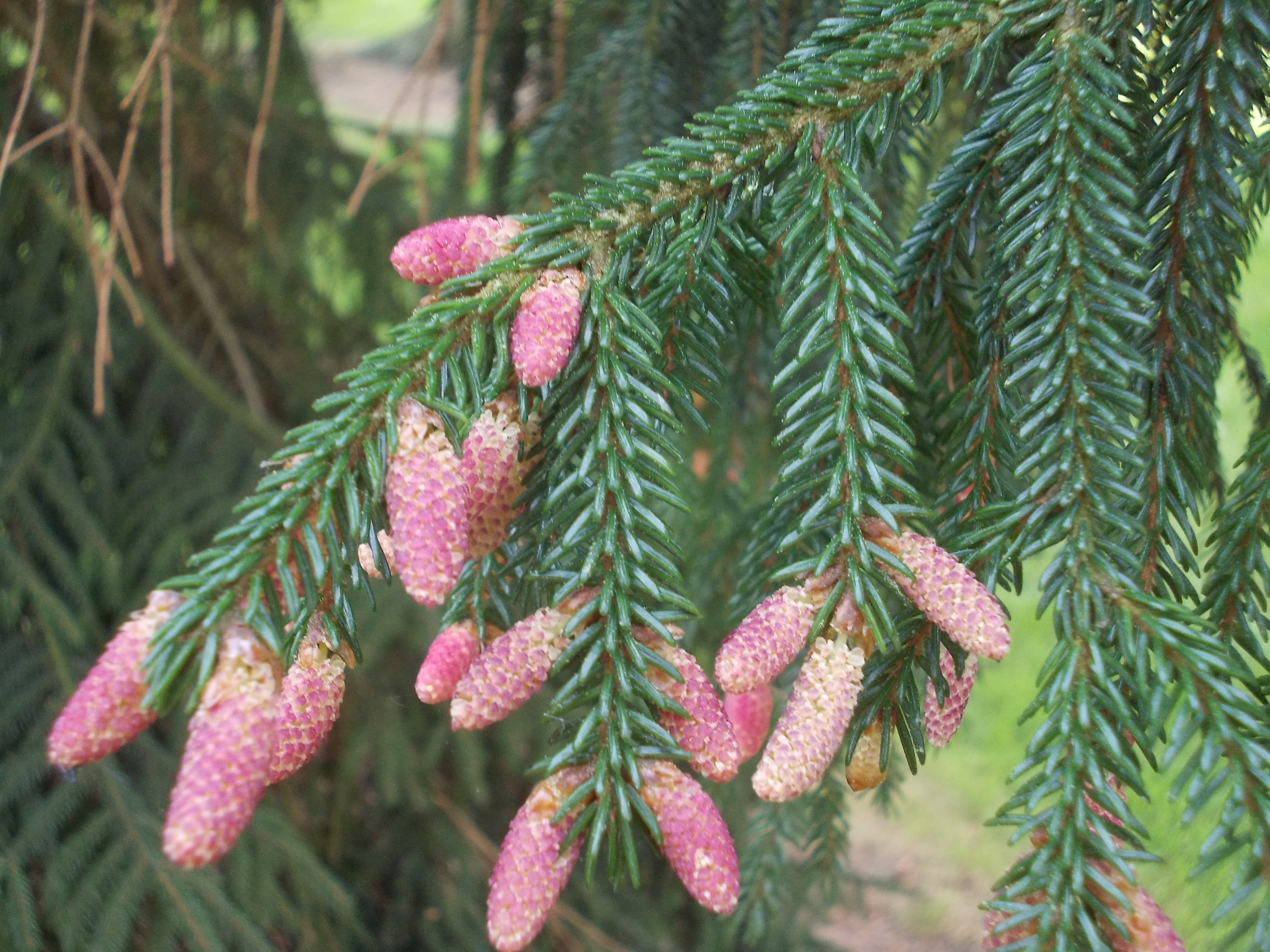
Pollen cones of cultivar 'Aurea'
