= Argopsin =

Chemical compound

Names
- IUPAC name 2,8-Dichloro-9-hydroxy-3-methoxy-1,4,7-trimethyl-6-oxobenzo[b][1,4]benzodioxepine-10-carbaldehyde
- Other names 1-Chloropannarin

Identifiers
CAS Number	52809-10-6
3D model (JSmol)	Interactive image
ChEBI	CHEBI:144113
ChEMBL	ChEMBL1982613
ChemSpider	142840
PubChem CID	162698
CompTox Dashboard (EPA)	DTXSID60200786
- InChI: InChI=1S/C18H14Cl2O6/c1-6-10-17(9(5-21)13(22)11(6)19)25-15-7(2)12(20)14(24-4)8(3)16(15)26-18(10)23/h5,22H,1-4H3 Key: SNNDIPJEAQAKTJ-UHFFFAOYSA-N
- SMILES: CC1=C2C(=C(C(=C1Cl)O)C=O)OC3=C(C(=C(C(=C3OC2=O)C)OC)Cl)C

Properties
Chemical formula	C_{18}H_{14}Cl_{2}O_{6}
Molar mass	397.20 g·mol^{−1}
- Except where otherwise noted, data are given for materials in their standard state (at 25 °C [77 °F], 100 kPa). Infobox references

Argopsin, also known as 1-chloropannarin, is a secondary metabolite produced by many lichen species, such as Biatora cuprea and Micarea lignaria.

Argopsin (also known as 1'-chloropannarin) is a chlorinated depsidone compound first isolated from the lichen Argopsis friesiana by Siegfried Huneck and Elke Mackenzie in 1975. It was independently discovered by both Huneck and Mackenzie's team and by Bodo and Molho in the same year. The structure was confirmed through multiple analytical methods including mass spectrometry, which showed characteristic isotope peaks at mass-to-charge ratios (m/z) of 396, 398, and 400 in a 9:6:1 ratio, indicating the presence of two chlorine atoms. Its UV spectrum matched that of pannarin, and infrared spectroscopy revealed characteristic aldehyde (1725 cm⁻¹) and hydroxyl (3500 cm⁻¹) bands. The researchers synthesized argopsin by chlorinating pannarin in acetic acid, which produced a compound identical to the naturally occurring substance. This synthesis also helped confirm a recently revised chemical structure of pannarin, correcting an earlier proposed structure from 1941.

In the lichen A. friesiana, argopsin occurs alongside atranorin, though its presence is described as "inconstant". The related species A. megalospora does not contain argopsin but instead contains various combinations of other lichen substances including atranorin, fumarprotocetraric acid, psoromic acid, and perlatolic acid. The compound produces a red color when treated with ferric chloride in ethanol and an orange color with p-phenylenediamine in ethanol, characteristics useful for its identification.

== Uses ==
Argopsin can have photohemolytic effect when activated under ultraviolet light with a wavelength of 366 nm.

Argopsin has been shown to have an in vitro effect on Leishmania at a concentration of 50 μg/ml.
