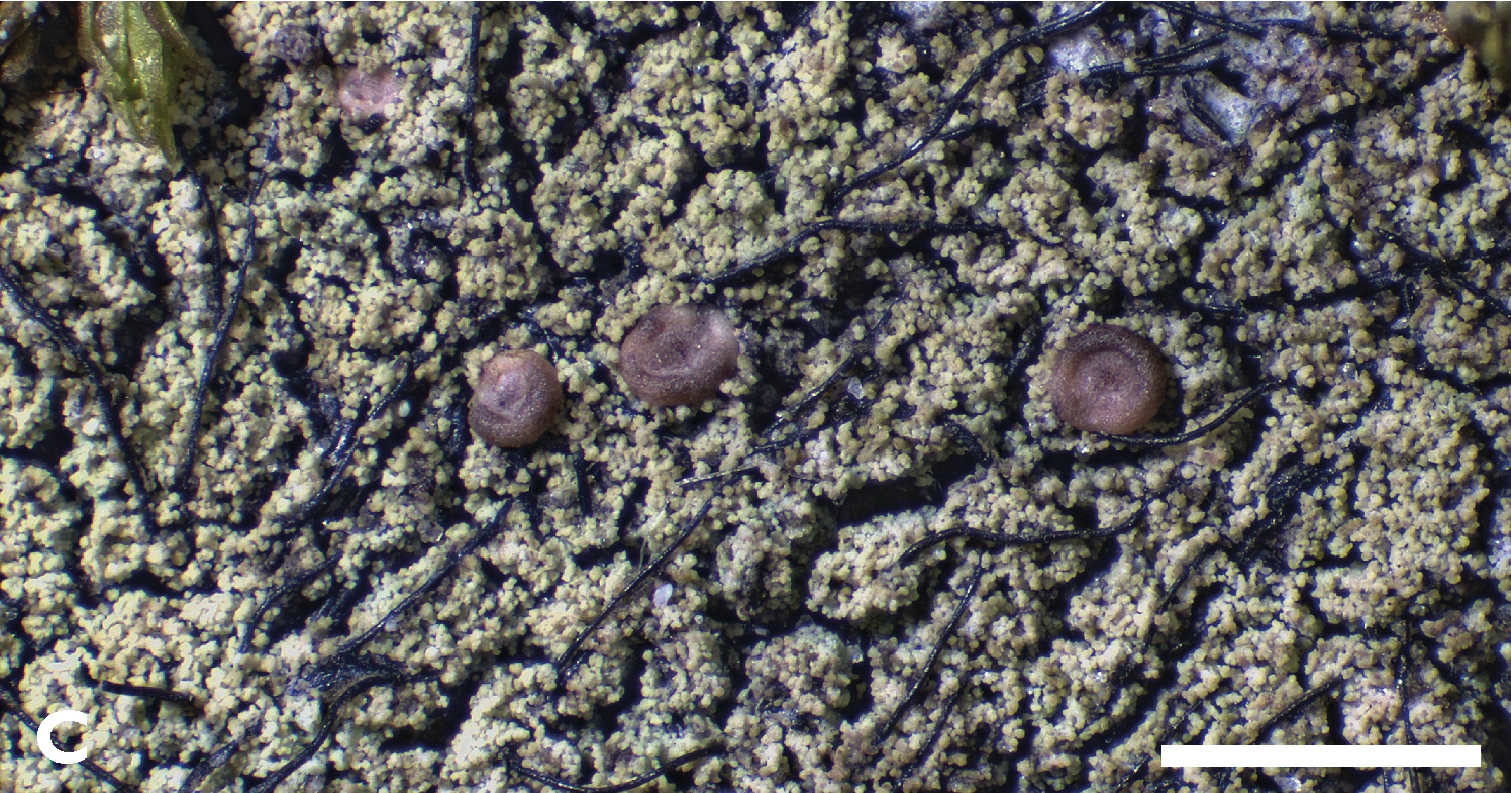
- close-up of thallus with apothecia; scale bar: 1 mm

Scientific classification
- Domain: Eukaryota
- Kingdom: Fungi
- Division: Ascomycota
- Class: Lecanoromycetes
- Order: Lecanorales
- Family: Ramalinaceae
- Genus: Bacidina
- Species: B. adastra

Binomial name
- Bacidina adastra (Sparrius & Aptroot) M.Hauck & V.Wirth (2010)

Synonyms
- Bacidia adastra Sparrius & Aptroot (2003)

= Bacidina adastra =

Species of lichen

Bacidina adastra is a species of corticolous (bark-dwelling) leprose lichen in the family Ramalinaceae. The lichen has a distinctive thick, powdery, bright yellowish-green thallus, forming patches up to half a metre in diameter. First described in 2003 from the Netherlands, it has since been documented throughout Western and Eastern Europe in countries including Belgium, England, Germany, Poland, Russia, and Sweden. The lichen primarily grows on tree bark, especially on nutrient-enriched bases of trees like poplar, willow, and elm, though it can occasionally be found on wood, soil, and rock. Its fruiting bodies (apothecia) appear rarely and vary in colour from pale pink to dark blue-black. The species is sometimes confused with free-living green algae or similar lichens, particularly Bacidina neosquamulosa, but can be distinguished by its granular growth pattern and microscopic features.

== Taxonomy ==
Bacidina adastra was first formally described by Laurens Sparrius and André Aptroot in 2003 as a member of the genus Bacidia. The species was discovered in the Netherlands, with subsequent observations in Belgium, England, and Germany. The type specimen (holotype) was collected on 9 February 2001, by Sparrius (collection number 4566) from a fallen branch of Salix alba in a landscape garden called 'Heemtuin Goudse Hout' in Gouda, South Holland, Netherlands. The holotype is preserved at the Leiden herbarium (L). The species epithet adastra references the motto on the coat of arms of Gouda (Latin – 'through the thorns to the stars'), alluding to the vivid colour of the thallus despite growing in humble habitats. The German name for the lichen is Algen-Stäbchenflechte ('algal rod lichen').

The species was originally classified within Bacidia despite its ascus structure because of the unclear taxonomic status of similar genera such as Bacidina, Lichingoldia, and Woessia (the latter two have since been synonymized with Bacidia). Hauck and Wirth transferred it to the genus Bacidina in 2010, as part of a broader effort to standardize the taxonomic treatment of morphologically similar species. Their rationale was based on several consistent features that distinguish Bacidina from Bacidia, including the frequent occurrence of goniocysts (never formed by Bacidia), slight pigmentation of apothecia, differences in excipulum structure, lack of crystals in the cortex, and the absence of lichen substances. Additionally, molecular phylogenetic studies using nuclear ITS ribosomal DNA sequences had confirmed the separation of Bacidina from Bacidia and supported the genus-level distinction based on both morphological features and characteristic ecological traits.

Molecular phylogenetic analyses using ITS rDNA sequences have supported the placement of Bacidina adastra within Bacidina, which forms a monophyletic clade. A 2012 study by Czarnota and Guzow-Krzemińska sequenced the ITS rDNA region of B. adastra (GenBank accession number JN972442) and revealed that its closest relative is B. inundata, with this relationship being strongly supported in multiple analytical methods. Their phylogenetic trees clearly showed B. adastra and B. inundata forming a distinct clade within the broader Bacidina group. A 2018 study by the same authors further investigated phylogenetic relationships among Bacidina species, confirming the status of B. adastra as a distinct species. This research also revealed instances of taxonomic confusion, with some specimens initially identified as B. adastra reassigned to other species based on molecular evidence. A phylogenetic 2020 study that included B. adastra in the analysis showed a close relationship to Bacidina caligans.

== Description ==
Bacidina adastra is a crustose lichen characterized by its distinctive thallus (the main body of the lichen) that often forms extensive patches up to 0.5 metres in diameter. The thallus is thick and leprose (powdery), typically consisting of a cracked layer of soredia (specialized reproductive structures) up to 1 mm thick. When fresh, the thallus displays a vivid yellowish-green colour that resembles free-living green algae. When dried or in herbarium specimens, it tends to turn greenish-grey or brownish-grey. The individual soredia measure 30–50 μm in diameter. The photobiont (the algal partner in the lichen symbiosis) consists of chlorococcoid cells measuring 7–14 μm in diameter.

Morphologically, B. adastra resembles B. neosquamulosa, a species complex that may include multiple distinct species. B. neosquamulosa in the strict sense forms imbricate, finely dissected microsquamules that may later disintegrate to form goniocysts. B. adastra, on the other hand, starts out as minute, somewhat flattened, granules that soon bud off new granules in a more or less coralloid manner, resulting in a thick, finely granular and pale green crust. In addition, the thallus surface tends to be more shiny in B. neosquamulosa than in B. adastra.

Apothecia (fruiting bodies) are rarely present in Bacidina adastra. When they do appear, they are sessile (attached directly to the surface without a stalk), constricted at the base, and measure (0.2-)0.4–0.7 mm in diameter. The disc of the apothecium ranges from flat to flexuose (wavy) and varies in colour from pale pink to dark blue-black, often with only partially coloured sections. The darkened areas show an aeruginose (blue-green) pigmentation when examined in cross-section. The apothecial margin is conspicuous, measuring 0.1–0.2 mm wide, sitting flush with the disc, and appearing pinkish with aeruginose or dark brown flecks. The base of the apothecium is hyaline (colourless and transparent).

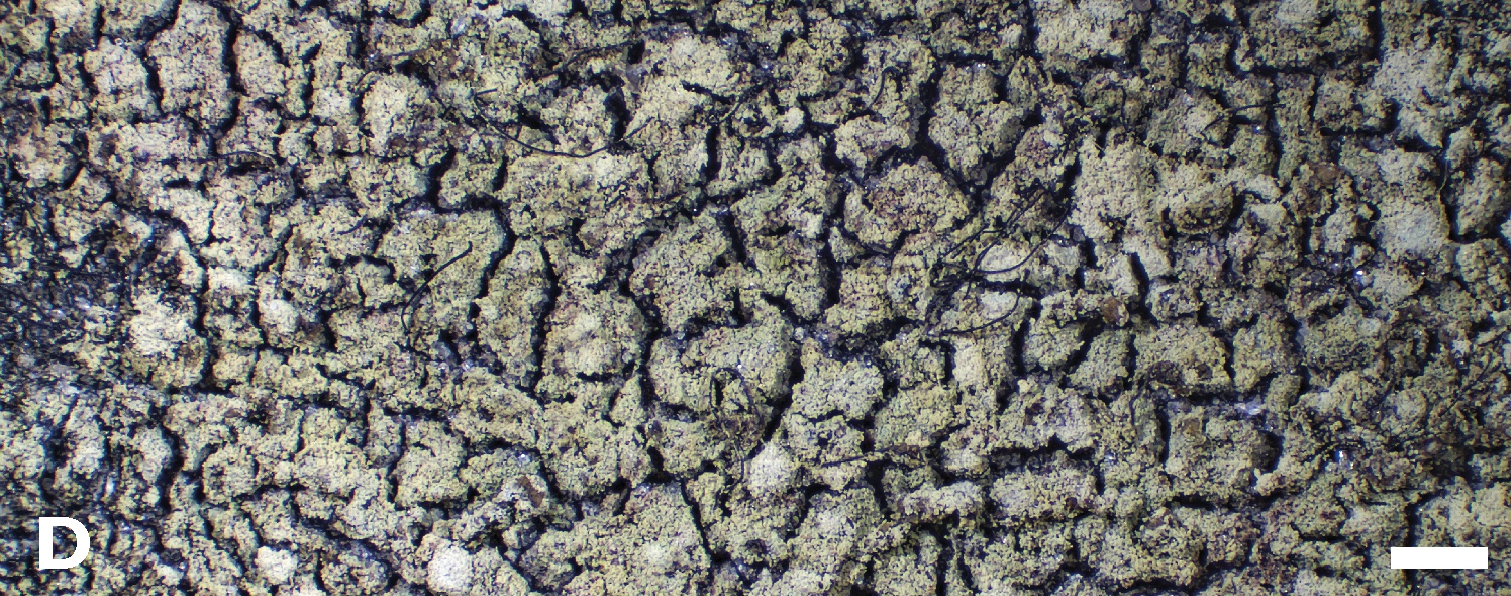
Overview of thick, sterile thallus; Scale bar: 1 mm

The internal structure includes a well-developed excipulum (the outer tissue of the apothecium) that is paraplectenchymatous (composed of cells with similar dimensions in all directions), 25–35 μm wide. The hyphae within have cell cavities (lumina) that are approximately isodiametric to slightly ellipsoid, measuring 5–7 by 5–10 μm. These are primarily hyaline but may be partially aeruginose or orange-brown, especially in the upper part bordering the epithecium (the uppermost layer of the apothecium). The epithecium itself ranges from hyaline to aeruginose or orange-brown, about 5–10 μm thick.

The hymenium contains numerous paraphyses (sterile filaments) about 1 μm thick with tips widened to 5 μm, and clavate (club-shaped) asci. Each ascus contains 8 spores that are acicular (needle-shaped), 3–10 septate (divided by cross-walls), hyaline, and measure 40–50 by 0.9–1.2 μm, appearing straight to slightly curved.

The species occasionally produces conidiomata (asexual reproductive structures), which are white, immersed, and about 0.1 mm in diameter. The conidia (asexual spores) are filiform (thread-like), measuring 35–50 by 1.0–1.2 μm, with 4–6 indistinct septa. Chemical analysis shows no distinctive spot reactions, and no lichen substances were detected by thin-layer chromatography.

=== Similar species ===
Bacidina adastra shares several characteristics with other lichens in the Bacidia/Bacidina complex. It differs from B. viridescens by having a sorediate-leprose thallus rather than granular-areolate and by lacking purple pigment in the excipulum. It can be differentiated from B. caligans by its longer conidia (35–50 μm versus 25–35 μm), thicker thallus, and absence of reddish-brown K+ (purplish) pigment in the excipulum. It differs from B. neosquamulosa by having a thicker leprose thallus rather than subsquamulose granules.

Bacidina etayana (formerly Bacidia etayana) is perhaps the most closely related species with which B. adastra might be confused. Both species possess a sorediate green thallus, similarly colored apothecia with hyaline hymenium and hypothecium, and an apothecium margin darker than the disc that turns blackish with age. However, they can be reliably distinguished by several morphological features. B. etayana has significantly smaller apothecia (0.1–0.26 mm compared to 0.4–0.7 mm in B. adastra), a shorter hymenium (25–40 μm versus 60–70 μm), and smaller spores (25–37 μm versus 40–50 μm). The thallus structure also differs noticeably: B. etayana forms dissolving goniocysts with smooth to slightly mamillate surfaces that allow chloroplasts to be clearly visible under microscopic examination, whereas B. adastra has soredia covered by numerous protuberant hyphae that render the chloroplasts only indistinctly visible through the translucent surface.

Bacidina adastra can also be differentiated from B. phacodes by its sorediose to thickly leprose thallus (versus thin to irregularly warted in B. phacodes), its variously coloured and often piebald apothecia (versus consistently pale pink or flesh-coloured), and its partially pigmented excipulum (versus consistently colourless). The excipulum of B. adastra is distinctly paraplectenchymatous with isodiametric lumina measuring 5–10 μm, a feature that differs from the prosoplectenchymatous excipulum structure seen in several related species.

== Habitat and distribution ==
Bacidina adastra has been documented in several Western European countries, including the Netherlands, Belgium, England, and Germany. Within the Netherlands, the species has been reported to be fairly common, with numerous putative specimens collected across different provinces including Drenthe, Noord-Holland, Overijssel, and Zuid-Holland. The first documented record of the species from eastern Europe was in Poland; it was later reported from Russia, Armenia, and Estonia. In Fennoscandia, it was first reported from Sweden in 2017, specifically from two sites in southern Skåne. Bacidina adastra is considered rare and strongly over-reported, as it is often confused with crusts of free-living green algae.

The species occupies a variety of substrates, though it is primarily corticolous (growing on bark). It shows a preference for hypertrophicated (nutrient-enriched) bases of trees with neutral to basic bark, such as Populus (poplar), Salix (willow), and Ulmus (elm). It also colonizes trees with neutral to slightly acidic bark, including Frangula alnus (alder buckthorn) and Quercus robur (pedunculate oak). While primarily found on living trees, lignicolous (growing on wood), terricolous (growing on soil), and saxicolous (growing on rock) collections have also been documented. The lichen typically grows in partially shaded habitats.

In Sweden, it has been found in two ecologically distinct sites. The first find was made in a churchyard surrounded by houses in an otherwise open, agricultural landscape, where it occurred in fair quantity and sparingly fertile on a young, planted Ulmus. The second find was made in the northern outskirts of the town of Lund, in public plantations with a variety of shrubs where the ground had been covered by a black fabric of non-woven polypropylene to prevent weeds from establishing. This fabric was colonized by a variety of lichens, with Bacidina adastra being most abundant on moderately shaded slopes. At this site, other lichens growing with B. adastra included Agonimia globulifera, Bacidina chloroticula, and Peltigera didactyla.

The species has been observed as a host for the lichenicolous fungus Paranectria oropensis, suggesting a specific ecological relationship between these organisms. This parasitic association has been noted repeatedly, with P. oropensis showing an apparent preferential relationship with B. adastra.
