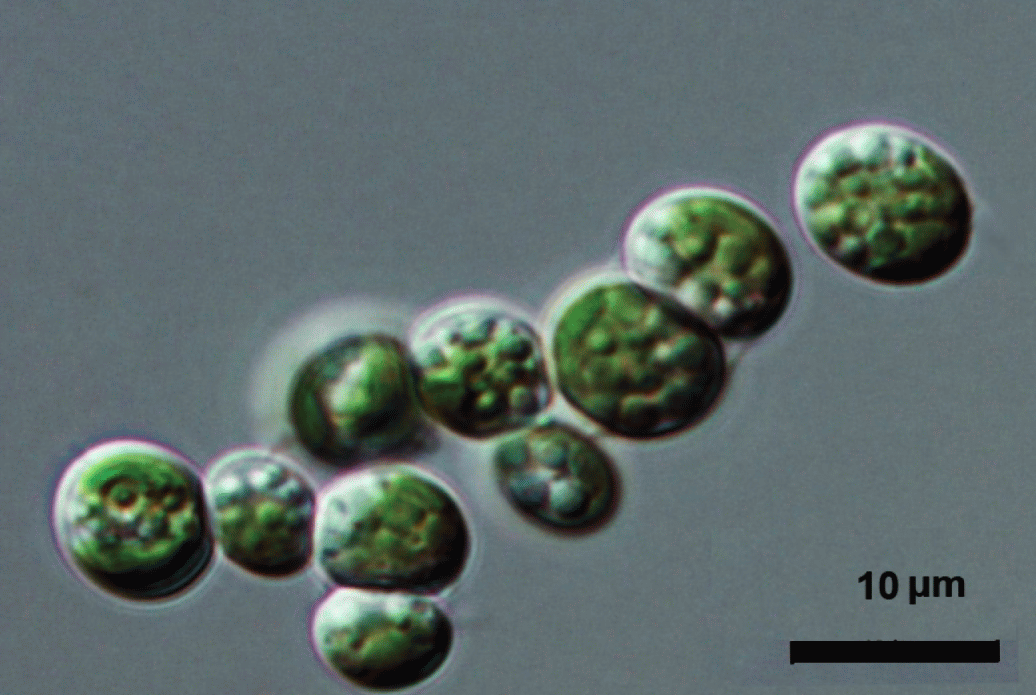

Scientific classification
- Kingdom: Plantae
- Division: Chlorophyta
- Class: Trebouxiophyceae
- Order: incertae sedis
- Family: incertae sedis
- Genus: Elliptochloris
- Species: E. bilobata

Binomial name
- Elliptochloris bilobata Tscherm.-Woess, 1980

= Elliptochloris bilobata =

Species of green alga

Elliptochloris bilobata is a species of green alga in the order Prasiolales. First described in 1980, it is the type species of the genus Elliptochloris. The microscopic alga has distinctive ellipsoid cells containing a unique bilobed chloroplast, and reproduces both through autospores and rod-shaped spores. Though originally discovered as a photobiont within the lichen Catolechia wahlenbergii in the Austrian Alps, it has since been found living freely across Europe, Israel, and Antarctica. The species grows on various surfaces including soil, rock, and tree bark, and is known for its ability to grow in both natural and human-modified environments.

== Taxonomy ==
Elliptochloris bilobata was first formally described by Elisabeth Tschermak-Woess in 1980. The discovery began when Josef Hafellner collected lichen specimens in July 1978 from Knotenberg mountain, Austria. Tschermak-Woess then worked to isolate the algal component from these lichen fragments, initially facing several challenges. After multiple attempts, she successfully established six clonal cultures, allowing for detailed study of the organism.

The discovery represented not only a new species but also a new genus, as the organism's unique characteristics set it apart from all known green algae at the time. The species was particularly significant to algal taxonomy because it challenged the traditional classification of Chlorococcales, which were typically divided into groups based on whether they reproduced via autospores or zoospores – E. bilobata exhibited characteristics that bridged these categories. It is the type species of the genus Elliptochloris. The species name bilobata comes from Latin, meaning "with two lobes" or "bilobed".

The type specimen was collected from Knotenberg in the Kreuzeck mountain range, Carinthia, Austria, where it was found living as a phycobiont (algal symbiont) in the lichen Catolechia wahlenbergii. The authentic strain SAG 245.80, which is cryopreserved in a metabolically inactive state, was later designated as the epitype by Darienko and Pröschold in 2016. Type specimens are preserved at both the University of Graz (GZU) and the University of Vienna (WU) herbaria.

== Description ==
Elliptochloris bilobata is a microscopic green alga with distinctive cellular features. The cells are typically ellipsoid in form, though they can sometimes be spherical. Individual cells measure up to 13 μm in length and 10.5 μm in width, about the size of a small human red blood cell.

The most distinctive feature of the species is its unique chloroplast (the cell's photosynthetic structure), which is divided into two lobes connected by a narrow bridge. This bilobed chloroplast has a trough-like or cup-like shape and typically lies against the cell wall, leaving part of the cell's interior space free. The cell's nucleus is typically positioned near the base of this trough-shaped chloroplast. Unlike many related algae, E. bilobata lacks pyrenoids (protein bodies typically involved in carbon fixation), but stores starch in very small, flat granules. The cell's cytoplasm (internal cellular fluid) has a characteristic honeycomb-like or alveolar appearance, containing numerous small vacuoles that give it a spongy texture and small droplets of oil. The cell is enclosed by a thin but firm cell wall.

When dividing, the cell follows a precise sequence: the chloroplast splits first at its bridge-like connection, followed by the division of the nucleus and finally the cell itself. The species employs two distinct reproductive strategies. The first method involves producing autospores, which are daughter cells that closely resemble the parent cell in shape and structure, typically forming two to four new cells. The second method produces much smaller rod-shaped spores, with a single parent cell giving rise to either 16 or 32 tiny rod-like cells measuring between 2 and 8.5 micrometres in length. These rod-shaped spores eventually grow and develop into the typical ellipsoid form of mature cells.

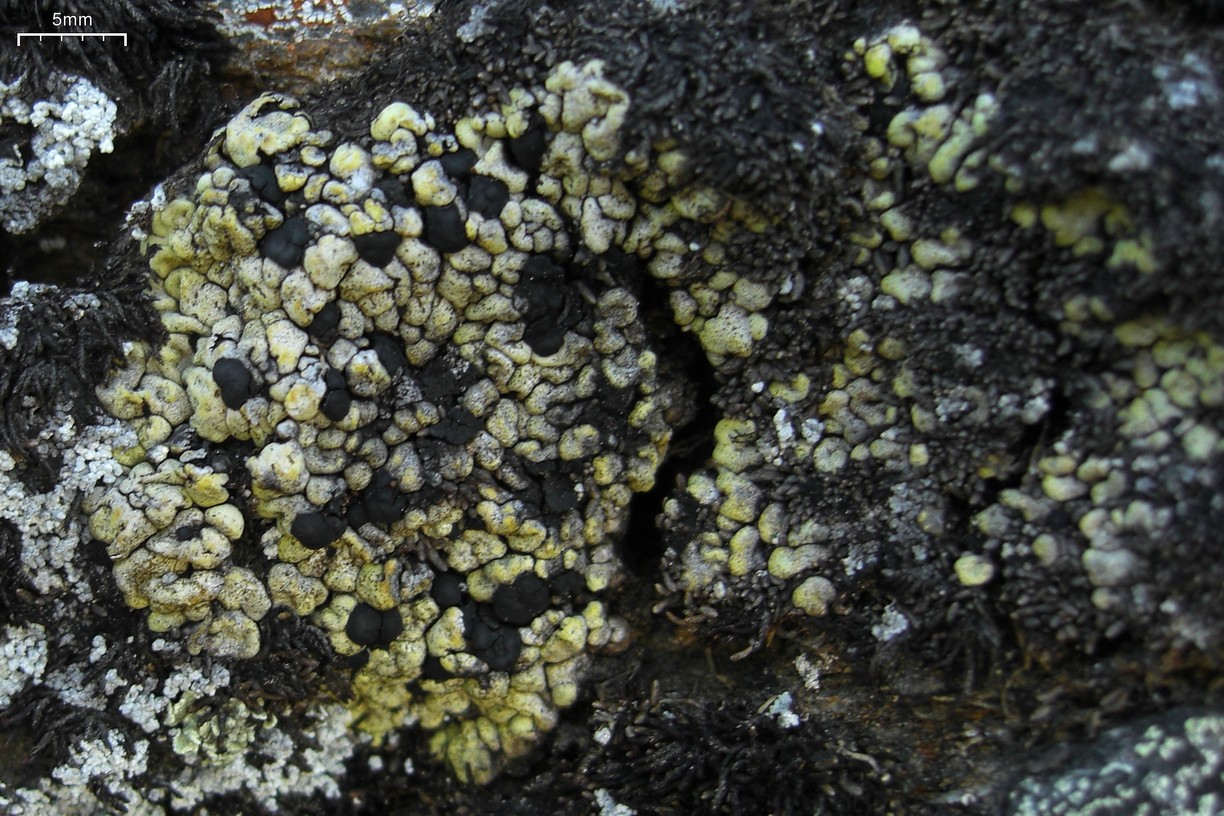
Elliptochloris bilobata is the photobiont partner of the lichen Catolechia wahlenbergii, shown here.

This alga was first discovered living symbiotically as a photobiont within the lichen Catolechia wahlenbergii, where it provides energy through photosynthesis to support the fungal partner. The species has been successfully grown in laboratory cultures, where it forms pale green colonies that can have a somewhat watery-mucilaginous texture. In laboratory settings, it grows best at pH 5 and can be cultivated under alternating cycles of light and dark (16 hours of light followed by 8 hours of darkness) at temperatures between 17–21°C.

== Distribution, habitat, and ecology ==
Elliptochloris bilobata was first discovered in the Austrian Alps, where it was found living symbiotically within the lichen Catolechia wahlenbergii. The type locality is Knotenberg mountain in the Kreuzeck range, Carinthia, Austria, at an elevation of approximately 2,200 metres above sea level. Since its initial discovery, the species has been reported across Europe, including in Bulgaria, the Czech Republic, Russia, Ukraine, and the Ural Mountains. Outside Europe, it has been found in Israel and Antarctica.

The species inhabits a wide range of environments, being particularly common in forest soils and tundra regions. While it has been documented in various climatic zones, including Antarctic environments, it is absent from desert habitats.

The alga grows on diverse substrates, including granite outcrops, tree bark, and in caves. On granite surfaces, it can form visible macroscopic growths and often becomes the dominant algal species.

Elliptochloris bilobata demonstrates considerable adaptability to human-modified environments, showing tolerance to various forms of air pollution. This environmental flexibility, combined with its ability to form lichen symbioses while also surviving independently, makes it one of the more successful species in both natural and anthropogenically altered habitats.
