= Linkenholt =

Village and parish in Hampshire, England

Coordinates: 51.320°N 1.478°W

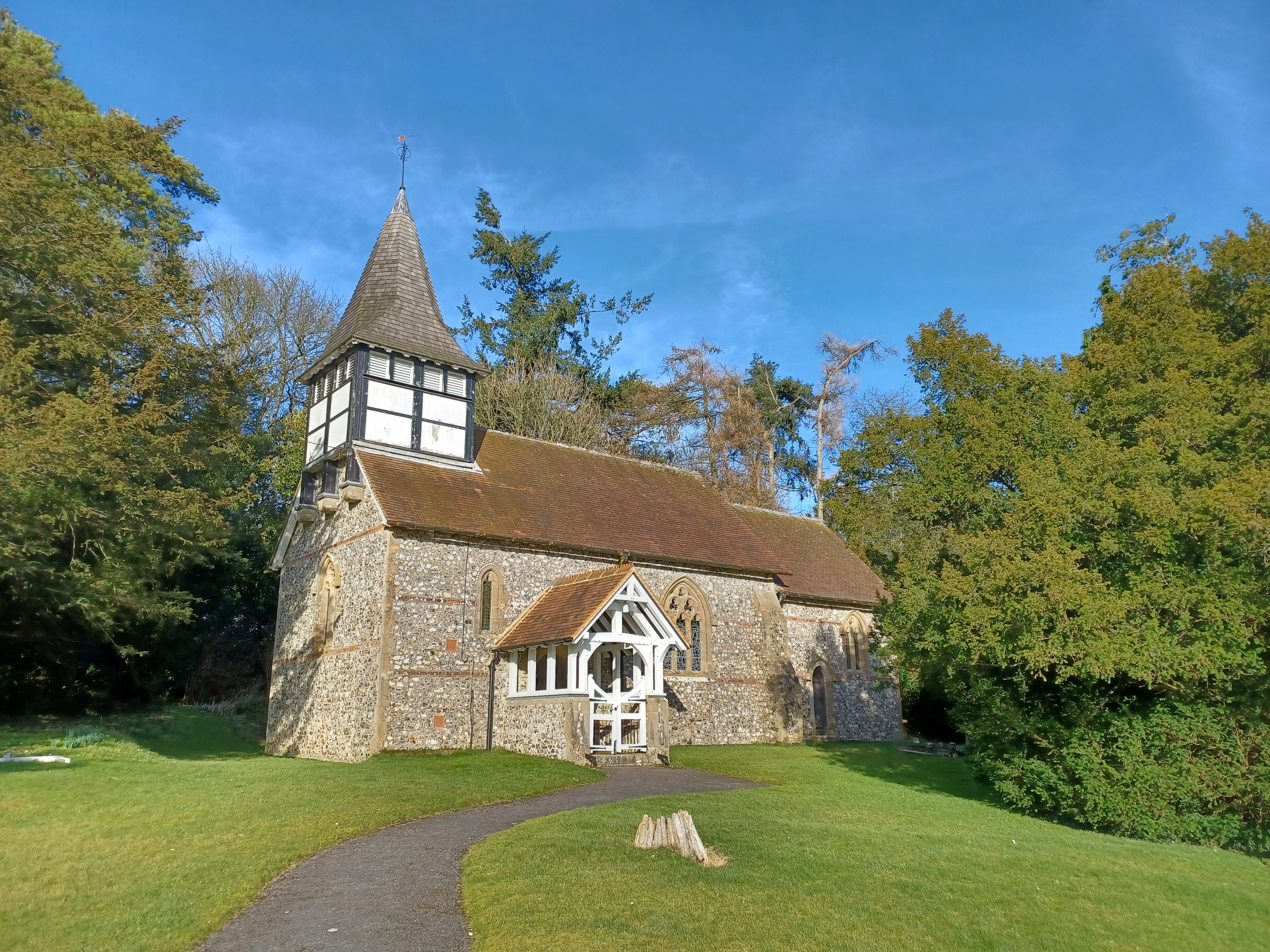
- St. Peter's parish church

- Location within Hampshire
- OS grid reference: SU365585
- District: Test Valley
- Shire county: Hampshire
- Region: South East
- Country: England
- Sovereign state: United Kingdom
- Post town: Andover
- Postcode district: SP11
- Police: Hampshire and Isle of Wight
- Fire: Hampshire and Isle of Wight
- Ambulance: South Central
- UK Parliament: North West Hampshire

Linkenholt is a village near Andover in Hampshire, England with about 40 inhabitants. It is in the civil Parish of Faccombe.

== Geography ==
The village is in an area of outstanding natural beauty. Linkenholt includes a 2,003-acre (811 ha) estate that has an Edwardian manor house, 21 cottages and houses, 1,500 acres (610 ha) of farmland, 450 acres (180 ha) of woodland, a village shop and a blacksmith's forge. The Church of England parish church of Saint Peter is not part of the estate.

== History ==
The history of the Manor of Linkenholt traces back beyond Domesday Book of 1086. From the reign of Edward the Confessor (1042–66) until after the Dissolution in the mid-1500s, the Manor of Linkenholt was granted by successive monarchs to the abbot and convent of St Peter, Gloucester. The Domesday Book records it as Linchehou, when it was part of the land of the Abbey of St Peter of Gloucester.

In 1629, the estate was bought by Emanuel Badd for 2,000 pounds and was sold in 1680 to Amsterdam merchant Robert Styles for 12,000 pounds. The estate remained in the same family until the early 19th century. Roland Dudley bought it in the 1920s.

Herbert Blagrave bought the estate in 1964 and it passed to the trustees of the Herbert and Peter Blagrave Charitable Trust on his death in 1981. The trustees sold the estate for an estimated £25 million in May 2009 to Swedish businessman Stefan Persson. All of the buildings in the village are rented to tenants.

== Geography ==
Linkenholt has a site of Special Scientific Interest (SSSI) just to the north west of the village, called Combe Wood and Linkenholt Hanging.
