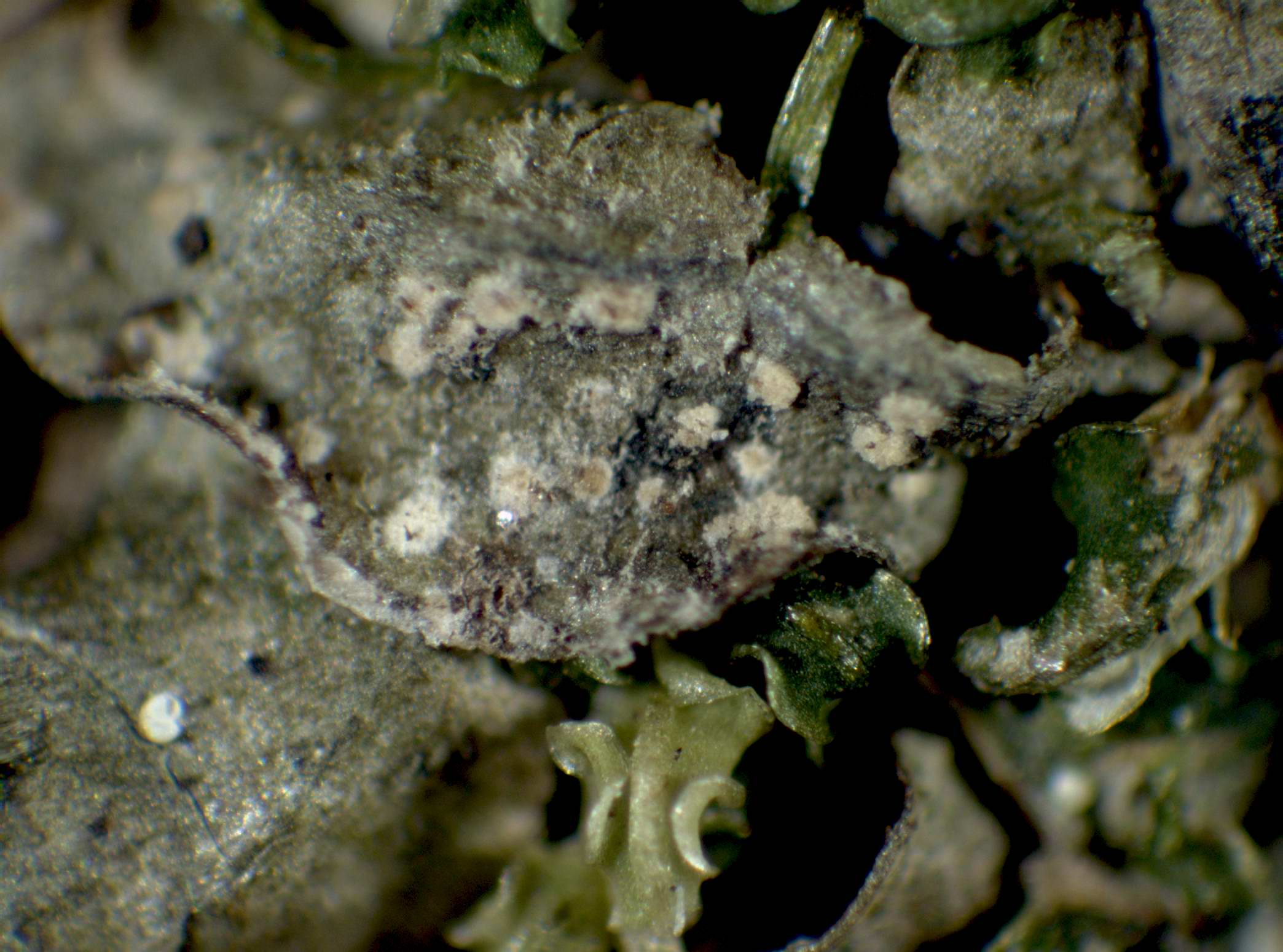
- Vezdaea retigera

Scientific classification
- Kingdom: Fungi
- Division: Ascomycota
- Subdivision: Pezizomycotina
- Order: Vezdaeales; Lumbsch & Lücking (2016)
- Family: Vezdaeaceae; Poelt & Vězda ex J.C.David & D.Hawksw. (1991)
- Genus: Vezdaea; Tscherm.-Woess & Poelt (1976)

Type species
- Vezdaea aestivalis (Ohlert) Tscherm.-Woess & Poelt (1976)

Synonyms
- Vezdaea Poelt & Döbbeler (1975)

= Vezdaea =

Genus of lichen-forming fungi

Vezdaea is a genus of crustose lichens in the monotypic family Vezdaeaceae, which itself is the only taxon in the order Vezdaeales. The genus was established in 1976 and named after the Czech lichenologist Antonín Vězda for his contributions to lichen science. These lichens form extremely thin crusts that appear as dustings of tiny greenish to grey particles on decaying moss, plant debris, and soil, particularly in metal-enriched environments that other lichens avoid. The genus contains 14 species.

== Taxonomy ==
The genus was circumscribed by Elisabeth Tschermak-Woess and Josef Poelt in 1976. The genus name honours the Czech lichenologist Antonín Vězda (1920–2008).

The family name Vezdaeaceae was originally proposed by Poelt and Vězda in 1981; the proposal, however, did not meet the formal requirements of the International Code of Nomenclature: Poelt and Vězda omitted a Latin (or otherwise Code-compliant) description and did not designate the type genus, so under Articles 32.1(c) and 36.1 the name was not validly published. The family was later publisher validly by John Charles David and David Hawksworth in 1991. The order Vezdaeales was published by H. Thorsten Lumbsch and Robert Lücking in 2016 to accommodate the isolate family Vezdaeaceae and its single genus.

== Description ==
Vezdaea forms an extremely thin crust that appears as a dusting of minute, grain-like greenish to grey particles on its chosen substrate. Each particle is a goniocyst—a tight ball of algal cells wrapped in a thin fungal jacket—which gives the thallus a powdery look rather than a continuous skin. Colonies may begin hidden under the surface layers of decaying leaves, moss tissue or even beneath the cortex of other lichens, but they usually break through and develop on the surface as they mature. The photosynthetic partner is from the filamentous green algal genus Leptosira. No specialised vegetative propagules (such as soredia or isidia) have been recorded, and thin-layer chromatography has failed to detect any characteristic lichen products.

The sexual structures are tiny half-sphere to top-shaped apothecia that remain almost invisible when dry in most species. They lack both a true outer wall (exciple) and the supporting tissue (hypothecium) found in many lichens, leaving the spore-bearing layer (hymenium) exposed once the apothecia swell with moisture. That layer is threaded with branched paraphyses which can clasp and intertwine around the spore sacs (asci) if well developed. The asci themselves resemble those of genus Pertusaria: eight-spored, cylindrical, with thick walls and a strongly blue staining reaction to potassium iodide except for a tiny apical pore. Their colourless ascospores vary from simple one-celled bodies to multi-septate forms, and may have smooth or slightly warted surfaces. Asexual reproduction is poorly understood; conventional pycnidia have not been seen, but some hyphae bear conidiogenous cells that bud off colourless, rod-shaped spores.

== Ecology ==
Species of Vezdaea live chiefly on the ground, spreading across thin biological films that coat soil and plant debris. They are especially common on dying or decaying mats of mosses and other bryophytes, on the remains of older lichens, and on assorted microbial biofilms. Field records show a preference for soils enriched with metals—a harsh microhabitat that many competing lichens avoid—while occurrences on tree bark are uncommon. Species of Vezdaea are also regarded as ephemeral lichens with short life cycles, adapted to disturbed or otherwise dynamic substrata where competition from other lichens is limited.

== Species ==
As of June 2025, Species Fungorum (in the Catalogue of Life) accepts 15 species of Vezdaea.

- Vezdaea acicularis Coppins (1987)
- Vezdaea aestivalis (Ohlert) Tscherm.-Woess & Poelt (1976)
- Vezdaea cobria Giralt, Poelt & Suanjak (1993)
- Vezdaea dawsoniae Döbbeler (1979)
- Vezdaea flava Aptroot & Sparrius (2003)
- Vezdaea foliicola Sérus. (1979)
- Vezdaea leprosa (P.James) Vězda (1977)
- Vezdaea obscura Döbbeler (1981)
- Vezdaea poeltiana S.Y.Kondr., Lőkös, J.P.Halda & Hur (2017)
- Vezdaea polyspora Kalb & Vězda (1992)
- Vezdaea retigera Poelt & Döbbeler (1977)
- Vezdaea rheocarpa Poelt & Döbbeler (1977)
- Vezdaea schuyleriana Lendemer (2011)
- Vezdaea stipitata Poelt & Döbbeler (1977)
