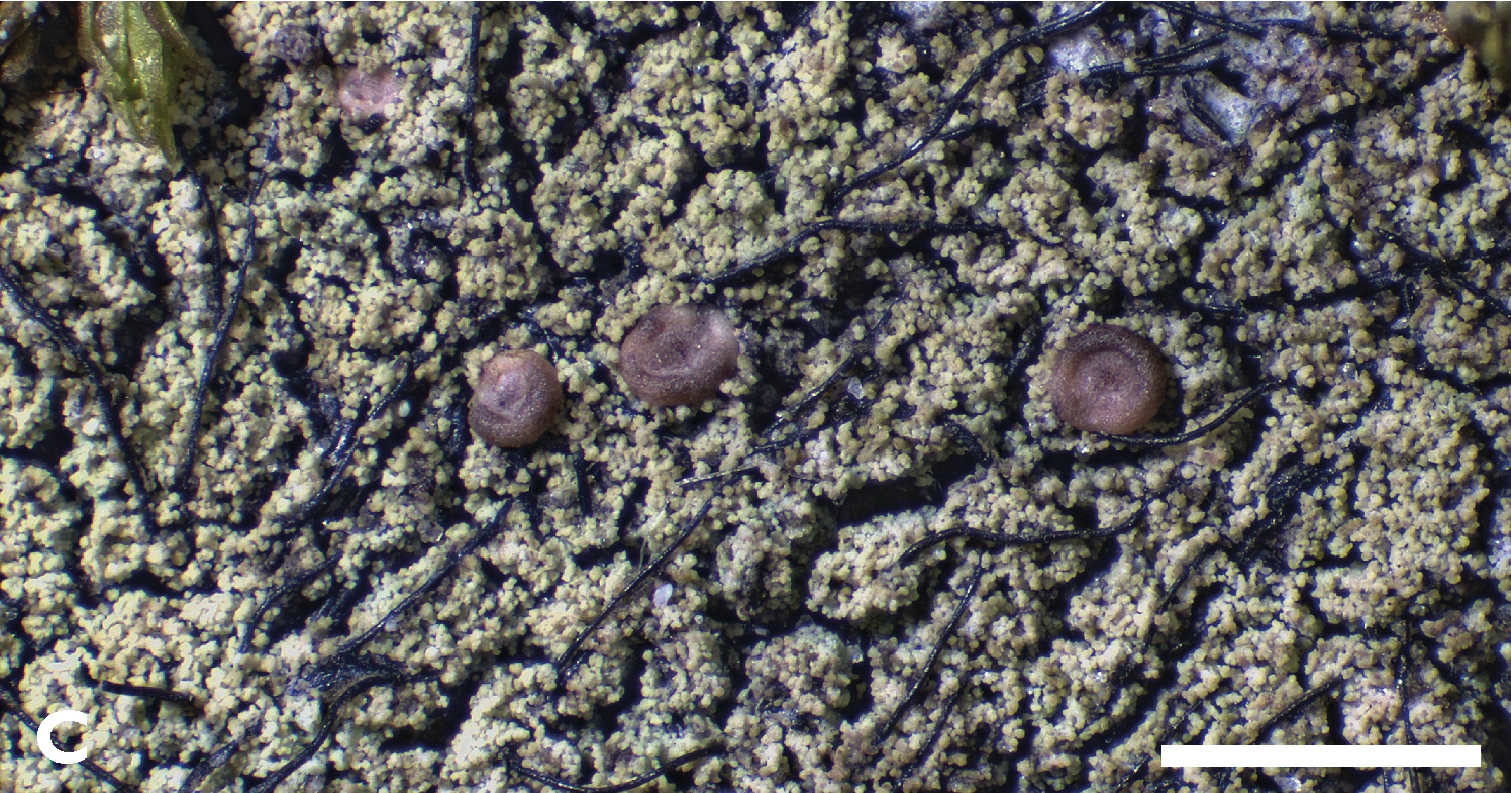
- Woessia adastra; scale bar: 1 mm

Scientific classification
- Kingdom: Fungi
- Division: Ascomycota
- Class: Lecanoromycetes
- Order: Lecanorales
- Family: Ramalinaceae
- Genus: Woessia; D.Hawksw. & Poelt (1986)

Type species
- Woessia fusarioides D.Hawksw., Poelt & Tscherm.-Woess (1986)

= Woessia =

Genus of lichen-forming fungi

Woessia is a genus of lichen‑forming fungi in the family Ramalinaceae. The genus was originally proposed in 1986 but was subsumed into other genera until molecular studies in 2025 demonstrated it represents a distinct evolutionary lineage. Species of Woessia are small bark-dwelling lichens found mainly in Europe, distinguished by their needle-shaped ascospores.

== Taxonomy ==
The genus was introduced for an anamorphic, Bacidia‑like lichen by David Hawksworth and Josef Poelt in 1986, with W. fusarioides as type species. It later fell out of use when Bacidina was conserved over the earlier names Lichingoldia and Woessia under the one fungus, one name policy. Molecular work subsequently showed that Bacidia sensu lato resolves into three distinct clades—Bacidia (in the strict sense), Bacidina, and Woessia—and in 2025 van den Boom and Alvarado formally resurrected Woessia, making seven new combinations and treating W. fusarioides as a synonym of W. modesta.

Multi‑locus phylogenetic analyses recovered Woessia as a well‑supported clade separate from Bacidia and Bacidina. On that basis van den Boom and Alvarado (2025) reinstated Woessia within Ramalinaceae and transferred several Bacidia/Bacidina‑segregates to the genus. They also noted that the type species of Woessia, W. fusarioides, is the same taxon as Bacidina modesta, so the accepted name for the type species becomes Woessia modesta.

== Description ==
The genus comprises small, bark-inhabiting (corticolous) crustose lichens with thin, often granular to microsquamulose thalli and biatorine apothecia lacking a thalline margin. The hymenium is amyloid (I+ blue) and asci are of the Bacidia type, producing hyaline, multi-septate, narrowly needle-like (acicular) to threadlike (filiform) ascospores; pycnidia (when present) are small and dark. Chemistry is sparse or absent in routine spot tests.

== Species ==
The following species are accepted in Woessia sensu the 2025 resurrection:

- Woessia adastra (Sparrius & Aptroot) van den Boom & P.Alvarado (2025)
- Woessia brandii (Coppins & van den Boom) van den Boom & P.Alvarado (2025)
- Woessia egenula (Nyl.) van den Boom & P.Alvarado (2025)
- Woessia modesta (Zwackh ex Vain.) van den Boom & P.Alvarado (2025)
- Woessia neosquamulosa (Aptroot & Herk) van den Boom & P.Alvarado (2025)
- Woessia saxenii (Erichsen) van den Boom & P.Alvarado (2025)
- Woessia terricola (van den Boom & P.Alvarado) van den Boom & P.Alvarado (2025)
