= Combe Wood and Linkenholt Hanging =

Protected area in Berkshire, England

- Site of Special Scientific Interest
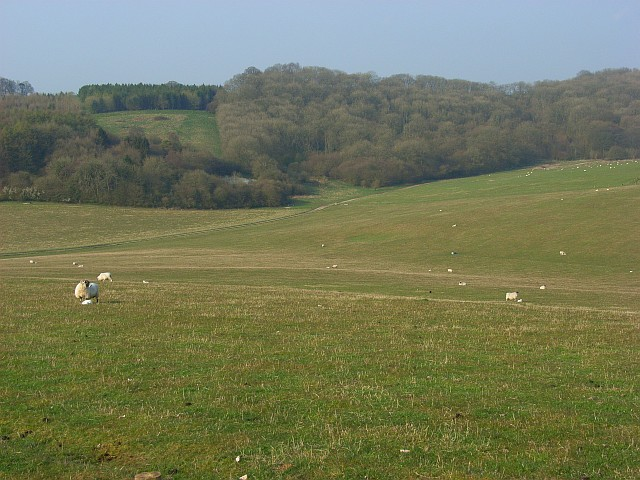

- Location within Berkshire
- Location of Combe Wood and Linkenholt Hanging.
- Area of search: Berkshire
- Grid reference: SU 357 595
- Coordinates: 51.333°N 1.489°W
- Interest: Biological
- Area: 106.5 hectares (263 acres)
- Notification date: 1987
- Location map: Magic Map

Combe Wood and Linkenholt Hanging is a 106.5-hectare (263-acre) biological Site of Special Scientific Interest south of Hungerford in Berkshire. It is in the North Wessex Downs, which is an Area of Outstanding Natural Beauty.

Most of this site is semi-natural woodland on rendzina (humus-rich and shallow) soils. There are also areas of woods on chalk and acid soils, together with some chalk grassland and scrub. The woods have many fallow deer and birds while the grassland has a rich chalk flora and a variety of insects.

== Fauna ==
The site has the following animals:

=== Mammals ===
- Fallow deer
- Roe deer
- Muntjac deer
- Fox
- Hare
- Rabbit

=== Birds ===
- Nuthatch

=== Invertebrates ===
- Pyrochroa coccinea
- Malthodes fibulatus
- Malthodes maurus
- Malthodes mysticus
- Volucella pellucens
- Neoitamus cyanura
- Speckled wood
- Limenitis camilla
- Purple hairstreak
- Platycheirus scutatus
- Pyrausta nigrata
- Tetrix undulata
- Melanargia galathea
- Dark green fritillary
- Hummingbird hawk-moth

== Flora ==
The site has the following flora:

=== Trees ===
- Birch
- Fraxinus
- Acer campestre
- Quercus robur
- Ulmus glabra
- Beech
- Whitebeam
- Hazel

=== Plants ===
- Pteridium aquilinum
- Chamerion angustifolium
- Hyacinthoides non-scripta
- Mercurialis perennis
- Euphorbia amygdaloides
- Polygonatum multiflorum
- Anemone nemorosa
- Orchis mascula
- Myosotis sylvatica
- Lathraea squamaria
- Paris quadrifolia
- Galium odoratum
- Gentianella amarella
- Saxifraga granulata
- Campanula glomerata
- Dactylorhiza fuchsii
- Crataegus monogyna
- Cornus sanguinea
- Ligustrum vulgare
- Geum urbanum
- Helianthemum nummularium

=== Lichens ===
- Bacidia biatorina
- Bacidia atropurpurea
- Opegrapha ochrocheila
- Pertusaria hemisphaerica
- Thelotrema lepadinum
- Strangospora ochrophora
- Peltigera horizontalis

=== Mosses ===
- Orthotrichum lyellii
- Zygodon baumgartneri
- Leucodon sciuroides
- Neckera pumila
- Heterocladium heteropterum

== Access ==
The site is crossed by public footpaths.
