= Bacidia kurilensis =

Scientific classification
- Domain: Eukaryota
- Kingdom: Fungi
- Division: Ascomycota
- Class: Lecanoromycetes
- Order: Lecanorales
- Family: Ramalinaceae
- Genus: Bacidia
- Species: B. kurilensis

Binomial name
- Bacidia kurilensis Gerasimova, A.Ezhkin & A.Beck (2018)

Species of lichen

Bacidia kurilensis is a species of corticolous (bark-dwelling) lichen in the family Ramalinaceae. Found in the Russian Far East, it was formally described as a new species in 2018 by Julia Gerasimova, Aleksandr Ezhkin, and Andreas Beck. The type specimen was collected by the second author from Kunashir Island (Kuril Islands archipelago, Sakhalin Oblast), where it was found growing on the bark of Salix udensis in a mixed conifer-broadleaf forest in a small river valley. The species epithet kurilensis refers to the island group where it was first documented. The lichen has a poorly defined, granular thallus, and a greenish hue in the epihymenium and excipulum edge.
