= Bacidina mendax =

Scientific classification
- Domain: Eukaryota
- Kingdom: Fungi
- Division: Ascomycota
- Class: Lecanoromycetes
- Order: Lecanorales
- Family: Ramalinaceae
- Genus: Bacidina
- Species: B. mendax

Binomial name
- Bacidina mendax Czarnota & Guz.-Krzem. (2018)

Species of lichen

Bacidina mendax is a species of corticolous (bark-dwelling) lichen in the family Ramalinaceae. It is found in Central and Eastern Europe, where it grows on the bark of twigs and tree branches.

== Taxonomy ==
Bacidina mendax was formally described as a species new to science in 2018 by Paweł Czarnota and Beata Guzow-Krzemińska. The type specimen was collected by the first author between Lúka village and Tematísky hrad Castle (Považský Inovec, Slovakia) at an elevation of about 230 m (750 ft); there, it was growing on a roadside Acer platanoides tree. The species epithet mendax refers to its similarity with other European members of the genus Bacidina. Collections of this species were stored in several European herbaria, but they had typically been misidentified as morphs of B. caligans, B. neosquamulosa, B. phacodes, or B. delicata.

== Description ==
The straw-coloured to bright green thallus of Bacidina mendax ranges from "inconspicuous to distinct". It comprises tiny granules aggregated together to form a thin, uneven, scaly crust. The photobiont partner of the lichen is chlorococcoid (i.e., green algae from the family Chlorococcaceae), with roughly spherical cells measuring up to 17 μm in diameter. The apothecia (spore-bearing structures) range in colour from whitish and flesh-coloured throughout, to beige, to pinkish-buff, to brownish; they are 0.2–0.7 mm in diameter with a constricted base.

== Habitat and distribution ==
Bacidina mendax is widespread in Central and Eastern Europe. Countries in which it has been verifiably documented are Czech Republic, Great Britain, Poland, Slovakia, and Ukraine. It has been recorded on a wide variety of hardwood trees and shrubs, and occurs both in anthropogenic areas (e.g., urban parks, roadside trees) as well as old-growth forests.
