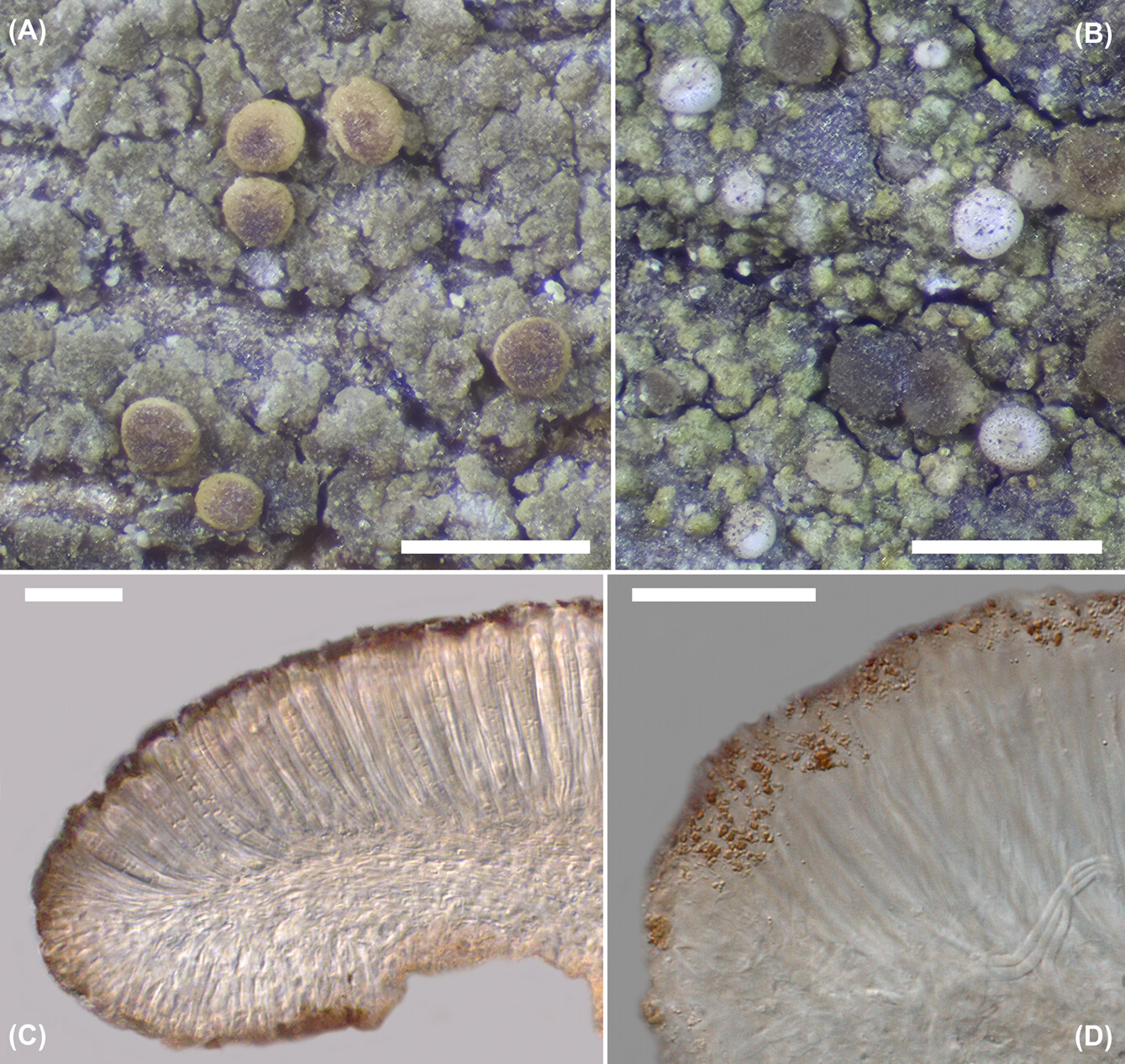
- (A) Thallus with apothecia. (B) Thallus with apothecia in spring showing young, alabaster apothecia with speckles of pigment, and the previous year's dying apothecia. (C) Section through apothecium, showing brown pigment confined to tissue surfaces. (D) Part of section through apothecium, showing the granular nature of the brown pigment. Scales: 0.5 mm (A, B), 25 μm (C, D)

Scientific classification
- Kingdom: Fungi
- Division: Ascomycota
- Class: Lecanoromycetes
- Order: Lecanorales
- Family: Ramalinaceae
- Genus: Bacidina
- Species: B. ferax

Binomial name
- Bacidina ferax S.Ekman (2023)

= Bacidina ferax =

Species of lichen

Bacidina ferax is a species of corticolous (bark-dwelling), crustose lichen in the family Ramalinaceae. It is characterised by its abundant apothecia and unique habitat preferences. It is typically found in seasonally flooded zones along lakes and rivers in central and northern Sweden, as well as in Finland and Russia. This lichen is often confused with other species like Bacidina inundata and Bacidina chloroticula, but can be distinguished by its specific morphological and chemical characteristics.

== Taxonomy ==
Bacidina ferax was first described by lichenologist Stefan Ekman as a new species in 2023, with the type specimen collected from Uppland, Sweden on Salix cinerea. The species epithet ferax is a Latin adjective meaning "fruitful", alluding to the abundance of apothecia produced by this lichen.

== Description ==
Bacidina ferax forms a crustose thallus composed of rounded to effigurate (formless) areoles that fuse together, creating a continuous crust. The apothecia vary in colour from isabelline to almost black, with pigmentation appearing as distinct, superficial layers of aggregated pigment crystals. The proper exciple, a structural component of the apothecium, has distinctly radiating and dichotomously branched hyphae.

The lichen's photobiont is a unicellular member of the Trebouxiophyceae group, with more or less ellipsoid cells. The apothecia are biatorine in form and abundant, ranging in size from 0.15 to 0.3 mm in diameter. The colour of the disc varies from isabelline to tan, brown, or brown-black, with the margin often being slightly paler than the disc.

Apothecia in Bacidina ferax tend to be pale and almost unpigmented when young, gradually becoming more pigmented with age. Apothecia appear to be short-lived and produced in distinct generations. The lichen could be confused with Bacidina inundata and Bacidina chloroticula, but can be distinguished by its smaller apothecia, pigmentation patterns, and other morphological characteristics.

== Habitat and distribution ==
Bacidina ferax is primarily found in central and northern Sweden, including the provinces of Värmland, Uppland, Dalarna, Gästrikland, and Jämtland. It has also been recorded in Finland and Russia. The lichen prefers a specific habitat: seasonally flooded zones along lakes and rivers. It grows on the bark of various phorophytes, such as Salix cinerea, Alnus glutinosa, Populus tremula, and Quercus robur, at or above the highest water level. The species is often associated with another lichen, Lecania prasinoides.

Bacidina margallensis, described from a single specimen in the Himalayan foothills of Pakistan, appears to be similar to Bacidina ferax, although further study is needed to confirm their relationship. The author suggests that some forms described under Bacidia inundata may turn out to be synonymous with Bacidina ferax.
