= Bacidina sorediata =

Scientific classification
- Kingdom: Fungi
- Division: Ascomycota
- Class: Lecanoromycetes
- Order: Lecanorales
- Family: Ramalinaceae
- Genus: Bacidina
- Species: B. sorediata

Binomial name
- Bacidina sorediata Seaward & Lücking (2011)

Species of lichen

Bacidina sorediata is a species of foliicolous (leaf-dwelling) lichen in the family Ramalinaceae. Found in the Seychelles, it was described as new to science in 2011. It is characterized by its distinct sorediate thallus and pale yellow to orange apothecia.

== Taxonomy ==
Bacidina sorediata was first scientifically described by lichenologists Mark Seaward and Robert Lücking as a new species in 2011. The species name sorediata is derived from the sorediate thallus, which is an unusual feature in the genus. The type specimen was found on Mahé island in the Seychelles on a path to Le Niol Road at an elevation of 70 m (230 ft) in January 1974.

== Description ==
The Bacidina sorediata lichen has a foliicolous (leaf-dwelling) thallus, measuring 5–10 mm (0.2–0.4 in) across and 15–20 μm thick. The thallus appears granulose due to the presence of minute, corticate, granulose to microsquamulose patches. The lichen has a pale olive-green colour with yellowish-white soredia, which are initially separate but may become confluent. Although the thallus granules are referred to as "soredia" in this publication, other researchers have called them goniocysts, and the inconsistent usage of the terminology has caused confusion in the literature.

The photobiont, or photosynthetic partner, in Bacidina sorediata is a chlorococcoid alga with cells ranging from 5–10 μm in diameter. The apothecia, or reproductive structures, are rounded and range in size from 0.25–0.5 mm in diameter, with a pale yellow to orange-yellow colour. The ascospores, or spores produced in the asci, are bacillar to very narrowly clavate and 3-septate, measuring 25 35 by 1.2–1.7 μm.

Bacidina sorediata is distinct from other similar species in the genus due to the combination of a microsquamulose thallus with discrete, differently colored soralia. No secondary chemical substances have been detected in this species.

=== Similar species ===
The genus Bacidina includes crustose lichens that typically have a granulose to microsquamulose thallus and pale yellow to orange apothecia. Bacidina sorediata shares features with other common foliicolous species such as B. apiahica, B. defecta, and B. scutellifera. However, Bacidina sorediata's unique combination of a distinctly microsquamulose thallus and soralia sets it apart from these other species.

== Habitat and distribution ==
Bacidina sorediata is known from a rich collection of specimens found in the Seychelles, an archipelago in the Indian Ocean. The specific habitat preferences of this lichen species are yet to be determined.
