= Bacidina contecta =

Scientific classification
- Kingdom: Fungi
- Division: Ascomycota
- Class: Lecanoromycetes
- Order: Lecanorales
- Family: Ramalinaceae
- Genus: Bacidina
- Species: B. contecta

Binomial name
- Bacidina contecta S.Ekman & T.Sprib. (2009)

Species of lichen

Bacidina contecta is a species of lichen in the family Ramalinaceae, first found in inland rainforests of British Columbia. This small lichen forms olive-green crusts on the stems of shrubs like blueberry and forms tiny, pale fruiting bodies that are easily overlooked. It was discovered in 2009 and is known from scattered locations in southeastern British Columbia, Idaho, and Montana, where it grows in humid old-growth forests.

== Taxonomy ==
The species was described in 2009 by Stefan Ekman and Toby Spribille after inland-rain-forest surveys in British Columbia, Idaho and Montana. Bacidina is placed in the ramalinioid clade of the order Lecanorales, and so far B. contecta has no known close relative supported by DNA data. Morphologically it can be mistaken for the Californian B. californica or the European B. phacodes, but differs from the former by its much smaller, pigment-free apothecia and narrower spores, and from the latter by spores with fewer septa and a thallus that is microsquamulose rather than grey and continuous.

The species epithet contecta (Latin for 'hidden' or 'concealed') refers to how easily the lichen was overlooked among pale-coloured Biatora species on the lower stems of dwarf shrubs. The holotype was collected at 1700 m in the Sicamous Creek research area east of Sicamous, British Columbia, and is preserved in the University of British Columbia herbarium with an isotype (duplicate) in Uppsala.

== Description ==
Bacidina contecta forms a low, olive-green crust that soaks up water and turns dark green but dries to a matt, slightly wrinkled surface. Microscope sections show the body (thallus) is only 40–370 μm thick and made of tiny granules that later fuse into irregular patches 0.2–0.4 mm across; the embedded green-algal partner is sheathed in jelly-like envelopes around 7–9 μm wide. Minute, round to slightly lobed fruit-bodies (apothecia) sit flush with or barely rise above the thallus. They are pale beige to wax-white—occasionally hinting at pink—and reach just 0.13–0.64 mm in diameter. The colourless outer rim (proper exciple) is strongly gelatinised and lacks any crystalline pigments, while the spore-bearing layer (hymenium) is similarly unpigmented and iodine-negative, indicating the cell walls contain no starch-like compounds. Inside each slender, Bacidia-type ascus eight needle-shaped ascospores develop; they are often gently twisted, (28.5–44 × 1.0–1.9 μm) and usually have one or two internal cross-walls (septa). No asexual reproductive structures (pycnidia) have been seen and standard chemical spot tests are uniformly negative, suggesting the lichen produces no distinctive secondary metabolites.

== Habitat and distribution ==
All confirmed records fall within the humid inland rain-forest belt of south-eastern British Columbia and adjacent Idaho and Montana. The lichen grows at 600–1,700 m (2,000–5,600 ft) above sea level on the slender stems of Vaccinium membranaceum, V. ovalifolium and Rhododendron albiflorum, and once on the bark of a young Acer glabrum. Stands are typically old-growth cedar–hemlock (Thuja plicata–Tsuga heterophylla) or subalpine fir–spruce (Abies lasiocarpa–Picea engelmannii) forests where humidity stays high throughout the year. Colonies usually sit within 30 cm (12 in) of the ground, often sharing the substrate with Arthonia exilis, several pale-disked Biatora species, Caloplaca sorocarpa, and Lecidea albohyalina.

The species is known from two sites in British Columbia and single localities in each of Idaho and Montana, but the authors suspect it is more widespread and simply overlooked because of its size and pale colouring. Occurrences span both the rain-wet canyon floors of the Incomappleux River—the wettest core of the inland rain forest—and drier fringe forests that intergrade into subalpine fir–spruce zones, indicating some tolerance of moisture variation as long as intact forest structure is maintained.
