= Bacidia termitophila =

Scientific classification
- Kingdom: Fungi
- Division: Ascomycota
- Class: Lecanoromycetes
- Order: Lecanorales
- Family: Ramalinaceae
- Genus: Bacidia
- Species: B. termitophila

Binomial name
- Bacidia termitophila Aptroot & M.Cáceres (2014)
- Holotype: Parque Natural Municipal de Porto Velho, Brazil

Species of lichen

Bacidia termitophila is a species of foliose lichen in the family Ramalinaceae. It colonises the soil of termite nests within Brazilian rainforests. It was scientifically described in 2014, distinguished by its unique growth habitat and distinct morphological features.

== Taxonomy ==
Described by the lichenologists André Aptroot and Marcela Eugenia da Silva Cáceres in 2014, Bacidia termitophila was identified from a termite nest on the forest floor in the Parque Natural Municipal de Porto Velho, Rondônia, Brazil. This species has unique characteristics that differentiate it significantly from other Bacidia species (particularly the fusiform, 3-septate ascospores), suggesting a lack of clarity about its true placement within or outside the core Bacidia group.

== Description ==
The thallus of Bacidia termitophila is very thin, smooth, patchily shiny, and continuous, with a green colour. It is ecorticate, meaning it lacks a cortical layer, a protective layer typically found in other lichens. The algae within the thallus are chlorococcoid, measuring approximately 5–10 μm in diameter.

Apothecia, the reproductive structures where spores are produced, are appressed to the thallus, measuring 0.3–0.6 mm in diameter. They are typically solitary or clustered, convex in shape, with a dull chocolate brown colour that darkens to black as they age. The apothecia's margins are covered by the convex disc, making them invisible from above.

The hymenium, the tissue layer containing the spore-producing asci, is clear (hyaline) and measures 85–105 μm in height. It reacts to iodine staining (IKI) by turning bluish. The asci are of the Bacidia-type and typically contain eight, 3-septate, fusiform ascospores that are 17–20 by 4–5 μm in size, with pointed ends.

Chemical tests on the thallus are uniformly negative (UV−, C−, K−, KC−, P−), indicating no detectable secondary metabolites typically found in many lichens.

== Habitat and distribution ==
Bacidia termitophila is known only from its type locality in Brazil, where it grows exclusively on the soil of termite nests within primary rainforests.
