= Bacidia elongata =

Scientific classification
- Domain: Eukaryota
- Kingdom: Fungi
- Division: Ascomycota
- Class: Lecanoromycetes
- Order: Lecanorales
- Family: Ramalinaceae
- Genus: Bacidia
- Species: B. elongata

Binomial name
- Bacidia elongata Gerasimova & A.Beck (2018)

Species of lichen

Bacidia elongata is a species of corticolous (bark-dwelling) lichen in the family Ramalinaceae. Found in the Russian Far East, it was formally described as a new species in 2018 by Julia Gerasimova and Andreas Beck. The type specimen was collected by the first author from the Bolshekhekhtsirskiy State Natural Reserve (Khabarovsky District), where it was found growing on the bark of Acer mono in a coniferous-broadleaf forest near a river. It has also been collected in Primorsky Krai. The species epithet refers to the wide zone of enlarged cell lumina along the edge of the exciple.
