= Vezdaea schuyleriana =

Scientific classification
- Domain: Eukaryota
- Kingdom: Fungi
- Division: Ascomycota
- Order: Vezdaeales
- Family: Vezdaeaceae
- Genus: Vezdaea
- Species: V. schuyleriana

Binomial name
- Vezdaea schuyleriana Lendemer (2011)

Species of lichen

Vezdaea schuyleriana is a lichen that is only known to exist on a single boulder near Lewisburg, Pennsylvania. It was discovered by James Lendemer, then a doctoral student at the New York Botanical Garden and research associate at the Academy of Natural Sciences, who published his discovery in the March 2011 issue of Notulae Natureae. He named it in honor of Dr. Alfred "Ernie" Schuyler, emeritus curator of botany at the Academy.
