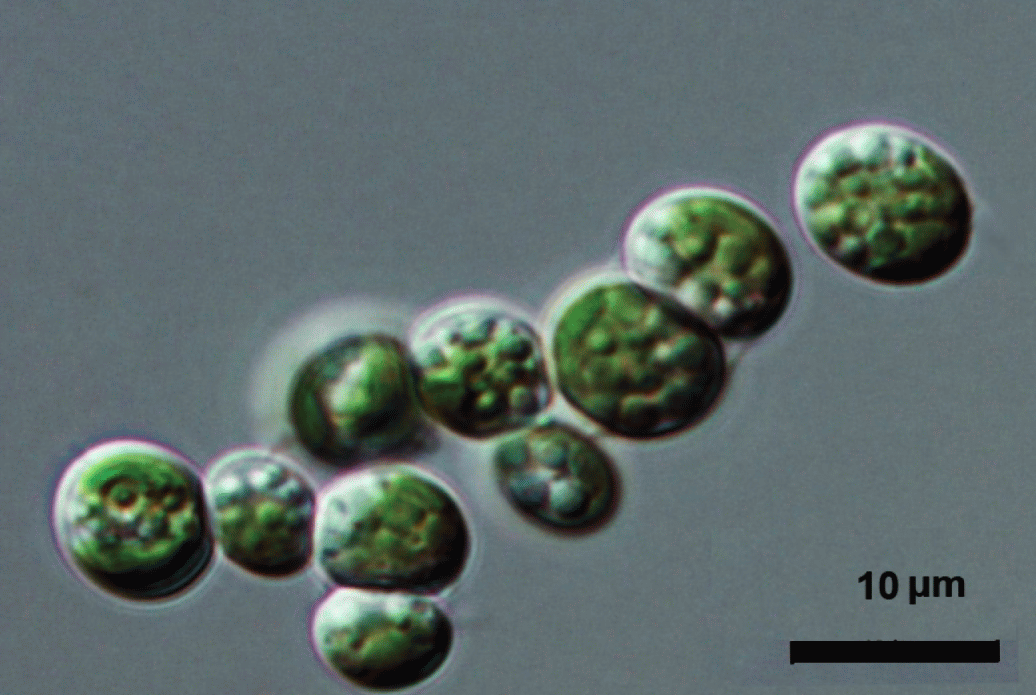
- Elliptochloris bilobata

Scientific classification
- Kingdom: Plantae
- Division: Chlorophyta
- Class: Trebouxiophyceae
- Order: incertae sedis
- Family: incertae sedis
- Genus: Elliptochloris; Tscherm.-Woess

Species
- Elliptochloris antarctica (Tschermak-Woess & Friedmann) Darienko & Pröschold; Elliptochloris bilobata Tschermak-Woess; Elliptochloris incisiformis L.Hoffmann & I.Kostikov; Elliptochloris marina Letsch; Elliptochloris perforata Hoffmann & Kostikov; Elliptochloris philistinensis Novis & Visnovsky; Elliptochloris reniformis Darienko & Pröschold; Elliptochloris subsphaerica (Reisigl) Ettl & G.Gärtner

= Elliptochloris =

Genus of algae

Elliptochloris is a genus of green algae in the order Prasiolales. Species of this genus are common and found in a variety of terrestrial habitats such as soils. Some species in the genus are photobiont partners in lichens. One species, E. marina, is a symbiont within two species of sea anemone, Anthopleura elegantissima and A. xanthogrammica. It seems to have a worldwide distribution.

== Description ==
Elliptochloris consists of solitary cells which are spherical to ellipsoidal, or cylindrical or slightly curved. Cells contain a single parietal chloroplast which may be band-shaped, trough-shaped, hollow and spherical; the chloroplasts may be lobed or not, and with or without a pyrenoid. Cells contain a single nucleus.

Reproduction occurs by the formation of autospores, which come in two different morphologies: S-type, which are larger, ellipsoidal and formed in groups of 2–4 per sporangium, and E-type, which are smaller, rod-shaped, and formed in groups of 16-32 per sporangium. The formation of two different autospore morphologies is characteristic for Elliptochloris. However, some strains (for example SAG 2200) only produce one type of autospores, and when found as photobionts in lichens, the algae tend to only produce S-type autospores.

== Phylogenetics ==
Elliptochloris forms a monophyletic clade that is sister to Coccomyxa.
