= Bacidina flavoleprosa =

Scientific classification
- Domain: Eukaryota
- Kingdom: Fungi
- Division: Ascomycota
- Class: Lecanoromycetes
- Order: Lecanorales
- Family: Ramalinaceae
- Genus: Bacidina
- Species: B. flavoleprosa

Binomial name
- Bacidina flavoleprosa Czarnota & Guzow-Krzem. (2012)

Species of lichen

Bacidina flavoleprosa is a species of saxicolous (rock-dwelling), leprose (powdery) lichen in the family Ramalinaceae. It is found in a single locality in the Czech Republic.

== Taxonomy ==
Bacidina flavoleprosa was formally described as a new species in 2012 by Paweł Czarnota and Beata Guzow-Krzemińska. The type specimen was collected by the first author about 300 m (980 ft) west of Líchovy village in the Středočeská pahorkatina foothills of central Bohemia; there, at an altitude of 350 m (1,150 ft), it was found growing on the vertical faces of granite boulders in a humid microhabitat. It is only known to occur at the type locality; the only other lichen in the vicinity was Arthonia muscigena. The species epithet flavoleprosa refers to the green, leprose thallus.

== Description ==
Bacidina flavoleprosa has a sulphur-green thallus that is densely covered with soredia. The photobiont partner of the lichen is chlorococcoid, and they have cells that are typically 5–12 μm in diameter. The thallus forms areas with cracked patches of goniocysts (small aggregations of photobiont cells enclosed by hyphae forming a roundish structure). Apothecia occur rarely; if present, they are beige to pale brown and measure 0.10–0.45 mm in diameter with a darker disc and a whitish-beige margin. Ascospores are long and needle-shaped (acicular) with from 1 to 3 septa and dimensions of 25–30 by 10–15 μm. No lichen products were detected in this species using thin-layer chromatography.
