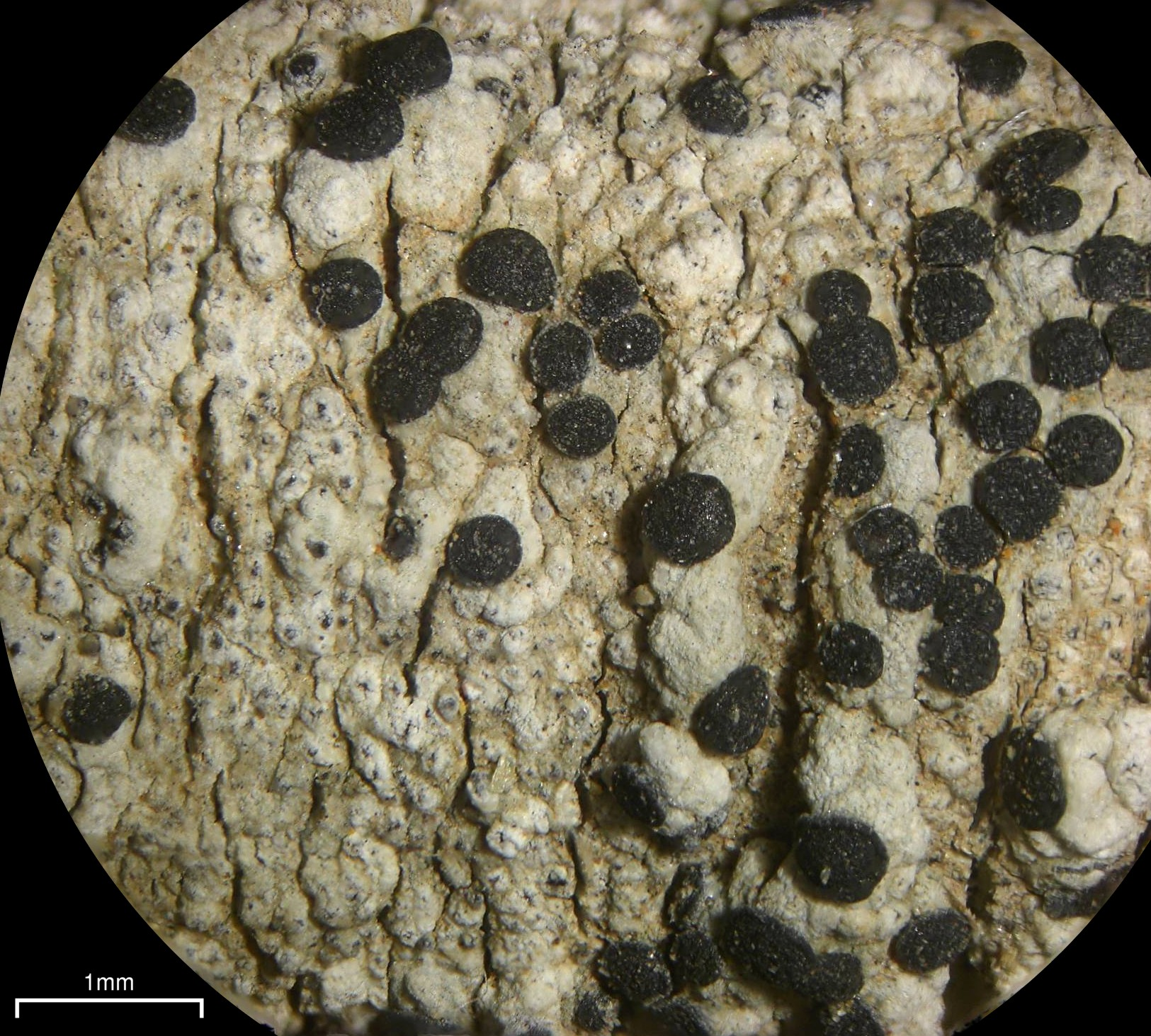
- Bacidina californica, magnified 30X

Scientific classification
- Kingdom: Fungi
- Division: Ascomycota
- Class: Lecanoromycetes
- Order: Lecanorales
- Family: Ramalinaceae
- Genus: Bacidina; Vězda (1991)

Type species
- Bacidina phacodes (Körb.) Vězda (1991)

Species
- See text

= Bacidina =

Genus of lichens

Bacidina is a genus of crustose lichens in the family Ramalinaceae.

== Taxonomy ==
The genus was circumscribed by Czech lichenologist Antonín Vězda in 1990, with Bacidina phacodes assigned as the type species. Vězda included 11 species in Bacidina, which was originally classified in the Lecideaceae. These species had previously been placed in genus Bacidia.

== Description ==
Bacidina species are crustose lichens, forming thin, often inconspicuous thalli that may be smooth, cracked, warted, or granular. Some species develop specialised reproductive structures such as soredia, isidia, or microsquamules. The thallus is typically pale in colouration, ranging from whitish and pale green to greyish or fawn. The photosynthetic partner (photobiont) consists of chlorococcoid algae, which have roughly spherical (globose) to broadly ellipsoidal cells.

The reproductive structures, or apothecia, are relatively small, usually up to 1 mm in diameter, and can be flat or strongly convex. They lack a distinct thalline margin but have a well-developed true exciple, which is composed largely of thick-walled cells with isodiametric to ellipsoidal lumina. This distinguishes Bacidina from Bacidia, which has a true exciple made of radiating hyphal tissue with narrow lumina. The hymenium, a spore-producing layer, reacts with iodine (I+) to stain blue. The underlying hypothecium varies in colouration from colourless to pigmented. The paraphyses within the hymenium are generally few in number, sometimes branched, and often have swollen tips.

The asci, which produce the ascospores, are club-shaped (clavate) to cylindrical-clavate in shape and typically contain eight spores. Most Bacidina species have asci of the Bacidia type, characterised by an apical dome that stains dark blue in K/I with a pale, conical apical cushion. In some species, the ascus resembles the Biatora type, which has a darker-staining zone around the apical cushion. The ascospores are colourless, generally three- or more-septate at maturity, and often filiform (thread-like), acicular (needle-shaped), or sigmoid (curved like an "S"), though some species have spores that are cylindrical to fusiform. A distinct outer spore coating (perispore) is absent.

Asexual reproduction occurs through conidia, which are produced in small, often immersed or sessile pycnidia. The conidia are colourless and vary in shape, with some species producing septate conidia. Bacidina species do not contain secondary metabolites that react with common chemical spot tests (C−, K−, KC−, Pd−, I−, UV−), but their apothecia and pycnidia may contain a variety of pigments.

== Species ==
As of February 2025, Species Fungorum (in the Catalogue of Life) accepts 53 species of Bacidina, although a total of 85 taxa have been described in the genus.

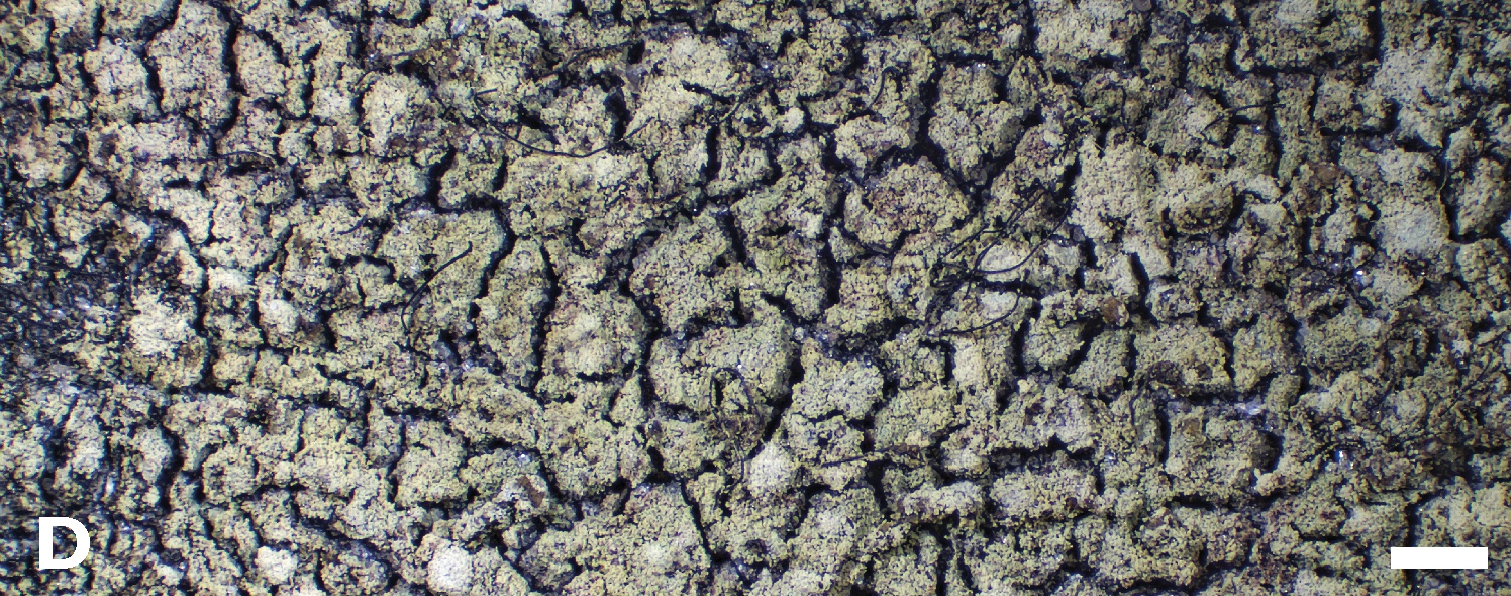
The thick, sterile thallus of Bacidina adastra

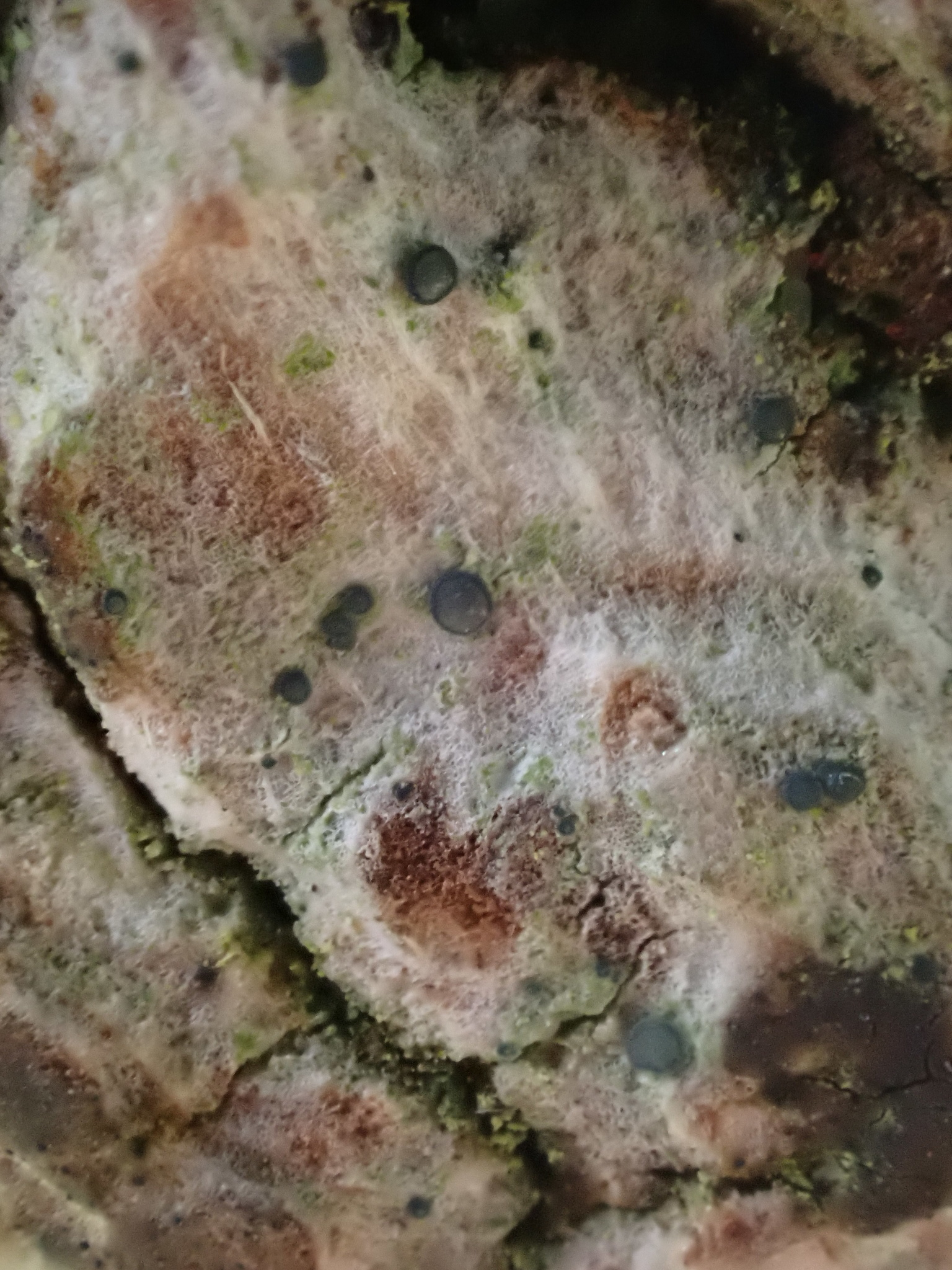
Bacidina caerulea

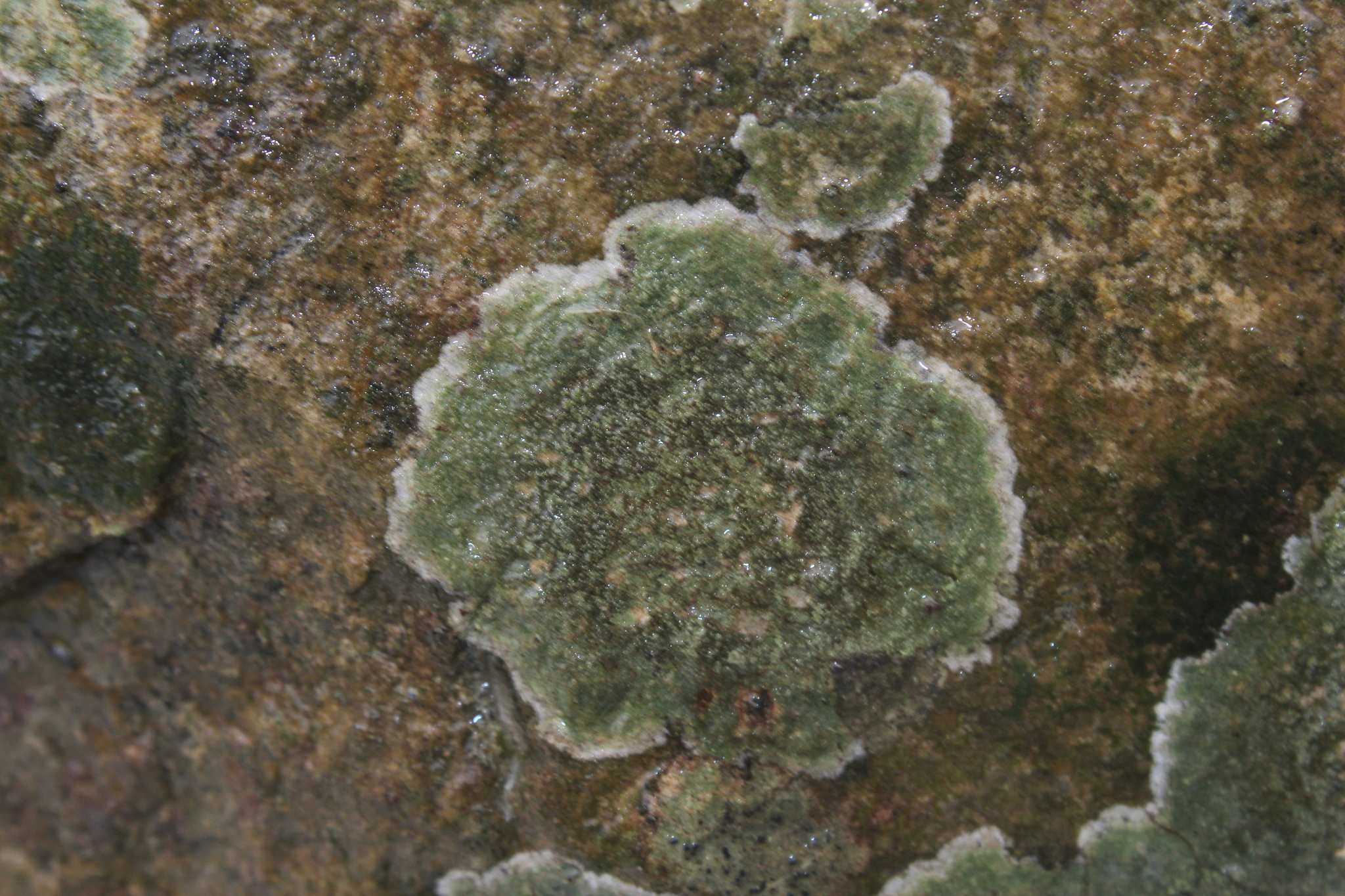
Bacidina egenula

- Bacidina acerina Vondrák, Svoboda & Malíček (2023) – Europe
- Bacidina adastra (Sparrius & Aptroot) M.Hauck & V.Wirth (2010)
- Bacidina aenea S.Ekman (1996)
- Bacidina aeruginosa van den Boom (2021)
- Bacidina apiahica (Müll.Arg.) Vězda (1991)
- Bacidina arnoldiana (Körb.) V.Wirth & Vězda (1994)
- Bacidina arvidssonii (Sérus.) Lücking (2008)
- Bacidina assulata (Körb.) S.Ekman (1996)
- Bacidina brandii (Coppins & van den Boom) M.Hauck & V.Wirth (2010)
- Bacidina brittoniana (Riddle) LaGreca & S.Ekman (2014)
- Bacidina caerulea (Körb.) S.Ekman (2023)
- Bacidina californica S.Ekman (1996)
- Bacidina caligans (Nyl.) Llop & Hladun (2002)
- Bacidina canariensis Lumbsch & Vězda (1992)
- Bacidina celtica van den Boom & Llop (2021)
- Bacidina chloroticula (Nyl.) Vězda & Poelt (1991)
- Bacidina cinnamomea (Kremp.) Farkas (2015)
- Bacidina circumpallens (Nyl.) S.Ekman (2023)
- Bacidina circumpulla S.Ekman (2020)
- Bacidina clauzadei (Sérus. & Lambinon) Farkas (2015)
- Bacidina contecta S.Ekman & T.Sprib. (2009)
- Bacidina convexa van den Boom (2017) – Panama
- Bacidina crystallifera S.Ekman 1996)
- Bacidina defecta Vězda (1994)
- Bacidina delicata (Larbal. ex Leight.) V.Wirth & Vězda (1994)
- Bacidina dichroma van den Boom (2014) – Guatemala
- Bacidina digitalis M.Cáceres & Lücking (2007)
- Bacidina dissecta S.Ekman (2004)
- Bacidina egenula (Nyl.) Vězda (1991)
- Bacidina etayana (van den Boom & Vězda) M.Hauck & V.Wirth (2010)
- Bacidina ferax S.Ekman (2023)
- Bacidina flavoleprosa Czarnota & Guzow-Krzem. (2012)
- Bacidina fuscosquamulosa van den Boom (2014) – Guatemala
- Bacidina hypophylla Lücking & Kalb (2000) – Brazil
- Bacidina indigens (Vain.) S.Ekman & J.Gerasimova (2017)
- Bacidina inundata (Fr.) Vězda (1991)
- Bacidina iqbalii K.Habib & Khalid (2020) – Pakistan
- Bacidina jasonhurii J.P.Halda, S.Y.Kondr. & Lőkös (2019)
- Bacidina lacerata (Timdal) Kistenich, Timdal, Bendiksby & S.Ekman (2018)
- Bacidina lignicola S.Ekman (2023)
- Bacidina loekoesiana S.Y.Kondr. & Hur (2019)
- Bacidina maculans S.Ekman (2023)
- Bacidina margallensis M.Fatima, K.Habib & Khalid (2020) – Pakistan
- Bacidina medialis (Tuck. ex Nyl.) Kistenich, Timdal, Bendiksby & S.Ekman (2018)
- Bacidina mendax Czarnota & Guz.-Krzem. (2018) – Europe
- Bacidina mirabilis (Vězda) Vězda (1991)
- Bacidina modesta (Zwackh ex Vain.) S.Ekman (2019)
- Bacidina multiseptata M.Cáceres & Lücking (2007)
- Bacidina neglecta (Vězda) Vězda (1991)
- Bacidina neosquamulosa (Aptroot & Herk) S.Ekman (2004)
- Bacidina neotropica Lücking (2008)
- Bacidina pallidocarnea (Müll.Arg.) Vězda (1991)
- Bacidina pallidocarpa van den Boom & Magain (2020) – Macaronesia
- Bacidina paradoxa Palice (2023)
- Bacidina phacodes (Körb.) Vězda (1991)
- Bacidina piceae van den Boom (2021)
- Bacidina populnea S.Ekman (2023)
- Bacidina pseudohyphophorifera (Lücking & Sérus.) Lücking (2008)
- Bacidina pseudoisidiata van den Boom (2013) – Tenerife
- Bacidina pulverula van den Boom (2022) – Ecuador
- Bacidina pycnidiata (Czarnota & Coppins) Czarnota & Guz.-Krzem. (2018)
- Bacidina saxenii (Erichsen) M.Hauck & V.Wirth (2010)
- Bacidina scutellifera (Vězda) Vězda (1991)
- Bacidina simplex Farkas & Vězda (1993)
- Bacidina squamellosa S.Ekman (1996)
- Bacidina sorediata Seaward & Lücking (2011)
- Bacidina streimannii Vězda (1994)
- Bacidina subfuscula (Nyl.) S.Ekman (2023)
- Bacidina sulphurella (Samp.) M.Hauck & V.Wirth (2010)
- Bacidina tarandina S.Ekman (2023)
- Bacidina tenella (Kullh.) S.Ekman (2023)
- Bacidina terricola van den Boom & Alvarado (2019)
- Bacidina varia S.Ekman (1996)
- Bacidina vasakii (Vězda) Vězda (1991)
- Bacidina violacea van den Boom & Magain (2020) – Macaronesia
- Bacidina ziamensis (Vězda) Vězda (1991)
