= Bacidina circumpulla =

Scientific classification
- Kingdom: Fungi
- Division: Ascomycota
- Class: Lecanoromycetes
- Order: Lecanorales
- Family: Ramalinaceae
- Genus: Bacidina
- Species: B. circumpulla

Binomial name
- Bacidina circumpulla S.Ekman (2020)

Species of lichen

Bacidina circumpulla is a species of crustose lichen in the family Ramalinaceae. Found in Alaska and British Columbia, it was described as a new species in 2020 by Stefan Ekman.

== Taxonomy ==
The type specimen was collected in the Hoonah-Angoon Census Area area of Glacier Bay National Park, as part of a comprehensive lichen inventory of this park. Here the species was found on the shoreline of the Queen Inlet growing on a rotting driftwood log. The specific epithet circumpulla refers to the shiny black ring formed by pigment in the top part of the margin of the apothecium that encircles the paler disc.

== Description ==
The crustose thallus of Bacidina circumpulla comprises firm squamules (scales) that can be discrete, contiguous, or overlapping. Individual squamules are up to 350 μm wide with a pale grey, yellowish, or brownish color. Its ascospores range in length from 26–54 μm (averaging 37 μm), and typically have three to five thin septa. Pycnidia are scattered across the surface, immersed in the thallus with a protruding ostiole that is 60–100 μm in diameter. All lichen spot test reactions are negative.

Biological pigments that occur in this lichen are Laurocerasi-brown in the proper exciple, hymenium and wall of the pycnidium, Bagliettoana-green in the hymenium and uppermost part of proper exciple, and sometimes small amounts of Rubella-orange.

== Habitat and distribution ==
Bacidina circumpulla has been recorded from Alaska and inland British Columbia. It has been found growing on a decaying polypore fungus, and the exposed, soft rotting wood of a log near the seashore.
