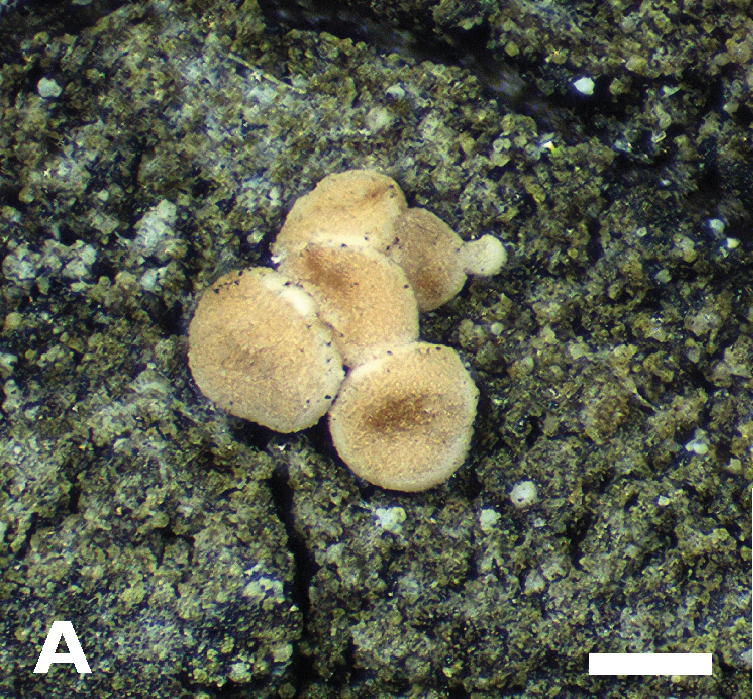
- Apothecia of Bacidina pycnidiata; scale bar is 0.25 mm

Scientific classification
- Kingdom: Fungi
- Division: Ascomycota
- Class: Lecanoromycetes
- Order: Lecanorales
- Family: Ramalinaceae
- Genus: Bacidina
- Species: B. pycnidiata

Binomial name
- Bacidina pycnidiata (Czarnota & Coppins) Czarnota & Guz.-Krzem. (2018)

Synonyms
- Bacidia pycnidiata Czarnota & Coppins (2006)

= Bacidina pycnidiata =

Species of lichen

Bacidina pycnidiata is a species of crustose lichen in the family Ramalinaceae. It is widely distributed in Europe and North Asia. It is characterised by its whitish or cream-coloured pycnidia with long and ostiolar necks.

== Taxonomy ==
The lichen was formally described as new to science in 2006 by lichenologists Paweł Czarnota and Brian John Coppins. The type specimen was collected by the first author west of the village of Bílá Voda, near a marble quarry (Eastern Sudetes, Golden Mountains, Czech Republic). There, in a mixed spruce-ash forest at an altitude of about 360 m (1,180 ft), it was found growing over bryophytes on marble rocks. The species epithet pycnidiata refers to the long-necked pycnidia that are characteristic of this species.

The lichen was originally placed in the genus Bacidia based largely on the characteristics of the apothecia. The authors noted, however, that some traits of the new species (e.g. a paraplectenchymatous outer exciple; narrow, needle-shaped ascospores; and threadlike conidia) suggested a placement in the segregate genus Bacidina. Due to uncertainties about the circumscription and nomenclature of that group, the authors instead included it in Bacidia sensu lato (in the broad sense). Molecular phylogenetic analysis showed that the lichen clearly belongs to Bacidina (related to B. inundata and B. caligans), and so a formal transfer to that genus was proposed by Czarnota and Beata Guzow-Krzemińska in 2018.

== Description ==
The crustose, greyish green thallus of Bacidina pycnidiata comprises tiny granules that are 20–30 μm in diameter. The granules are goniocysts, which are small, roundish aggregations of photobiont cells surrounded by fungal hyphae. The photobiont partner is chlorococcoid (i.e., green algae with a coccoid shape); their cells are either more or less spherical with a diameter of 7–13 μm, or ellipsoid, with dimensions of 8–12 by 5–8 μm.

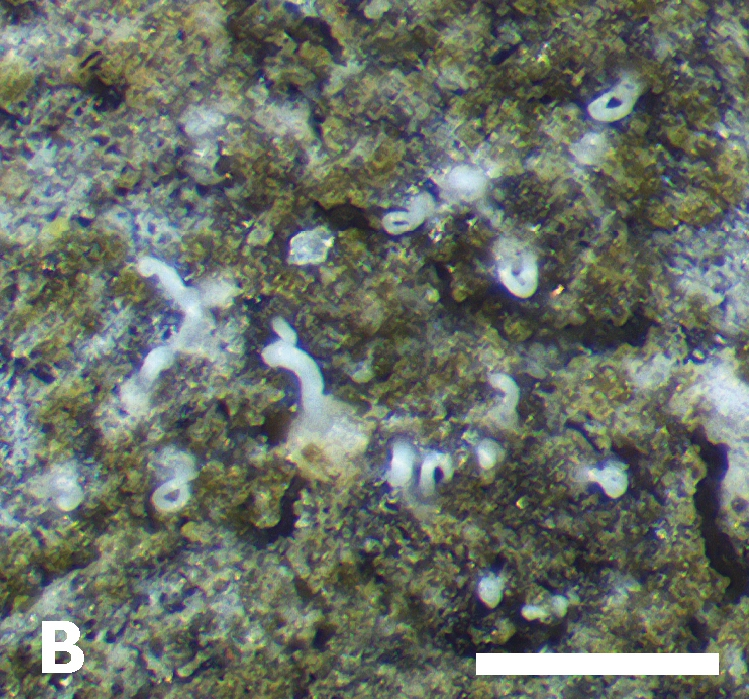
Pycnidia with long and curved necks; scale bar=0.25 mm

Bacidina pycnidiata produces pale apothecia that are 0.2–0.5 mm in diameter and up to 0.6 mm tall, and range in colour from whitish cream, to flesh-coloured, to pale brownish. Initially, they are constricted at the base with a slightly concave disc and a thick margin; this margin becomes thinner or even disappears in older individuals. The asci are of the Bacidia-type, with a cylindrical shape, a poorly developed or absent ocular chamber, and dimensions of 35–40 by 6–8 μm. Ascospores are needle-shaped (acicular) with three transverse septa, measuring 35–50 by 1–1.2 μm. The pycnidia have a whitish to cream colour (brownish in older specimens) and are more or less spherical with a diameter of 90–190 μm and an ostiolar neck measuring 120–200 μm.

No lichen products were detected in this species using thin-layer chromatography, and the expected results of standard chemical spot tests are all negative.

== Habitat and distribution ==
Bacidina pycnidiata is a pioneer species that grows over bryophytes, both terrestrial and epiphytic. Habitats include both old-growth and managed forests, and anthropogenic areas. Occasionally the lichen has been recorded on tree bark in shaded areas, or growing on other lichens, as was the case with Caucasian specimens found growing on Nephroma parile.

Originally described as having a distribution in mountainous areas of Central Europe, several records of Bacidina pycnidiata have been published that have expanded its known range considerably. It has been recorded from Belgium, the Czech Republic, Estonia, Finland, Lithuania, Mordovia (Russia), Poland, North Caucasus, Siberia, and Ukraine.

Bacidina pycnidiata is part of a community of epiphytic (plant-associated) lichens known as the Lobarion pulmonariae. This includes the following associated lichens: Agonimia allobata, Acrocordia gemmata, Arthonia byssacea, Cetrelia monachorum, Cladonia coniocraea, Cresponea chloroconia, Flavoparmelia caperata, Graphis pulverulenta, Lepraria lobicans, Leptogium cyanescens, Lobaria pulmonaria, Pachyphiale fagicola, Peltigera neckeri, Pertusaria albescens, P. coccodes, Phlyctis argena, Ramalina pollinaria, Scytinium subtile, and S. teretiusculum. The association with wet mosses or the thalli of other lichens has been suggested to help Bacidina pycnidiata maintain a level of humidity essential for growth.
