= Bacidia areolata =

Scientific classification
- Domain: Eukaryota
- Kingdom: Fungi
- Division: Ascomycota
- Class: Lecanoromycetes
- Order: Lecanorales
- Family: Ramalinaceae
- Genus: Bacidia
- Species: B. areolata

Binomial name
- Bacidia areolata Gerasimova & A.Beck (2018)

Species of lichen

Bacidia areolata is a rare species of corticolous (bark-dwelling) lichen in the family Ramalinaceae. Found in the Russian Far East, it was formally described as a new species in 2018 by Julia Gerasimova and Andreas Beck. The type specimen was collected by the first author from the Bolshekhekhtsirskiy State Natural Reserve (Khabarovsky District), where it was found growing on the bark of Acer tegmentosum in a coniferous-broadleaf forest near a river. The lichen is only known to occur at the type locality. The species epithet areolata refers to the structure of the thallus, which is areolate.

== Description ==
Bacidia areolata is similar to Bacidia suffusa, but unlike that species, has an areolate thallus and lighter-coloured apothecia. These apothecia, which typically measure 0.4–0.6 mm in diameter, are more or less flat when young and either remain so in maturity or become somewhat convex. They have a pale pink to peach-coloured disc that sometimes becomes mottled in maturity, and a pale pink to yellow-brown margin. Ascospores are straight to slightly curved, and measure 47–67 μm long by 3–4 μm wide, with anywhere from 6 to 15 septa.
