= Bacidia sachalinensis =

Scientific classification
- Domain: Eukaryota
- Kingdom: Fungi
- Division: Ascomycota
- Class: Lecanoromycetes
- Order: Lecanorales
- Family: Ramalinaceae
- Genus: Bacidia
- Species: B. sachalinensis

Binomial name
- Bacidia sachalinensis Gerasimova, A.Ezhkin & A.Beck (2018)

Species of lichen

Bacidia sachalinensis is a little-known species of corticolous (bark-dwelling) lichen in the family Ramalinaceae. Found in the Russian Far East, it was formally described as a new species in 2018 by Julia Gerasimova, Aleksandr Ezhkin, and Andreas Beck. The type specimen was collected by the second author near the Rogatka River in Yuzhno-Sakhalinsk (Sakhalin Oblast), where it was found growing on the bark of Populus maximowiczii in a floodplain forest; it has only been documented from this location. The species epithet refers to its type locality.
