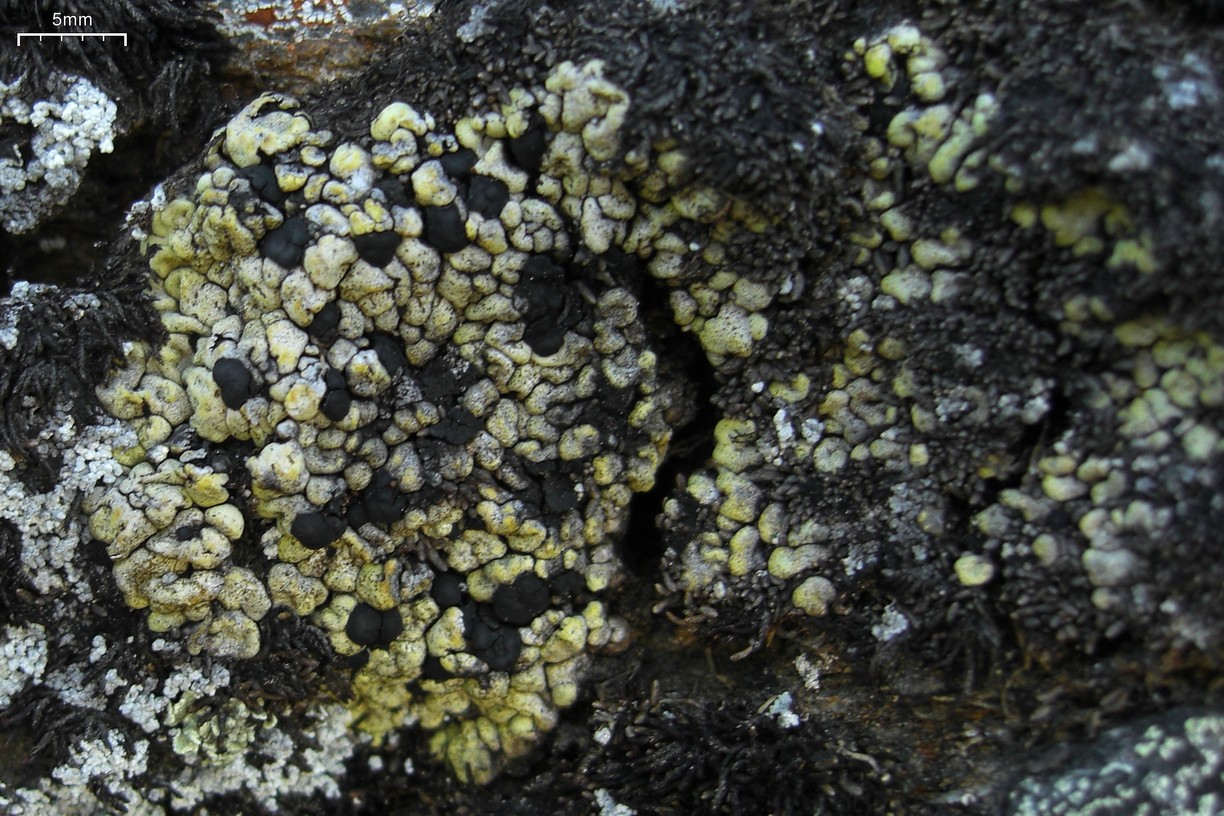
- Catolechia wahlenbergii

Conservation status
- Secure (NatureServe)

Scientific classification
- Kingdom: Fungi
- Division: Ascomycota
- Class: Lecanoromycetes
- Order: Rhizocarpales
- Family: Rhizocarpaceae
- Genus: Catolechia; Flot. (1850)
- Species: C. wahlenbergii

Binomial name
- Catolechia wahlenbergii (Ach.) Flot. (1855)

Synonyms
- Dimaura Norman (1852); Xanthopsis Acloque (1893)

= Catolechia =

Single-species fungal genus

Catolechia is a genus of lichen-forming fungi in the family Rhizocarpaceae. It is a monotypic genus, containing the single species Catolechia wahlenbergii. The genus was circumscribed by the German botanist Julius von Flotow in 1850. He did not assign a type species for the genus; Catolechia pulchella A.Massal. (1852) was designated as the type by Gustav Wilhelm Körber in 1855. This species is synonymous with Catolechia wahlenbergii.

Several species that were originally described as a member of Catolechia have since been transferred to other genera. Examples include:

- Catolechia flavovirescens Flot. (1849) = Arthrorhaphis citrinella
- Catolechia glomerulans Müll.Arg. (1892) = Monerolechia glomerulans
- Catolechia lactea A.Massal. (1852) = Buellia lactea
- Catolechia marginulata Müll.Arg. (1892) = Buellia marginulata
- Catolechia moriopsis A.Massal. (1852) = Orphniospora moriopsis
- Catolechia pyxinoides Müll.Arg. (1861) = Pyxine pyxinoides
- Catolechia subcoronata Müll.Arg. (1892) = Buellia subcoronata
- Catolechia tenuis Müll.Arg. (1861) = Dimelaena tenuis
- Catolechia wahlenbergii ß alpina (Schaer.) Flot. (1849) = Bellemerea alpina

== Habitat and distribution ==
In Nepal, Catolechia wahlenbergii has been reported at 4,500 m elevation in a compilation of published records; this reported range lies above the tree line used in the study.
