= Bacidia biatorina =

Scientific classification
- Domain: Eukaryota
- Kingdom: Fungi
- Division: Ascomycota
- Class: Lecanoromycetes
- Order: Lecanorales
- Family: Ramalinaceae
- Genus: Bacidia
- Species: B. biatorina

Binomial name
- Bacidia biatorina (Körb.) Vain, 1922

Species of fungus

Bacidia biatorina is a species of fungus belonging to the family Ramalinaceae.
