= Elisabeth Tschermak-Woess =

Austrian biologist

- Born: Elisabeth Tschermak; 28 January 1917; Znaim
- Died: 26 April 2001 (aged 84); Vienna
- Spouse: Friedrich Woess
- Scientific career
- Fields: Cytology, phycology, lichenology
- Institutions: University of Vienna
- Author abbrev. (botany): Tscherm.-Woess

Elisabeth Tschermak-Woess (28 January 1917 – 26 April 2001) was an Austrian University lecturer, cytologist, and phycologist who worked with lichen photobionts. In 1994, Tschermak-Woess was awarded the Acharius Medal for her lifetime contributions to lichenology. She had a Festschrift dedicated to her in 1988, in the journal Plant Systematics and Evolution (volume 158, pages 73–340). Lichen taxa that have been named after Tschermak-Woess include the genus Woessia and the species Asterochloris woessiae.

== Biography ==
Tschermak-Woess studied botany and chemistry at the University of Vienna. In 1948 she began her career as a cytologist with Lothar Geitler. From 1971 to 1985 she was a professor of botany (cytology and genetics) at the University of Vienna. Noted for her excellent technique with the light microscope, she discovered the presence of polytene chromosomes in plants. She published several studies about the interactions between mycobionts and phycobionts as well as studies on haustoria. Her field of work eventually shifted from cytology, karyology and the biology of the lichen symbiosis to epiphytic algae and lichen algae, especially their biology and systematics. Tschermak-Woess published more than 100 scientific papers, including a book and the overview on lichen algae in Margalith Galun's Handbook of Lichenology (1988). Tschermak-Woess made a significant contribution to the understanding of lichen algae, and she circumscribed the genera Asterochloris, Dilabifilum. Elliptochloris, and Hemochloris. About a third of Tschermak-Woess's publications are about cytology; frequent topics in this area include population cytogenetic studies on Allium paniculatum, and the processes of endomitosis and endopolyploidy in flowering plants.

== Selected works ==
- Tschermak-Woess, Elisabeth (1999). "Life cycle and supplementary comments on the light microscopic morphology of Nannochioris eucaryota". Plant Biology. 1 (2): 214–218. doi:10.1111/j.1438-8677.1999.tb00246.x.
- Tschermakwoess, E (1995). "Dictyochloropsis splendida (chlorophyta), the correct phycobiont of and the high degree of selectivity or specificity involved". The Lichenologist. 27: 169–187. doi:10.1016/S0024-2829(05)80016-7.

== See also ==
- Category:Taxa named by Elisabeth Tschermak-Woess
