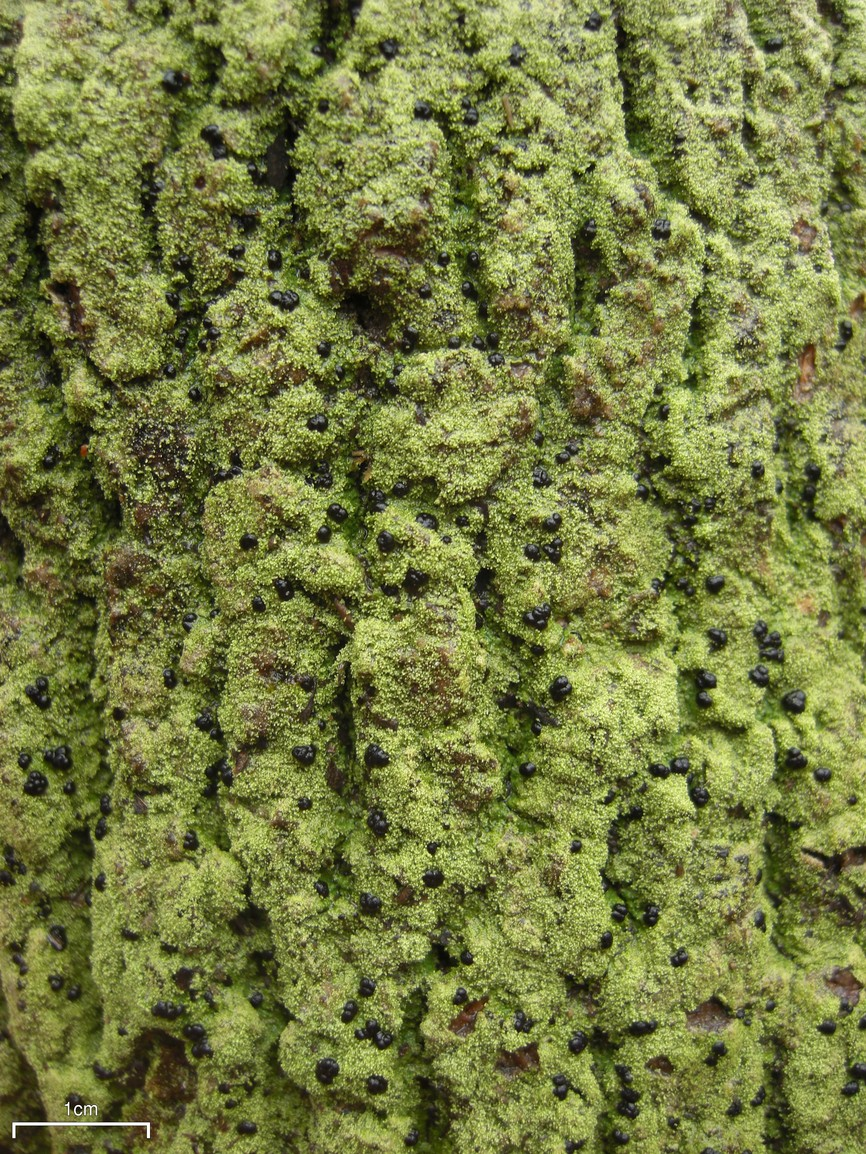
- Bacidia schweinitzii in Augusta, Georgia, USA

Scientific classification
- Kingdom: Fungi
- Division: Ascomycota
- Class: Lecanoromycetes
- Order: Lecanorales
- Family: Ramalinaceae
- Genus: Bacidia; De Not. (1846)

Type species
- Bacidia rosella (Pers.) De Not. (1846)

Synonyms
- Sporacestra A.Massal. (1860); Byssopsora A.Massal. (1861); Thalloidima sect. Psorella Müll.Arg. (1888); Psorella (Müll.Arg.) Müll.Arg. (1894); Urophora Sommerf. ex Arnold (1899); Bacidiomyces Cif. & Tomas. (1953); Lichingoldia D.Hawksw. & Poelt (1986); Woessia D.Hawksw. & Poelt (1986)

= Bacidia =

Genus of lichen-forming fungi

Bacidia is a genus of lichen-forming fungi in the family Ramalinaceae. These lichens are characterised by their crustose growth form, distinctive club-shaped reproductive structures called apothecia that contain long, needle-like spores, and their symbiotic partnership with green algae. Bacidia species typically grow on various substrates including tree bark, rock surfaces, and occasionally soil, and are distinguished from related genera by their specific spore characteristics and internal structures.

== Taxonomy ==
The genus was circumscribed by Giuseppe De Notaris in 1846. In his original description, De Notaris distinguished Bacidia from the closely related genus Biatora based on several key characteristics. He noted that Bacidia species have apothecia (fruiting bodies) that are typically pink or reddish, or sometimes nearly cinnamon-coloured, with margins that persist throughout all developmental stages and are surrounded by a distinct cartilaginous border. The spores are rod-shaped with eight cells separated by cross-walls (septa), and are hyaline (transparent) and two-celled. De Notaris described the thallus as crustose, granular, and often effuse (spreading loosely), ranging from whitish to greyish-brown in colour. He included two species in his original circumscription: Bacidia rosella (the type species) and Bacidia carneola.

== Description ==
Bacidia is characterised by its crustose (crust-like) growth form. The main body (thallus) of these lichens typically appears as a thin layer that can be smooth, cracked, warty, or granular in texture. The thallus may sometimes develop specialised structures such as soredia (powdery propagules), isidia (small outgrowths), or tiny scale-like features. Its colour usually ranges from whitish to pale green, greenish-grey, pale grey, or fawn.

Like all lichens, Bacidia species represent a symbiotic partnership with algae. Their photobiont (algal partner) belongs to the chlorococcoid group, featuring spherical or broadly oval-shaped cells. The fungal component produces distinctive reproductive structures called apothecia, which are disc-shaped and typically measure up to 1 mm across (occasionally reaching 1.3 mm). These apothecia sit directly on the thallus surface and can vary from flat to strongly convex in shape and come in various colours.

The internal structure of the apothecia is diagnostic for the genus. They lack a thalline margin (an outer layer containing algal cells) but possess a true exciple – a protective layer composed of tightly packed, thick-walled fungal threads (hyphae) that have narrow internal channels and become gel-like. When stained with iodine, the spore-producing layer (hymenium) turns blue. Within this layer are specialised cells called paraphyses, which are rarely branched and often have swollen tips.

The spore-producing cells (asci) are club-shaped to cylindrical-club-shaped and each contains eight ascospores. The spores themselves are colourless and typically long and narrow (filiform to needle-like) or S-shaped, though some species produce more cylindrical to spindle-shaped spores. These spores usually have three or more cross-walls (septa) when mature.

The genus also produces asexual reproductive structures called pycnidia, which can be sunken into or sitting on the thallus surface. These structures produce colourless spores (conidia) of various shapes, which may sometimes have cross-walls. When tested with common chemical spot tests used in lichen identification, the thallus shows no reaction, though the reproductive structures may contain various pigments.

== Species ==
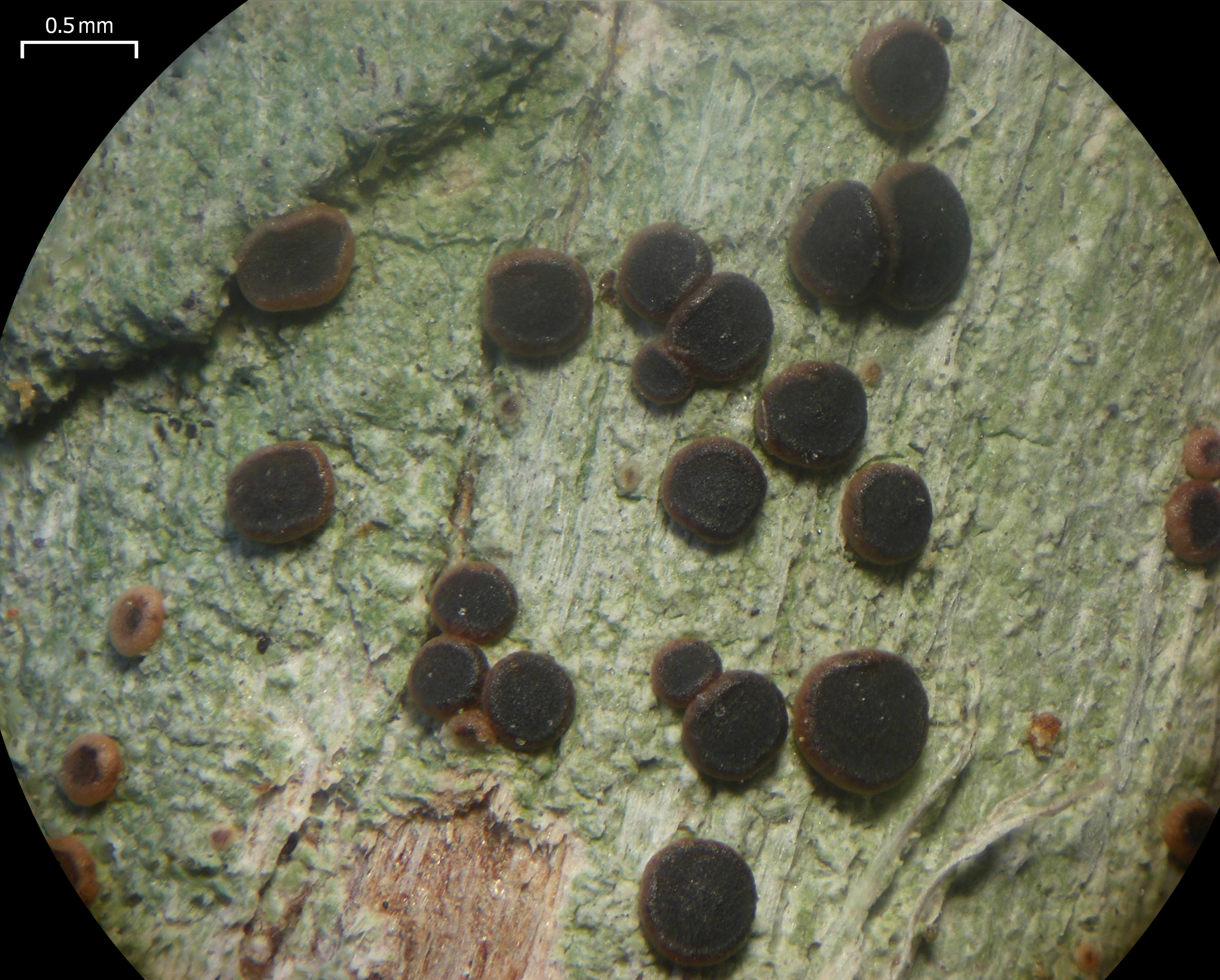
Closeup of Bacidia heterochroa

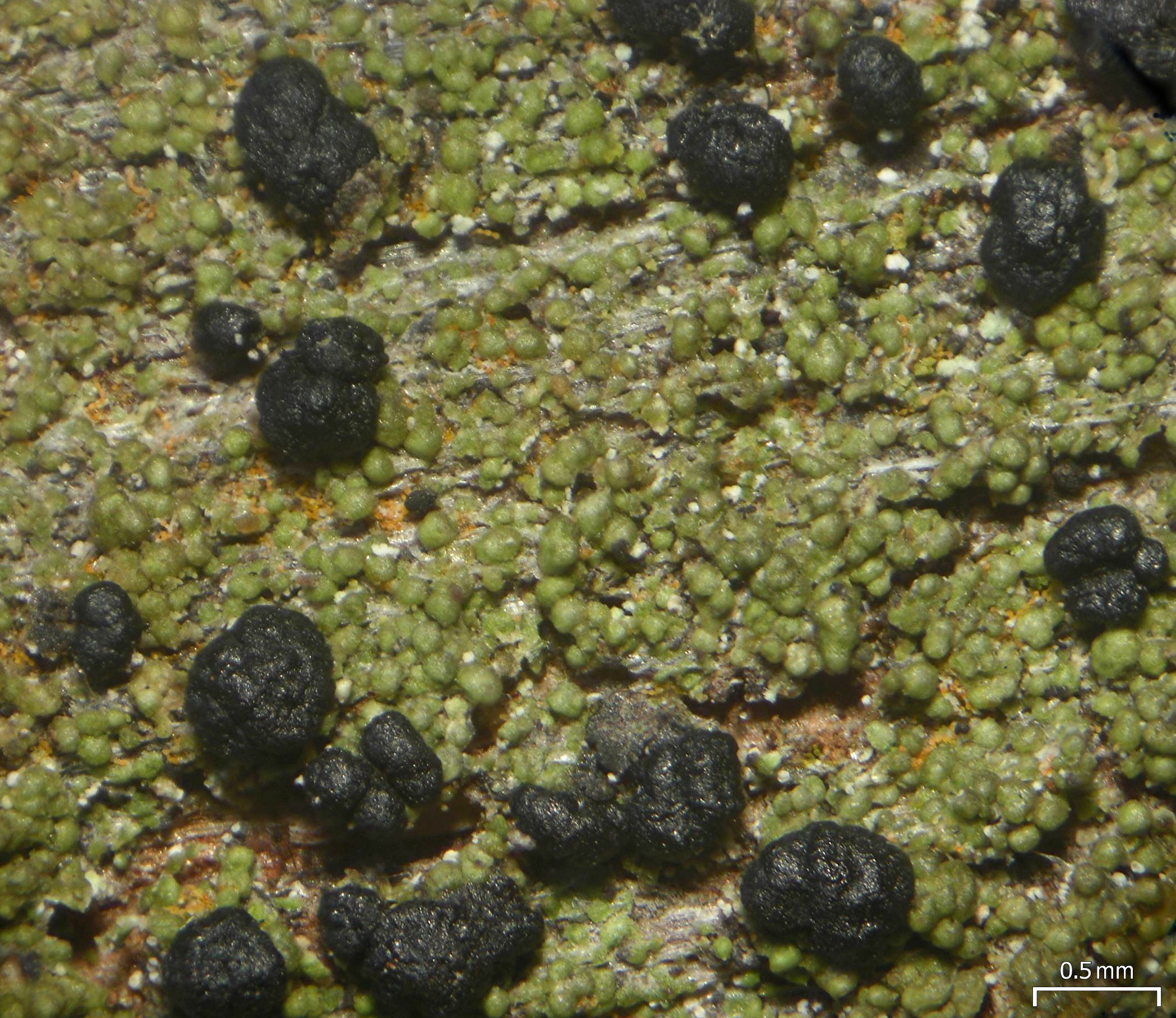
Closeup of Bacidia schweinitzii

- Bacidia absistens (Nyl.) Arnold (1871)
- Bacidia albogranulosa Malíček, Palice, Vondrák & Kukwa (2018)
- Bacidia alutacea (Kremp.) Zahlbr. (1926)
- Bacidia arceutina (Ach.) Arnold (1869)
- Bacidia areolata Gerasimova & A.Beck (2018) – Russian Far East
- Bacidia beckhausii Körb. (1860)
- Bacidia biatorina (Körb.) Vain. (1922)
- Bacidia brigitteae Kantvilas (2017) – Kangaroo Island
- Bacidia caesiovirens S.Ekman & Holien (1995) – western Europe
- Bacidia campbelliae (Müll.Arg.) Zahlbr. (1926)
- Bacidia carneoglauca (Nyl.) A.L.Sm. (1911)
- Bacidia chrysocolla Olech, Czarnota & Llop (2009)
- Bacidia circumspecta (Norrl. & Nyl.) Malme (1895)
- Bacidia conspicua (C.Knight) Zahlbr. (1926)
- Bacidia convexa (Müll.Arg.) Zahlbr. (1926)
- Bacidia cornea (With.) A.Massal. (1852)
- Bacidia coruscans S.Ekman (2004)
- Bacidia curvispora Coppins & Fryday (2007)
- Bacidia cylindrophora (Taylor) Kistenich, Timdal, Bendiksby & S.Ekman (2018)
- Bacidia depriestiana Lendemer & Keepers (2021)
- Bacidia effusa Trevis. (1856)
- Bacidia ekmaniana R.C.Harris, Ladd & Lendemer (2016)
- Bacidia elongata Gerasimova & A.Beck (2018) – Russian Far East
- Bacidia entocosmensis (C.Knight) Zahlbr. (1926)
- Bacidia entodiaphana (C.Knight) Zahlbr. (1926)
- Bacidia fellhaneroides van den Boom (2018)
- Bacidia fluminensis (Malme) M.Cáceres & Lücking (2007)
- Bacidia fratruelis (Müll.Arg.) Zahlbr. (1926)
- Bacidia friesiana (Hepp) Körb. (1860)
- Bacidia furfurella (Müll.Arg.) Zahlbr. (1926)
- Bacidia fuscoviridis (Anzi) Lettau (1912)
- Bacidia gallowayi Coppins & Fryday (2007)
- Bacidia granosa (Tuck.) Zahlbr. (1926)
- Bacidia gullahgeechee Lendemer (2018) – United States
- Bacidia heterochroa (Müll.Arg.) Zahlbr. (1926)
- Bacidia herbarum (Stizenb.) Arnold (1865)
- Bacidia iberica Aragón & I.Martínez (2003) – Spain
- Bacidia johnstoniae Elix (2009)
- Bacidia kekesiana R.C.Harris (2009)
- Bacidia killiasii (Hepp) D.Hawksw. (1983)
- Bacidia kurilensis Gerasimova, A.Ezhkin & A.Beck (2018) – Russian Far East
- Bacidia laurocerasi (Delise ex Duby) Zahlbr. (1926)
- Bacidia leucocarpa C.Knight (1880)
- Bacidia lithophila Kantvilas (2018) – Australia
- Bacidia littoralis Kantvilas (2018) – Australia
- Bacidia lividofusca (Nyl.) Zahlbr. (1926)
- Bacidia lividonigrans (Müll.Arg.) Zahlbr. (1926)
- Bacidia lobarica Printzen & Tønsberg (2007) – United States
- Bacidia maccarthyi Kantvilas (2018) – Australia
- Bacidia macquariensis C.W.Dodge (1968)
- Bacidia macrospora (C.Knight) Zahlbr. (1926)
- Bacidia marina Fryday (2019) – Falkland Islands
- Bacidia microphyllina (Tuck.) Riddle (1923)
- Bacidia millegrana (Taylor) Zahlbr. (1888)
- Bacidia modestula (Müll.Arg.) Zahlbr. (1926)
- Bacidia multicarpa van den Boom (2018)
- Bacidia multiseptata (Shirley) Zahlbr. (1926)
- Bacidia pallida Darb. (1912)
- Bacidia paramedialis M.Brand, Coppins, van den Boom & Sérus. (2009)
- Bacidia phyllopsoropsis R.C.Harris & Lendemer (2006)
- Bacidia placodioides Coppins & Fryday (2007)
- Bacidia polychroa (Th.Fr.) Körb. (1860)
- Bacidia prasinata (Zahlbr.) Coppins (1983)
- Bacidia pruinata Fryday (2019) – Falkland Islands
- Bacidia punica Llop (2010)
- Bacidia purpurans R.C.Harris, Ladd & Lendemer (2016)
- Bacidia pycnidiata Czarnota & Coppins (2006) – central Europe
- Bacidia quadrilocularis Zahlbr. (1926)
- Bacidia raffii (Stirt.) Zahlbr. (1926)
- Bacidia rhodocardia (Müll.Arg.) Zahlbr. (1926)
- Bacidia rosella (Pers.) De Not. (1846)
- Bacidia rosellizans S.Ekman (2009)
- Bacidia rubella (Hoffm.) A.Massal. (1852)
- Bacidia rudis (Müll.Arg.) Zahlbr. (1926)
- Bacidia sachalinensis Gerasimova, A.Ezhkin & A.Beck (2018) – Russian Far East
- Bacidia schweinitzii (Fr. ex Tuck.) A.Schneid. (1898)
- Bacidia scopulicola (Nyl.) A.L.Sm. (1911)
- Bacidia septosior (Nyl.) Zahlbr. (1926)
- Bacidia sigmospora van den Boom & Alvarado (2019)
- Bacidia sipmanii M.Brand, Coppins, van den Boom & Sérus. (2009)
- Bacidia sorediata Lendemer & R.C.Harris (2016)
- Bacidia squamellosa (S.Ekman) Coppins & Aptroot (2008)
- Bacidia subareolata A.H.Ekanayaka & K.D.Hyde (2019)
- Bacidia subproposita (Müll.Arg.) Zahlbr. (1926)
- Bacidia subturgidula (Nyl.) Zahlbr. (1926)
- Bacidia superbula (Müll.Arg.) Zahlbr. (1926)
- Bacidia superula (Nyl.) Hellb. (1896)
- Bacidia surinamensis van den Boom (2018)
- Bacidia termitophila Aptroot & M.Cáceres (2014)
- Bacidia thiersiana Lendemer (2020) – United States
- Bacidia thyrrenica Llop (2007)
- Bacidia vagula (Vain.) Zahlbr. (1926)
- Bacidia vallatula (Jatta) Kantvilas (1993)
- Bacidia veneta S.Ekman (2004)
- Bacidia vinicolor (Stirt.) Zahlbr. (1926)
- Bacidia viridescens (A.Massal.) Hellb. (1871)

== Gallery ==
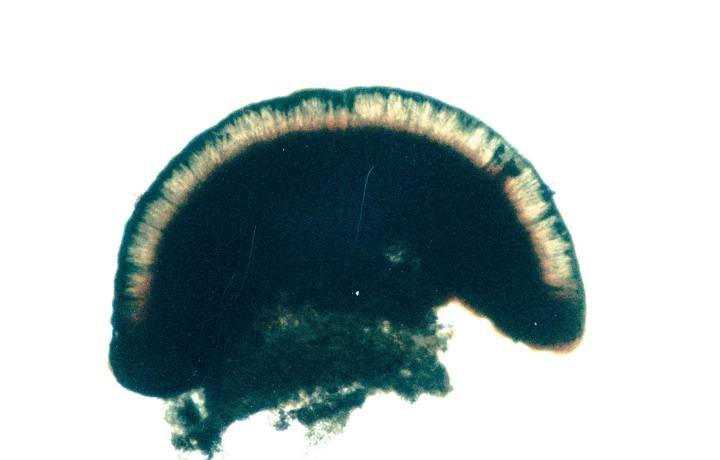
Cross section of an apothecium of B. schweinitzii, photographed through a compound microscope (x1000), showing a green epihymenium and a dark reddish-brown hypothecium

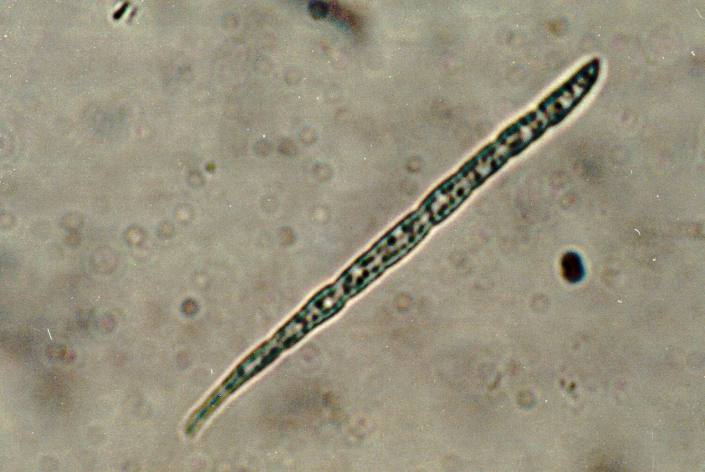
Acicular spore of B. schweinitzii, 65 x 6 micrometres, photographed through a compound microscope, x1000
