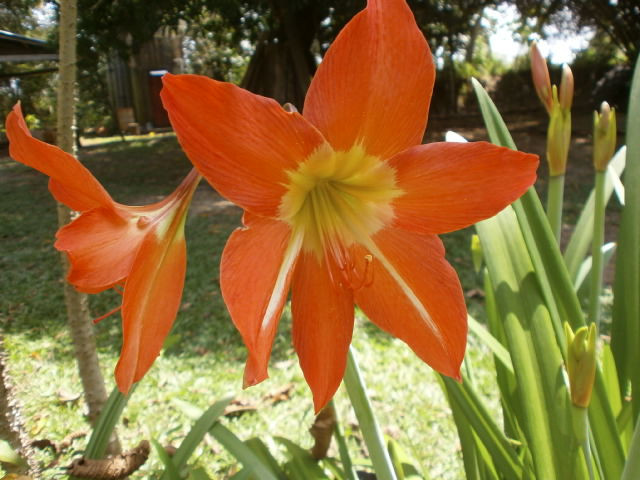

Scientific classification
- Kingdom: Plantae
- Clade: Tracheophytes
- Clade: Angiosperms
- Clade: Monocots
- Order: Asparagales
- Family: Amaryllidaceae
- Subfamily: Amaryllidoideae
- Genus: Hippeastrum
- Species: H. ferreyrae

Binomial name
- Hippeastrum ferreyrae (Traub) Gereau & Brako

Synonyms
- Amaryllis ferreyrae Traub

= Hippeastrum ferreyrae =

Species of flowering plant

Hippeastrum ferreyrae is a flowering perennial herbaceous bulbous plant, in the family Amaryllidaceae, native to Peru.

== Description ==
Hippeastrum ferreyrae is considered an endangered species according to the IUCN (1997).

== Taxonomy ==
The species was first described and named by Hamilton Paul Traub in 1950 as Amaryllis ferreyrae. It was transferred to the genus Hippeastrum by Roy Emile Gereau and Lois Brako in 1993.

== Sources ==
- The Plant List (2012). "Hippeastrum ferreyrae".
- GBIF: Hippeastrum ferreyrae
