= Phyllopsora glaucella =

Scientific classification
- Kingdom: Fungi
- Division: Ascomycota
- Class: Lecanoromycetes
- Order: Lecanorales
- Family: Ramalinaceae
- Genus: Phyllopsora
- Species: P. glaucella

Binomial name
- Phyllopsora glaucella (Vain.) Timdal (2008)

Synonyms
- Lecidea breviuscula var. glaucella Vain. (1926); Phyllopsora corallina var. glaucella (Vain.) Brako (1989)

Species of lichen

Phyllopsora glaucella is a species of squamulose (scaly) lichen in the family Ramalinaceae. The lichen forms mats of tiny green scales with small brown fruiting bodies and was first described from Mexican collections in 1926. It is distributed across tropical and subtropical America, ranging from Florida through the West Indies to Argentina.

== Taxonomy ==
The lichen was first scientifically described by the Finnish lichenologist Edvard August Vainio in 1926, as a variety of the species Lecidea breviuscula. Lois Brako transferred the taxon to Phyllopsora in 1989 (still with varietal status). Einar Timdal promoted it to full species status in 2008. The holotype originates from Mirador, Veracruz, Mexico.

Timdal separated P. glaucella from the P. corallina complex on both chemistry and morphology: the type contains the lichen substances vicanicin and norvicanicin, and it differs in squamule size, cortex thickness, isidia form and attachment, and ascospore size. He found no trace of argopsin in the holotype and noted that a Peruvian specimen previously labeled as P. corallina var. ochroxantha (chemical strain III) in fact contains vicanicin and norvicanicin and belongs to P. glaucella.

== Description ==
The thallus (lichen body) of P. glaucella forms an effuse mat of tiny green squamules (minute, leaf-like scales) up to about 0.5 mm wide. Squamules begin scattered and later become contiguous or overlapping; they are rounded to somewhat elongated, shallowly notched to incised, flat to slightly convex, and edged by a faintly hairy margin. A prothallus (a peripheral rim of fungal tissue) is well developed and reddish brown. Isidia (minute outgrowths that break off to spread the lichen vegetatively) are scattered to common, arise along squamule margins, and are typically long and simple. The outer "skin" (upper cortex) is relatively thick (about 25–30 μm) and lacks crystals. The internal tissue of the lichen, the medulla, contains crystals that dissolve in potassium hydroxide solution and give negative standard spot test reactions (PD−, K−).

Fruiting bodies (apothecia) are common, small (to about 1 mm), and medium brown. They range from round and flat when young to irregular and strongly convex later; the margin is the same color or slightly paler and often finely hairy. Internal tissues are pale and lack crystals. Spores are narrowly ellipsoid, non-septate, and about 6.5–9 × about 2.5 μm. No pycnidia (asexual fruiting structures) were observed in this species. The main substances are vicanicin and norvicanicin.

== Habitat and distribution ==
Phyllopsora glaucella is known from Florida (USA), Mexico, the West Indies, and South America south to Argentina; Timdal reported it as new to Peru. A Peruvian collection comes from Department of San Martín (Cerro Blanco) at roughly 1,200 m elevation.
