= Phyllopsora nemoralis =

Scientific classification
- Kingdom: Fungi
- Division: Ascomycota
- Class: Lecanoromycetes
- Order: Lecanorales
- Family: Ramalinaceae
- Genus: Phyllopsora
- Species: P. nemoralis

Binomial name
- Phyllopsora nemoralis Timdal & Krog (2001)
- Holotype: Forêt de Bélouve, Mauritius

Species of lichen

Phyllopsora nemoralis is a species of lichen-forming fungus in the family Ramalinaceae. This crustose lichen is characterized by its spreading thallus that initially forms small areolae but later develops predominantly short, thin isidia, and contains argopsin as its main secondary metabolite. Originally discovered in woodland habitats across Tanzania, La Réunion, and South Africa at elevations ranging from 600 to 2,010 metres, it has since been found in temperate regions of Assam, India.

== Taxonomy ==
Phyllopsora nemoralis was formally described by the lichenologists Einar Timdal and Hildur Krog. The type specimen was collected in La Réunion, in Forêt de Bélouve, along a track from Gîte de Bébour to a viewpoint, at an elevation of 1,500–1,550 metres. This holotype specimen is preserved in the herbarium collection under the reference code Krog & Timdal RE23/93.

The species is distinguished from related taxa by several characteristics. It differs from P. furfuracea by forming more richly branched structures for vegetative reproduction, having a darker hypothecium (the tissue beneath the spore-producing layer), and containing specific secondary metabolites. It can also be distinguished from the European species P. rosei by its lack of a white prothallus and its chemical composition. P. malcolmi differs in being squamulose (having small, overlapping scales) and having different metabolite proportions.

== Description ==
Phyllopsora nemoralis has a spreading, crustose thallus that begins as small areolae (island-like segments) when young, but later develops to consist primarily of isidia (small, finger-like vegetative reproductive structures). The initial growth layer (prothallus) is poorly developed and ranges from white to reddish-brown in colour. The areolae are small, with notched edges, and range from pale green to medium green. They may be smooth or slightly fuzzy when young and are not clearly distinct from the isidia. The isidia are numerous, thin, short, and typically unbranched or rarely branched.

The upper cortex (outer protective layer) is classified as type 1-2, measures 15–25 μm in thickness, and contains crystals that dissolve in potassium hydroxide solution, producing an orange-red colour. An algal layer fills the inner part of the areolae and isidia, with few or no crystals present in this layer.

Spore-producing structures (apothecia) are rare in Phyllopsora nemoralis; if present they measure up to 2.5 mm in diameter. They are rounded to irregular in shape, slightly convex, and medium brown in colour, with an indistinct margin that is the same colour or slightly paler. The outer protective layer of the apothecium (excipulum), the tissue beneath the spore-producing layer (hypothecium), and the tissue above it (epithecium) range from pale brown to colourless. The reproductive spores (ascospores) are narrowly elliptical or shaped like a spindle to short needle, simple (without internal divisions), and measure 7.5–12.5 by 2.5–3 μm based on a sample of 30 spores. Asexual reproductive structures (pycnidia) were not observed in the examined specimens.

Chemically, P. nemoralis contains argopsin as its main secondary metabolite, with atranorin present in smaller amounts.

== Habitat and distribution ==
Phyllopsora nemoralis grows in woodland habitats across several regions in Africa and in Asia. It has been documented at specific elevation ranges in its known distribution range. In Tanzania, it has been collected in well-lit woodland sites at elevations between 1,750–1,800 metres, specifically in the Southern Highlands Province and Iringa Urban District at the Mdandu escarpment. In Réunion, the species has been found at elevations between 1,550–2,010 metres, including locations along the road towards Piton de la Fournaise, below Nez de Boeuf, and at Forêt de Bélouve. In South Africa, collections have been made in the Western Cape at Caledon, Riviersonderend Berge, in a Stoebe forest at an elevation of 600 metres.

The species has also been recorded in India, where it was discovered in temperate areas in the state of Assam at an elevation of 1,014 metres. This finding considerably expanded the known geographical range of the species beyond its previously documented African localities.
