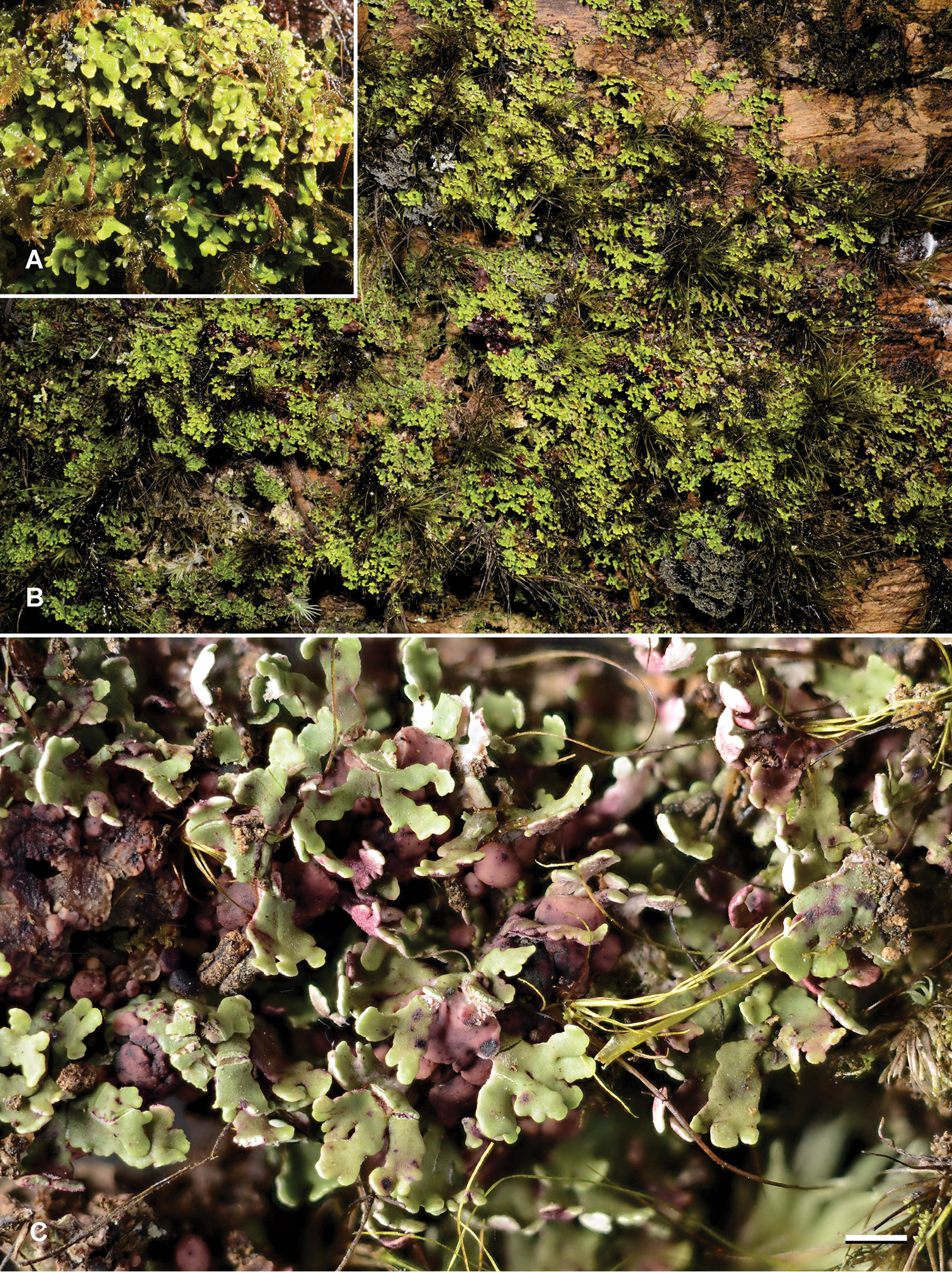
- Krogia macrophylla A & B in the field; C herbarium photograph of holotype. Scale bar=1 mm

Scientific classification
- Domain: Eukaryota
- Kingdom: Fungi
- Division: Ascomycota
- Class: Lecanoromycetes
- Order: Lecanorales
- Family: Ramalinaceae
- Genus: Krogia; Timdal (2002)

Type species
- Krogia coralloides Timdal (2002)

Species
- K. antillarum K. borneensis K. coralloides K. isidiata K. macrophylla K. microphylla

= Krogia =

Genus of lichens

Krogia is a genus of corticolous lichens in the family Ramalinaceae. It occurs in tropical humid forests and rainforests. The genus was circumscribed by Norwegian lichenologist Einar Timdal in 2002, with Krogia coralloides assigned as the type species. These tiny lichens form distinctive coral-like cushions on tree bark, with their scale-like lobes (squamules) divided into finger-like branches that give them a miniature branching appearance. The genus is quite rare, with only six known species found scattered across mountain forests from the Caribbean to Southeast Asia and the Pacific islands.

== Taxonomy ==
The Norwegian lichenologist Einar Timdal circumscribed Krogia in 2002 on the basis of the Mauritian type species Krogia coralloides; the genus name honours his long-time colleague Hildur Krog. Timdal placed it close to Phyllopsora but pointed out several decisive anatomical differences: the ascus wall shows only a faint amyloid reaction, the thread-like ascospores are barely 1 micrometre (μm) thick and often coil inside the ascus, the thallus lacks a true medulla yet possesses a distinct lower cortex, and the chemistry is dominated by boninic acid rather than the depsidones common in Phyllopsora. Because these characters do not fit comfortably into the Bacidiaceae concept then in use, Timdal left the familial placement open, although subsequent workers have treated Krogia within the Ramalinaceae (sensu lato) alongside Phyllopsora.

The genus remained monospecific for several years, but concerted collecting in tropical cloud forests has since uncovered additional taxa. Krogia antillarum was described from the Greater and Lesser Antilles in 2009, differing from the type in squamule shape and secondary chemistry; K. microphylla followed in 2011 from a single Dominican cloud-forest site, its epithet referring to its minute lobes. A phylogeny-guided revision in 2018 added three Paleotropical species—K. borneensis (Borneo) plus K. isidiata and K. macrophylla (both New Caledonia)—raising the current total to six. All are corticolous inhabitants of humid, montane forests and appear to be rare, each known from only a handful of localities.

Molecular data place the six Krogia species in a well-supported clade that is sister to Phyllopsora sensu stricto within the Ramalinaceae, confirming that the unique ascus and chemical profile evolved within that family rather than indicating a separate lineage. The genus can therefore be regarded as a diminutive tropical branch of the otherwise mainly epiphytic Phyllopsora complex.

== Description ==
Krogia forms minute, coral-like cushions composed of numerous overlapping scale-lobes. Each squamule is at most about 1 mm wide but is divided into forked, finger-like branches barely 0.1 mm across that stand slightly upright and interlock, giving the thallus a finely branched appearance. The surface is grey-green and smooth, yet it is often flecked with tiny crimson patches that instantaneously turn violet-purple when touched with potassium hydroxide solution (the standard K test). No powdery reproductive granules (soredia) or wart-like outgrowths (isidia) are produced. The underside is pale brown to whitish, showing a thin lower "skin" (cortex), while a distinct prothallus (margin of fungal strands) is absent.

A thin, gel-like upper cortex—essentially a protective outer layer of tightly cemented fungal threads about 15–30 μm thick—covers the upper surface; unlike many lichens it bears neither crystalline deposits nor traces of embedded algal cells. Just beneath this lies a narrow green algal zone, roughly 30–50 μm deep, whose photobiont cells are only about 10 μm in diameter and are sprinkled with microscopic crystals that dissolve in the K test. Krogia lacks a true medulla (the loose inner fungal layer common in many other lichens), but it does have a second, pale lower cortex up to 30 μm thick where the fungal filaments are longer-celled and loosely bound. Chemical analyses show the thallus to contain boninic acid—an uncommon orcinol meta-depside in this group—together with a closely related compound; under ultraviolet light the thallus therefore fluoresces white.

The lichen reproduces with small, pale brown to medium-brown disc-like apothecia (fruiting bodies) that sit directly on the squamules and seldom exceed 1 mm in diameter. Their margin is inconspicuous and bears minute projecting fibrils at the base. Internally, the hymenium (spore-bearing tissue) is low, only about 40 μm high, and stains weakly with iodine, while the surrounding tissues are densely gelatinised. Each narrowly club-shaped ascus produces eight exceedingly slender, curved ascospores, 22–30 μm long and roughly 1 μm wide, that often coil in a loose spiral and may show one to three faint partition lines. Asexual spores (pycnidia) have not been observed in this genus. These distinctive thread-like spores, coupled with the absence of a medulla and the presence of a lower cortex, separate Krogia from its superficially similar relative Phyllopsora.

== Species ==
As of June 2025, Species Fungorum (in the Catalogue of Life) accept six species of Krogia:

- Krogia antillarum Timdal (2009) – West Indies
- Krogia borneensis Kistenich & Timdal (2018) – Borneo
- Krogia coralloides Timdal (2002) – Mauritius
- Krogia isidiata Kistenich & Timdal (2018) – New Caledonia
- Krogia macrophylla Kistenich & Timdal (2018) – New Caledonia
- Krogia microphylla Timdal (2011) – Dominican Republic
