= Phyllopsora catervisorediata =

Scientific classification
- Kingdom: Fungi
- Division: Ascomycota
- Class: Lecanoromycetes
- Order: Lecanorales
- Family: Ramalinaceae
- Genus: Phyllopsora
- Species: P. catervisorediata

Binomial name
- Phyllopsora catervisorediata G.K.Mishra, Upreti & Nayaka (2011)

Species of lichen-forming fungus

Phyllopsora catervisorediata is a species of lichen-forming fungus in the family Ramalinaceae. It was described as new in 2011 by Gaurav Kumar Mishra, Dalip Kumar Upreti, and Sanjeeva Nayaka. It is known from its type locality in the Western Himalayas of India (Uttarakhand, Bageshwar district, on the route to Pindari Glacier), where it was found growing on bark in moist, humid forest at roughly 2,700–3,200 m elevation. The species epithet refers to the Latin caterva ('a group' or 'heap'), alluding to the way the soredia occur in clustered heaps.

The thallus is squamulose (made of small, scale-like squamules) and closely attached to the substrate, with rounded to elongate squamules about 0.1–0.5 mm wide that may become slightly ascending. The upper surface is smooth and pale green to yellowish, and the margins produce farinose soredia (powdery propagules) that build up into heaps. The prothallus (a thin border of hyphae) is indistinct. No apothecia or pycnidia have been observed. In terms of chemical spot tests, the thallus is K+ (yellow) and C−/KC−/PD−; thin-layer chromatography detected atranorin. It resembles P. soralifera in having sorediate squamules and a type 2 cortex (using standard cortex type terminology used for genus Phyllopsora), but differs in its non-capitate soredia and in having lichen substances present.
