= Phyllopsora himalayensis =

Scientific classification
- Kingdom: Fungi
- Division: Ascomycota
- Class: Lecanoromycetes
- Order: Lecanorales
- Family: Ramalinaceae
- Genus: Phyllopsora
- Species: P. himalayensis

Binomial name
- Phyllopsora himalayensis G.K.Mishra, Upreti & Nayaka (2011)

Species of lichen-forming fungus

Phyllopsora himalayensis is a species of bark-dwelling lichen in the family Ramalinaceae. It was described as a new species in 2011 by Gaurav Kumar Mishra, Dalip Kumar Upreti, and Sanjeeva Nayaka. It occurs in temperate parts of the Himalayas in northern India (recorded from Himachal Pradesh and Uttarakhand), where it grows on the bark of rough-barked trees in moist, humid forest at about 1,500–3,140 m elevation. The species epithet refers to the Himalayas, the type locality.

The thallus is squamulose (made of small, scale-like squamules) with a thin white prothallus. The squamules are closely attached, rounded to elongate, sometimes overlapping, and about 0.1–0.5 mm wide, with a smooth pale green to yellow upper surface. It produces mostly globular isidia (minute outgrowths used in vegetative spread), and the cortex and medulla contain crystals that dissolve in potassium hydroxide solution (K). Apothecia are common, up to 2.0 mm across, with a brown to dark brown disc. The ascospores are hyaline, simple, narrowly ellipsoid to fusiform, 5–10 × 1–2.5 μm. Pycnidia are also common (orange to brown and immersed), producing straight, rod-shaped conidia 6–12 × 1–1.5 μm. In terms of chemical spot tests, the thallus is K+ (yellow) and C−/KC−/PD−, with atranorin detected by thin-layer chromatography.
