= Krogia microphylla =

Scientific classification
- Kingdom: Fungi
- Division: Ascomycota
- Class: Lecanoromycetes
- Order: Lecanorales
- Family: Ramalinaceae
- Genus: Krogia
- Species: K. microphylla

Binomial name
- Krogia microphylla Timdal (2011)

Species of lichen

Krogia microphylla is a rare species of corticolous (bark-dwelling), squamulose (scaly) lichen in the family Ramalinaceae. It was discovered in 2011 by the Norwegian lichenologist Einar Timdal from a single specimen collected in the cloud forests of the Dominican Republic. The lichen forms tiny, overlapping scales that create a crusty surface on tree bark, and it lacks the powdery reproductive structures found in many related species. It remains known only from its original collection site.

== Taxonomy ==
Krogia microphylla was formally described as a new species in 2011 by the Norwegian lichenologist Einar Timdal. The type specimen was collected from a cloud forest in El Seibo Province at an altitude of about 450 m (1,480 ft). At the time, it was the third member of Krogia, a small, bark-dwelling genus of subtropical rainforest lichens that otherwise contained K. coralloides from Mauritius and K. antillarum from the Lesser Antilles. The genus is recognised by its minute, leaf-like squamules and by microscopic characters—especially the weak or absent amyloid reaction in the ascus apex (tholus) and its colourless, hair-thin spores that coil inside the ascus. Within the genus, K. microphylla is distinguished by its very small scales (maturing at roughly 0.3 mm but soon forming a continuous micro-leafy crust), by the lack of any detectable secondary metabolites, and by the dark olive-brown tissue (hypothecium and inner exciple) that turns green in potassium hydroxide (K).

== Description ==
The thallus is squamulose—composed of tiny, scale-like lobes—and spreads out as an effuse crust on bark. Individual squamules are ≤ 0.3 mm wide when young but rapidly merge into a seamless, micro-leafy surface deeply cleft into irregular, about 0.1 mm lobes. These lobes are slightly upturned and overlap like roof tiles, giving the crust a shingled appearance. In the field the thallus is pale brown; herbarium specimens may show scattered orange flecks that turn purple when touched with potassium hydroxide (a K-positive anthraquinone reaction). No powdery reproductive structures such as soredia or isidia are present.

Internally, the upper cortex is thin and loosely woven, the algae fill most of each squamule, and no birefringent crystals are visible under polarised light. Apothecia are small (up to 0.7 mm across, aggregating to roughly 1 mm), with a rusty-brown disc and a slightly paler, grey-brown margin that can appear flexuous. Both the proper exciple and the hypothecium are dark olivaceous brown and respond K+ (green). The colourless hymenium contains slender, mostly unbranched paraphyses whose tips are only slightly swollen. Each club-shaped ascus holds eight hyaline, hair-like ascospores; the spores are curved, sometimes with one to three faint internal septa (pseudosepta), and measure 25–35 × about 1.0 μm. Thin-layer chromatography detected no lichen substances in K. microphylla.

== Habitat and distribution ==
Krogia microphylla is known solely from its type collection, made in January 1991 on the lower slopes (roughly 450 m altitude) of the Cordillera Oriental, Dominican Republic. The specimen grew on tree bark in a moist, shaded ravine within cloud forest vegetation, while scattered trees in adjacent pasture provided further suitable substrata. Two bark-inhabiting Phyllopsora species were collected at the same locality, documenting part of a corticolous lichen community.
