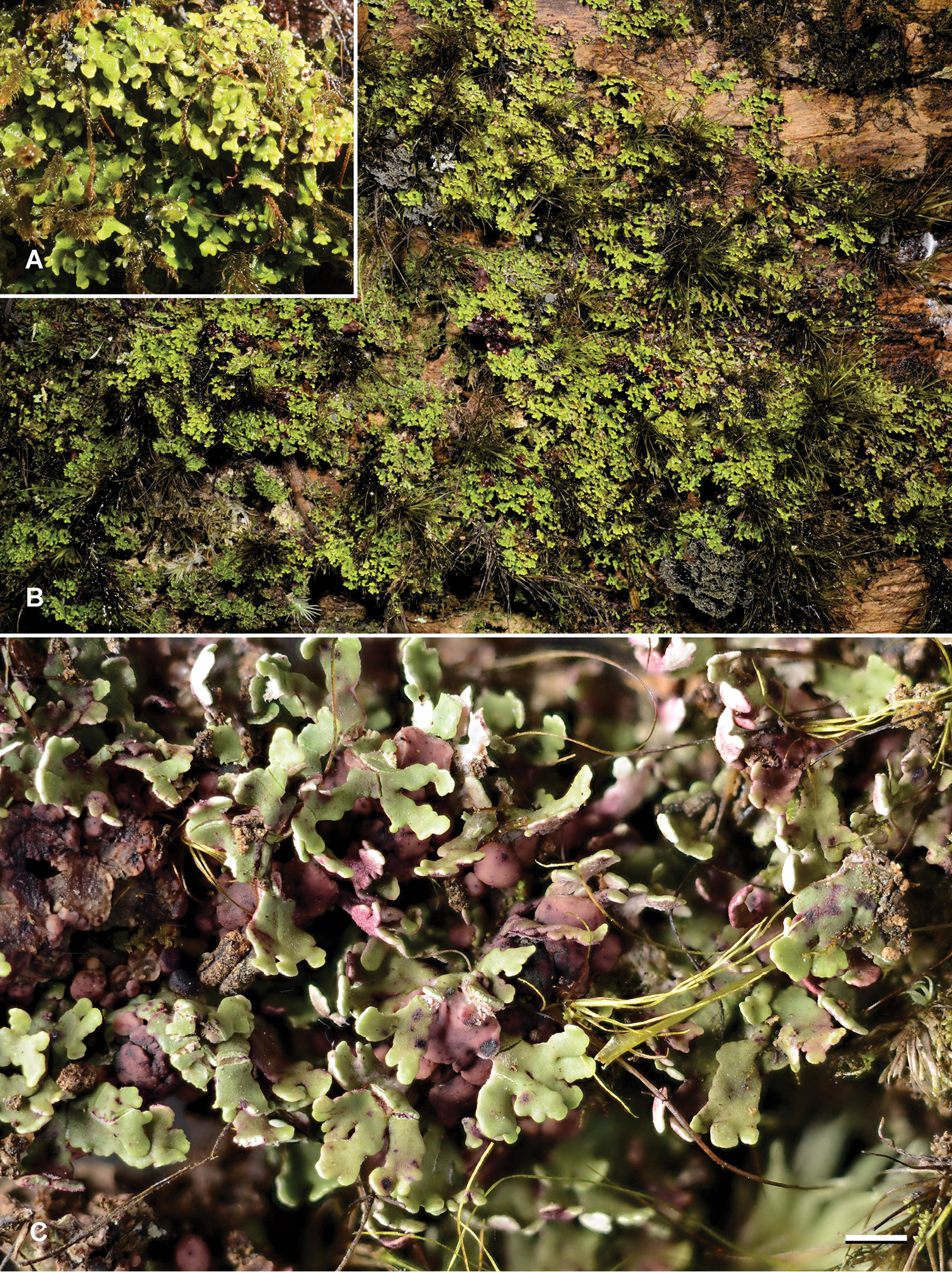
- A & B: Krogia macrophylla in the field; C: herbarium photograph of holotype. Scale bar=1 mm

Scientific classification
- Domain: Eukaryota
- Kingdom: Fungi
- Division: Ascomycota
- Class: Lecanoromycetes
- Order: Lecanorales
- Family: Ramalinaceae
- Genus: Krogia
- Species: K. macrophylla

Binomial name
- Krogia macrophylla Kistenich & Timdal (2018)

= Krogia macrophylla =

Species of lichen

Krogia macrophylla is a species of corticolous (bark-dwelling) lichen in the family Ramalinaceae. Found in New Caledonia, it was formally described as a new species in 2018. It is distinguished from other Krogia species by its relatively larger squamules and the production of a chemical substance similar to boninic acid. The species grows predominantly on tree trunks in moist or wet tropical forests.

== Taxonomy ==
Krogia macrophylla was identified and formally described in 2018 by lichenologists Sonja Kistenich and Einar Timdal. The specific epithet, macrophylla, draws reference to the lichen's notably large squamules, setting it apart from other species within genus Krogia. The type specimen was collected in New Caledonia's Mont Mou Nature Reserve (situated in the South Province), at an altitude of 1,162 m (3,812 ft).

== Description ==
The defining attribute of Krogia macrophylla is its greyish-green squamules, reaching up to 3 mm in width. These squamules are initially rounded, but later divide into lobes up to 1 mm wide. The squamules often overlap, standing upright even in their early growth phase, and display patches of purple spots. This species can occasionally produce isidia, simple or sparingly branched outgrowths attached marginally to the squamules. The apothecia are up to 1 mm in diameter, ranging from pale to medium brown, with the occasional presence of purple patches. Ascospores are arranged spirally in a spiral fashion in the ascus. They are filiform (threadlike) and curved, simple (i.e., without any internal partitions, or septa), and have dimensions of about 20–30 by 1 μm.

This lichen's chemical profile features a major unknown compound bearing similarity to boninic acid, and trace amounts of additional substances. Purple patches display a reaction when tested with a solution of potassium hydroxide (K+), deepening to a bluish-black colour.

This species shares a similar secondary chemistry to Krogia coralloides, although it lacks the boninic acid that features prominently in K. coralloides. Krogia coralloides also tends to form smaller, more linear lobes.

== Habitat and distribution ==
Krogia macrophylla has been documented in three distinct localities within New Caledonia, thriving predominantly on tree trunks in moist or wet tropical forests. The species shows a preference for shaded tree trunks that are usually dominated by epiphytic (plant-dwelling) bryophytes and/or leprarioid lichens. It is found in varying altitudes, from low-elevation rainforests to montane mist forests, all of which are based on ultramafic soils common in the southern part of Grand Terre, the main island of New Caledonia.
