= Phyllopsora atrocarpa =

Scientific classification
- Kingdom: Fungi
- Division: Ascomycota
- Class: Lecanoromycetes
- Order: Lecanorales
- Family: Ramalinaceae
- Genus: Phyllopsora
- Species: P. atrocarpa

Binomial name
- Phyllopsora atrocarpa Timdal (2008)
- Holotype: Jenaro Herrera, Peru

Species of lichen

Phyllopsora atrocarpa is a species of corticolous (bark-dwelling) squamulose lichen in the family Ramalinaceae. It forms small patches of tiny green scales on tree bark in Amazon rainforests, with each scale splitting into delicate finger-like segments that give it a finely divided appearance. The lichen produces small, nearly black fruiting bodies and is known from lowland primary forests in Peru and Brazil.

== Taxonomy ==
Phyllopsora atrocarpa was described as new to science by Einar Timdal in 2008 from the Amazon lowlands of Peru. The holotype was collected near the Jenaro Herrera research center (Loreto Department) at roughly 120–150 m (390–490 ft) elevation. Within Phyllopsora, it sits among the squamulose ("scaly") species and is set apart by a combination of very small, dissected scales and needle-shaped spores. The species epithet refers to its dark (almost black) fruiting discs.

Chemically, P. atrocarpa contains a strong dose of the lichen compound fumarprotocetraric acid together with an additional, as yet unidentified substance. Timdal contrasted it particularly with the then newly described P. lividocarpa: that species has paler gray fruiting discs and a different secondary metabolite profile.

== Description ==
The body of the lichen (the thallus) forms a thin, spreading patch of tiny green scales (called squamules) on bark. Each squamule is small to medium in size (to about 0.4 mm across), flat to slightly convex when young, then soon lifts from the bark and overlaps its neighbors. The margins are smooth (not hairy), and the tips often split into fine finger-like lobules (lacinules), giving a finely cut appearance. A very thin reddish‑brown border (prothallus) may be visible around the patch. The cottony interior (medulla) contains colorless crystals that yield an orange reaction to the PD spot test but do not react to KOH, a result consistent with fumarprotocetraric acid.

Fruiting bodies (apothecia) are present in some collections. They are small (to about 0.6 mm wide), round to slightly lobed, flat to barely convex, and dark brown to almost black, with a rim that is the same color as the disc. Under the microscope, the spore‑bearing layer sits above a gray sublayer (subhymenium), while other layers are pale and unpigmented; no crystals occur within the apothecia themselves. The spores are long and needle-like (acicular), 22.5–36.5 × 1.5–2 μm, and may show up to four faint internal partitions (pseudosepta). No asexual reproductive structures (pycnidia) were seen.

== Habitat and distribution ==
Phyllopsora atrocarpa was originally known only from the Peruvian Amazonia. All verified collections came from lowland primary rainforest near Jenaro Herrera (Loreto), where it grows on the bark of tree trunks. It was recorded from several sites within that single area, all at about 120–150 m elevation. The species appears to favor intact, humid forest. It has since been documented in Rondônia Brazil.
