= Phyllopsora glaucescens =

Scientific classification
- Kingdom: Fungi
- Division: Ascomycota
- Class: Lecanoromycetes
- Order: Lecanorales
- Family: Ramalinaceae
- Genus: Phyllopsora
- Species: P. glaucescens

Binomial name
- Phyllopsora glaucescens Timdal (2008)
- Holotype: Jenaro Herrera, Peru

Species of lichen

Phyllopsora glaucescens is a species of squamulose (scaly) bark-dwelling lichen in the family Ramalinaceae. Found in Peru, it was formally described as a new species in 2008. The lichen forms mats of large bluish-green scales up to 1.5 millimeters wide that stand upright from the bark surface. It is distinguished from related species by its distinctive color and the apparent lack of vegetative reproductive structures. The species is known only from a few sites in lowland rainforest near Jenaro Herrera in the Peruvian Amazonia, where it grows on tree bark and tree fern trunks.

== Taxonomy ==
Phyllopsora glaucescens was described as a new species by Einar Timdal in 2008 from lowland Amazonian rainforest near Jenaro Herrera, Loreto province, Peru (elevation 120–150 m). The holotype specimen lacks named secondary metabolites but shows a consistent, unidentified thin-layer chromatography spot that resembles atranorin in colour and fluorescence. The species is readily separated from others in its genus by its bluish-green thallus and absence of obvious vegetative propagules.

In a later regional study of Phyllopsora for Asia and Melanesia, a "Key to the phyllopsoroid genera" listed "'Phyllopsora' glaucescens" under a couplet diagnosing ascending squamules with labriform soralia and methyl barbatate (often with terpenoids), using quotation marks to signal a provisional or doubtful generic placement rather than a formal transfer. The study otherwise did not treat the species, and no new combination was proposed. The same work noted that Phyllopsora is polyphyletic in family-wide phylogenies, which explains the authors' caution.

== Description ==
The thallus of P. glaucescens is squamulose, forming an effuse mat of large squamules to about 1.5 mm wide that stand up from the bark even when young. The squamules are rounded to irregularly elongated, entire to deeply notched (incised), often thickened centrally by vein-like medullary tissue. The upper surface of the thallus is bluish-green, dull, and finely tomentose (a short, felted pubescence); the margins are the same color and also finely tomentose. No well-defined upper cortex is present; instead, the algal layer is covered by a thin, loose layer of hyphae with scattered crystals that dissolve in potassium hydroxide solution (the K test), and react K+ (yellow). The medulla likewise contains crystals dissolving in K (PD−, K+ yellow). Vegetative propagules are probably absent (though a few squamule tips may break into granular soredia). Apothecia, when present, are small (to roughly 0.8 mm), rounded, simple or conglomerate, weakly to strongly convex, pale to reddish brown, with an indistinct, often disappearing margin; internal apothecial tissues are pale and lack crystals, and are K−. Ascospores are long and needle-shaped (acicular), 33.5–54.5 × 1.5–2 μm, with indistinct pseudosepta. Pycnidia were not seen.

== Habitat and distribution ==
Phyllopsora glaucescens is known from a single lowland locality in the Peruvian Amazonia (Jenaro Herrera area), where it was recorded at six sites in primary rainforest, growing on tree bark and also on trunks of tree ferns. Additional material from the same general region was examined, but there are no confirmed records outside Peru in the cited study.
