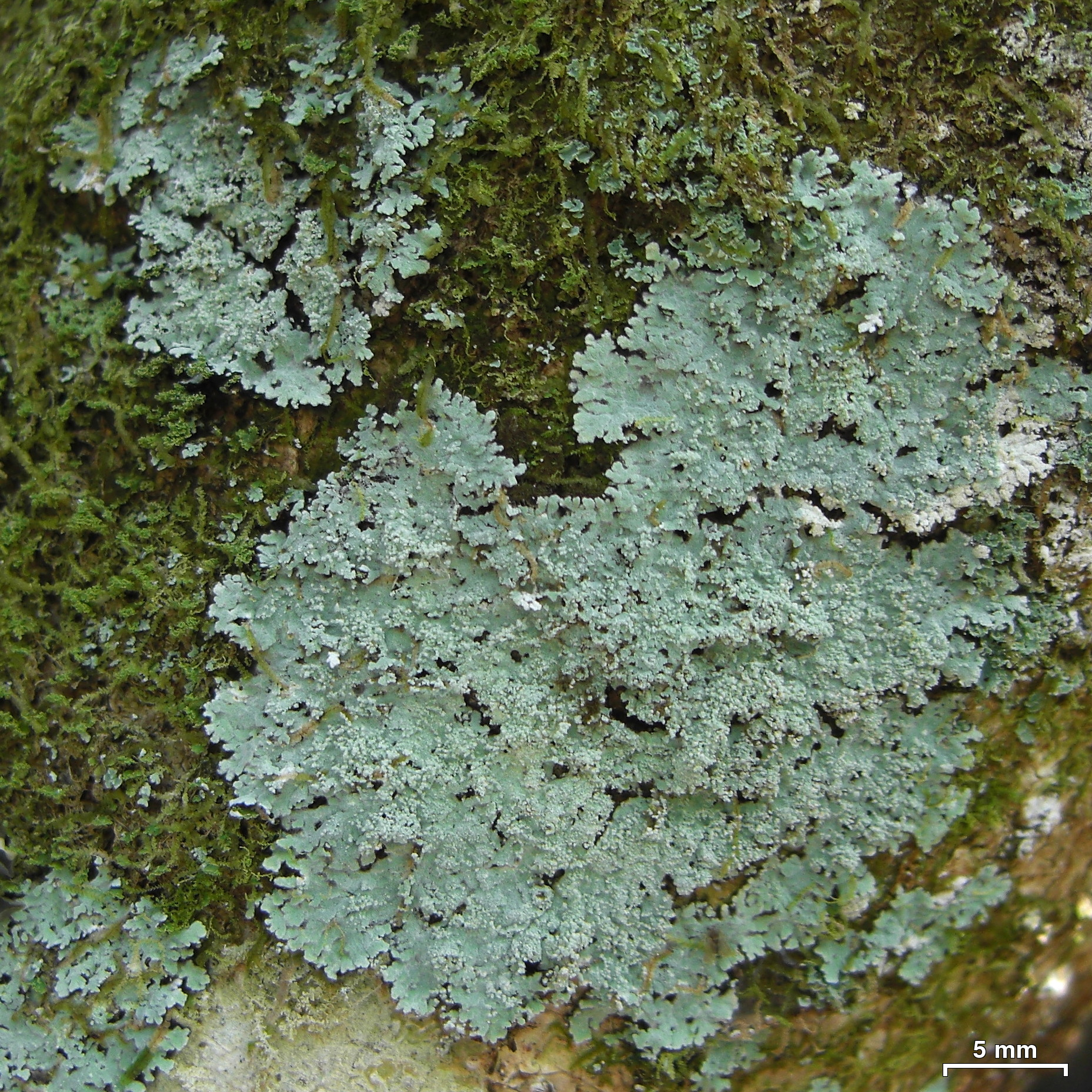

Scientific classification
- Kingdom: Fungi
- Division: Ascomycota
- Class: Lecanoromycetes
- Order: Lecanorales
- Family: Ramalinaceae
- Genus: Phyllopsora
- Species: P. pyxinoides

Binomial name
- Phyllopsora pyxinoides (Nyl.) Kistenich, Timdal, Bendiksby & S.Ekman (2018)

Synonyms
- Crocynia pyxinoides Nyl. (1891)

= Phyllopsora pyxinoides =

Species of lichen-forming fungus

Phyllopsora pyxinoides is a species of corticolous (bark-dwelling), lichen-forming fungus in the family Ramalinaceae. It was first described by William Nylander in 1891 from Cuban material, originally under the name Crocynia pyxinoides, and was transferred to Phyllopsora in 2018. The lichen forms whitish to blue-grey crusts with a black underside and produces small, dark, convex fruiting bodies. It is widely distributed in the tropics and subtropics, with records from the Americas, South and Southeast Asia.

== Taxonomy ==
It was first formally described by the Finnish lichenologist William Nylander in 1891 as Crocynia pyxinoides. The species was based on Charles Wright's Cuban material, with the holotype preserved in Nylander's herbarium (specimen H-NYL 22059). The specimen label refers to a published set of Cuban lichen specimens (Lichenes Cubenses, series 2, no. 145) assembled by Tuckerman and Wright. The taxon was reclassified in the genus Phyllopsora in 2018.

== Description ==
In the original description, Nylander characterized the lichen body (thallus) as whitish to blue-grey, closely pressed to its substrate, and arranged in somewhat overlapping, shallowly scalloped lobes that give the whole patch a vaguely rosette-like (placodioid) outline. He noted that the underside is black, with even the upper edges of the lobes faintly darkened. The fruiting bodies (apothecia) were described as dark brown to black, convex, and lacking a rim of thalline tissue (thalline margin), measuring about 0.5–0.8 mm across. Each spore-bearing sac (ascus) contains eight ascospores, which are undivided (simple), ellipsoid to oblong, and about 4–6 by 2 micrometres. The surface layer of the fruiting disc (epithecium) was colourless, the tissue beneath it (hypothecium) brown, and the spore-producing layer (hymenium) turned blue and then quickly tawny-red in iodine. Nylander also described the species as bark-dwelling and distinguished it by its relatively thick thallus—up to about 0.5 mm—that gives no reaction to potassium hydroxide (K−) and has a black underside.

== Habitat and distribution ==
Phyllopsora pyxinoides is widely distributed in Brazil, where it has been documented from numerous states. It has also been found in Colombia, in mainland Ecuador, Mexico, and Florida. Outside of the Americas, the lichen has been reported from South and Southeast Asia, including India, Sri Lanka, and Thailand.
