= Phyllopsora borbonica =

Scientific classification
- Kingdom: Fungi
- Division: Ascomycota
- Class: Lecanoromycetes
- Order: Lecanorales
- Family: Ramalinaceae
- Genus: Phyllopsora
- Species: P. borbonica

Binomial name
- Phyllopsora borbonica Timdal & Krog (2001)
- Holotype: towards Plaine d'Affouches, Réunion

Species of lichen

Phyllopsora borbonica is a species of crustose lichen in the family Ramalinaceae. It grows in humid woodland environments across several Indian Ocean islands including Mauritius and Réunion, as well as in Sri Lanka, typically found at elevations between 540 and 1255 metres. The species forms colonies with a distinctive brownish-black base layer that develops into a continuous pale green crust. It produces abundant reddish-brown reproductive structures up to 2 mm in diameter, and is characterized by its unusually long, needle-shaped spores that help distinguish it from related species.

== Taxonomy ==
Phyllopsora borbonica was formally described as a new species in 2001 by the lichenologists Einar Timdal and Hildur Krog. The species is classified within the genus Phyllopsora primarily based on several distinctive features: a brownish black prothallus (the initial fungal growth stage) that forms colonies of pale green, scattered areas (areolae) that eventually merge; reproductive structures (apothecia) with slightly pubescent margins; upper cortex of type 2 (lacking an epinecral layer); strongly gelatinised lower tissue (hypothecium) that merges into the surrounding tissue (excipulum); and simple, needle-like reproductive spores.

The species shares similarities with P. mauritiana but differs in having a more extensive growth pattern and thinner prothallus. P. borbonica also has darker reproductive structures (apothecia) that often turn black on the underside, and longer, needle-like spores. Acicular (needle-shaped) spores are unusual in the genus Phyllopsora, being known in Africa only in the squamiform (scale-like), radiate species P. longispora.

== Description ==
Phyllopsora borbonica has a crusty (crustose) thallus that is diffuse in growth pattern. The thallus is formed by a medium-thick, brownish-black prothallus and small, closely packed, pale green and smooth areolae. These discrete areolae join at their edges to form a more or less continuous crust in the central parts of the lichen. The upper cortex (outer protective layer) is 10–15 μm thick and classified as type 2, with an algal layer filling the inner part of the areolae. Neither the cortex nor the algal layer contains crystals.

The reproductive structures (apothecia) are abundant, up to 2 mm in diameter, rounded to somewhat flexible in shape, and reddish-brown in colour. The margin is sometimes slightly pubescent (having fine, soft hairs) when young and paler than the disc. The underside sometimes darkens to black. The inner tissue structure includes a pale brown to colourless inner part, pale brown to dark reddish-brown rim, dark brown to reddish-brown upper hypothecium, and paler lower part, with a colourless epithecium (the uppermost layer of the apothecium). No crystals are present in the apothecia, but a reddish-brown pigment in the rim and hypothecium turns purple when potassium hydroxide solution (K+) is applied. The spores are needle-like (acicular), simple, and measure 20–45 by 2–3 μm. Chemical analysis indicates that this lichen does not produce any lichen products that can be detected by standard chemical spot tests.

== Habitat and distribution ==
Phyllopsora borbonica is found in humid woodland environments at elevations ranging from 540 to 1255 metres above sea level. The species has been documented in Mauritius and Réunion in the Indian Ocean. Specific collection sites include Plaines Wilhems in Macchabee Forest (Mauritius) and various locations in Réunion, including Forêt de Bélouve, the Grand Étang, and along the road towards Plaine d'Affouches above Bras Citron (where the type specimen was collected). It 2014, P. borbonica was reported from Sri Lanka.
