= Phyllopsora neotinica =

Scientific classification
- Kingdom: Fungi
- Division: Ascomycota
- Class: Lecanoromycetes
- Order: Lecanorales
- Family: Ramalinaceae
- Genus: Phyllopsora
- Species: P. neotinica

Binomial name
- Phyllopsora neotinica Kistenich & Timdal (2019)

Species of lichen

Phyllopsora neotinica is a species of corticolous (bark-dwelling), squamulose (scaley) lichen in the family Ramalinaceae. Found in North, Central, and South America, it was formally described as a new species in 2019 by lichenologists Sonja Kistenich and Einar Timdal. It is similar to Phyllopsora chodatinica, but unlike that species, it contains argopsin and often zeorin, but it lacks chodatin. The species epithet neotinica is a contraction of "neotropical" and Phyllopsora chodatinica.
