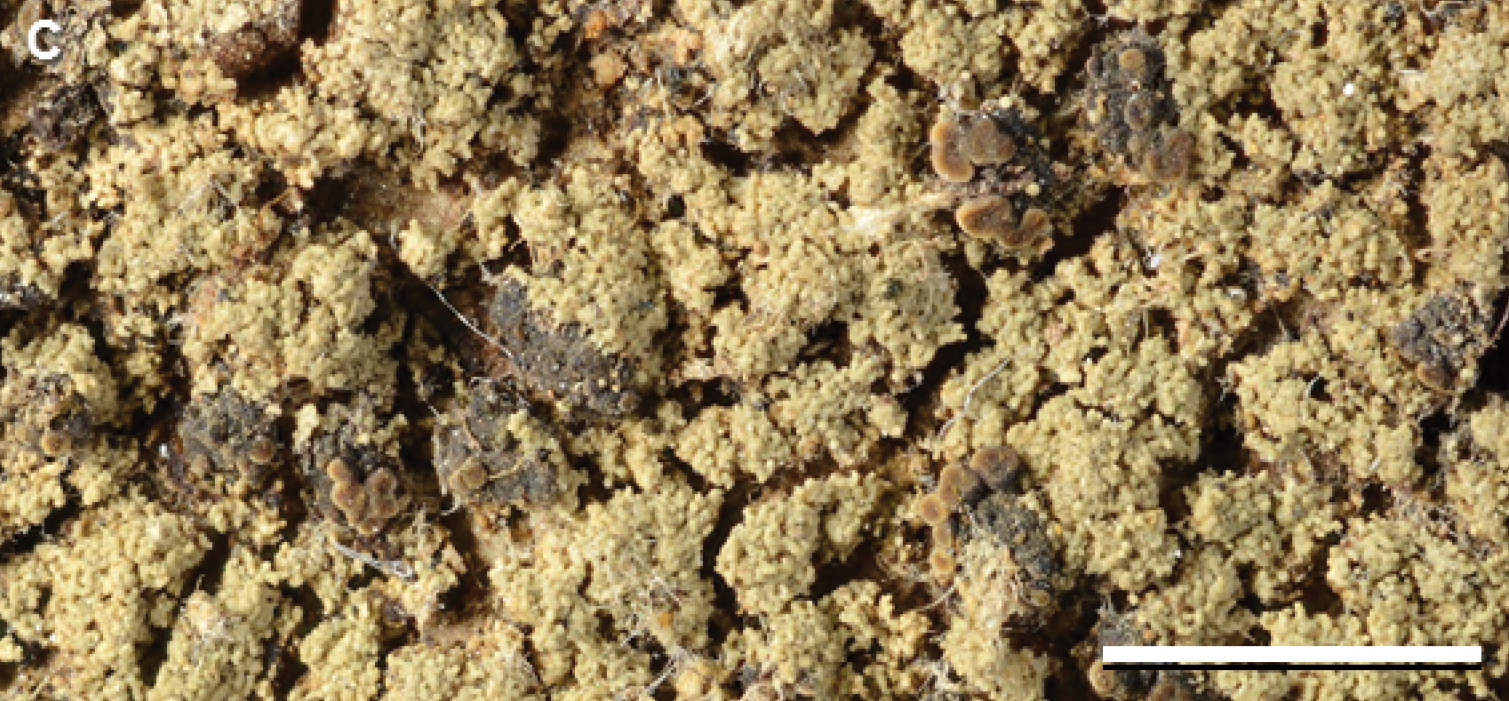

Scientific classification
- Kingdom: Fungi
- Division: Ascomycota
- Class: Lecanoromycetes
- Order: Lecanorales
- Family: Ramalinaceae
- Genus: Phyllopsora
- Species: P. dolichospora

Binomial name
- Phyllopsora dolichospora Timdal & Krog (2001)
- Holotype: Plaines Wilhems, Mauritius

= Phyllopsora dolichospora =

Species of lichen

Phyllopsora dolichospora is a species of lichen-forming fungus in the family Ramalinaceae. It forms a crust-like growth on surfaces in tropical forest environments across East Africa (including Tanzania), Mauritius, the Seychelles, and Sri Lanka, typically found at elevations ranging from sea level to 1,800 metres. The species is characterized by its small, green to reddish-brown thallus that produces numerous finger-like projections, and by its distinctive needle-shaped spores that are longer than those of related species. It can be further distinguished by its unique chemical composition. This lichen typically grows in montane rainforests and humid woodland habitats, often found along forest edges, escarpments, and pathways.

== Taxonomy ==
Phyllopsora dolichospora was formally described as a new species by the lichenologists Einar Timdal and Hildur Krog. The specific epithet dolichospora refers to its characteristically long spores, which help distinguish it from related species. It is morphologically similar to P. furfuracea but differs primarily in having longer ascospores and in containing secondary metabolites not found in P. furfuracea.

The type specimen was collected in Mauritius, in the Machabée Forest, about 0.5–1 km east-southeast of Machabee Kiosk, at an elevation of 600 metres. This holotype specimen is preserved in the herbarium collection at the University of Oslo (O) under the reference code Krog & Timdal MAU65/22.

== Description ==
Phyllopsora dolichospora has a thallus (main body) that forms a spreading crust developing from a prothallus (initial fungal growth stage). The crust consists of small areolae (island-like segments) that often merge to form a continuous surface. The thallus ranges from indistinct to well-developed, with a colour that varies from white to reddish-brown. The areolae are attached to the substrate along their entire lower surface (adnate), are roughly circular and of equal diameter (isodiametric), and are flat to slightly convex. They appear medium to dark green and may be smooth (glabrous) or slightly fuzzy (pubescent) along the edges.

Isidia, the small vegetative reproductive structures, are abundant, moderately thick, often elongated, and range from medium to dark green. They can be smooth or occasionally coral-like in appearance, often curved, and attached at their base while rising upward. The upper cortex is about 5–15 μm thick, classified as type 2, and lacks crystals, while the medulla contains crystals that dissolve in potassium hydroxide solution (KOH).

Apothecia (fruiting bodies) are common in P. dolichospora, measuring up to 2 mm in diameter. They have an irregular shape, typically forming clusters, and range from flat to slightly convex and from medium to dark brown in colour, with a somewhat indistinct, often slightly paler margin that may be smooth or slightly fuzzy, especially in younger specimens.

The excipulum, the outer protective layer of the apothecium, is pale brown with scattered darker brown patches, containing colourless crystals that dissolve in KOH. The hypothecium, the tissue beneath the spore-producing layer, is pale brown in its lower portion and more reddish-brown in its upper part, containing scattered colourless crystals that dissolve in KOH. The epithecium, the tissue above the spore-producing layer, is pale brown. The ascospores are needle-shaped (bacilliform), simple (without internal divisions), and measure 16–25 by 2–3 μm. Pycnidia, the asexual reproductive structures, were not observed in the examined specimens.

=== Chemistry ===
Phyllopsora dolichospora contains several distinctive secondary metabolites. Chemical analysis has revealed that the lichen produces methyl furfuraceiate and methyl homofurfuraceiate as its major chemical constituents, with furfuraceic acid present in minor amounts. The original 2001 description had reported furfuracein (now recognized as synonymous with furfuraceic acid) as the major compound, along with a series of unidentified substances called F1, F2, and F3.

== Habitat and distribution ==
Phyllopsora dolichospora grows in montane rainforests and humid woodland habitats. It has been documented across a significant elevation range in East Africa from sea level up to 1,800 metres altitude, in Tanzania at elevations between 1,450–1,600 metres, particularly in the Southern Highlands Province and Tanga Province, in Mauritius at approximately 600 metres altitude, and in the Seychelles from sea level up to 460 metres altitude.

Specific collection sites include the Shewa Province in Ethiopia, Rufiji District and Iringa District in Tanzania, the west Usambara Mountains, and Mahé Island in the Seychelles. The species tends to inhabit forest edges, escarpments, and areas along paths and roads in tropical regions. In 2014, it was reported from Sri Lanka.
