= Phyllopsora amazonica =

Scientific classification
- Kingdom: Fungi
- Division: Ascomycota
- Class: Lecanoromycetes
- Order: Lecanorales
- Family: Ramalinaceae
- Genus: Phyllopsora
- Species: P. amazonica

Binomial name
- Phyllopsora amazonica Kistenich & Timdal (2019)

Species of lichen

Phyllopsora amazonica is a species of corticolous (bark-dwelling), crustose lichen in the family Ramalinaceae. It is found in the Amazon rainforest of Brazil.

== Taxonomy ==
Phyllopsora amazonica was formally described as a new species in 2019 by lichenologists Sonja Kistenich and Einar Timdal. The type specimen was collected by the authors from the research station of the Estação Científica Ferreira Penna in the Floresta Nacional de Caxiuanã (Melgaço, Pará), where it was found in a tropical rainforest growing on a tree trunk at a height of 0.7 m (2.3 ft) above the ground. The species epithet amazonica refers to its habitat in the Amazon rainforest.

== Description ==
The lichen has an effuse, crust-like thallus comprising small, pale green to white areoles (up to 0.4 mm in diameter) and a thin, white prothallus. Isidia are frequent, cylindrical to flask-shaped (lageniform), with dimensions of 0.12 by 0.70 mm. The apothecia are rounded, brownish, and small – measuring up to 1 mm in diameter. Phyllopsora amazonica contains atranorin as a major lichen product, as well as several terpenoid compounds.

== Similar species ==
Phyllopsora halei, found in North America, Africa, and Asia, has a sister taxon phylogenetic relationship with P. amazonica. They are somewhat similar in appearance, but differ in the prothallus dimensions and colour (in P. halei, it is more prominent, thicker, and reddish brown), the formation of isidia (in P. hali, they sometimes grow directly out of the prothallus), and the overall form of the thallus (P. halei has rosette-like thalli).
