= Phyllopsora lividocarpa =

Scientific classification
- Kingdom: Fungi
- Division: Ascomycota
- Class: Lecanoromycetes
- Order: Lecanorales
- Family: Ramalinaceae
- Genus: Phyllopsora
- Species: P. lividocarpa

Binomial name
- Phyllopsora lividocarpa Timdal (2008)
- Type locality: Jenaro Herrera, Peru

Species of lichen-forming fungus

Phyllopsora lividocarpa is a species of bark- and rock-dwelling, squamulose lichen in the family Ramalinaceae. It was described in 2008 from collections made in lowland Amazon rainforest in Peru, and is distinguished from similar species by its pale gray fruiting bodies and the presence of crystals in its reproductive structures. The lichen has since been recorded from Brazil and Australia.

== Taxonomy ==
Phyllopsora lividocarpa was described as new by Einar Timdal in 2008 from lowland Amazonian rainforest near Jenaro Herrera, Loreto, Peru, at an elevation between 120 and 150 m (390 and 490 ft). The type specimen contains an unidentified major chemical substance together with a minor unknown fatty acid. It can be told from the otherwise similar P. atrocarpa by its paler, gray-toned apothecia (rather than brownish-black), and by the presence of crystals in the apothecial rim and cap (excipulum and epithecium). P. atrocarpa instead contains fumarprotocetraric acid and lacks those crystals.

== Description ==
The lichen body (thallus) forms a thin, spreading mat of very small green scales (squamules) up to about 0.3 mm wide. These are initially flat and closely pressed to the bark, later lifting slightly. Their edges are not hairy, and the tips often produce fine finger-like outgrowths (lacinules) that increase the surface area. A thin black border (prothallus) may be present or absent. In cross-section, the outer "skin" (upper cortex) is thin (about 10–20 μm) and lacks crystals. The inner tissue (medulla), along with the algal layer, contains colorless crystals that dissolve in potassium hydroxide solution (KOH). In standard spot tests, the thallus is PD negative (consistent with the fatty-acid chemistry reported for this species).

Fruiting bodies (apothecia) are common, small (to about 1 mm), round to lobed, and flat to slightly convex. They are pale brown to almost colorless when young, later medium to dark gray, usually with a slightly darker rim. Under the microscope, the apothecial rim (excipulum), the layer beneath the spores (hypothecium), and the surface layer (epithecium) all contain crystals that dissolve in KOH. The spores are long and needle-shaped (acicular), 21.5–33 × 1.5–2 μm, with up to four faint internal cross-walls (pseudosepta). No asexual pycnidia were seen.

Thin-layer chromatography shows an unknown major lichen substance plus a minor unknown fatty acid. In practical terms, this chemical profile helps separate P. lividocarpa from look-alikes in the field or lab when combined with the apothecial crystals and spore shape.

== Habitat and distribution ==
Phyllopsora lividocarpa is known from two localities in the Peruvian Amazon, where it grows on the bark of tree trunks in primary lowland rainforest. It was common at both localities, recorded from a total of 15 sites. Documented sites include the Allpahuayo-Mishana National Reserve and the Jenaro Herrera area. It was later recorded from Rondônia, Brazil, and from riparian forests in the Sinos River basin of Rio Grande do Sul, southern Brazil, where it grew on tree trunks. In that study, it was the most abundant and widespread lichen species at one sampled site. Outside of South America, the lichen has been reported to occur in Queensland, Australia, where it was growing on rocks in tropical rainforest along the Mossman River.
