= Clifford Wetmore =

American lichenologist 1934 - 2020

Clifford Major Wetmore
- Born: June 20, 1934; Akron, Ohio, USA
- Died: June 1, 2020 (aged 85); Phoenix, Arizona, USA
- Education: Kent State University; Michigan State University
- Alma mater: Michigan State University
- Known for: cyanophilic lichens and the genus Caloplaca; lichens and air quality; collecting and herbarium curation
- Spouse: Ruth Small
- Partner: Chin Ping Yang
- Children: 2
- Scientific career
- Fields: lichenology
- Institutions: Wartburg College; University of Minnesota
- Thesis: The lichen flora of the Black Hills of South Dakota and Wyoming
- Doctoral advisors: Henry Andrew Imshaug
- Notable students: Lois Brako
- Author abbrev. (botany): Wetmore

Clifford M. Wetmore (1934 - 2020) was an American lichenologist, developing the herbarium at University of Minnesota to be a leader in curation and content. He was known for his international expertise on cyanophilic lichens and the genus Caloplaca. He also collected and authored definitive assessments of the lichen biota of the national parks in the United States.

== Early life and education ==
Clifford Major Wetmore was born 20 June 1934 in Ohio, USA. He attended Kent State University, initially to study electrical engineering, but changed to biology after spending a summer in a national park. After 2 years he transferred to Michigan State University and graduated in 1956 with a degree in park management and municipal forestry. He then started on a Masters program in ecology but after attending a course on lichens by Henry Andrew Imshaug he changed direction, and focused on lichens, especially their taxonomy, for the rest of his life. He obtained his MSc degree involving a study of the genus Nephroma, in 1959.

He continued to work with Imshaug and studied the lichens of the Black Hills for his doctorate. This was awarded in 1965, and his thesis was published as a monograph in 1967, remaining an important reference. During his career he travelled extensively to view and collect lichens; this had started during his master's degree through travelling to the Caribbean with Imshaug and he accompanied Emanuel David Rudolph to Victoria Land in Antarctica during his doctoral studies.

== Research and career ==
In 1964 Wetmore was employed at Wartburg College, Iowa, but moved to the University of Minnesota in 1970 and remained there until retirement in 2012. During this time he developed the university's lichen herbarium from 12,000 to 170,000 specimens and was a pioneer of computerised cataloging. He established the collection and its curation practices as one of the leaders in the USA. He also exchanged lichen and bryophyte specimens with other herbaria around the world.

His research focused on cyanophilic lichens and the genus Caloplaca. He was very active in surveying and collating records of lichens in the US, especially national parks, and relating them to air quality and elemental composition of the lichens to assess their health. He continued this work after his retirement. From 1992, along with James P. Bennett, he developed a database of the lichens in the US National Parks, made available in 2005. It included 25,995 records of lichens in 144 national park areas. Wetmore prepared a very extensive series of reports on the lichen flora of individual national parks, mainly for the US Department of Agriculture Forestry Service and State and private forestry.

From the mid-1950s until 2000, Wetmore made extensive collections of lichens, primarily from the US and Canada but also China and Australia. In total, Wetmore collected around 111,000 specimens from all parts of the United States as well as Mexico, Canada, the Caribbean, Australia, the Falkland Islands and China. One of his achievements was a key to the lichens of China..

== Later and personal life ==
He continued his research on lichens after retirement. He was married to Ruth Small and they had 2 children together. He was later the partner of Chin Ping Yang from Taiwan. He died on 1 June 2020.

== Publications ==
Wetmore was the author or co-author of at least 135 scientific publications. These included an extensive series of reports on the lichen flora of national parks in the US, archived in the digital repository at University of Minnesota library system. He was also an author or co-author of many contributions to scientific journals, including:

- Clifford M. Wetmore (2004) The sorediate corticolous species of Caloplaca in North and Central America The Bryologist 107 (4) 505–520
- Clifford M. Wetmore (1994) The lichen genus Caloplaca in North and Central America with brown or black apothecia Mycologia 86 (6) 813–838.
- Clifford M. Wetmore (1970) The Lichen Family Heppiaceae in North America Annals of the Missouri Botanical Garden 57 (2) 158–209.

Wetmore produced two exsiccata:

- Lichenes exsiccati (1997–2000, 125 numbers in five fascicles)
- Teloschistaceae exsiccati (2002–2008, 100 numbers in four fascicles).

Wetmore also assisted many others with identification of lichen specimens.

== Awards and honours ==
- 1969, Jesse M. Greenmann Award from the Missouri Botanical Garden
- 1971 - 1972 NSF Science Faculty Fellowship to work at Clark University with Vernon Ahmadjian

== Legacy ==
Wetmore's collections of lichens are now held mainly in the University of Minnesota but with further specimens in many collections such as University of Colorado Museum of Natural History Herbarium Lichen Collection and the National Herbarium of Victoria.

Six species of lichen have been named after him and one genus, Wetmoreana, a genus of lichen-forming fungi in the family Teloschistaceae.
