= Phyllopsora concinna =

Scientific classification
- Kingdom: Fungi
- Division: Ascomycota
- Class: Lecanoromycetes
- Order: Lecanorales
- Family: Ramalinaceae
- Genus: Phyllopsora
- Species: P. concinna

Binomial name
- Phyllopsora concinna Kistenich & Timdal (2019)

Synonyms
- Mycobilimbia cocinna (Kistenich & Timdal) S.Y.Kondr. (2019)

Species of lichen

Phyllopsora concinna is a species of corticolous (bark-dwelling), squamulose (scaley) lichen in the family Ramalinaceae. Found in Central and South America, it was formally described as a new species in 2019 by lichenologists Sonja Kistenich and Einar Timdal. The lichen has a scaley, effuse (spread-out) thallus that is pale green with a well-developed, white prothallus. Apothecia occur rarely; they are brownish with a paler margin, measuring up to 1 mm in diameter. Ascospores are simple (i.e., lacking septa) with a narrow ellipsoid to fusiform shape, and dimensions of 12.5–16·0 by 3.5–4.0 μm. Atranorin and parvifoliellin are major lichen products that occur in this species. The latter compound distinguishes it chemically from the morphologically similar species Phyllopsora cinchonarum, which instead contains lobaric acid. The botanical name concinna (from the Latin concinnus, meaning "pretty" or "pleasing"), refers to its "beautiful" appearance.
