= Phyllopsora nigrocincta =

Scientific classification
- Kingdom: Fungi
- Division: Ascomycota
- Class: Lecanoromycetes
- Order: Lecanorales
- Family: Ramalinaceae
- Genus: Phyllopsora
- Species: P. nigrocincta

Binomial name
- Phyllopsora nigrocincta Timdal (2008)
- Type locality: Jenaro Herrera, Peru

Species of lichen-forming fungus

Phyllopsora nigrocincta is a species of corticolous (bark-dwelling), crustose to squamulose lichen in the family Ramalinaceae. It was described in 2008 from specimens collected in lowland Amazon rainforest in Peru. The species is recognized by its dark gray to black fruiting bodies and a distinctive orange pigment that turns purple when treated with potassium hydroxide. It has also been recorded from Brazil and Colombia.

== Taxonomy ==
Phyllopsora nigrocincta was formally described as new by Einar Timdal (2008) from specimens collected in lowland Amazonian rainforest near Jenaro Herrera, Loreto, Peru, at an elevation between about 120 and 150 m (390 and 490 ft). The holotype contains fumarprotocetraric acid together with a distinctive orange pigment that gives a strong purple reaction to potassium hydroxide solution (K). In Timdal's treatment it is distinguished within the genus Phyllopsora by its clearly apotheciate nature, as it readily forms fruiting discs. It is further characterized by the combination of dark gray to black apothecia, an olive-brown hypothecium (the tissue beneath the disc), and an excipulum (the rim) containing orange, K+ (purple) crystals.

== Description ==
The thallus (lichen body) is crustose to almost scaly, forming round to spreading patches on bark. The peripheral border (prothallus) is thick and conspicuous, first bluish-black and later reddish-brown. The surface breaks into small 'islands' or tiny scales (areolae/squamules) up to about 0.3–0.4 mm wide that are grayish-green, dull, and without a powdery coating. The margins are a little paler and can be faintly hairy. No vegetative propagules (such as soredia or isidia) were seen. The very thin outer "skin" (upper cortex) lacks crystals. Inside, the algal layer and upper medulla contain colorless crystals that dissolve in KOH (spot tests PD−, K−), while the lower medulla contains orange crystals that dissolve in KOH with a strong purple flush.

Fruiting bodies (apothecia) are common, small (to about 0.8 mm), round to slightly lobed, flat to weakly convex, and dark gray to black, with a persistent rim that is dark orange to chestnut-brown. The rim tissue (excipulum) is dark reddish-brown and filled with orange crystals that turn K+ (purple) when tested. The tissue beneath the disc (hypothecium) is olive-brown and lacks crystals, and the surface layer (epithecium) is colorless. The ascospores are simple (non-septate), ellipsoid to spindle-shaped, about 5–8 × 2.5–3 μm. Pycnidia (asexual fruiting bodies) have not been observed in this species. Chemically, the species contains two major lichen products: fumarprotocetraric acid, and the K+ (purple) orange pigment.

== Habitat and distribution ==
Phyllopsora nigrocincta was originally described from two lowland regions in the Peruvian Amazon, where it was found across nine specific study sites. It typically grows on the bark of tree trunks in |primary (old-growth) rainforest, often favoring shaded microhabitats. Documented collections include material from the Allpahuayo-Mishana National Reserve and from the Jenaro Herrera area. It was later recorded from various provinces of Brazil, and from Colombia.
