= Lois Brako =

American mycologist (born 1957)

- Born: July 25, 1957
- Citizenship: American
- Scientific career
- Fields: Botany, Mycology
- Doctoral advisor: Richard Harris, City University New York
- Author abbrev. (botany): Brako

Lois Brako (born July 25, 1957) is an American botanist, mycologist and explorer. She has conducted botanical expeditions in Peru. Brako has a Bachelor’s of Science degree from Queens College, a Master’s of Science studying lichens from the University of Minnesota working with Clifford Wetmore, and a Ph.D. in biology from the City University of New York supervised by Richard Harris.

Lois Brako's botanical eponym is "Brako". She has contributed to the discovery of 13 different plants. All of these plant species are flowering plants, with 9 that are part of the Hippeastrum family.

In 1991 her career moved into university administration, successively at the universities of Michigan, Wisconsin and Missouri. She was Assistant Vice President for Research–Regulatory and Compliance Oversight, at the University of Michigan, Ann Arbor until her retirement in 2021. She was also on national committees and from 2009-2015 she served as the co-chair for the Federal Demonstration Partnership’s Human Subject Subcommittee.

== Publications ==
- Brako, L. 1991. Phyllopsora (Bacidiaceae). Flora neotropica. 551–66
- -----------; AW Meerow; L. Brako. 1993. New combinations in Hippeastrum, Ismene, and Leptochiton (Amaryllidaceae) for the flora of Peru. Novon 3: 28–30
- -----------. Inga (Fabaceae), Plantaginaceae, Rosaceae, Sapindaceae. In: L. Brako & J. L. Zarucchi (eds.), Catalogue of the Flowering Plants & Gymnosperms of Peru. Monogr. Syst. Bot. Missouri Bot. Gard. 45: 481–486, 923–925, 1003–1010, 1059–1068. 1993
- 1981. The lichens of Wabasha and Winona counties, Minnesota. Ed. University of Minnesota. 278 pp.
- 1987. The lichen genus Phyllopsora (Bacidiaceae) in the neotropics. Ed. City University of New York. 532 pp.
- 1991. Phyllopsora (Bacidiaceae). Number 55 Flora neotropica. Ed. Organization for Flora Neotropica by the New York Botanical Garden. 66 pp. ISBN 0893273643
- 1993. Catalogue of the flowering plants and gymnosperms of Peru: Catálogo de las angiospermas y gimnospermas del Perú. Number 45 Monographs in systematic botany from the Missouri Botanical Garden. 1.286 pp. ISBN 0915279193
- -----------, Amy Y. Rossman, David F. Farr. 1995. Scientific and common names of 7,000 vascular plants in the United States. U.S. National Fungus Collections. Number 7 Contributions from the U.S. National Fungus Collections. 295 pp. ISBN 089054171X

== Sources ==
- Harvard Botanist Index: Lois Brako
