= Sanjeeva Nayaka =

Indian lichenologist

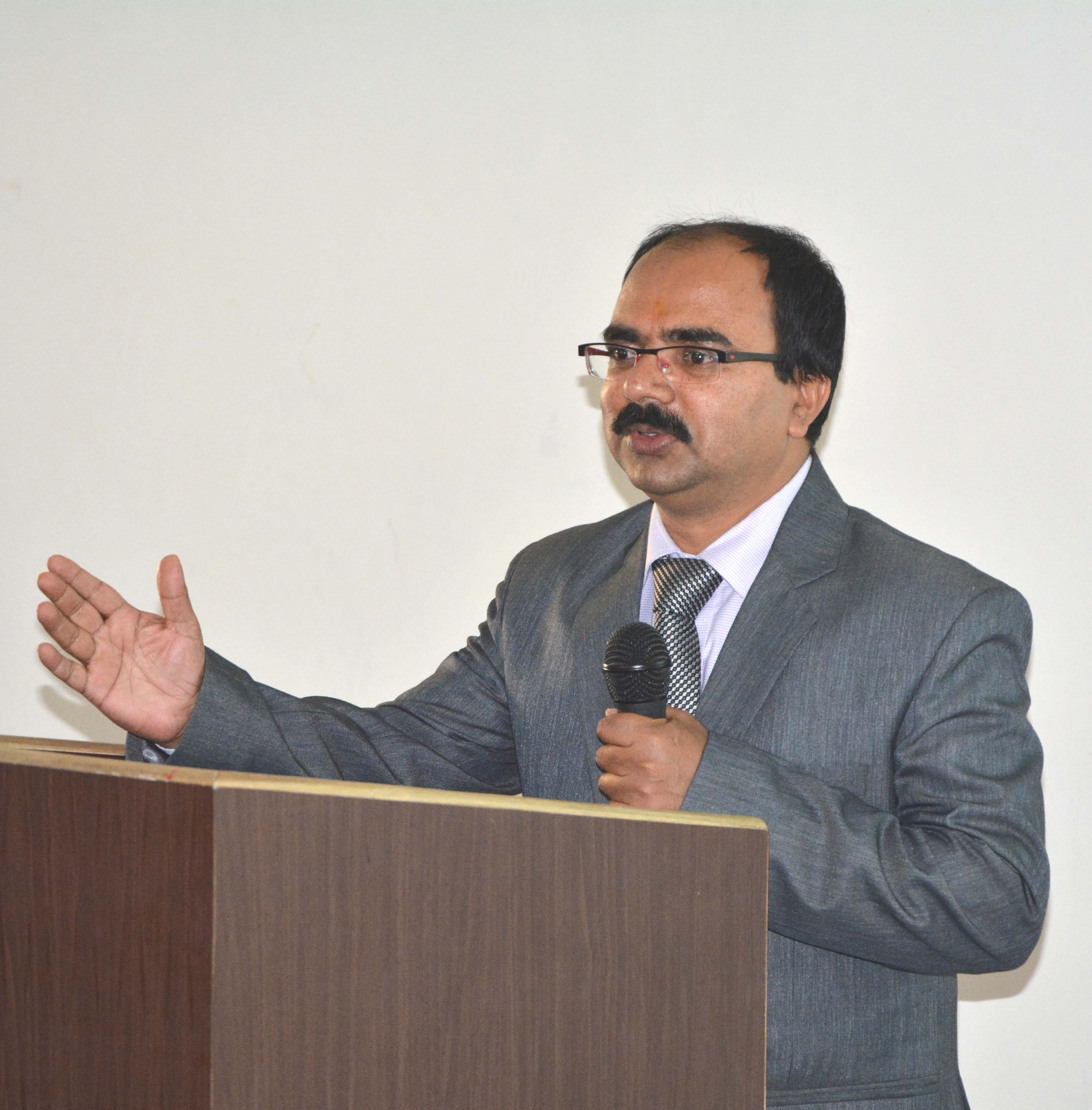
- Born: 1 August 1974 (age 51); Koppa, Chikmagalore district, Karnataka, India
- Scientific career
- Fields: Lichen systematics
- Institutions: Plant Diversity, Systematics and Herbarium Division, CSIR - National Botanical Research Institute
- Author abbrev. (botany): Nayaka
- Website: nbri.res.in

Sanjeeva Nayaka (Hindi: संजीव नायक; Kannada: ಸಂಜೀವ ನಾಯಕ) is an Indian lichenologist. He is a Chief Scientist at CSIR-National Botanical Research Institute (CSIR-NBRI), Lucknow. He is in charge of the lichenology laboratory. He serves as managing editor of the journal Cryptogam Biodiversity and Assessment, and editor of ILS eLetters, both published by the Indian Lichenological Society.

== Career ==
Nayaka was introduced to research during his graduate studies. He was a volunteer in the 'Western Ghats Biodiversity Inventory Programme'. He was awarded with a Summer Research Fellowship of Jawaharlal Nehru Centre for Advanced Scientific Research, Bangalore to study the lichens of Bangalore under Madhav Gadgil. After his post-graduation Nayaka moved to Lucknow to work with Dr. D.K. Upreti at CSIR-NBRI. Initially he worked as a project assistant on the All-India Coordinated Project on Taxonomy. During this period, he explored lichens of Himachal Pradesh. In 2001 he was appointed as a scientist at CSIR-NBRI.

Nayaka revised the genus Lecanora for his doctoral thesis under Upreti's supervision. He earned his Ph.D. from Dr. R. M. L. Awadh University, Faizabad. His research interests include taxonomy, biomonitoring and bioprospecting of lichens. Apart from Lecanora he has revised taxa such as Buellia, Lecidea, Phyllopsora and Rinodina. He has described 28 new lichen species and reported over 110 species as new distributional record. Nayaka travelled throughout India and published lichen floristic accounts for several regions. His major work involves lichens of Himachal Pradesh, Uttar Pradesh, Gujarat and Eastern Ghats. He surveyed various wildlife sanctuaries and national parks in India, and he has visited Antarctica twice to study its lichens and their ecophysiology. He has handled eight research projects as Principal Investigator and he is a co-Investigator on more than 25 projects. Nayaka published more than 200 research articles. He participated in national and international conferences and published about 180 abstracts. He authored or edited three books: A field Guide to the common Lichens of Corbett Tiger Reserve, Lichens of Uttar Pradesh, and Plant Diversity of Uttar Pradesh (Including Algae and Fungi).

== Recognition ==
- Fellow of Linnean Society, London (2021)
- Fellow of Mycological Society of India
- Fellow of International Society for Environmental Botanist (ISEB), India
- Life member of International Association for Lichenology

== See also ==
- Category:Taxa named by Sanjeeva Nayaka
