= Phyllopsora rosei =

Scientific classification
- Kingdom: Fungi
- Division: Ascomycota
- Class: Lecanoromycetes
- Order: Lecanorales
- Family: Ramalinaceae
- Genus: Phyllopsora
- Species: P. rosei

Binomial name
- Phyllopsora rosei Coppins & P.James (1979)

Species of lichen in the family Ramalinaceae

Phyllopsora rosei is a species of lichen belonging to the family Ramalinaceae.

It is native to Western Europe.
