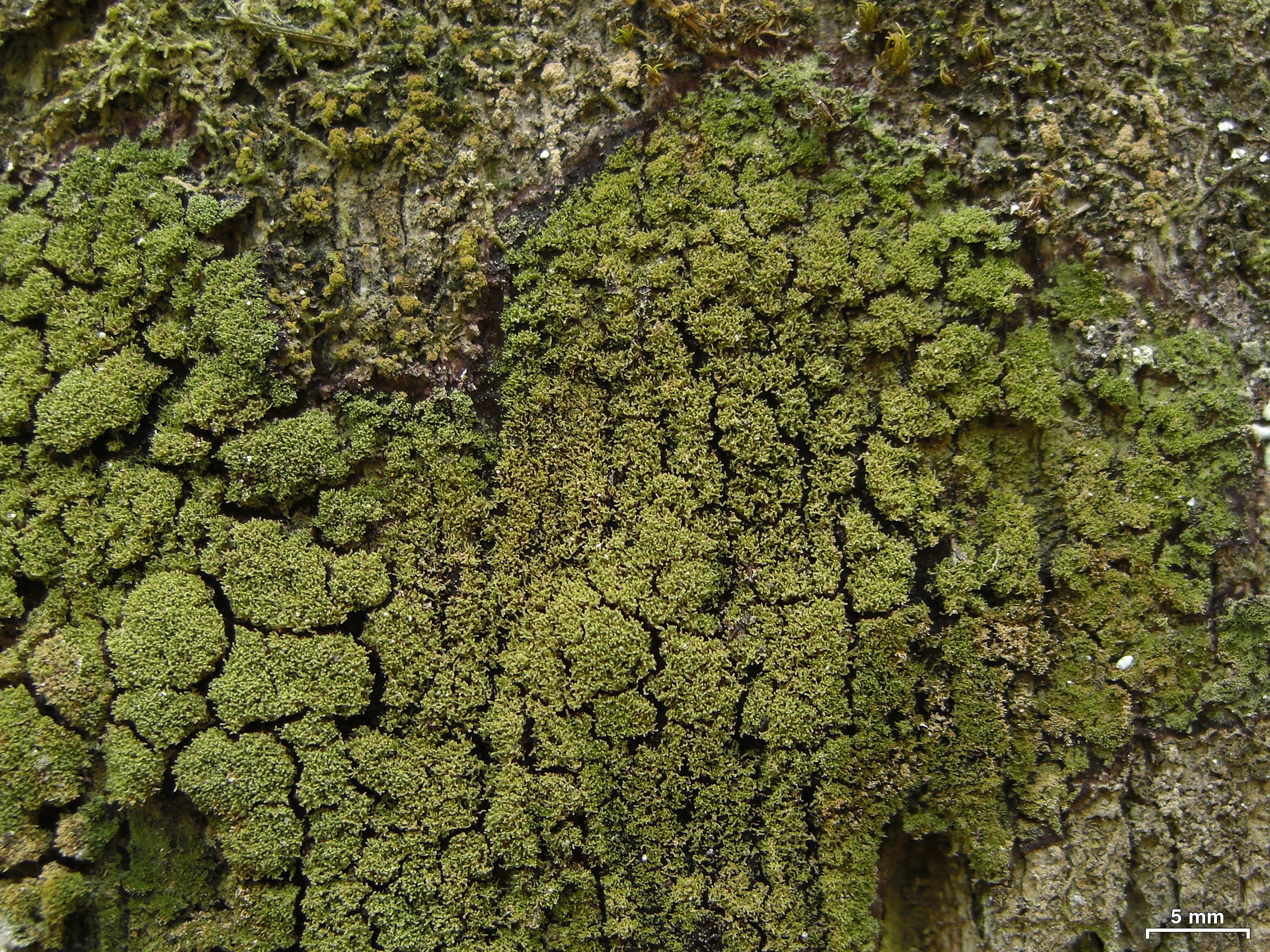
- Phyllopsora furfuracea in Fakahatchee Strand State Preserve, Florida

Scientific classification
- Kingdom: Fungi
- Division: Ascomycota
- Class: Lecanoromycetes
- Order: Lecanorales
- Family: Ramalinaceae
- Genus: Phyllopsora; Müll.Arg. (1894)

Type species
- Phyllopsora breviuscula (Nyl.) Müll.Arg. (1894)

Synonyms
- Triclinum Fée (1825); Psoromopsis Nyl. (1869); Physcidia sect. Callopis Müll.Arg. (1883); Callopis (Müll.Arg.) Gyeln. (1933); Squamacidia Brako (1989)

= Phyllopsora =

Genus of lichens

Phyllopsora is a genus of lichen-forming fungi in the family Ramalinaceae.

The characteristics of a fossilized Phyllopsora, P. dominicana, found in Dominican amber, suggests that the main distinguishing features of the genus have remained unchanged for tens of millions of years.

== Taxonomy ==
The genus was circumscribed by the Swiss botanist Johannes Müller Argoviensis in 1894, with Phyllopsora breviuscula assigned as the type species.

In 2019, a proposal was made to conserve the name Phyllopsora against the earlier names Triclinum and Crocynia. This was due to Phyllopsora including species that are the types of these earlier generic names, which would have priority. The proposal argued that conserving Phyllopsora would be the least disruptive option, as taking up Triclinum would require 56 new combinations, while Crocynia included many species now considered to belong to other genera. In 2024, the Nomenclature Committee for Fungi recommended conservation of Phyllopsora against Triclinum and Crocynia, with 80% of the committee voting in favour.

Squamacidia was brought into synonymy with Triclinum as a direct result of typification work: Per Magnus Jørgensen lectotypified Triclinum cinchonarum with Fée's protologue figure and epitypified it with a specimen identified as Physcidia endococcina; Brako had earlier treated P. endococcina as a variety of Squamacidia janeirensis, the type species of Squamacidia. This ties T. cinchonarum to the same element that fixes Squamacidia, so Squamacidia falls under Triclinum, with cinchonarum the oldest available epithet. Subsequent phylogenetic work showed T. cinchonarum to be nested within Phyllopsora, which is why treating Triclinum under Phyllopsora also carries Squamacidia into Phyllopsora and motivated the 2019 conservation proposal.

== Description ==
The genus Phyllopsora is distinguished by its scale-like (squamulose) to almost leaf-like (foliose) body (thallus) that often has a distinct border (prothallus). Its reproductive structures, known as asci, have a unique feature: an amyloid dome and a narrow, cone-shaped central structure. The fruiting bodies (apothecia) of this genus are made up of highly gelatinized (jelly-like) fungal threads. These threads show no clear separation between the different structural layers of the apothecium, and this gelatinised texture is consistent throughout the central and marginal areas of the apothecium as well as in the supporting structures (paraphyses). The ascospores produced by Phyllopsora are small, with thin walls, and are typically not divided into separate compartments (rarely septate).

== Species ==
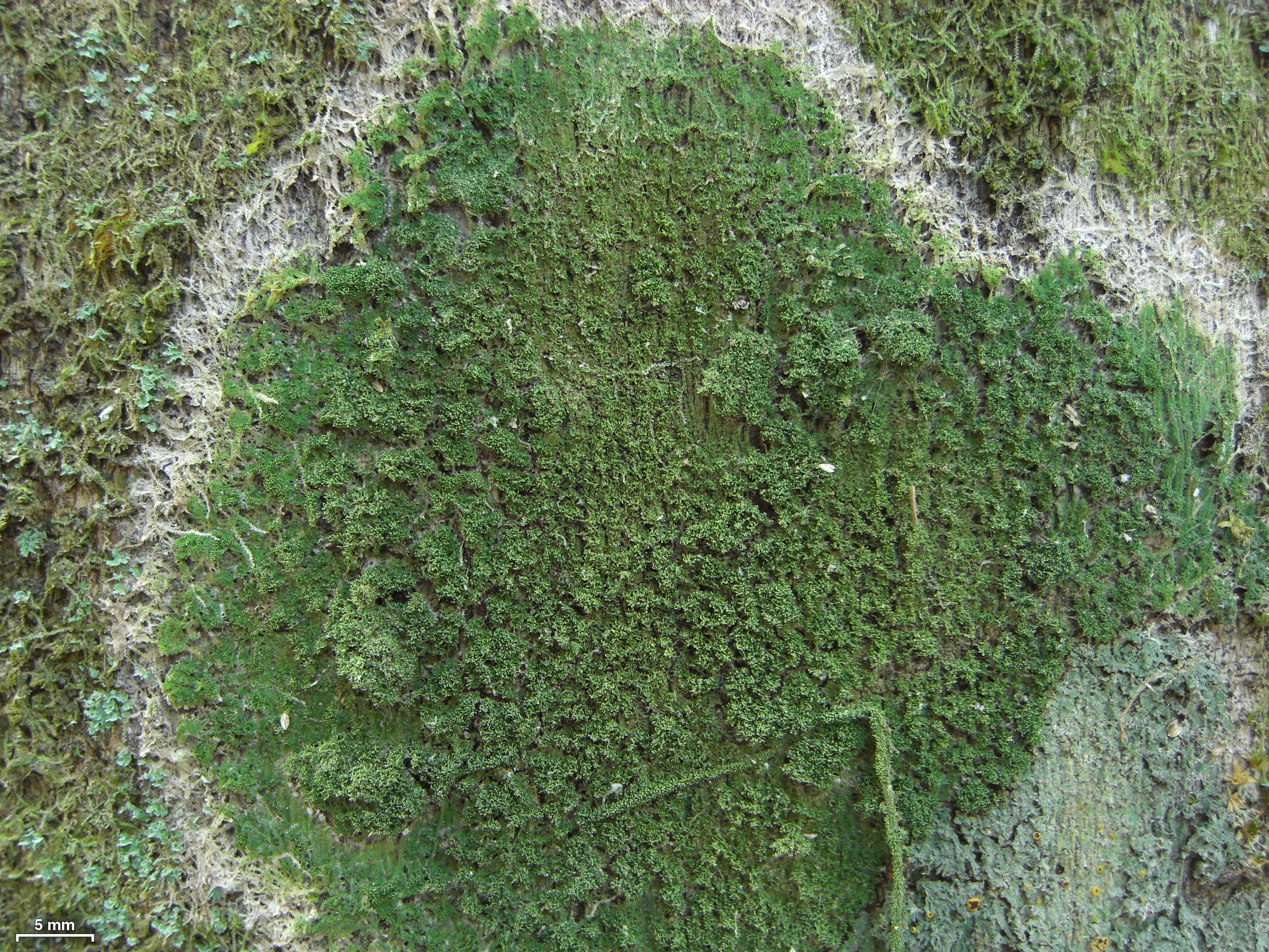
Phyllopsora isidiolyta

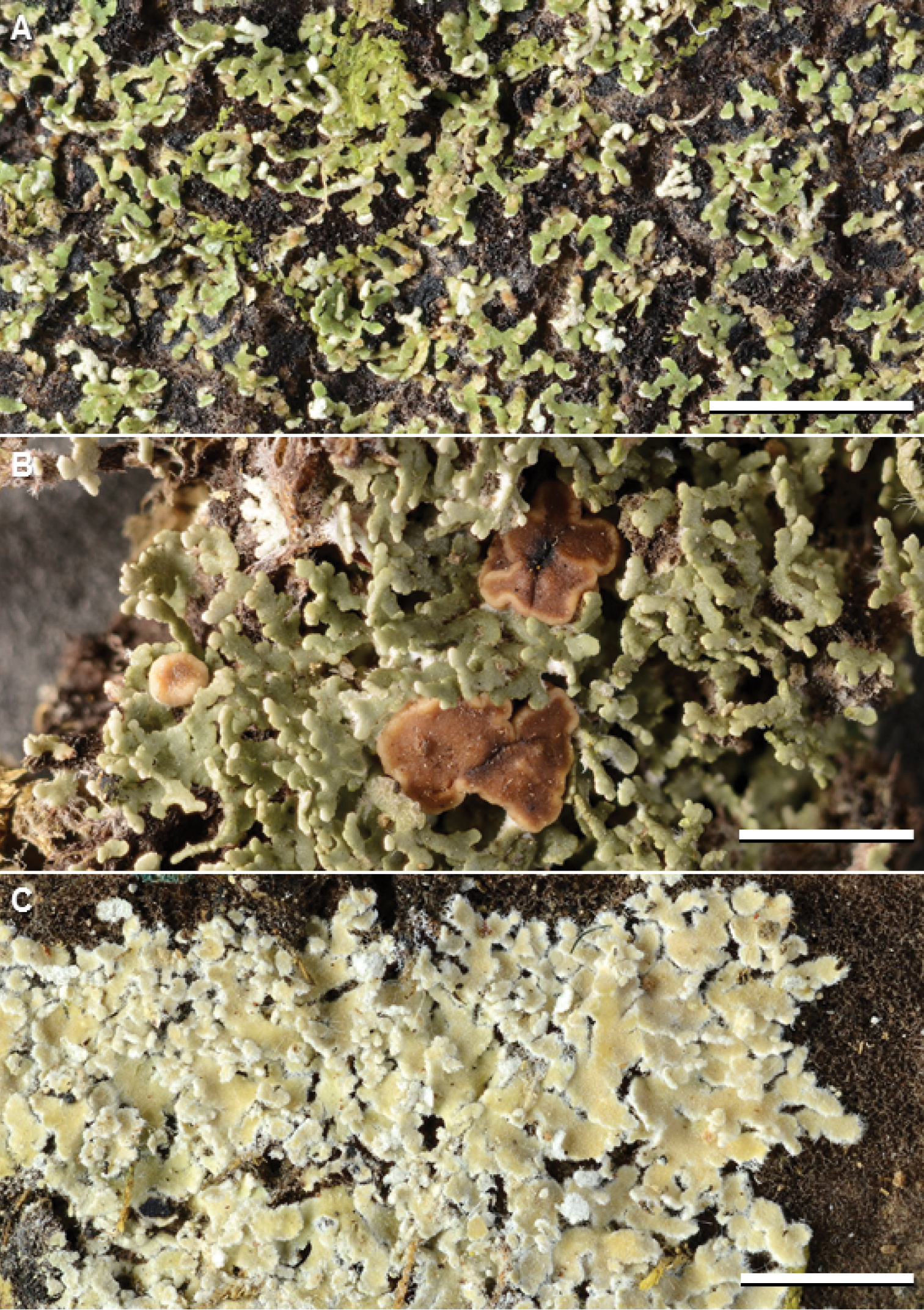
A: Phyllopsora africana; B: P. breviuscula C: P. buettneri

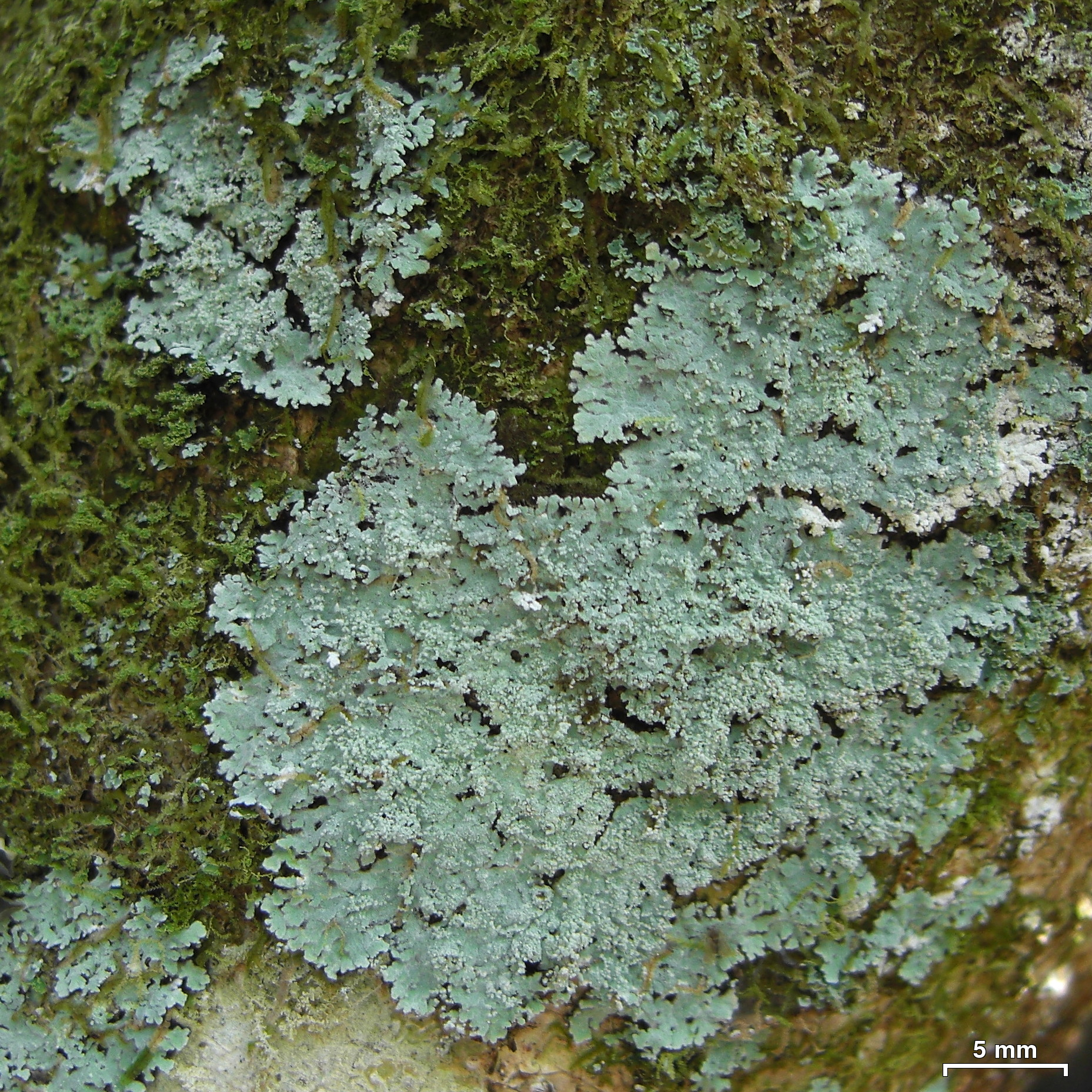
Phyllopsora pyxinoides

As of December 2023, Species Fungorum accepts 48 species of Phyllopsora:

- Phyllopsora amazonica Kistenich & Timdal (2019)
- Phyllopsora atrocarpa Timdal (2008) – Peru
- Phyllopsora buettneri (Müll.Arg.) Zahlbr. (1926)
- Phyllopsora borbonica Timdal & Krog (2001)
- Phyllopsora breviuscula (Nyl.) Müll.Arg. (1894)
- Phyllopsora castaneocincta (Hue) Kistenich & Timdal (2019)
- Phyllopsora catervisorediata G.K.Mishra, Upreti & Nayaka (2011) – India
- Phyllopsora chodatinica Elix (2006) – Australia
- Phyllopsora cinchonarum (Fée) Timdal (2008)
- Phyllopsora cognata (Nyl.) Timdal (2011)
- Phyllopsora concinna Kistenich & Timdal (2019)
- Phyllopsora conwayensis Elix (2006) – Australia
- Phyllopsora corallina (Eschw.) Müll.Arg. (1894)
- Phyllopsora dodongensis S.Y.Kondr. & Hur (2020) – South Korea
- Phyllopsora dolichospora Timdal & Krog (2001)
- Phyllopsora dominicana Rikkinen (2008)
- Phyllopsora foliata (Stirt.) Zahlbr. (1926)
- Phyllopsora foliatella Elix (2006) – Australia
- Phyllopsora furfuracea (Pers.) Zahlbr. (1905)
- Phyllopsora furfurella Kistenich & Timdal (2019)
- Phyllopsora glaucella (Vain.) Timdal (2008)
- Phyllopsora glaucescens Timdal (2008) – Peru
- Phyllopsora gossypina (Sw.) Kistenich, Timdal, Bendiksby & S.Ekman (2018)
- Phyllopsora himalayensis G.K.Mishra, Upreti & Nayaka (2011) – India
- Phyllopsora hispaniolae Timdal (2011)
- Phyllopsora homosekikaica Elix (2006) – Australia
- Phyllopsora imshaugii Timdal (2011)
- Phyllopsora isidiosa Kistenich & Timdal (2019)
- Phyllopsora lividocarpa Timdal (2008) – Peru
- Phyllopsora loekoesii S.Y.Kondr., Farkas, S.O.Oh & Hur (2016)
- Phyllopsora magna Kaasalainen, Rikkinen & A.R.Schmidt (2017)
- Phyllopsora methoxymicareica Elix (2006) – Australia
- Phyllopsora nemoralis Timdal & Krog (2001)
- Phyllopsora neofoliata Elix (2006) – Australia
- Phyllopsora neotinica Kistenich & Timdal (2019)
- Phyllopsora nigrocincta Timdal (2008) – Peru
- Phyllopsora parvifolia (Pers.) Müll.Arg. (1894)
- Phyllopsora phaeobyssina (Vain.) Timdal (2011)
- Phyllopsora pocsii Vězda (2003)
- Phyllopsora pseudocorallina Kistenich & Timdal (2019) – Asia; Africa
- Phyllopsora pyxinoides (Nyl.) Kistenich, Timdal, Bendiksby & S.Ekman (2018)
- Phyllopsora rappiana (Brako) Elix (2006) – Australia
- Phyllopsora rosei Coppins & P.James (1979) – Europe
- Phyllopsora sabahana Kistenich & Timdal (2019) – Malaysia
- Phyllopsora siamensis Kistenich & Timdal (2019) – Thailand
- Phyllopsora soralifera Timdal (2008) – Peru
- Phyllopsora subhyalina (Stirt.) Zahlbr. (1926)
- Phyllopsora swinscowii Timdal & Krog (2001)
- Phyllopsora teretiuscula Timdal (2011)
- Phyllopsora tobagensis Timdal (2011)
