= Waynea giraltiae =

Scientific classification
- Kingdom: Fungi
- Division: Ascomycota
- Class: Lecanoromycetes
- Order: Lecanorales
- Family: Ramalinaceae
- Genus: Waynea
- Species: W. giraltiae

Binomial name
- Waynea giraltiae van den Boom (2010)

Species of lichen

Waynea giraltiae is a corticolous (bark-dwelling) species of lichen in the family Ramalinaceae. It was first described in 2010 from specimens collected on oak trees in southern Portugal, and was named in honour of Spanish lichen researcher Mireia Giralt. The lichen forms small, scale-like patches on tree bark and is distinguished by its fine covering of tiny hairs and orange-red reaction to certain chemical spot tests. Though initially known only from the southwestern Iberian Peninsula, it has since been found scattered across Europe, including Italy, Slovakia, and Russia, typically growing on oak and elm trees in forests.

== Taxonomy ==
The species was formally described in 2010 by the Dutch lichenologist Pieter P.G. van den Boom; the holotype was collected in the Algarve region of southern Portugal, on the trunk of Quercus rotundifolia (holm oak). The specific epithet honours the Spanish lichenologist Mireia Giralt for her contributions to lichen taxonomy in the Iberian Peninsula and Macaronesia. Within the genus Waynea, W. giraltiae most closely resembles Waynea cretica, but differs in having squamules with a fine tomentum (covering of tiny hairs), smaller and fewer-septate ascospores, and the presence of argopsin. It can also be confused with W. hirsuta, which has hairy squamules but is sorediate and has shorter, one-septate spores.

== Description ==
The thallus is corticolous, spreading across rough bark in patches up to 2 cm wide. It is finely squamulose (composed of small, scale-like lobes) to slightly granular, with squamules 0.1–0.3 mm (occasionally up to 0.4 mm) wide. Squamules are scattered to crowded, sometimes overlapping, and range from flat and appressed to strongly convex and ascending. The upper surface is greenish-grey to brown, with a matt appearance, and bears a fine tomentum of hyaline hairs 10–22 × 3–6 μm, visible only under magnification. The tomentum consists of hyaline, awl-shaped hairs formed by thick-walled, mostly septate hyphae that project through the cortex, 10–22 × 3–7 μm. The upper cortex is prosoplectenchymatous, 25–35 μm thick; the medulla is white and there is no lower cortex.

Apothecia (sexual fruiting bodies) are rare to abundant, 0.2–0.9 mm in diameter, rounded to irregular, and range in colour from greyish to dark brown or blackish. The margin is initially raised in young apothecia, becoming level with or excluded from the disc in older specimens. The disc is flat to slightly concave or weakly convex and is epruinose (lacking a frosty coating). Asci are of the Bacidia type (sometimes tending toward the Biatora type), containing eight ascospores each. The spores are colourless, fusiform (spindle-shaped), with three internal cross-walls (3-septate), and measure 12–18 × 2–2.5 μm. Pycnidia (asexual fruiting bodies) are very rare, producing long, thread-like (filiform), strongly curved to nearly circular conidia measuring 20–29 × 0.5 μm.

In spot tests, the thallus is K−, C−, KC−, P+ (orange-red); thin-layer chromatography (TLC) detects argopsin. The apothecial exciple and epithecium contain Sedifolia-grey pigment; pigmented parts turn violet with K (and red-violet with N). In contrast, Central European material (Portugal and Slovakia) showed no detectable lichen substances by TLC and a P− reaction.

=== Similar species ===
Sterile material of W. giraltiae can be confused with Agonimia opuntiella, but W. giraltiae has a distinct cortex over a medulla and its tomentum hairs are single thick-walled hyphae, whereas Agonimia has a paraplectenchymatous thallus throughout and hair-like projections composed of parallel hyphae. Sterile Physconia servitii can look similar, but its "hairs" are bundles of several hyphae and the thallus is whitish-grey rather than greenish; W. giraltiae has a thick hyaline upper cortex and single, thick-walled hyphae forming the tomentum.

== Habitat and distribution ==
Waynea giraltiae was first documented from the south-western Iberian Peninsula, ranging from south-eastern Alentejo to eastern Algarve in Portugal, with one locality in south-western Spain. In that region it occurs at 125–560 m on the bark of Quercus rotundifolia and forms sparse epiphytic communities; at the type locality associated species include Agonimia spp., Bacidia igniarii, Caloplaca obscurella, Collema spp., Lecania viridulogranulosa, Parmelina tiliacea, Phaeophyscia orbicularis, Physcia spp., and Waynea stoechadiana. At the time of description it was known from only five localities despite targeted searches, suggesting genuine rarity in the type area.

Subsequent records show a scattered but wider European distribution. It has been found in Slovakia on the Muránska planina plateau (Western Carpathians), on the dry bark of old Quercus petraea at c. 800–860 m, where it grows ombrophobically in deep trunk fissures with Bacidia rubella and Sclerophora pallida; the same study noted a Sicilian record. In Italy it is confirmed from Sicily (Monte Egitto on the western slope of Mount Etna, near Bronte, Catania), in an ancient Quercus congesta forest at c. 1,550 m, where it was reported as new to the Italian funga. In Russia it is recorded from the Western Caucasus (Lago-Naki plateau, Republic of Adygea), on old elms in dark coniferous–broadleaf forest at about 1,800 m; a regional summary further notes that across Europe the species occurs mainly in broadleaf and mixed forests, typically below 500–600 m, with occasional high-elevation occurrences around 1,500 m in southern Italy, and that beyond the Iberian Peninsula it is also known from Italy and Greece, with isolated finds in Czechia and Slovakia. Hosts recorded include Quercus rotundifolia, Quercus petraea, Quercus congesta, and Ulmus spp.
