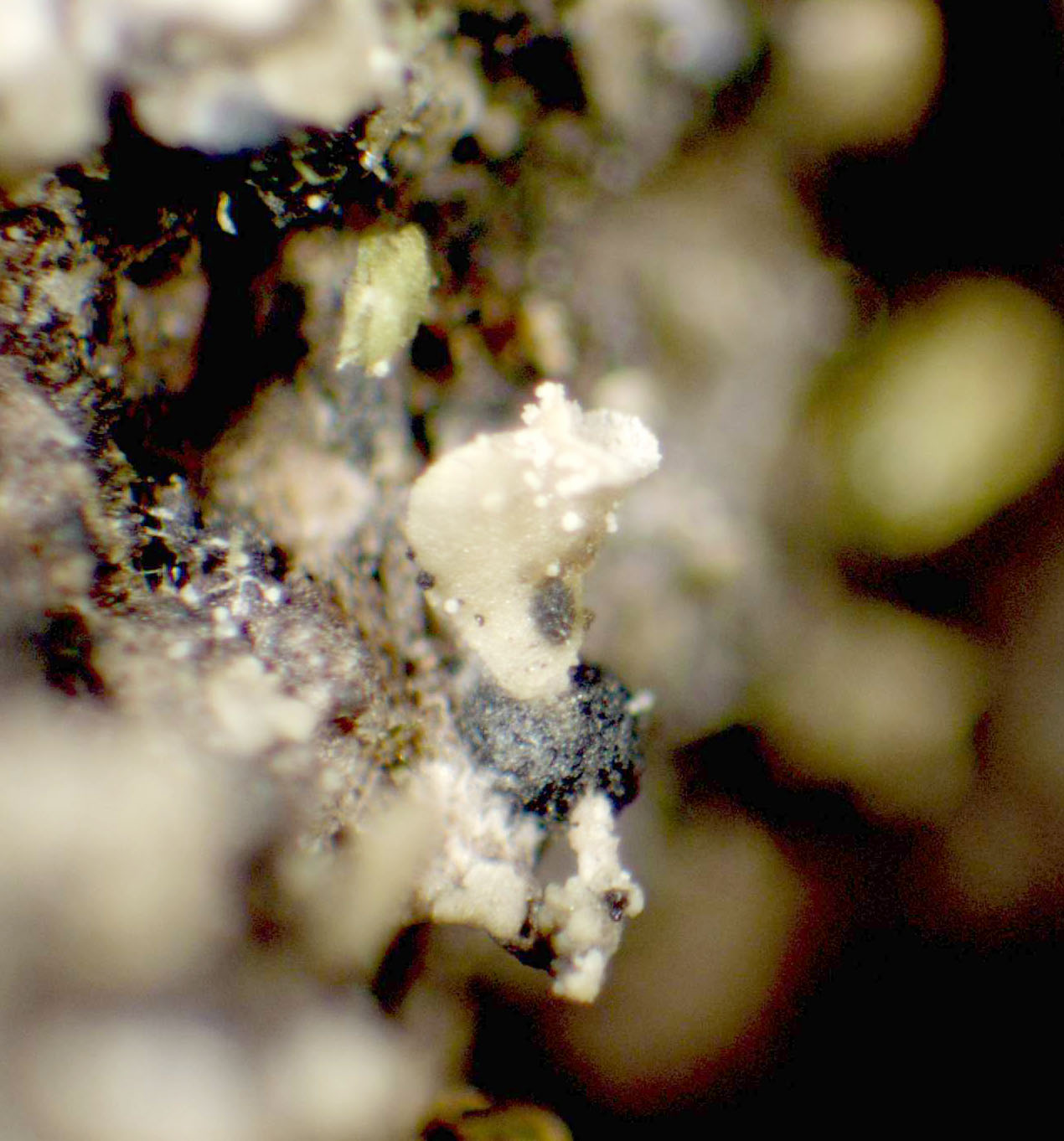
- Waynea adscendens

Scientific classification
- Kingdom: Fungi
- Division: Ascomycota
- Class: Lecanoromycetes
- Order: Lecanorales
- Family: Ramalinaceae
- Genus: Waynea; Moberg (1990)

Type species
- Waynea californica Moberg (1990)

Species
- W. adscendens W. algarvensis W. californica W. cretica W. giraltiae W. hirsuta

= Waynea =

Genus of lichen-forming fungi

Waynea is a genus of lichen-forming fungi in the family Ramalinaceae. The genus was established in 1990 by the Swedish lichenologist Roland Moberg and named after the Wayne family who helped organize his collecting trip to California, where he collected the type species. The tiny lichens in Waynea form patches made up of scale-like lobes less than half a millimetre across, with powdery cushions that help them spread without sexual reproduction. The genus contains six species. Most records are from southern and western Europe, particularly around the Mediterranean region, but it has also been reported from Russia (including Siberia) and western North America. Species of Waynea are corticolous, growing on the bark of trees and other woody plants (often oaks) in small patches that can coalesce into mats only a few millimetres wide.

== Taxonomy ==
Waynea was circumscribed in 1990 by the Swedish lichenologist Roland Moberg, who erected the genus to accommodate the new Californian species Waynea californica. Moberg placed his squamulose, sorediate lichen in the then-recognised family Bacidiaceae on account of its Bacidia-type asci, three-septate ascospores and biatorine, stalked apothecia (fruiting bodies), but he noted that it differed sharply from related genera in lacking secondary metabolites and a prothallus. He named the genus in honour of the Wayne family who had helped organise his collecting trip to Big Sur.

Subsequent morphological and molecular work showed that Bacidiaceae is not distinct from Ramalinaceae; current syntheses therefore place Waynea within that family. The genus remains recognised by its minute, often ascending squamules, stalked soralia or apothecia, and Bacidia-type asci with colourless, up-to-five-septate spores.

== Description ==
Waynea forms diminutive, olive- to brown-green patches made up of tiny, scale-like lobes called squamules. Each squamule is convex, often lifts slightly from the bark, and measures less than 0.5 mm across, but neighbouring thalli can coalesce into mats only a few millimetres wide. Pale swellings appear on the upper surface; these burst open to create short-stalked, cup-shaped soralia—powdery cushions that release soredia, the microscopic packets of algal and fungal cells used for vegetative spread. Occasional short-stemmed, bluish-grey apothecia (sexual fruit bodies) are also produced; their rim is pale and unpigmented, making them easy to overlook against the soralia—especially because both structures are barely half a millimetre across.

In section, the upper cortex is 20–30 μm thick and built of rounded, tightly packed cells, while the lower surface lacks any protective layer. A loose white medulla envelops Myrmecia-type green algal cells (spherical, 5–10 μm in diameter). The apothecial tissue contains slender, unbranched paraphyses with slightly swollen tips and cylindrical–clavate asci that each bear eight colourless, three-septate ascospores measuring 13–19 × 3–4 μm; the ascus apex stains blue in iodine, an amyloid reaction. No secondary lichen substances were detected in thin-layer chromatography of the type species, and the genus is further distinguished by the absence of a prothallus outlining the thallus margin.

== Habitat and distribution ==
Species of Waynea are corticolous lichens, growing on the bark of trees and other woody plants, with records spanning lowland coastal sites in the Algarve, to montane coniferous–broadleaf forests in the Western Caucasus. Hosts recorded include oaks (Quercus), including Q. rotundifolia, Q. coccifera, Q. petraea, and Q. congesta, as well as Acer sempervirens, Platanus orientalis, Olea europaea, Ulmus spp., and Populus balsamifera. Collections have been made on both exposed and shaded trunk surfaces along roadsides, as well as in more sheltered microhabitats such as deep trunk fissures on old bark.

In the Mediterranean region, W. cretica occurs on Crete in thermo- to meso-mediterranean belts (warm to moderately warm climate zones) at 100 and 500 m (330 and 1,640 ft), in humid ravines and canyons, and it has also been recorded from several localities in Portugal's Algarve. Waynea algarvensis is known only from the Algarve, where it inhabits lowland coastal sites at 15–50 m (49–164 ft), and has been found at only two localities despite the abundance of apparently suitable habitat in the region.

Waynea adscendens was described from Spain on Q. rotundifolia, and has since been recorded from France, Portugal, and Russia (Krasnodar Krai). Waynea giraltiae was first documented from the south-western Iberian Peninsula (Alentejo and Algarve in Portugal, and one locality in south-western Spain), where it occurs at 125–560 m (410–1,837 ft) on Q. rotundifolia and forms sparse epiphytic communities. Later records extend its range to Slovakia (Muránska planina plateau), Sicily (Mount Etna), and the Western Caucasus in Russia (Lago-Naki plateau, Republic of Adygea). The Russian material was collected on old elms in dark coniferous–broadleaf forest at about 1,800 m, and a regional summary characterises the species as mainly associated with broadleaf and mixed forests, typically below 500–600 m (1,600–2,000 ft), with occasional high-elevation occurrences around 1,500 m (4,900 ft). At the time of its description, W. giraltiae was known from only five localities despite targeted searches, suggesting that it may be genuinely scarce in its type area.

Outside Europe, W. californica is known from a few sites in California (including the Big Sur region and the Santa Lucia Range), where it grows on solitary trees in relatively open roadside habitats, especially on oaks. In Washington State it has been reported rarely, and has been proposed for monitoring as an oak-obligate indicator species in Garry oak woodlands. Waynea hirsuta is known from the Lake Baikal region of central Siberia (Tunkinsky District), where the type material was collected on old P. balsamifera within a closed stand of Pinus sibirica.

== Species ==
As of June 2025, Species Fungorum (in the Catalogue of Life) accept six species of Waynea:

- Waynea adscendens V.J.Rico (1991)
- Waynea algarvensis van den Boom (2012)
- Waynea californica Moberg (1990)
- Waynea cretica Llop (2006)
- Waynea giraltiae van den Boom (2010)
- Waynea hirsuta Tretiach (1999)

The taxon Waynea stoechadiana (Abbassi Maaf & Cl.Roux) Cl.Roux & P.Clerc (1991) is now classified in the genus Hypocenomyce as Hypocenomyce stoechadiana.
