= Agonimia tenuiloba =

Scientific classification
- Domain: Eukaryota
- Kingdom: Fungi
- Division: Ascomycota
- Class: Eurotiomycetes
- Order: Verrucariales
- Family: Verrucariaceae
- Genus: Agonimia
- Species: A. tenuiloba

Binomial name
- Agonimia tenuiloba Aptroot & M.Cáceres (2013)

Species of lichen

Agonimia tenuiloba is a species of corticolous (bark-dwelling) lichen in the family Verrucariaceae. Found in Brazil, it was formally described as a new species in 2013 by lichenologists André Aptroot and Marcela Cáceres. The type specimen was collected by the authors in the Estação Ecológica de Cuniã (Rondônia), where it was found growing on smooth tree bark in a rainforest. The lichen thallus comprises tiny, green, fan-shaped (flabellate) lobes (about 0.1 mm wide) and spherical goniocysts (clumps of photobiont cells surrounded by fungal hyphae). Its ascomata are in the form of perithecia that are 0.3–0.4 mm wide and grey in colour due to a thin thalline cover. Its ascospores typically measure 30–50 by 20–35 μm. The European species Agonimia flabelliformis is similar in morphology, but it has shorter and narrower ascospores.
