= Waynea californica =

Conservation status
- Imperiled (NatureServe)

Scientific classification
- Kingdom: Fungi
- Division: Ascomycota
- Class: Lecanoromycetes
- Order: Lecanorales
- Family: Ramalinaceae
- Genus: Waynea
- Species: W. californica

Binomial name
- Waynea californica Moberg (1990)

Species of lichen

Waynea californica is a species of lichen in the family Ramalinaceae. This rare lichen forms small, scale-like patches on oak tree trunks, with an olive-green to brownish-green surface that develops distinctive cup-shaped structures filled with powdery reproductive material. It is known primarily from California, particularly around Big Sur and the Santa Lucia Mountains, with rare reports also from Washington State, where it grows on solitary oak trees in relatively open areas.

== Taxonomy ==
The genus Waynea and its first described species, Waynea californica, were proposed by the Swedish lichenologist Roland Moberg in 1990. The holotype specimen was collected in 1986 along Highway 1 near Big Sur, Monterey County, California, on the trunk of an oak (Quercus). Moberg named the genus after the Wayne family, who hosted him during his trip to California. The species was placed in the family Bacidiaceae based on features of its reproductive structures, although its thallus form, apothecial anatomy, and chemistry did not match any existing genus within the family. It shows some similarities to genera such as Phyllopsora and Toninia, but differs in lacking a prothallus and lichen substances, and in having distinctive soralia. Subsequent research placed W. californica in a small group with two other species, all sharing cup- or hood-shaped soralia, the absence of lichen substances, and slender, multi-septate spores. These characters distinguish it from the chemically distinct group around Waynea stoechadiana.

== Description ==
The lichen forms an irregular, squamulose (scale-like) thallus made up of small patches up to about 0.5 cm across, which can merge to form larger colonies. Each patch consists of a few convex, upward-curving squamules less than 0.5 mm wide. The upper surface is olive-green to brown-green, sometimes glossy, and develops pale spots that become knob-like outgrowths. These eventually open into cup-shaped soralia—structures that produce powdery clusters of reproductive cells (soredia) for asexual dispersal. The lichen lacks a distinct lower cortex, and its photobiont partner is a green alga of the Myrmecia type.

Apothecia (sexual fruiting bodies) are rare, small (up to 0.5 mm across), and borne on short stalks. They are bluish gray with a pale, smooth (biatorine) margin. Inside, the spore-bearing layer (hymenium) is up to 80 μm tall. The asci (spore sacs) are cylindrical to club-shaped, each producing eight spores and possessing an amyloid (starch-reactive) apical dome. The ascospores are colorless, elongated with three internal cross-walls (3-septate), and measure 13–19 × 3–4 μm. No pycnidia have been observed, and chemical analysis by thin-layer chromatography has detected no lichen substances.

== Habitat and distribution ==
Waynea californica is known only from a few sites in California, including the Big Sur region and the Santa Lucia Mountains. It grows on the trunks of solitary trees, especially oaks, in relatively open habitats along roadsides, occurring on both exposed and shaded trunk surfaces. The type collection was found alongside other lichens such as species of Physcia and Phaeophyscia. The species' combination of cup-shaped soralia and small, stalked apothecia makes it distinctive, although the apothecia can be difficult to see because they are pale and often mixed with the soralia. In Washington, Waynea californica has been rarely reported and is proposed for monitoring as an oak-obligate indicator species in Garry oak woodlands.
