= Waynea algarvensis =

Scientific classification
- Kingdom: Fungi
- Division: Ascomycota
- Class: Lecanoromycetes
- Order: Lecanorales
- Family: Ramalinaceae
- Genus: Waynea
- Species: W. algarvensis

Binomial name
- Waynea algarvensis van den Boom (2012)

Species of lichen

Waynea algarvensis is a rare species of corticolous (bark-dwelling) squamulose lichen in the family Ramalinaceae. Native to the Algarve province in Portugal, it was formally described as a new species in 2012. Closely related to Waynea cretica, this lichen is characterized by its minute thallus parts and fusiform (spindle-shaped) ascospores. Found primarily on olive trees, this lichen forms part of understudied epiphytic communities in the region.

== Taxonomy ==
The lichen was formally described by Dutch lichenologist Pieter van den Boom. The species name algarvensis refers to the Algarve province of southern Portugal, where the type specimen was discovered. The type was found in a field on an Olea europaea tree near Lagos, Portugal.

== Description ==
Waynea algarvensis features a corticolous thallus, which is minutely squamulose and up to 5 mm wide. The squamules are plane to slightly convex and appressed. The species is similar to Waynea cretica but can be distinguished by its smaller thallus parts, apothecia diameter, and the shape and septation of its ascospores. The apothecia are abundant and vary in size from 0.15 to 0.5 mm in diameter, with ascospores that are fusiform and usually 3-4-septate (more rarely, as few as 0 or as many as 5 septa), measuring 15–25 by 2–2.5 μm. The conidia are bacilliform, measuring 9–12 by 0.9–1.1 μm.

Waynea algarvensis is often overlooked due to its small size and can be easily confused with Waynea cretica, which also has small appressed squamules. However, the ascospores of W. cretica are acicular, 5-7 septate, and measure 30–45 by 1.5–2 μm. The chemistry of the two species is not different, as both lack any chemical substances. Waynea algarvensis also resembles Bacidia igniarii in terms of its small apothecia, thin greyish-brown thallus, and 3-septate ascospores, but B. igniarii has always black apothecia and somewhat shorter and wider ascospores.

== Habitat and distribution ==
Waynea algarvensis is native to the Algarve province in southwestern Portugal, where it inhabits lowland coastal regions at altitudes between 15–50 m (49–164 ft). The species is exclusively found on olive trees within epiphytic communities that are relatively poor in lichen diversity. Despite the abundance of potential habitats in the Algarve region, Waynea algarvensis has been found in only two locations, suggesting that it is a rare species.
