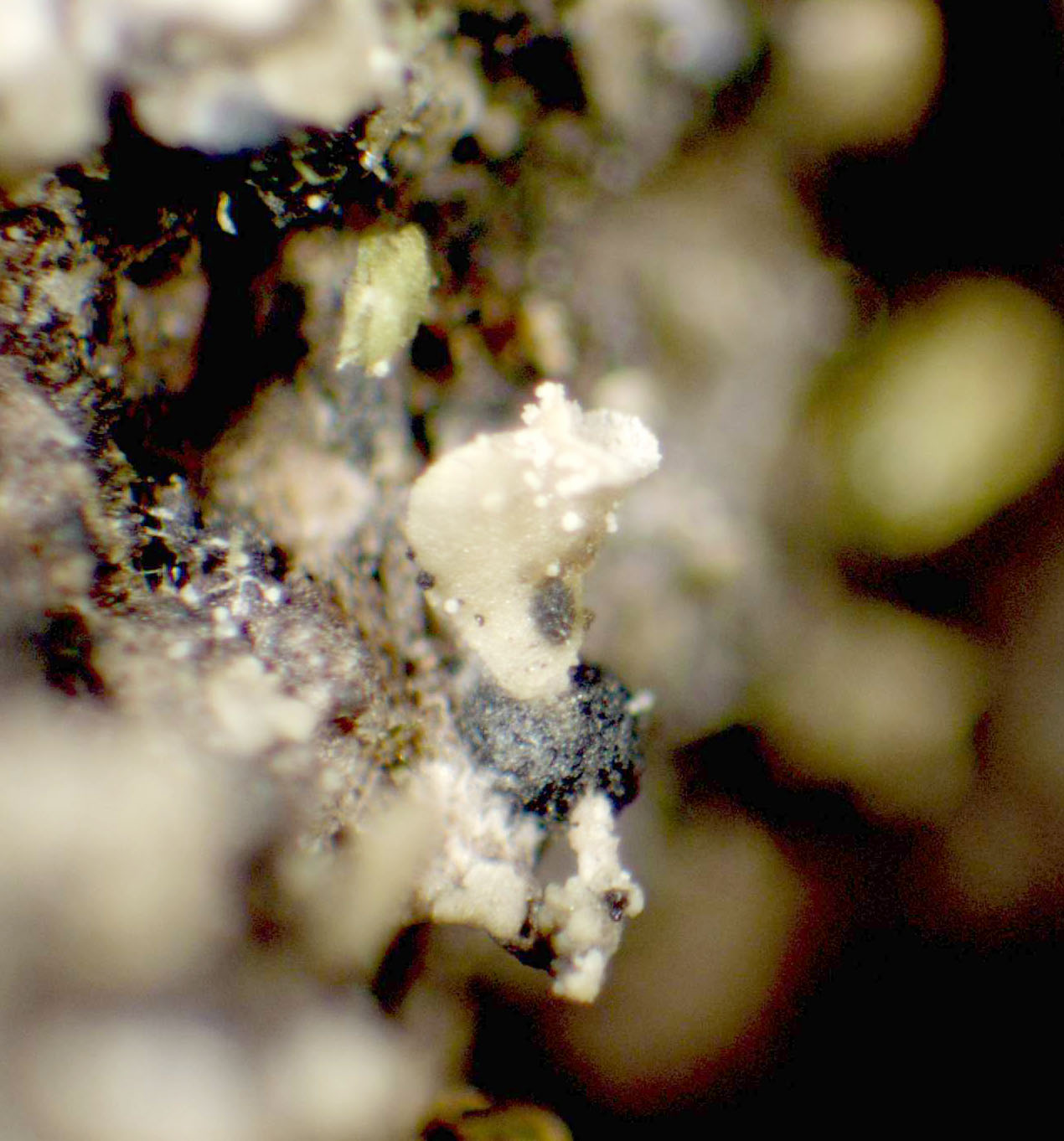

Scientific classification
- Kingdom: Fungi
- Division: Ascomycota
- Class: Lecanoromycetes
- Order: Lecanorales
- Family: Ramalinaceae
- Genus: Waynea
- Species: W. adscendens

Binomial name
- Waynea adscendens V.J.Rico (1991)

= Waynea adscendens =

Species of lichen-forming fungus

Waynea adscendens is a species of bark-dwelling squamulose lichen in the family Ramalinaceae. It was described as a new species in 1991 by the Spanish lichenologist Víctor Jiménez Rico. The type specimen was collected on the bark of Quercus rotundifolia in Spain. The lichen has since been recorded in France, Portugal, and Russia (Krasnodar Krai).
