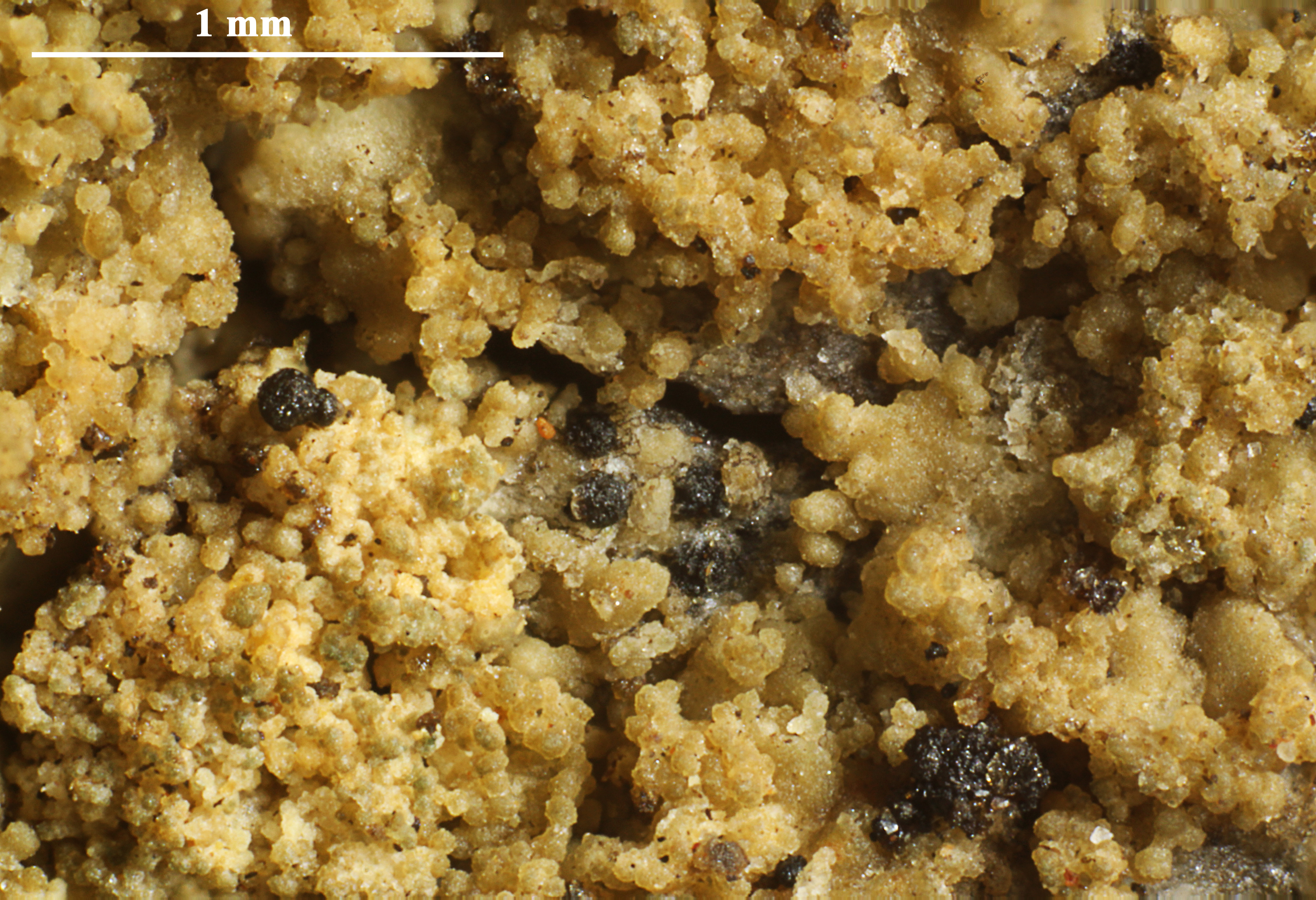
- scale bar = 1 mm

Scientific classification
- Domain: Eukaryota
- Kingdom: Fungi
- Division: Ascomycota
- Class: Eurotiomycetes
- Order: Verrucariales
- Family: Verrucariaceae
- Genus: Agonimia
- Species: A. octospora

Binomial name
- Agonimia octospora Coppins & P.James (1978)

= Agonimia octospora =

Species of lichen

Agonimia octospora is a species of corticolous, (bark-dwelling) squamulose (scaly) lichen in the family Verrucariaceae. This minute species has a thallus made of tiny pale grey-green squamules (scales) that are closely pressed to the bark of aged broadleaf trees, particularly oaks. It is distinguished from other members of the genus by features of its spores. The lichen occurs in ancient woodland habitats across parts of Europe and South America, showing a preference for minimally disturbed areas with abundant shrub coverage.

== Taxonomy ==
It was formally described as a new species in 1978 by the lichenologists Brian John Coppins and Peter Wilfred James. The type specimen was collected in Glengarriff Forest in (West Cork (Ireland), where it was found growing on the bark of oak. Characteristics of the lichen include its colourless ascospores that number eight per ascus, and its tiny squamules (up to 0.3 mm long) that are closely attached (appressed) to its substrate. Its spores typically measure 60–75 by 20–26 μm.

== Description ==
Agonimia octospora is a minute lichen species that forms small, scattered squamules (scale-like structures) on the bark of aged broadleaf trees, particularly oak trees. This species has several distinctive characteristics. The squamules are typically 0.05–0.1 mm thick and 0.05–0.25 mm wide, appearing pale grey-green when dry and brightening to a glaucous (bluish-green) colour when wet. These squamules are usually closely attached to the substrate, sometimes simple in form but occasionally irregularly divided or finger-like, with rounded or elongated shapes. Their margins may be entire or notched, and their upper surfaces are convex with a matte or slightly shiny appearance.

The reproductive structures (perithecia) are relatively rare, scattered among the squamules, and measure 0.5–0.8 mm in diameter. They are partially embedded in the substrate, appearing spherical or somewhat pear-shaped. These structures are black with a matt or slightly shiny surface that may be smooth or slightly roughened. The opening (ostiole) appears pink-grey in immature specimens but becomes black as the perithecia mature, and is often positioned off-centre.

Under microscopic examination, the squamules are composed mostly of pseudoparenchymatous tissue (cells arranged like a simple tissue) with only a few fungal filaments penetrating the substrate. The upper surface has a single cell-thick cortical layer with distinctive conical, peg-like projections measuring about 1–2 by 1–1.5 μm.

The wall of the perithecium comprise three distinct layers: an outer pigmented zone, an inner non-pigmented layer, and an innermost layer of inwardly directed, unbranched fungal strands. Each ascus (spore-producing structure) contains 8 colourless, ellipsoid spores that are densely muriform (divided by both transverse and longitudinal walls), typically measuring 60–75 by 20–26 μm.

== Habitat and distribution ==
The lichen is found in Europe and South America. In central Spain, A. octospora consistently appeared in minimally managed areas with dense shrub coverage and steeper terrain.
