= Waynea hirsuta =

Scientific classification
- Kingdom: Fungi
- Division: Ascomycota
- Class: Lecanoromycetes
- Order: Lecanorales
- Family: Ramalinaceae
- Genus: Waynea
- Species: W. hirsuta

Binomial name
- Waynea hirsuta Tretiach (1999)

Species of lichen

Waynea hirsuta is a species of squamulose lichen in the family Ramalinaceae. This sorediate lichen was described from specimens collected in the Tunkinsky District in the Lake Baikal region of central Siberia. The type material of W. hirsuta was collected on the bark of old Populus balsamifera trees growing within a closed stand of Pinus sibirica.

The lichen forms small, scale-like thalli whose squamules are densely clothed in colourless hairs—a feature that gives the species its name. The soralia are labriform (lip-like), and the ascospores are (0–)1(–3)-septate. In standard chemical spot tests the epithecium, excipulum, and upper cortex give positive reactions with K and with N. Waynea giraltiae also has hairy squamules, but its ascospores are 1-septate and somewhat shorter (10–15 x 2–2.4 μm) compared to W. hirsuta.
