= Waynea cretica =

Scientific classification
- Domain: Eukaryota
- Kingdom: Fungi
- Division: Ascomycota
- Class: Lecanoromycetes
- Order: Lecanorales
- Family: Ramalinaceae
- Genus: Waynea
- Species: W. cretica

Binomial name
- Waynea cretica Llop (2006)

Species of lichen

Waynea cretica is a species of corticolous (bark-dwelling), squamulose lichen in the family Ramalinaceae. It occurs on the Greek island of Crete and in Portugal.

== Taxonomy ==
The lichen was formally described as a new species in 2006 by Esteve Llop. The type specimen was collected by the author in the Diktamo gorge (Keramies, Chania); there, at an elevation of about 100–200 m (330–660 ft), it was found growing on a Cretan maple tree (Acer sempervirens). The species epithet refers to the type locality.

== Description ==
Waynea cretica has an olivaceous to greyish-green, dull thallus with squamules measuring 0.125–0.75 mm wide. It does not have a prothallus. The photobiont partner is green algae, which are present in a layer (benaeth the hypothecium) that is 25–50 μm thick containing spherical green cells with diameters between 5 and 10 μm. The medulla, measuring 15 μm thick, is made of loosely interwoven hyphae. Apothecia are biatorine in form with a colour ranging from whitish pink to greyish or reddish violet and a diameter of 0.2–0.45 mm. Ascospores are colourless, long and needle-shaped (acicular), typically with 7 septa, and measure 29–41 by 1.6–2.2 μm. Like other species of Waynea, it contains the pigment called Sedifolia-grey in the upper part of the hymenium; this pigment is also present in the outer exciple (the rim of the apothecia) and the upper cortex.

Waynea algarvensis, described from Portugal in 2012, is similar in morphology. It can be distinguished from Waynea cretica by its minute thallus parts (up to 5 mm), and its shorter squamules. Waynea algarvensis has only been recorded on Quercus rotundifolia.

== Habitat and distribution ==
On Crete, Waynea cretica is found in the thermo- to the meso-mediterranean belts at altitudes between 100 and 500 m (330 and 1,640 ft). These regions typically contain humid forest communities in ravines and canyons. The lichen has been recorded on the bark of Acer sempervirens, Old World sycamore (Platanus orientalis), and kermes oak (Quercus coccifera). Waynea cretica has since been recorded in several location in Algarve, Portugal.
