= Agonimia flabelliformis =

Scientific classification
- Kingdom: Fungi
- Division: Ascomycota
- Class: Eurotiomycetes
- Order: Verrucariales
- Family: Verrucariaceae
- Genus: Agonimia
- Species: A. flabelliformis

Binomial name
- Agonimia flabelliformis J.P.Halda, Czarnota & Guzow-Krzem. (2011)

Species of lichen

Agonimia flabelliformis is a species of corticolous (bark-dwelling) lichen in the family Verrucariaceae, first described in 2011 from specimens collected in the Czech Republic. It is distinguished from closely related species by its fan-shaped, finely branched growth form, appearing bright green when moist and pale brownish-green when dry. The species produces tiny, pear-shaped fruiting bodies containing clear, internally divided spores. Primarily found in shaded, humid forests, it occurs on tree bark, roots, rocks, and soil, often growing in association with mosses. A. flabelliformis has been reported from several European countries, eastern North America, and the Russian Far East.

== Taxonomy ==
The lichen was scientifically described as new to science in 2011 by Josef Halda, Paweł Czarnota, and Beata Guzow-Krzemińska. The type specimen was collected in the Gratzen Mountains (Czech Republic) at an elevation of 805 m (2,641 ft), where it was found growing on the bark of a beech tree. The thallus of the lichen consists of finger-like (dactyliform) to coral-like (coralloid) aggregations of goniocysts (clumps of photobiont cells surrounded by fungal hyphae) that form a roundish structure. The species epithet flabelliformis refers to the fan-shaped (flabellate) form of the thallus branches.

== Description ==
Agonimia flabelliformis has a small, scaly (squamulose) thallus. Its thallus is distinctive, with fan-shaped (flabelliform) or finely branching, coral-like projections (coralloid). The lobes are minute, ranging from 15 to 150 μm wide, and are formed from clusters of roundish green structures called goniocysts. These goniocysts consist of algal cells surrounded by fungal hyphae that form a clear, jelly-like cortex without the small bumps (papillae) found in similar species. The lichen appears bright green when moist and fades to a pale brownish-green when dry.

The fruiting bodies of the lichen, known as perithecia, initially appear round but sometimes become slightly pear-shaped as they mature. They measure between 150 and 250 μm in height and 150 to 200 μm in width, and have a dull, pale brown to greyish-brown surface. These perithecia do not possess an involucrellum, a protective external tissue seen in some lichens. Their openings (ostioles) are pale-coloured and relatively wide, measuring about 30–50 μm across. Internally, the perithecia have a three-layered wall (excipulum): an inner clear layer, a dark brown middle layer, and an outer colourless layer.

Inside the perithecia, club-shaped asci (structures holding spores) each contain eight spores. The spores themselves are colourless, oblong to ellipsoid in shape, with multiple internal divisions, measuring about 23–35 μm by 11–15 μm. Additionally, simple or segmented periphyses—tiny thread-like structures—line the inside of the perithecial openings. The lichen's photosynthetic partner (photobiont) is a green alga from the group Chlorophyta, consisting of roughly spherical (globose) cells about 8–12 μm in diameter. Pycnidia, another type of reproductive structure, have not been observed in this species. No secondary metabolites were detected through standard thin-layer chromatography analysis.

Although similar to Agonimia allobata, A. flabelliformis is readily distinguished by its unique flabelliform arrangement of goniocysts. Its fruiting bodies differ distinctly from Agonimia repleta, which possesses smaller, black, pear-shaped perithecia with a distinctly rough surface, and from Agonimia globulifera, known for shiny, sterile black globules and papillae-covered cortical cells.

== Habitat and distribution ==
The species has so far been recorded from shaded and humid habitats in the Czech Republic, Germany, and Great Britain, growing primarily on mossy bark at tree bases, roots, rocks, and occasionally on soil and decaying plant matter. It frequently associates with the moss Isothecium myosuroides but can also occur independently of mosses. It has also been recorded from Poland, Slovakia, and Lithuania. In addition to Europe, the lichen has also been recorded in eastern North America and the Russian Far East.
