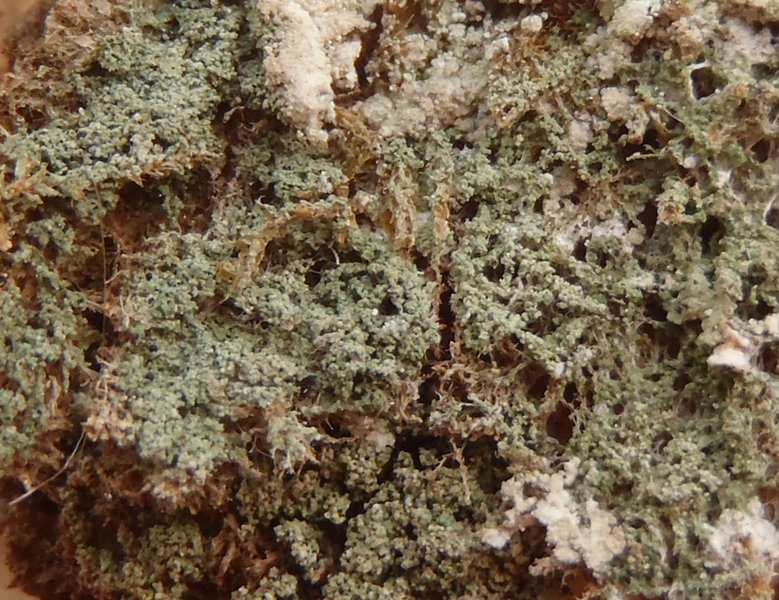
- Agonimia globulifera

Scientific classification
- Kingdom: Fungi
- Division: Ascomycota
- Class: Eurotiomycetes
- Order: Verrucariales
- Family: Verrucariaceae
- Genus: Agonimia; Zahlbr. (1909)

Type species
- Agonimia tristicula (Nyl.) Zahlbr. (1909)

Species
- See text

Synonyms
- Agonimiella H.Harada (1993); Marchandiomphalina Diederich, Manfr.Binder & Lawrey (2007)

= Agonimia =

Genus of lichen-forming fungi

Agonimia is a genus of lichen-forming fungi in the family Verrucariaceae. These lichens typically form crusts made of tiny grain-like clumps or small scale-like fragments on tree bark and rocks, with some species developing delicate leaf-like structures up to 5 mm across. The genus includes about 22 species found worldwide, characterized by their black flask-shaped reproductive structures and distinctive brick-patterned ascospores.

== Taxonomy ==
The genus was circumscribed by the lichenologist Alexander Zahlbruckner in 1909, with Agonimia tristicula assigned as the type species. Zahlbruckner characterized the genus by its squamulose thallus lacking rhizines, pyrenocarpic apothecia with a terminal pore, and large muriform spores that are brownish to dark brown. He noted the genus was closely related to Endocarpon but distinguished it primarily by the absence of hymenial algae and differences in the thallus structure.

== Description ==
Species of Agonimia grow as a crust that clings tightly to bark or rock. In most taxa this crust is built from tiny, grain-like clumps of algae and fungus (goniocysts), but some develop minute scale-like lobes (squamules) or even coral-like branches; one outlier forms delicate, leaf-like lobes up to 5 mm across. Where squamules are present their outer cells unite into a thin, skin-like layer (a pseudocortex) that may be tinged brown and often bears one or more small warts (papillae). In an extraordinary species these papillae stretch and fuse into stiff bristles. The thallus lacks the dead, protective epinecral film common in many lichens, except for a single species in which the outer cells collapse to leave a refractive crust. Squamules are usually fragile and crumble into powdery granules or irregular fragments that serve as asexual propagules; some species also shed blastidia—minute buds that break away—or produce structures resembling isidia or soredia. A distinct prothallus (a hyphal fringe at the margin) is absent or inconspicuous. The photosynthetic partner is a green algal cell of the chlorococcoid type, measuring roughly 4–13 × 3.5–7.5 μm.

Fruiting bodies are flask-shaped perithecia that appear black, or grey-brown if overlain by a thin unpigmented film, and sit between the squamules or grains. Each perithecium is nearly spherical to barrel-shaped; the usual dark cap (involucrellum) is missing, so its wall (exciple) grades seamlessly outward. That wall is thick and stratified: a pigmented outer zone of rounded cells, a middle layer of similar but colourless tissue, and an inner layer of compressed, clear cells. The brown pigments turn grey-brown, reddish-brown, or greenish in potassium hydroxide solution. Within, the hymenial gel stains weakly with iodine—red in strong solution, blue in dilute—a property termed hemiamyloid. Only short ostiolar threads (periphyses and periphysoids) line the neck; the longer interascal filaments found in many lichens are absent. The asci open by splitting their walls (fissitunicate), contain either two or eight spores, and show no iodine reaction. The ascospores are colourless, divided by multiple cross-walls (septa) into a brickwork pattern (muriform), and may brown slightly when over-mature. Asexual reproductive bodies (pycnidial conidiomata) are rare; when present they release rod-shaped, colourless conidia. Thin-layer chromatography has so far failed to detect any secondary metabolites.

== Species ==
As of June 2025, Species Fungorum (in the Catalogue of Life) accept 22 species of Agonimia:

- Agonimia abscondita P.M.McCarthy & Elix (2018) – Australia
- Agonimia allobata (Stizenb.) P.James (1992)
- Agonimia ascendens S.Y.Kondr., Lőkös & Hur (2018)
- Agonimia blumii S.Y.Kondr. (2015)
- Agonimia borysthenica Dymytrova, Breuss & S.Y.Kondr. (2011) – Ukraine
- Agonimia bryophilopsis (Vain.) Hafellner (2018)
- Agonimia cavernicola S.Y.Kondr., Lőkös & Hur (2015)
- Agonimia deguchii H.Harada (2013) – Japan
- Agonimia flabelliformis J.P.Halda, Czarnota & Guzow-Krzem. (2011) – Europe
- Agonimia foliacea (P.M.Jørg.) Lücking & B.Moncada (2017)
- Agonimia gelatinosa (Ach.) M.Brand & Diederich (1999)
- Agonimia globulifera M.Brand & Diederich (1999) – Europe
- Agonimia koreana Kashiw. & K.H.Moon (2008)
- Agonimia loekoesii S.Y.Kondr., J.P.Halda & Hur (2016)
- Agonimia octospora Coppins & P.James (1978)
- Agonimia opuntiella (Buschardt & Poelt) Vězda (1997)
- Agonimia repleta Czarnota & Coppins (2000) – Europe
- Agonimia sunchonensis S.Y.Kondr. & Hur (2018) – South Korea
- Agonimia tenuiloba Aptroot & M.Cáceres (2013) – Brazil
- Agonimia tristicula (Nyl.) Zahlbr. (1909)
- Agonimia vouauxii (B.de Lesd.) M.Brand & Diederich (1999)
- Agonimia yongsangensis S.Y.Kondr. & Hur (2018) – South Korea
