= Quercus congesta =

Conservation status
- Least Concern (IUCN 3.1)

Scientific classification
- Kingdom: Plantae
- Clade: Embryophytes
- Clade: Tracheophytes
- Clade: Spermatophytes
- Clade: Angiosperms
- Clade: Eudicots
- Clade: Rosids
- Order: Fagales
- Family: Fagaceae
- Genus: Quercus
- Subgenus: Quercus subg. Quercus
- Section: Quercus sect. Quercus
- Species: Q. congesta

Binomial name
- Quercus congesta C.Presl

Synonyms
- Synonymy: Quercus congesta var. acutiloba Guss.; Quercus congesta var. genuina Lojac.; Quercus congesta var. microbalana Lojac.; Quercus congesta var. oblongifolia Lojac.; Quercus congesta var. obtusiloba Guss.; Quercus humilis f. leptobalanus (Guss.) F.M.Vázquez; Quercus insularis Borzì; Quercus lanuginosa var. congesta (C.Presl) Gürke; Quercus lanuginosa subsp. congesta (C.Presl) Nyman; Quercus lanuginosa var. leptobalanus (Guss.) Gürke; Quercus leptobalanus Guss.; Quercus longiglandis Vuk.; Quercus minaae Lojac.; Quercus pubescens var. congesta (C.Presl) Strobl; Quercus robur var. congesta (C.Presl) Borzì; Quercus robur var. leptobalanus (Guss.) A.DC.; Quercus stenobalana Guss.; Quercus toza subsp. leptobalanus (Guss.) Nyman; Quercus ucriae Borzì; Quercus vulcanica var. nebrodensis Borzì

Species of oak tree

Quercus congesta is a species of oak endemic to southern Italy, including Sicily, Sardinia, and the southern Italian mainland.

== Description ==
Quercus congesta is a large tree, growing up to 20 metres tall.

== Range and habitat ==
Quercus congesta is endemic to Italy, where it is found on the islands of Sardinia and Sicily, and in Calabria on the southern Italian mainland. The species' estimated extent of occurrence (EOO) is over 140,000 km^{2}. It common in Sicily and Sardinia, and less common in Calabria.

Quercus congesta typically grows in mixed acidophilic forests.

== Conservation ==
The species is common, and its population is not declining. It faces potential threats from fire, deforestation, livestock grazing, and land development. Its conservation status is assessed as Least Concern.
