= Lago-Naki plateau =

Plateau in the Western Caucasus

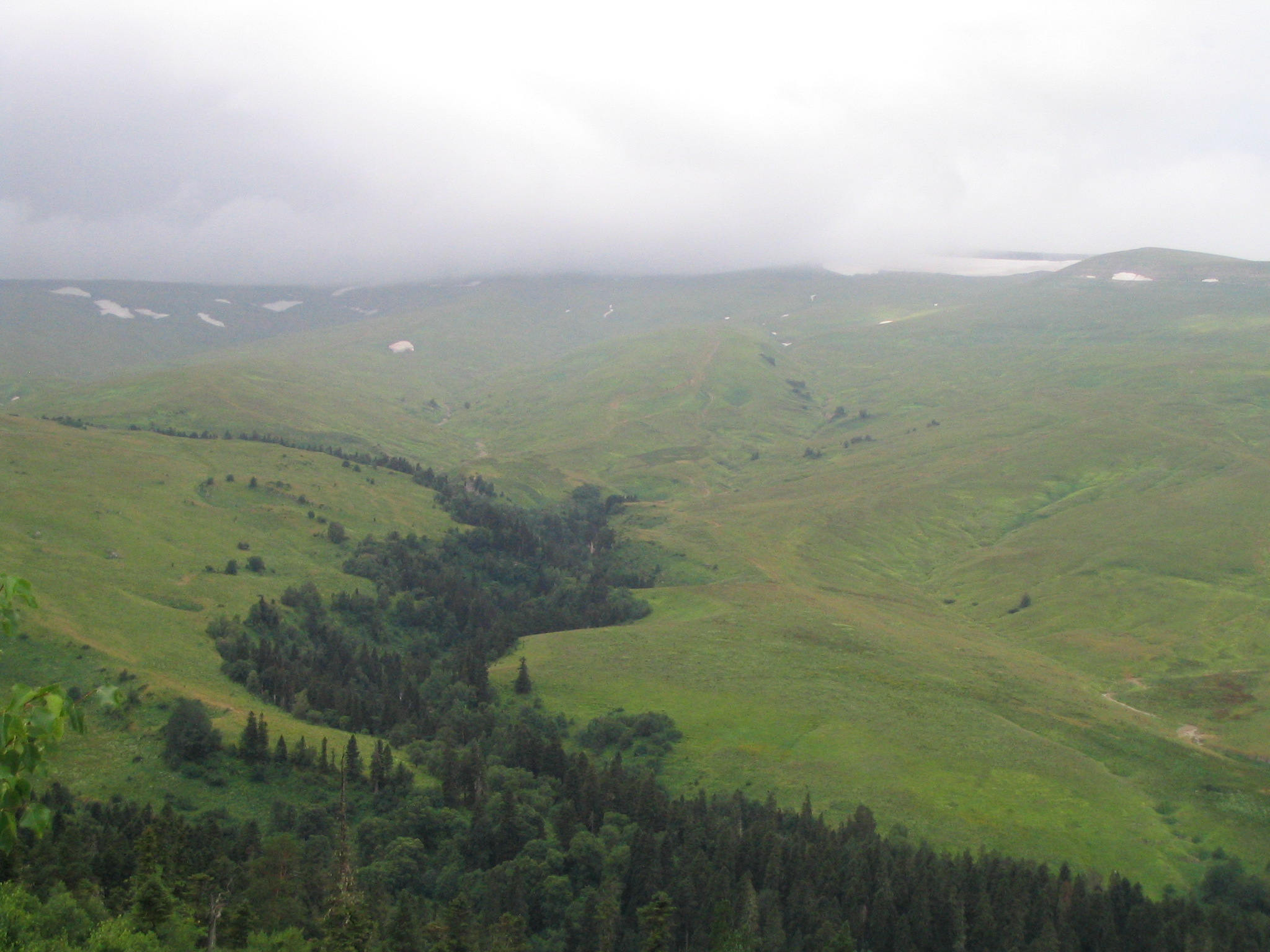
Lago-Naki in spring

The Lago-Naki plateau (Russian: Лаго-Наки) is a plateau in the Western Caucasus at an altitude of up to 2,200 meters known for its alpine meadows. Nearly all of it is within the Maykopsky District, Adygea, Russia.

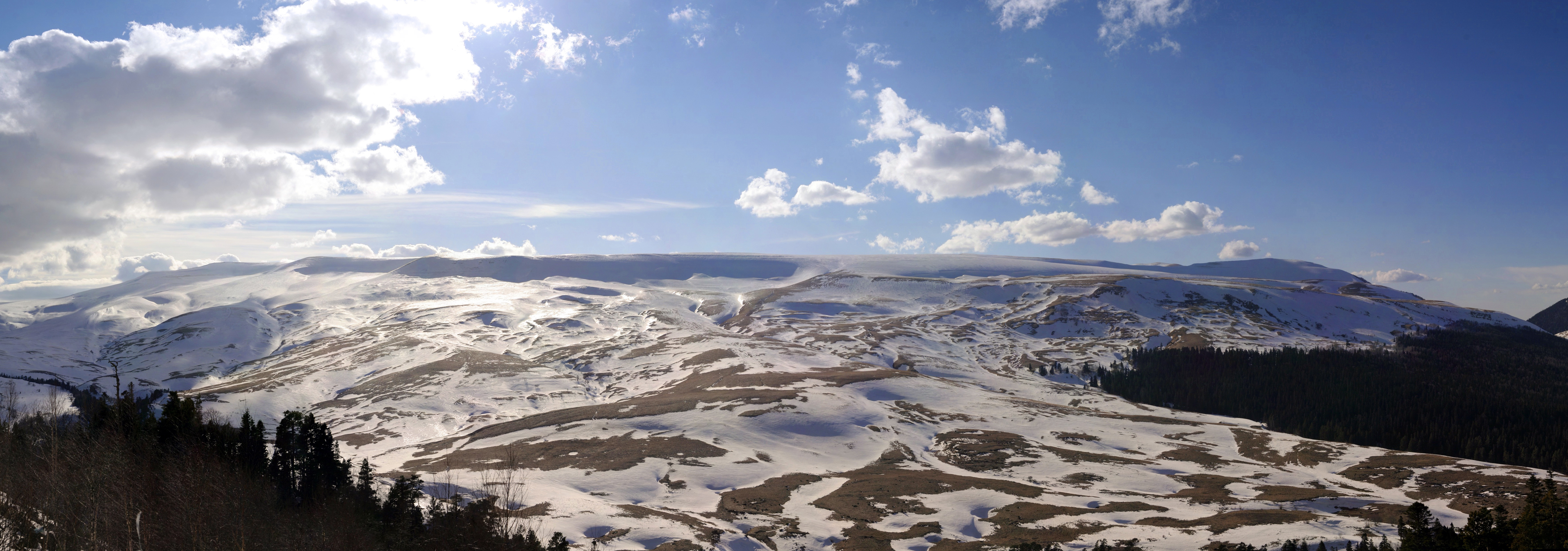
Lago-Naki in winter
