= Orange carotenoid N-terminal domain =

Carot_N
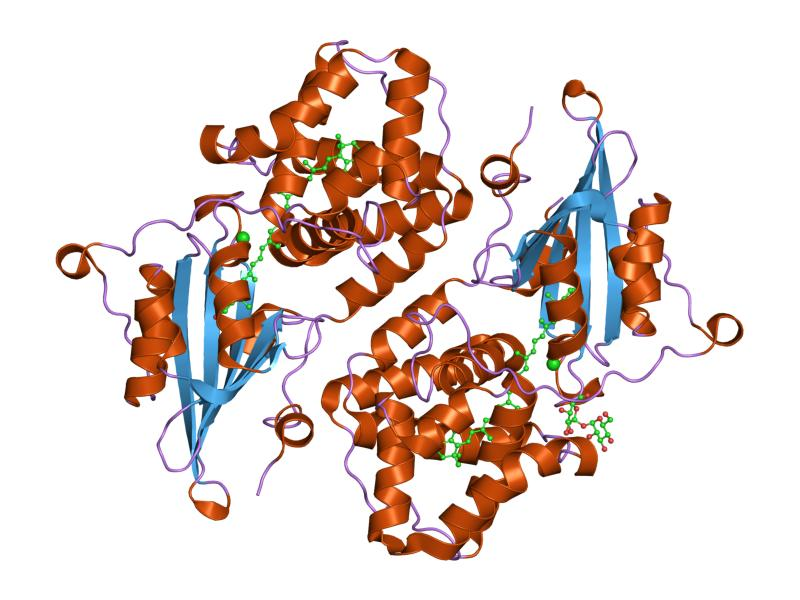
- crystal structure of orange carotenoid protein

Identifiers
- Symbol: Carot_N
- Pfam: PF09150
- InterPro: IPR015233
- SCOP2: 1m98 / SCOPe / SUPFAM
Available protein structures:
- Pfam: structures / ECOD
- PDB: RCSB PDB; PDBe; PDBj
- PDBsum: structure summary

In molecular biology the orange carotenoid N-terminal domain is a protein domain found predominantly at the N-terminus of the Orange carotenoid protein (OCP), and is involved in non-covalent binding of a carotenoid chromophore. It is unique for being present in soluble proteins, whereas the vast majority of domains capable of binding carotenoids are intrinsic membrane proteins. Thus far, it has exclusively been found in cyanobacteria, among which it is widespread. The domain also exists on its own, in uncharacterized cyanobacterial proteins referred to as "Red Carotenoid Protein" (RCP). The domain adopts an alpha-helical structure consisting of two four-helix bundles.

Orange carotenoid-binding proteins (OCP) were first identified in cyanobacterial species, where they occur associated with phycobilisome in the cellular thylakoid membrane. These proteins function in photoprotection, and are essential for non-photochemical quenching (NPQ). In full-length OCP, the NPQ activity is regulated by photoactivation by strong blue-green light. OCP seems to act as a homodimer, and binds one molecule of 3'-hydroxyechinenone (a ketocarotenoid) and one chloride ion per subunit. The carotenoid binding site is lined with a striking number of methionine residues. The N-terminal domain of OCP is usually accompanied by a C-terminal domain which belongs to the NTF2 superfamily and helps bind the carotenoid. OCP can be proteolytically cleaved into a red form (RCP), which lacks 15 residues from the N-terminus and approximately 150 residues from the C terminus. This domain is implicated in binding the phycobilisome complex, which thereby facilitates thermal dissipation (quenching) of excess absorbed light energy.

== See also ==
- NUTF2
- Orange Carotenoid Protein
- Carotenoprotein
- Fluorescence recovery protein
- NTF2 fold
