= Orange carotenoid protein =

Orange carotenoid-binding protein (Kerfeld et al., Structure 2003)
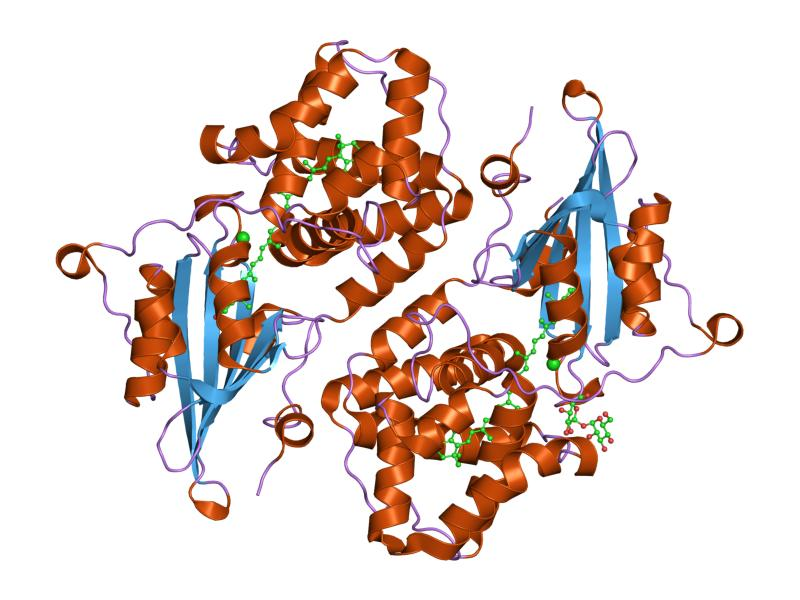
- Crystal structure of orange carotenoid protein (Kerfeld et al., Structure 2003)

Identifiers
- Organism: Arthrospira maxima
- Symbol: Ocp
- Alt. symbols: WP_006625883
- Orthologs: OMA: entry
- PDB: 1M98
- UniProt: P83689
Search for
- Structures: Swiss-model
- Domains: InterPro

Orange carotenoid protein (OCP) is a water-soluble protein which plays a role in photoprotection in diverse cyanobacteria. It is the only photoactive protein known to use a carotenoid as the photoresponsive chromophore. The protein consists of two domains, with a single keto-carotenoid molecule non-covalently bound between the two domains. It is a very efficient quencher of excitation energy absorbed by the primary light-harvesting antenna complexes of cyanobacteria, the phycobilisomes. The quenching is induced by blue-green light. It is also capable of preventing oxidative damage by directly scavenging singlet oxygen (^{1}O_{2}).

== History ==
OCP was first described in 1981 by Holt and Krogmann who isolated it from the unicellular cyanobacterium Arthrospira maxima, although its function would remain obscure until 2006. The crystal structure of the OCP was reported in 2003. At the same time the protein was shown to be an effective quencher of singlet oxygen and was suggested to be involved in photoprotection, or carotenoid transport. In 2000, it was demonstrated that cyanobacteria could perform photoprotective fluorescence quenching independent of lipid phase transitions, differential transmembrane pH, and inhibitors. The action spectrum for this quenching process suggested the involvement of carotenoids, and the specific involvement of the OCP was later demonstrated by Kirilovsky and coworkers in 2006. In 2008, OCP was shown to require photoactivation by strong blue-green light for its photoprotective quenching function. Photoactivation is accompanied by a pronounced color change, from orange to red, which had been previously observed by Kerfeld et al in the initial structural studies. In 2015 a combination of biophysical methods by researchers in Berkeley showed that the visible color change is the consequence of a 12Å translocation of the carotenoid.

== Physiological significance ==
For a long time, cyanobacteria were considered incapable of performing non-photochemical quenching (NPQ) as a photoprotective mechanism, relying instead on a mechanism of energy redistribution between the two photosynthetic reaction centers, PSII and PSI, known as "state transitions".

OCP is found in a majority of cyanobacterial genomes, with remarkable conservation of its amino acid sequence, implying evolutionary constraints to preserve an important function. Mutant cells engineered to lack OCP photobleach under high light and become photoinhibited more rapidly under fluctuating light. Under nutrient stress conditions, which are expected to be norm in marine environments, photoprotective mechanisms such as OCP become important even at lower irradiances.

This protein is not found in chloroplasts, and appears to be specific to cyanobacteria.

== Function ==
=== Photoactivity ===
Absorption spectrum of OCP in the inactive orange form vs the photoactivated red form

Upon illumination with blue-green light, OCP switches from an orange form (OCP^{O}) to a red form (OCP^{R}). The reversion of OCP^{R} to OCP^{O} is light independent and occurs slowly in darkness. OCP^{O} is considered the dark, stable form of the protein, and does not contribute to phycobilisome quenching. OCP^{R} is considered to be essential for induction of the photoprotection mechanism. The photoconversion from the orange to red form has a poor light efficiency (very low quantum yield), which helps to ensure the protein's photoprotective role only functions during high light conditions; otherwise, the dissipative NPQ process could unproductively divert light energy away from photosynthesis under light-limiting conditions.

=== Energy quenching ===
As evidenced by a decreased fluorescence, OCP in its red form is capable of dissipating absorbed light energy from the phycobilisome antenna complex. According to Rakhimberdieva and coworkers, about 30-40% of the energy absorbed by phycobilisomes does not reach the reaction centers when the carotenoid-induced NPQ is active. The exact mechanism and quenching site in both the carotenoid as well as the phycobilisome still remain uncertain. The linker polypeptide ApcE in the allophycocyanin (APC) core of the phycobilisomes is known to be important, but is not the site of quenching. Several lines of evidence suggest that it is the 660 nm fluorescence emission band of the APC core which is quenched by OCP^{R}. The temperature dependence of the rate of fluorescence quenching is similar to that of soluble protein folding, supporting the hypothesis that OCP^{O} slightly unfolds when it converts to OCP^{R}.

=== Singlet oxygen quenching ===
As first shown in 2003, the auxiliary function of carotenoids as quenchers of singlet oxygen contributes to the photoprotective role of OCP has also been demonstrated under strong orange-red light, which are conditions where OCP cannot be photoactivated for its energy-quenching role. This is significant because all oxygenic phototrophs have a particular risk of oxidative damage initiated by singlet oxygen (^{1}O_{2}), which is produced when their own light-harvesting pigments act as photosensitizers.

== Structure ==
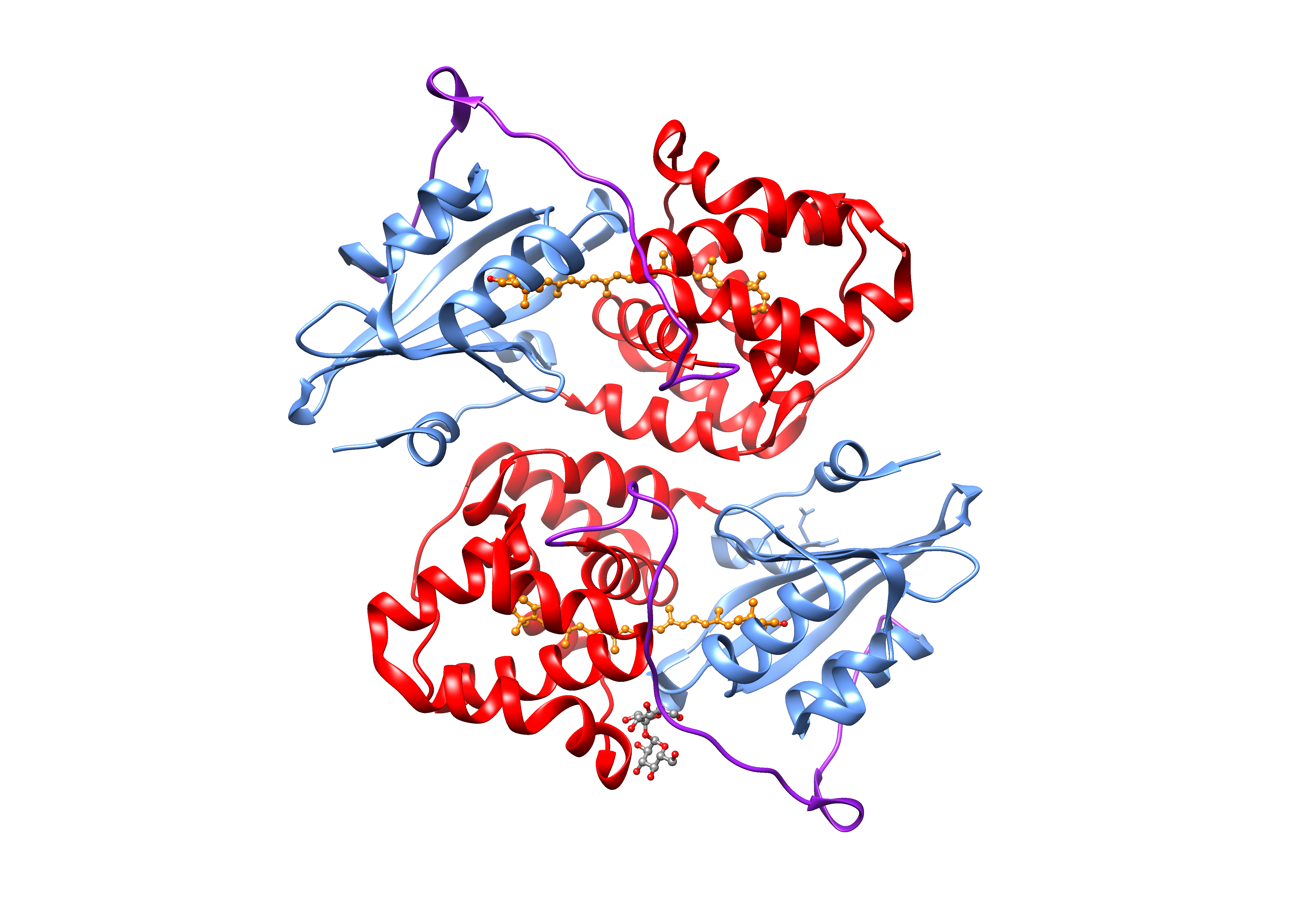
Ribbon view of the orange carotenoid protein molecular structure from Arthrospira maxima (PDB code 1M98).

=== 3D structure ===
The three-dimensional protein structure of OCP (in the OCP^{O} form) was solved in 2003, before its photoprotective role had been defined. The 35 kDa protein contains two structural domains: an all-α-helical N-terminal domain (NTD) consisting of two interleaved 4-helix bundles, and a mixed α/β C-terminal domain (CTD). The two domains are connected by an extended linker. In OCP^{O}, the carotenoid spans both domains, which are tightly associated in this form of protein. In 2013 Kerfeld and co-workers showed that the NTD is the effector (quencher) domain of the protein while the CTD plays a regulatory role.

=== Chromophore ===
OCP requires a keto-carotenoid for its functionality, such as 3'-hydroxyechinenone, echinenone or canthaxanthin. The carotenoid carbonyl group is crucial for OCP photoactivity, since this group forms a hydrogen bond with tryptophan and tyrosine residues located within the hydrophobic pocket of C-terminal domain of the protein. It is considered that the key structural event initiating the photoconversion sequence is the cleavage of this hydrogen bond. OCP can also bind other carotenoids, that do not contain the carbonyl group, such as zeaxanthin, but in this case it is not photoactive. Wild-type OCP from Arthrospira maxima, Microcystis aeruginosa, and Aphanizomenon flosaquae binds 3'-hydroxyechinenone. Wild-type OCP from Synechocystis sp. PCC 6803 binds mosty hydroxyechinenone (and about a 5% fraction of echinenone). Wild-type OCP from Tolypothrix sp. PCC 7601 binds mostly canthaxanthin (and about a 4% fraction of echinenone).

=== Protein–protein interactions ===
The OCP participates in key protein–protein interactions that are critical to its photoprotective function. The activated OCP^{R} form binds to allophycocyanin in the core of the phycobilisome and initiates the OCP-dependent photoprotective quenching mechanism. Another protein, the fluorescence recovery protein (FRP), interacts with the CTD in OCP^{R} and catalyzes the reaction which reverts it back to the OCP^{O} form. Because OCP^{O} cannot bind to the phycobilisome antenna, FRP effectively can detach OCP from the antenna and restore full light-harvesting capacity.

=== Evolution ===
The primary structure (amino acid sequence) is highly conserved among OCP sequences, and the full-length protein is usually co-located on the chromosome with a second open reading frame that was later characterized as the FRP. Often, biosynthetic genes for ketocarotenoid synthesis (e.g., CrtW) are nearby. These conserved functional linkages underscore the evolutionary importance of the OCP style of photoprotection for many cyanobacteria.

The first structure determination of the OCP coincided with the beginning of the genome sequencing era, and it was already apparent in 2003 that there is also a variety of evolutionarily related genes which encode proteins with only one of the two domains present in OCP. The N-terminal domain (NTD), "Carot_N", is found only in cyanobacteria, but exhibits a considerable amount of gene duplication. The C-terminal domain (CTD), however, is homologous with the widespread NTF2 superfamily, which shares a protein fold with its namesake, nuclear transport factor 2, as well as around 20 other subfamilies of proteins with functions as diverse as limonene-1,2-epoxide hydrolase, SnoaL polyketide cyclase, and delta-5-3-ketosteroid isomerase (KSI). Most, if not all, of the members of the NTF2 superfamily form oligomers, often using the surface of their beta sheet to interact with another monomer or other protein.

Bioinformatic analyses carried out over the past 15 years has resulted in the identification of new groups of carotenoid proteins: In addition to new families of the OCP, there are HCPs and CCPs that correspond to the NTD and CTD of the OCP, respectively. Based on the primary structure, the HCPs can be subdivided into at least nine evolutionarily distinct clades, each binds carotenoid. The CCPs resolve into 2 major groups, and these proteins also bind carotenoid. Given these data, and the ability to devolve OCP into its two component domains while retaining function has led to a reconstruction of the evolution of the OCP.

== Applications ==
Its water-solubility, together with its status as the only known photoactive protein containing a carotenoid, makes the OCP a valuable model for studying solution-state energetic and photophysical properties of carotenoids, which are a diverse class of molecules found across all domains of life. Moreover, carotenoids are widely investigated for their properties as anti-oxidants, and thus the protein may serve as a template for delivery of carotenoids for therapeutic purposes in human medicine.

Because of its high efficiency of fluorescence quenching, coupled to its low quantum yield of photoactivation by specific wavelengths of light, OCP has ideal properties as a photoswitch and has been proposed as a novel system for developing optogenetics technologies and may have other applications in optofluidics and biophotonics.

== See also ==
- Photoprotection
- Xanthophylls
- Biological pigments
- Orange carotenoid N-terminal domain
- Phycobilisome
- Fluorescence recovery protein
- Photosynthetic state transition
- Ketocarotenoids
