= Padimate =

Padimate may refer to:

- Padimate A
- Padimate O
