= Escalol =

Escalol is the trade name of a number of UV absorbers:

- Avobenzone (Escalol 517)
- Oxybenzone (Escalol 567)
- Padimate A (Escalol 506)
- Padimate O (Escalol 507)
