= Krogmann =

Krogmann is a German surname. Notable people with the surname include:

- Carl Vincent Krogmann (1889–1978), German banker, industrialist, and politician
- David Krogmann (1934–2016), American biologist
- Georg Krogmann (1886–1915), German footballer
- Jürgen Krogmann (born 1963), German politician (SPD)
- Werner Krogmann (1901–1954), German sailor
- Willy Krogmann (1905–1967), German philologist

== See also ==
- Krogman
