= C40H54O2 =

The molecular formula C_{40}H_{54}O_{2} (molar mass: 566.85 g/mol, exact mass: 566.4124 u) may refer to:

- Diatoxanthin
- 3'-Hydroxyechinenone
