= FRPS =

FRPS may refer to:

- Familial rectal pain syndrome, the original name for the paroxysmal extreme pain disorder
- Fellow of the Royal Photographic Society
- Flora Republicae Popularis Sinicae
- Fall River Public Schools

== See also ==
- FRP (disambiguation)
