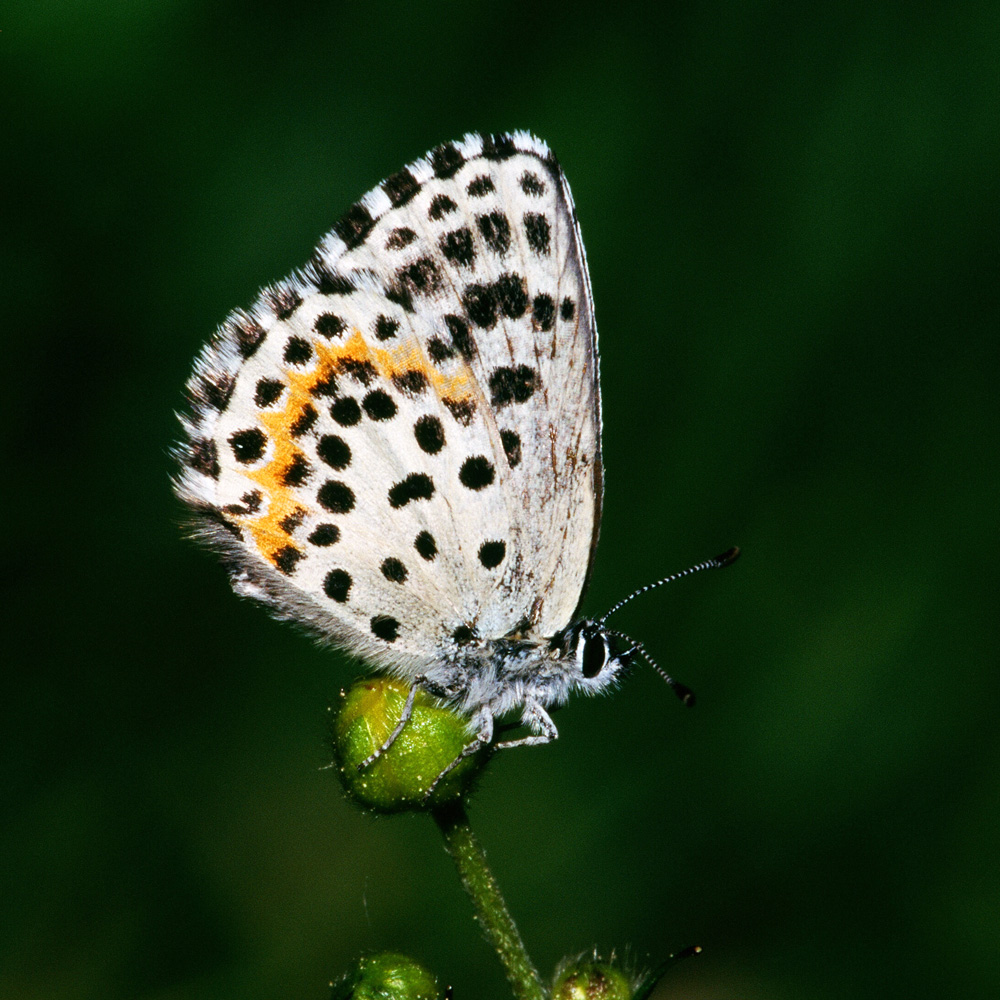

Scientific classification
- Kingdom: Animalia
- Phylum: Arthropoda
- Clade: Pancrustacea
- Class: Insecta
- Order: Lepidoptera
- Family: Lycaenidae
- Genus: Scolitantides
- Species: S. orion

Binomial name
- Scolitantides orion (Pallas, 1771)

Synonyms
- Papilio orion Pallas, 1771; Papilio battus [Schiffermüller], 1775; Papilio telephii Esper, 1778; Papilio sedi Fabricius, 1781; Polyommatus hecateus Drapier, 1819; Scolitantides ultraornata Verity, 1937

= Scolitantides orion =

Species of butterfly

Scolitantides orion, the chequered blue, is a species of butterfly in the family Lycaenidae (gossamer-winged butterflies). It is found in Europe, Russia and east across the Palearctic to Japan.

== Subspecies ==
- S. o. orion Europe (Greece, North Macedonia and Bulgaria), Russia, Caucasus, central Siberia, Transbaikalia, Russian Far East
- S. o. jezoensis (Matsumura, 1919) Amur Oblast, Ussuri, Sakhalin, Hokkaido
- S. o. johanseni (Wnukowsky, 1934) northern China and Altai Mountains northern Tien-Shan, Dzungarian Alatau, Sayan Mountains
- S. o. lariana (Fruhstorfer, 1910) French Alps, Corsica, northern Italy to Greece
- S. o. parvula De Sagarra 1926 Spain and France
- S. o. ultraornata Verity, 1937 Scandinavia
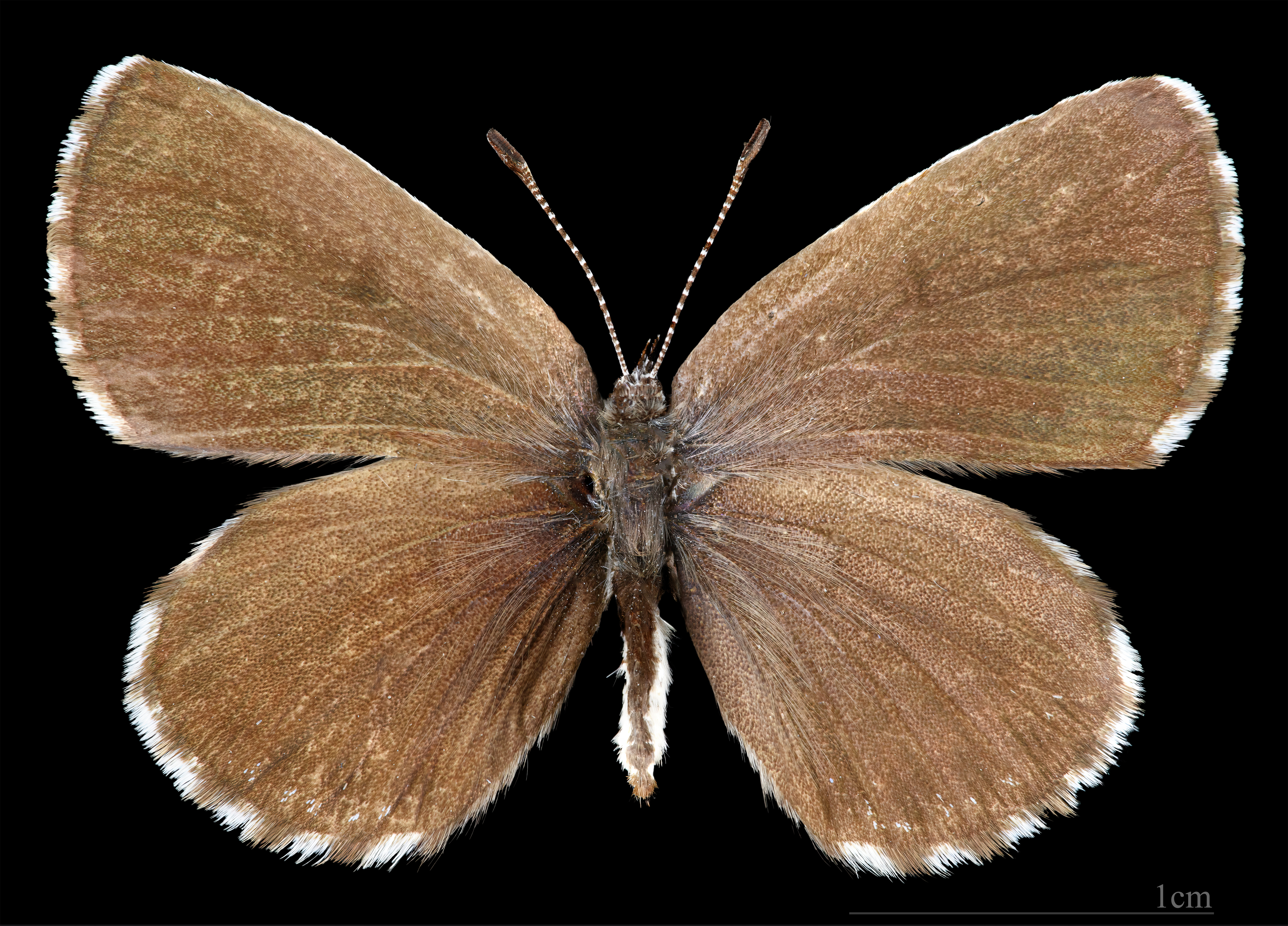
Scolitantides o. orion ♀

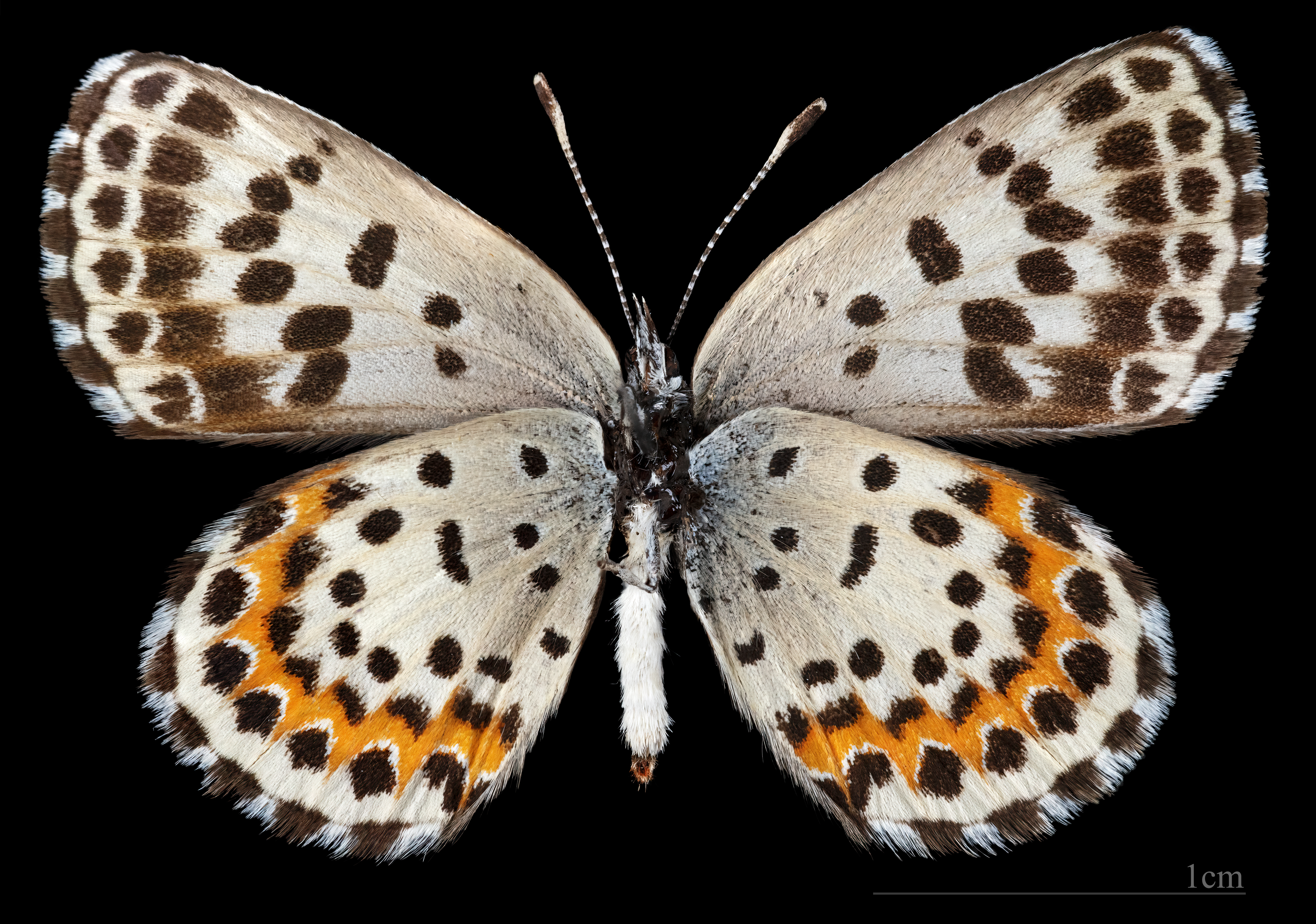
Scolitantides o. orion ♀ △

The male is 13 to 16 mm. In France there is usually a single generation flying in May and June, sometimes there are two generations May then September. The butterfly lives in rocky areas up to 1000 m of altitude, on plants such as Sedum telephium and Sedum album.

== Description in Seitz ==
Above and beneath rather similar to Pseudophilotes baton but larger and darker, recognizable by the fringes being very distinctly spotted and the white underside abundantly and heavily spotted with black, the hindwing beneath bearing a bright orange-red submarginal band. Throughout Europe, western and northern Asia, excepting England, the Arctic countries and Japan; from Finland to the Mediterranean islands and from the Atlantic to the Pacific.

- ab. nigra Gerh. occurs everywhere among ordinary specimens and is the prevalent form in some districts, e. g. in the Valais; differs in the uniformly dark upperside, on which only the discocellular spot is visible
- ab. ornata Stgr. is very blue above, such specimens being found singly in Europe and as a regular spring form in eastern Asia.
- orithyia Gr.-Grsh. are specimens from the Sinin Mountains in northern Tibet, which form a transition to ornata. The light blue marginal rings characteristic of ornata being entirely or nearly absent. Egg flattened, white. Larva light green with black head and black spiracles; the first ring, a lateral stripe, the dorsal line and a row of spots on each side of the dorsal line carmine; in the autumn and in the south again in June, on species of Sedum; often guarded by ants. Pupa dirty yellow, greenish at the wing-cases, fastened either on the ground or above it on plants, sometimes a number together. The butterflies in the early spring (emerging in a warm room already in February according to Tumma), and in the south again in August, very local, being absent from large districts, but generally not rare, particularly on chalk in stony places. In China, Korea and Amurland the species is much more generally distributed than in Europe, but always confined to the (rocky) localities of the food plant.

== By nation ==
In Norway, there are about 50 of these butterflies in the wild; As of 2022 they have for the last years only been found in the wild in the Halden area.

== Etymology ==
Named in the Classical tradition. Orion is a legendary Boeotian hunter who, after his death, was turned into a constellation by Zeus.
