= Photoprotection =

Biochemical process

Photoprotection is the biochemical process that helps organisms cope with molecular damage caused by sunlight. Plants and other oxygenic phototrophs have developed a suite of photoprotective mechanisms to prevent photoinhibition and oxidative stress caused by excess or fluctuating light conditions. Humans and other animals have also developed photoprotective mechanisms to avoid UV photodamage to the skin, prevent DNA damage, and minimize the downstream effects of oxidative stress.

== In photosynthetic organisms ==
In organisms that perform oxygenic photosynthesis, excess light may lead to photoinhibition, or photoinactivation of the reaction centers, a process that does not necessarily involve chemical damage. When photosynthetic antenna pigments such as chlorophyll are excited by light absorption, unproductive reactions may occur by charge transfer to molecules with unpaired electrons. Because oxygenic phototrophs generate O_{2} as a byproduct from the photocatalyzed splitting of water (H_{2}O), photosynthetic organisms have a particular risk of forming reactive oxygen species.

Therefore, a diverse suite of mechanisms has developed in photosynthetic organisms to mitigate these potential threats, which become exacerbated under high irradiance, fluctuating light conditions, in adverse environmental conditions such as cold or drought, and while experiencing nutrient deficiencies which cause an imbalance between energetic sinks and sources.

In eukaryotic phototrophs, these mechanisms include non-photochemical quenching mechanisms such as the xanthophyll cycle, biochemical pathways which serve as "relief valves", structural rearrangements of the complexes in the photosynthetic apparatus, and use of antioxidant molecules. Higher plants sometimes employ strategies such as reorientation of leaf axes to minimize incident light striking the surface. Mechanisms may also act on a longer time-scale, such as up-regulation of stress response proteins or down-regulation of pigment biosynthesis, although these processes are better characterized as "photoacclimatization" processes.

Cyanobacteria possess some unique strategies for photoprotection which have not been identified in plants nor in algae. For example, most cyanobacteria possess an Orange Carotenoid Protein (OCP), which serves as a novel form of non-photochemical quenching. Another unique, albeit poorly-understood, cyanobacterial strategy involves the IsiA chlorophyll-binding protein, which can aggregate with carotenoids and form rings around the PSI reaction center complexes to aid in photoprotective energy dissipation. Some other cyanobacterial strategies may involve state-transitions of the phycobilisome antenna complex , photoreduction of water with the Flavodiiron proteins, and futile cycling of CO_{2} .

== In plants ==
It is widely known that plants need light to survive, grow and reproduce. It is often assumed that more light is always beneficial; however, excess light can actually be harmful for some species of plants. Just as animals require a fine balance of resources, plants require a specific balance of light intensity and wavelength for optimal growth (this can vary from plant to plant). Optimizing the process of photosynthesis is essential for survival when environmental conditions are ideal and acclimation when environmental conditions are severe. When exposed to high light intensity, a plant reacts to mitigate the harmful effects of excess light.

Plants are delicately able to obtain sufficient solar light for photosynthesis while preventing the damage it could cause. While chlorophyll is very efficient in absorbing visible light for photosynthesis, no photosynthetic organism can use all this energy in full sunlight. Moreover, stresses in the environment, such as extreme temperatures in winter and summer, high salinity, and low moisture or nutrients, also decrease photosynthesis.

Plant photoprotection has three main levels. One is the reflection or screening of light. This may involve leaf senescence in stress conditions. Second is conversion of light energy into heat. As a powerful method, ranging from seconds to seasons, it is used only in excessive light conditions, maximizing absorbed light for photosynthesis. Similarly, infrared radiation from the sun is given as heat from heating water in plant cells; it is not a hazard except in extreme heat or when unable to evaporatively cool itself. Therefore the principal threat to leaves is found in visible light. Thirdly, and most importantly, is detoxification of toxic radicals from too much light. If light is not channeled into photochemistry, it can leave behind excessive energy from either chlorophyll or the electron transport chain. This can lead to reactive oxygen species, which can damage molecules such as DNA, proteins, and lipids in cell membranes, or even cell death. Such effects are even more severe when there are stressors. The reactive oxygen species are detoxified by antioxidant enzymes and metabolites (e.g., vitamins C and E) prior to reaction with other molecules. While this anti-oxidation method is ubiquitous among plants, it is most common when light changes temporarily override heat dissipation. When antioxidant enzymes are inhibited, as in low-temperature winter stress conditions, so is detoxification of oxygen. Heat must therefore be generated to decrease light levels when excessive, but not when sufficient, which would interfere with photosynthesis; these processes are exquisitely coordinated.

To best protect themselves from excess light, plants employ a multitude of methods to minimize harm inflicted by excess light. A variety of photoreceptors are used by plants to detect light intensity, direction and duration. In response to excess light, some photoreceptors have the ability to shift chloroplasts within the cell farther from the light source thus decreasing the harm done by superfluous light. Likewise, leaves themselves can grow or move in order to decrease absorption when in maximum exposure. Similarly, plants are able to produce enzymes that are essential to photoprotection such as Anthocyanin synthase. Plants deficient in photoprotection enzymes are much more sensitive to light damage than plants with functioning photoprotection enzymes. Also, plants produce a variety of secondary metabolites beneficial for their survival and protection from excess light. These secondary metabolites that provide plants with protection are commonly used in human sunscreen and pharmaceutical drugs to supplement the inadequate light protection that is innate to human skin cells. Various pigments and compounds can be employed by plants as a form of UV photoprotection as well, including those in the cuticle, epidermis, and hairs on the outer surface of the leaf. This is important since this can cause damage to DNA and proteins, and UV radiation is not used in photosynthesis.

A key player in this function is the xanthophyll cycle, which is composed of a set of carotenoids, known as xanthophylls, alternate between conditions of light intensity or stress. When light is at low levels, photosynthesis increases proportionally with the increase in light, until it reaches saturation. When light increases beyond that point or stress increases, a conversion of xanthophylls occurs, i.e., from violaxantin to antheraxanthin to zeaxanthin. The reverse happens when light is lesser or stress is absent. Light saturation also causes torsion of a protein in the chlorophyll pigment bed, which is thought to help safely dissipate heat by positioning the zeaxanthin molecule adjacent to chlorophyll. Energy was originally thought to proceed directly from chlorophyll to zeaxanthin to allow for thermal dissipation, but it has now been discovered that there may be a rapid electron exchange that can help dissipate heat. As light becomes more excessive, both zeaxanthin and heat dissipation increase proportionally with it. Levels of zeaxanthin and antheraxanthin increase from dawn to midday and then decrease toward dusk. Plants with greater heat dissipation (and hence greater dissipating pigments) are less efficient at photosynthesis, i.e., use less of the total absorbed light toward photosynthesis. If light conditions vary rapidly, photoprotection will adjust accordingly, leading to rapid increase dissipation in high light and rapid increase of efficient photosynthesis in low light; the pigments likewise are rapidly engaged and disengaged. Such measures can used for longer units of time such as days or even seasons. For example, leaves in full sunlight are better at dissipating heat and have more xanthophyll cycle carotenoids than leaves in shade conditions. Moreover, in the winter, low temperatures inhibit photosynthesis (and sometimes even along with internal regulation in such plants as conifers), there is inhibition of conversion of zeaxanthin to violaxanthin, and zeaxanthin could be fixed (possibly with the help of proteins) causing constant photoprotection throughout the day. High levels of zeaxanthin and antheraxanthin persist the entire day and night and photosynthetic efficiency is very low. Some biennial and annual species, e.g., winter cereals and winter-active herbaceous weeds, keep high amounts of photosynthesis during the winter and grow during intermittent warmer periods. But many evergreens shut down winter growth and photosynthesis, due to breakdown of a few major photosynthetic proteins, to prevent transfer of excess energy (from an excited electron) to oxygen. Furthermore. zeaxanthin performs this same role of excess energy from chlorophyll to oxygen. Together these processes prevent danger of light absorption during winter stress. In the spring, photosynthesis can be resumed.

Pigmentation is one method employed by a variety of plants as a form of photoprotection. For example, in Antarctica, native mosses of green color can be found naturally shaded by rocks or other physical barriers while red colored mosses of the same species are likely to be found in wind and sun exposed locations. This variation in color is due to light intensity. Photoreceptors in mosses, phytochromes (red wavelengths) and phototropins (blue wavelengths), assist in the regulation of pigmentation. To better understand this phenomenon, Waterman et al. conducted an experiment to analyze the photoprotective qualities of UVACs (Ultraviolet Absorbing Compounds) and red pigmentation in antarctic mosses. Moss specimens of species Ceratodon purpureus, Bryum pseudotriquetrum and Schistidium antarctici were collected from an island region in East Antarctica. All specimens were then grown and observed in a lab setting under constant light and water conditions to assess photosynthesis, UVAC and pigmentation production. Moss gametophytes of red and green varieties were exposed to light and consistent watering for a period of two weeks. Following the growth observation, cell wall pigments were extracted from the moss specimens. These extracts were tested using UV–Vis spectrophotometry which uses light from the UV and visible spectrum to create an image depicting light absorbance. UVACs are typically found in the cytoplasm of the cell; however, when exposed to high-intensity light, UVACs are transported into the cell wall. It was found that mosses with higher concentrations of red pigments and UVACs located in the cell walls, rather than intracellularly, performed better in higher intensity light. Color change in the mosses was found not to be due to chloroplast movement within the cell. It was found that UVACs and red pigments function as long-term photoprotection in Antarctic mosses. Therefore, in response to high-intensity light stress, the production of UVACs and red pigmentation is up-regulated.

Knowing that plants are able to differentially respond to varying concentrations and intensities of light, it is essential to understand why these reactions are important. Due to a steady rise in global temperatures in recent years, many plants have become more susceptible to light damage. Many factors including soil nutrient richness, ambient temperature fluctuation and water availability all impact the photoprotection process in plants. Plants exposed to high light intensity coupled with water deficits displayed a significantly inhibited photoprotection response. Although not yet fully understood, photoprotection is an essential function of plants.

== In humans ==
Photoprotection of the human skin is achieved by extremely efficient internal conversion of DNA, proteins and melanin. Internal conversion is a photochemical process that converts the energy of the UV photon into small, harmless amounts of heat. If the energy of the UV photon were not transformed into heat, then it would lead to the generation of free radicals or other harmful reactive chemical species (e.g. singlet oxygen, or hydroxyl radical).

In DNA this photoprotective mechanism evolved four billion years ago at the dawn of life. The purpose of this extremely efficient photoprotective mechanism is to prevent direct DNA damage and indirect DNA damage. The ultrafast internal conversion of DNA reduces the excited state lifetime of DNA to only a few femtoseconds (10^{−15}s)—this way the excited DNA does not have enough time to react with other molecules.

For melanin this mechanism has developed later in the course of evolution. Melanin is such an efficient photoprotective substance that it dissipates more than 99.9% of the absorbed UV radiation as heat. This means that less than 0.1% of the excited melanin molecules will undergo harmful chemical reactions or produce free radicals.

== Synthetic Melanocyte-stimulating hormone ==
In the European Union and United States, afamelanotide is indicated for the prevention of phototoxicity in adults with erythropoietic protoporphyria. Afamelanotide is also being investigated as a method of photoprotection from in the treatment of polymorphous light eruption, actinic keratosis and squamous cell carcinoma (a form of skin cancer).

== Artificial melanin ==
The cosmetic industry claims that the UV filter acts as an "artificial melanin". But those artificial substances used in sunscreens do not efficiently dissipate the energy of the UV photon as heat. Instead these substances have a very long excited state lifetime. In fact, the substances used in sunscreens are often used as photosensitizers in chemical reactions. (see Benzophenone).

Oxybenzone, titanium oxide and octyl methoxycinnamate are photoprotective agents used in many sunscreens, providing broad-spectrum UV coverage, including UVB and short-wave UVA rays.

UV-absorber	other names	percentage of molecules that dissipate the photon energy (quantum yield: Φ )	molecules not dissipating the energy quickly
DNA		> 99.9%	< 0.1%
natural melanin		> 99.9%	< 0.1%
2-phenylbenzimidazole-5-sulfonic acid	PBSA, Eusolex 232, Parsol HS,		
2-ethylhexyl 4-dimethylaminobenzoate	Padimate-O, oxtyldimethyl PABA, OD-PABA	0.1 = 10%	90%
4-Methylbenzylidene camphor	(4-MBC), (MBC), Parsol 5000, Eusolex 6300	0.3 = 30%	70%
4-tert-butyl-4-methoxydibenzoyl-methane	(BM-DBM), Avobenzone, Parsol 1789, Eusolex 9020		
Menthyl Anthranilate	(MA), Menthyl-2-aminobenzoate, meradimate	0.6 = 60%	40%
Ethylhexyl methoxycinnamate	(2-EHMC), (EHMC), EMC, Octyl methoxycinnamate, OMC, Eusolex 2292, Parsol	0.81 = 81%	19%

== See also ==
- Sunscreen
- Photocarcinogen
- Direct DNA damage
- Indirect DNA damage
