= Kautsky effect =

In biophysics, the Kautsky effect (also fluorescence transient, fluorescence induction or fluorescence decay) is a phenomenon consisting of a typical variation in the behavior of a plant fluorescence when exposed to light. It was discovered in 1931 by H. Kautsky and A. Hirsch.

When dark-adapted photosynthesising cells are illuminated with continuous light, chlorophyll fluorescence displays characteristic changes in intensity accompanying the induction of photosynthetic activity.

== Application of Kautsky effect ==
The quantum yield of photosynthesis, which is also the photochemical quenching of fluorescence, is calculated through the following equation:

Φ_{p} = (F_{m}-F_{0})/F_{m} = F_{v}/F_{m}

F_{0} is the low fluorescence intensity, which is measured by a short light flash that is not strong enough to cause photochemistry, and thus induces fluorescence. F_{m} is the maximum fluorescence that can be obtained from a sample by measuring the highest intensity of fluorescence after a saturating flash. The difference between the measured values is the variable fluorescence F_{v}.

== Explanation ==
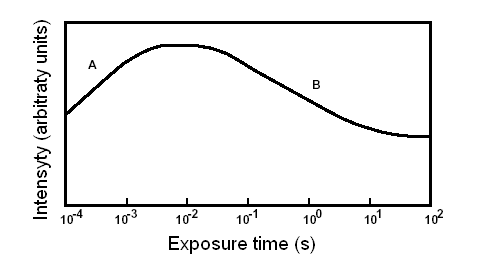
The Kautsky effect

When a sample (leaf or algal suspension) is illuminated, the fluorescence intensity increases with a time constant in the microsecond or millisecond range. After a few seconds the intensity decreases and reaches a steady-state level. The initial rise of the fluorescence intensity is attributed to the progressive saturation of the reaction centers of photosystem 2 (PSII). Therefore, photochemical quenching increases with the time of illumination, with a corresponding increase of the fluorescence intensity. The slow decrease of the fluorescence intensity at later times is caused, in addition to other processes, by non-photochemical quenching. Non-photochemical quenching is a protection mechanism in photosynthetic organisms as they have to avoid the adverse effect of excess light. Which components contribute and in which quantities remains an active but controversial area of research. It is known that carotenoids and the special pigment pairs (e.g. P700) have functions in photoprotection.
