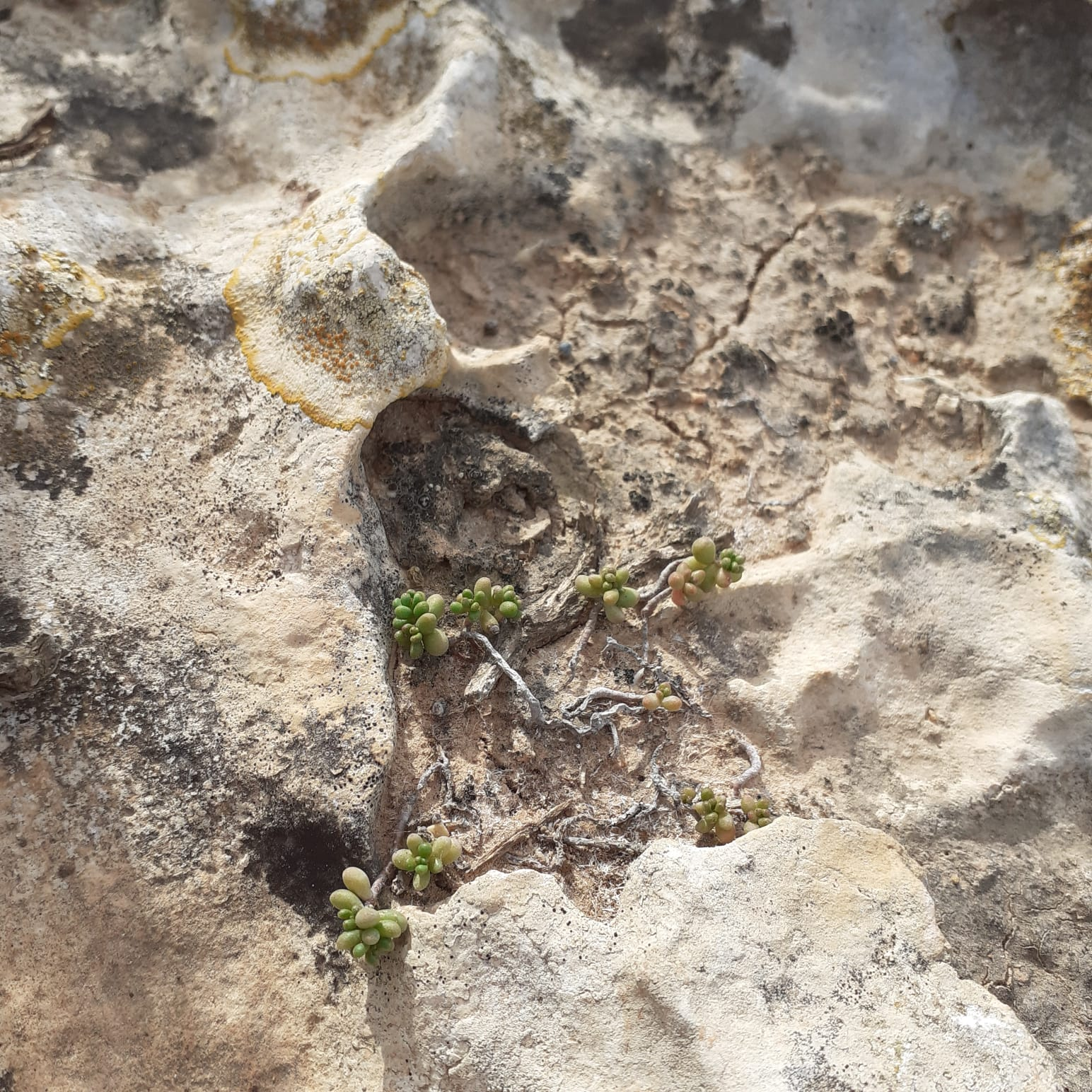

Scientific classification
- Kingdom: Plantae
- Clade: Embryophytes
- Clade: Tracheophytes
- Clade: Spermatophytes
- Clade: Angiosperms
- Clade: Eudicots
- Order: Saxifragales
- Family: Crassulaceae
- Genus: Sedum
- Species: S. album
- Subspecies: S. a. subsp. rupimelitense

Trinomial name
- Sedum album subsp. rupimelitense Mifsud, R.Stephenson & Thiede

= Sedum album subsp. rupimelitense =

Species of flowering plant

Sedum album subsp. rupimelitense is a plant subspecies belonging to the Crassulaceae family. It is an endemic taxon in the Maltese Islands and is found growing on sea cliffs and rock faces. This taxon is often referred to as the Maltese stonecrop due to its growth on rocky outcrops.

== Description ==
Sedum album subsp. rupimelitense is a succulent plant with fleshy leaves that form rosettes. The leaves are green, linear-elliptic to ovoid, and are covered in a waxy coating to prevent water loss. The plant has a slender flexible woody stem that produces small white flowers during May and June. It produces sterile seeds and propagates vegetatively.

== Distribution ==
Sedum album subsp. rupimelitense is found exclusively in the Maltese Islands, where it is endemic. It is found growing on rocky outcrops and sea cliffs on the islands of Malta and Gozo. The plant is not known to grow anywhere else in the world. The population is usually divided into small fragments, with the exception of a 1.5km stretch between Rdum Dikkiena and San Ġorġ tal-Fawwara. The population's strict rock-dwelling habitat is gradually decreasing due to natural causes like erosion, landslides, and cliff collapses.

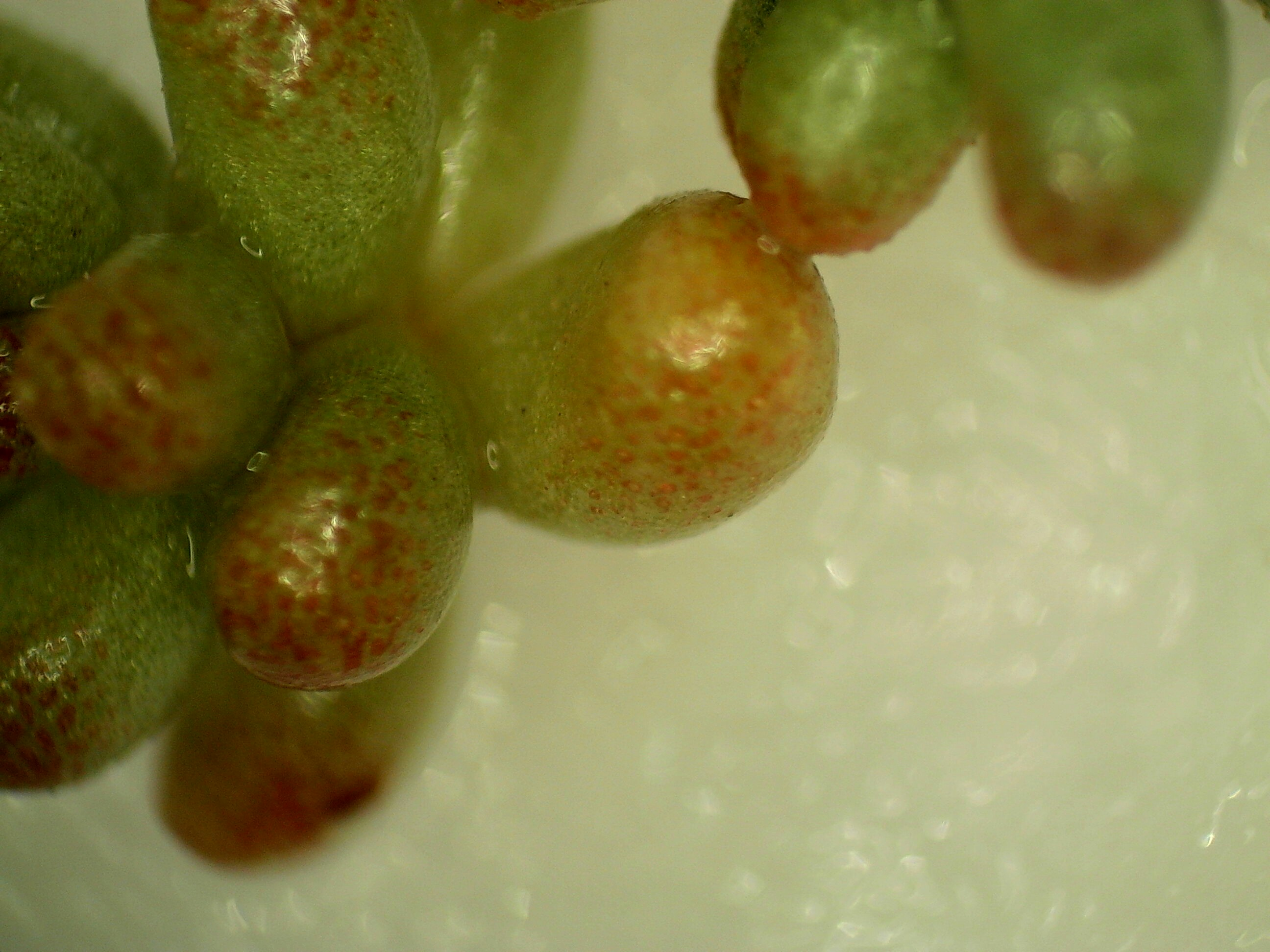
Sedum album subsp. rupimelitense leaves showing papillae

== Habitat ==
The subspecies is a xerophyte, meaning that it is adapted to grow in dry conditions. It is found growing on rocky outcrops and sea cliffs where there is little soil and water, and where other plants struggle to survive. The plant is also able to tolerate high levels of salt, making it well-suited to its coastal habitat.

== Conservation status ==
The subspecies is listed as Endangered on the IUCN Red List. The plant is threatened by a number of factors, including habitat destruction and degradation due to urbanisation and quarrying activities. In addition, the plant is also at risk from the impacts of climate change, such as increased temperatures and reduced rainfall.

== Conservation efforts ==
Efforts to conserve S. album subsp. rupimelitense are ongoing in the Maltese Islands. The plant is protected under Maltese law, which prohibits the uprooting or destruction of wild plants. In addition, the plant is included in a number of conservation initiatives that aim to conserve Malta's biodiversity.
