= 3'-Hydroxyechinenone =

3′-Hydroxyechinenone

Names
- IUPAC name (3′R)-3′-Hydroxy-β,β-caroten-4-one
- Systematic IUPAC name 3-{(1E,3E,5E,7E,9E,11E,13E,15E,17E)-18-[(4R)-4-Hydroxy-2,6,6-trimethylcyclohex-1-en-1-yl]-3,7,12,16-tetramethyloctadeca-1,3,5,7,9,11,13,15,17-nonen-1-yl}-2,4,4-trimethylcyclohex-2-en-1-one
- Other names LMPR01070098; 3'-OH-Echinenone; C15965

Identifiers
3D model (JSmol)	Interactive image
ChEBI	CHEBI:80214
ChemSpider	17220910
KEGG	C15965
PubChem CID	16061233
CompTox Dashboard (EPA)	DTXSID901032358
- InChI: InChI=1S/C40H54O2/c1-29(17-13-19-31(3)21-23-36-33(5)27-35(41)28-40(36,9)10)15-11-12-16-30(2)18-14-20-32(4)22-24-37-34(6)38(42)25-26-39(37,7)8/h11-24,35,41H,25-28H2,1-10H3/b12-11+,17-13+,18-14+,23-21+,24-22+,29-15+,30-16+,31-19+,32-20+/t35-/m1/s1 Key: ZRCXVNZZDQGBQT-BANQPSJHSA-N
- SMILES: CC1=C(C(C[C@@H](C1)O)(C)C)/C=C/C(=C/C=C/C(=C/C=C/C=C(\C)/C=C/C=C(\C)/C=C/C2=C(C(=O)CCC2(C)C)C)/C)/C

Properties
Chemical formula	C_{40}H_{54}O_{2}
Molar mass	566.870 g·mol^{−1}
- Except where otherwise noted, data are given for materials in their standard state (at 25 °C [77 °F], 100 kPa). (what is ?) Infobox references

3′-Hydroxyechinenone is a keto-carotenoid pigment found in cyanobacteria and microalgae. Carotenoids belong to a larger class of phytochemicals known as terpenoids. The chemical formula of canthaxanthin is C_{40}H_{54}O_{2}. It is found non-covalently bound in the orange carotenoid protein (OCP), which is a soluble protein involved in photoprotection and non-photochemical quenching of photosynthesis.
