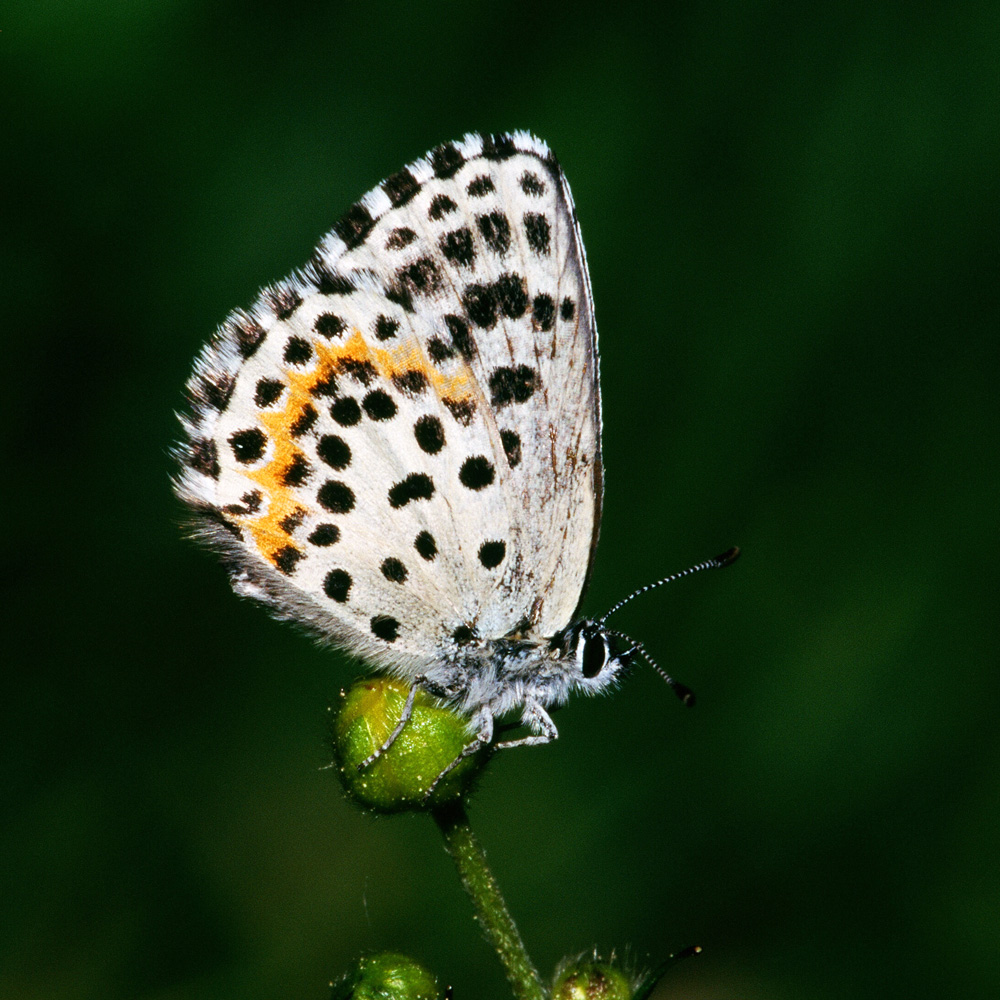
- Scolitantides orion

Scientific classification
- Kingdom: Animalia
- Phylum: Arthropoda
- Class: Insecta
- Order: Lepidoptera
- Family: Lycaenidae
- Subfamily: Polyommatinae
- Tribe: Polyommatini
- Genus: Scolitantides; Hübner, 1819

= Scolitantides =

Monotypic butterfly genus in family Lycaenidae

Scolitantides is a Palearctic genus of butterfly in the family Lycaenidae. The genus is monotypic, containing the single species Scolitantides orion (Pallas, 1771).
