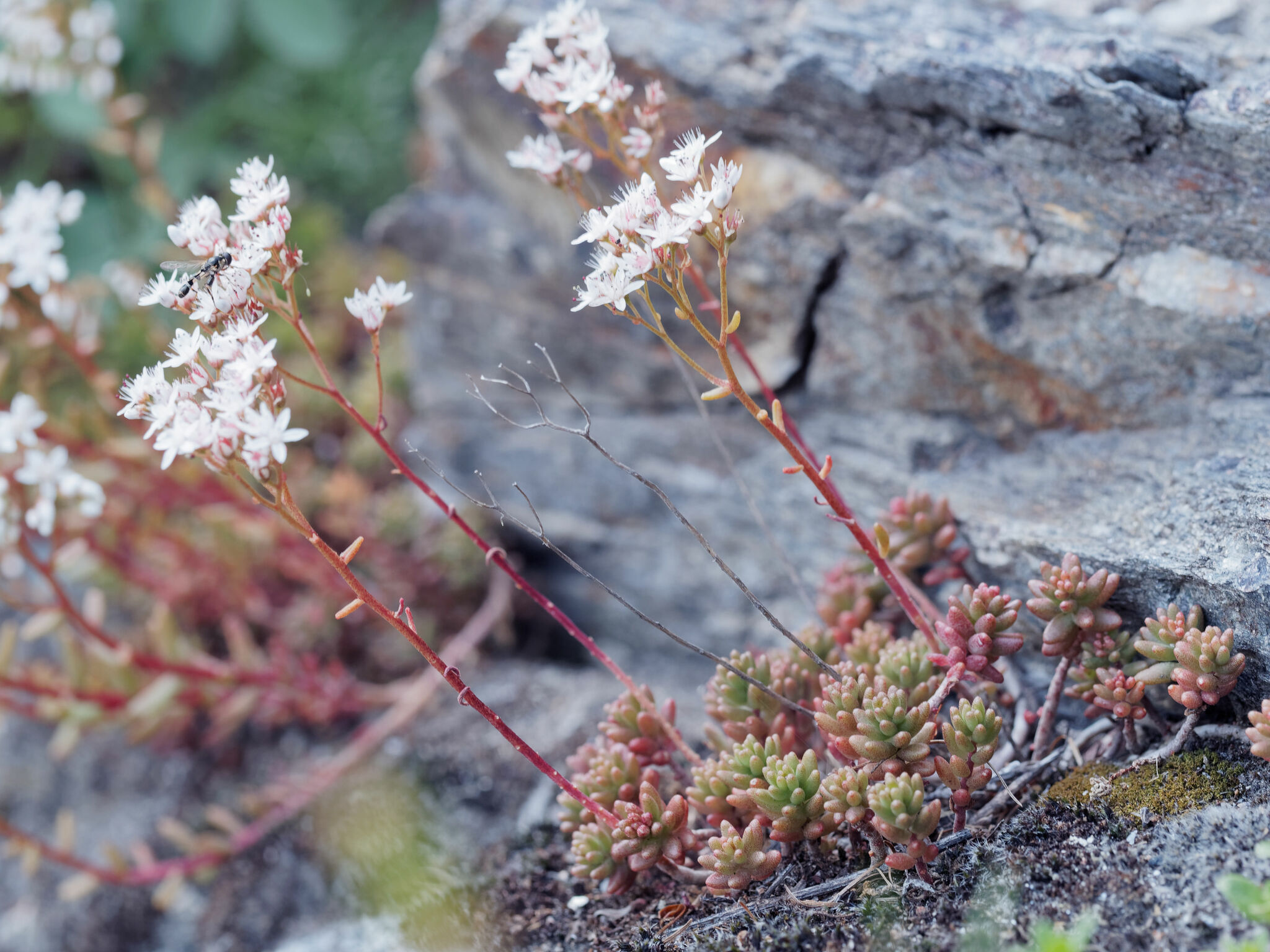
- In Italy

Scientific classification
- Kingdom: Plantae
- Clade: Tracheophytes
- Clade: Angiosperms
- Clade: Eudicots
- Order: Saxifragales
- Family: Crassulaceae
- Genus: Sedum
- Species: S. album

Binomial name
- Sedum album L.

= Sedum album =

Species of flowering plant

Sedum album, the white stonecrop, is a flowering plant of the genus Sedum in the family Crassulaceae. It is found in the northern temperate regions of the world, often growing in crevices or free-draining rocky soil. As a long-day plant it grows vegetatively for most of the year and flowers in summer.

== Taxonomy ==
Three subspecies album, micranthum (Bastard ex DC.) Syme and teretifolium Syme have been described. In 2015, a new subspecies rupimelitense was described in Malta.

== Description ==
White stonecrop is a tufted perennial herb that forms mat-like stands. Much of the year the stems are short, semi prostrate and densely clad in leaves. At the flowering time in July and August, the stems lengthen and are erect, occasionally branched and often pinkish-brown. The leaves are alternate, fleshy and nearly cylindrical with a blunt, rounded tip. They are also sometimes tinged with pink, especially in drought-stressed plants. The starry flowers form a dense cyme. The calyx has five fleshy sepals fused at the base, the corolla consists of five regular white petals, there are ten stamens, a separate gynoecium and five pistils. The fruit is five united, many-seeded follicles.

== Habitat ==
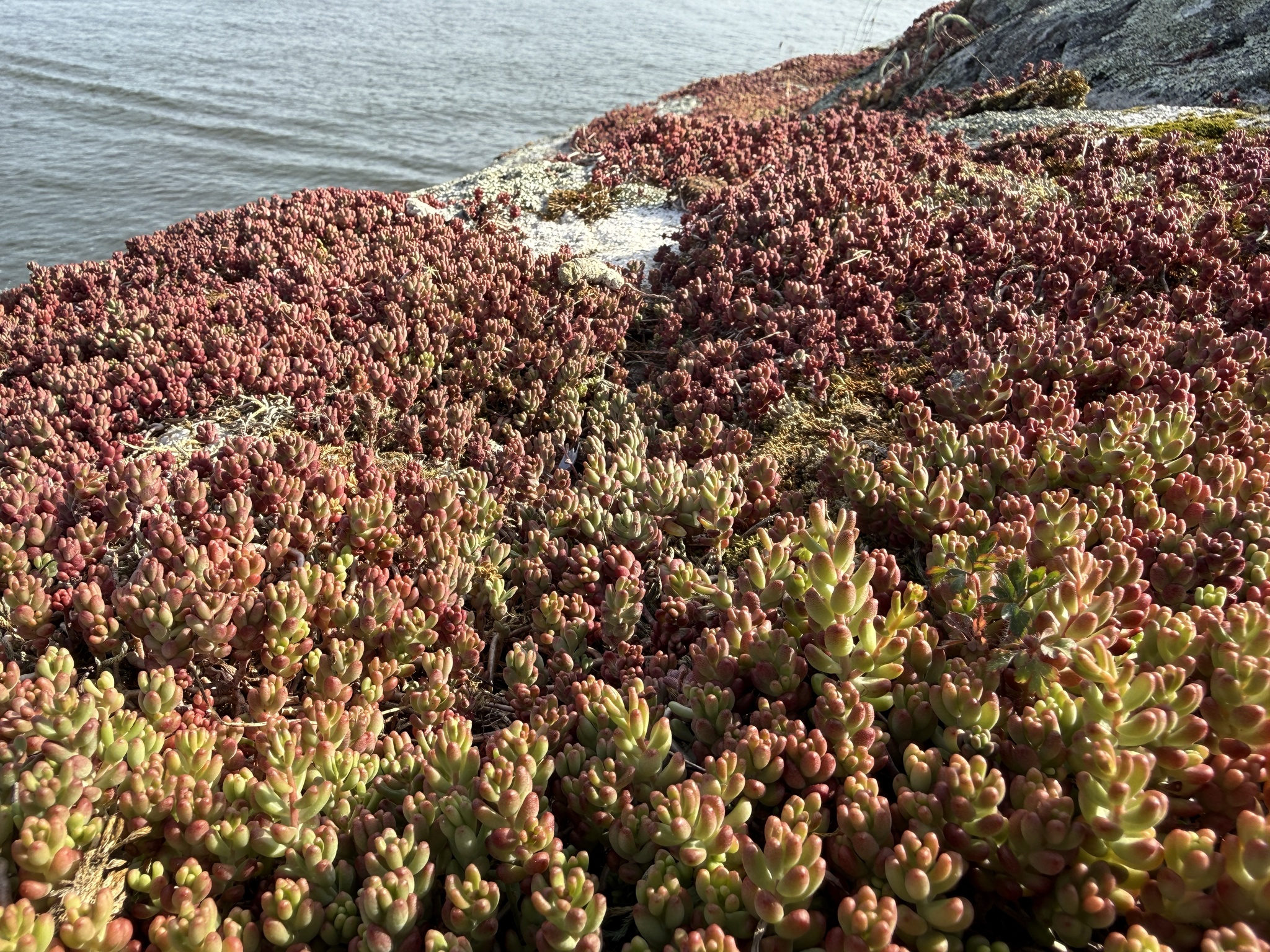
As an introduced species, in British Columbia (Canada)

White stonecrop is a low-growing plant that cannot compete with more vigorous fast-growing species. It is specially adapted for growing on thin dry soils and can be found on walls, dry banks, seashore rocks and in rocky meadows.

== Physiology ==
Sedum album is able to acclimate to its environment. It can switch between C3 carbon fixation and crassulacean acid metabolism (CAM) depending on the availability of water. CAM saves water as the stomata on its leaves only open to allow CO_{2} to diffuse into the leaves at night when the temperature (and therefore evapotranspiration) is lower. Drought stressed plants are also more susceptible to photoinhibition which CAM may help to protect against.

== Cultivation ==
Hardy in Zones 3–9.

== Gallery ==
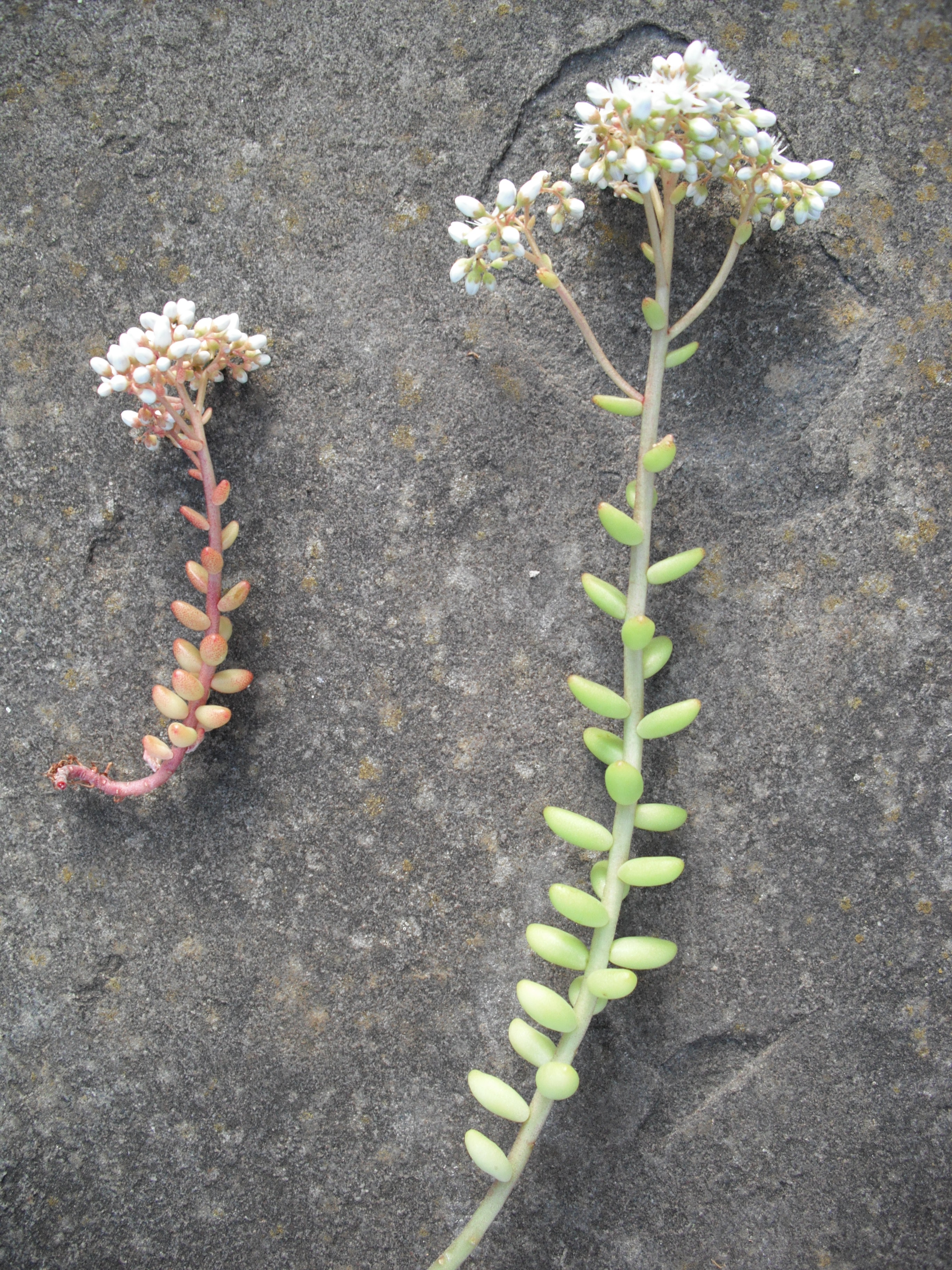
The plant on the left is relatively drought stressed and the one on the right is well watered

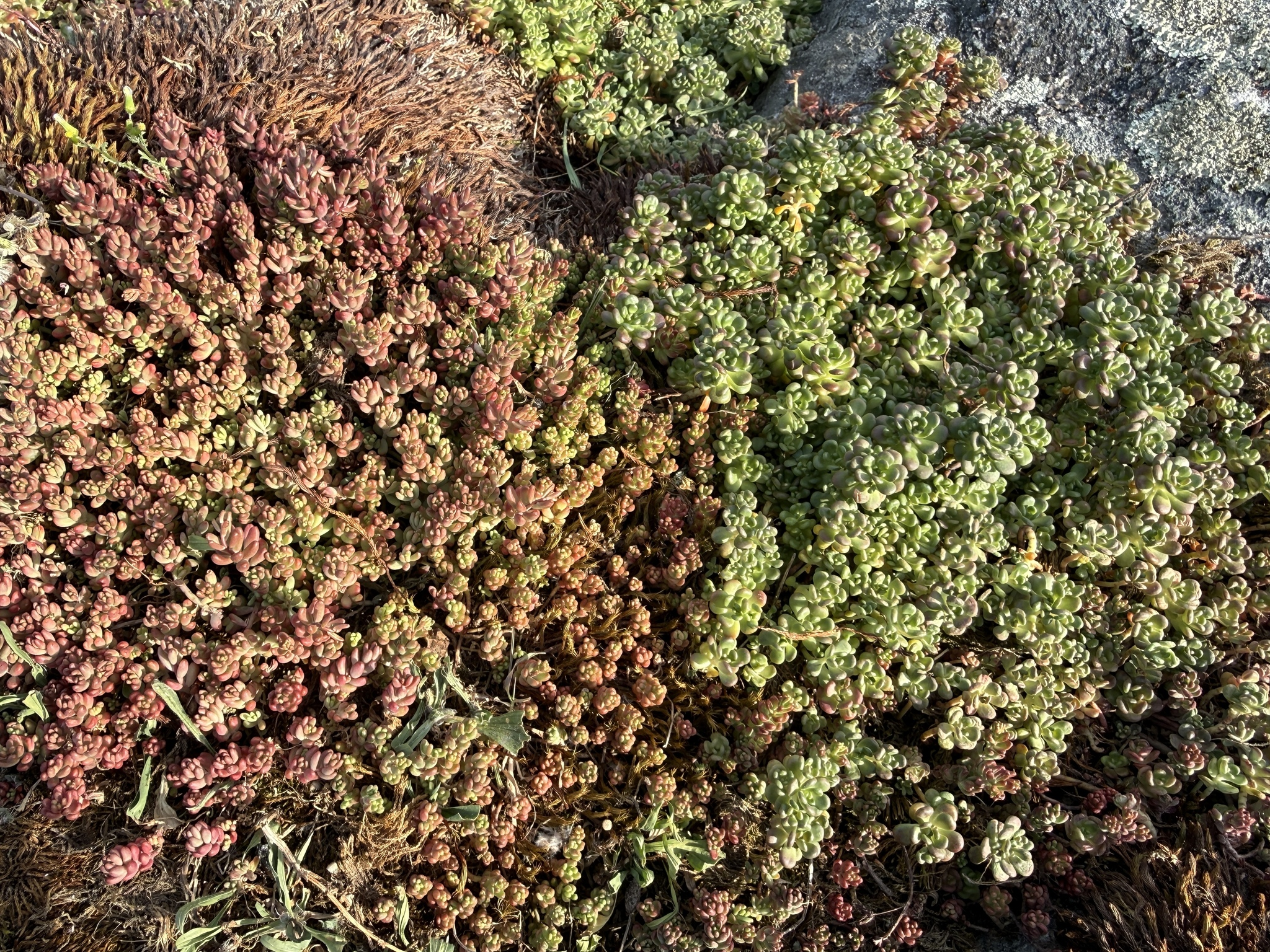
S. album (left) introduced in British Columbia, compared to the native S. oreganum (right)
