= FRP =

FRP may refer to:

== Organizations ==
- FairPoint Communications (NASDAQ), a US company
- Free Russian Press (1853–1867), in UK
- Family resource program, Canada
- FRP Advisory, UK company

=== Politics ===
- Progress Party (Denmark) (Danish: Fremskridtspartiet)
- Progress Party (Norway) (Norwegian: Fremskrittspartiet)
- Federal Republic of the Philippines

== Science and technology ==
- Fibre-reinforced plastic
- Fluorescence recovery protein, in cyanobacteria
- Free radical polymerization
- Functional reactive programming, in computing
- Factory reset protection, on some Android phones

== Other uses ==
- Fantasy role-playing
- Franco-Provençal language, ISO 639-3 code
