= Indirect DNA damage =

Theory of damage from ultraviolet light

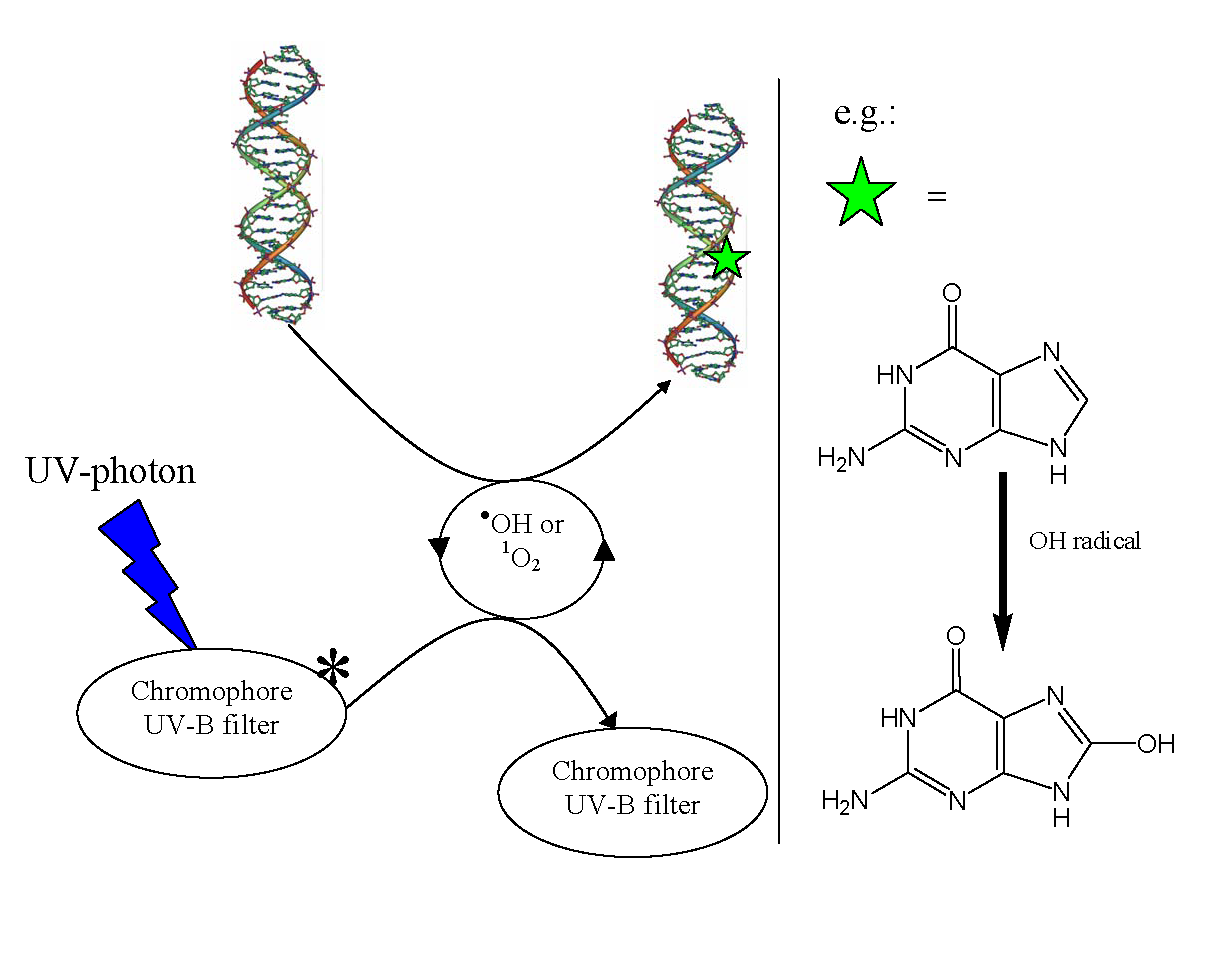
Indirect DNA damage: The chromophore absorbs UV-light (* denotes an excited state), and the energy of the excited state is creating singlet oxygen (^{1}O_{2}) or a hydroxyl radical (•OH), which then damages DNA through oxidation.

Indirect DNA damage occurs when a UV-photon is absorbed in the human skin by a chromophore that does not have the ability to convert the energy into harmless heat very quickly. Molecules that do not have this ability have a long-lived excited state. This long lifetime leads to a high probability for reactions with other molecules—so-called bimolecular reactions. Melanin and DNA have extremely short excited state lifetimes in the range of a few femtoseconds (10^{−15}s). The excited state lifetime of compounds used in sunscreens such as menthyl anthranilate, avobenzone or padimate O is 1,000 to 1,000,000 times longer than that of melanin, and therefore they may cause damage to living cells that come in contact with them.

The molecule that originally absorbs the UV-photon is called a "chromophore". Bimolecular reactions can occur either between the excited chromophore and DNA or between the excited chromophore and another species, to produce free radicals and reactive oxygen species. These reactive chemical species can reach DNA by diffusion and the bimolecular reaction damages the DNA (oxidative stress). Unlike direct DNA damage which causes sunburn, indirect DNA damage does not result in any warning signal or pain in the human body.

The bimolecular reactions that cause the indirect DNA damage are illustrated in the figure:

$$\mathrm{(Chromophore)^* + {}^3O_2 \ \xrightarrow{} \ Chromophore + {}^1O_2}$$

^{1}O_{2} is reactive harmful singlet oxygen:

$\mathrm{{}^1O_2 + intact\ DNA \ \xrightarrow{} \ {}^3O_2 + damaged\ DNA}$

== Location of the damage ==
Unlike direct DNA damage, which occurs in areas directly exposed to UV-B light, reactive chemical species can travel through the body and affect other areas—possibly even inner organs. The traveling nature of the indirect DNA damage can be seen in the fact that melanoma can occur in places that are not directly illuminated by the sun—in contrast to basal-cell carcinoma and squamous cell carcinoma, which appear only on directly illuminated locations on the body.

== See also ==
- Free radical damage to DNA
- Photoprotection
- Sunscreen
