= Iron-starvation-induced protein A =

Iron-starvation-induced chlorophyll-a/b-binding protein

Identifiers
- Symbol: IsiA, CP43'
- Pfam: PF00421
- InterPro: IPR000932
Available protein structures:
- PDB: IPR000932 PF00421 (ECOD; PDBsum)
- AlphaFold: IPR000932; PF00421

Iron-starvation-induced protein A, also known as isiA, is a photosynthesis-related chlorophyll-containing protein found in cyanobacteria. It belongs to the chlorophyll-a/b-binding family of proteins, and has been shown to have a photoprotection role in preventing oxidative damage via energy dissipation. It was originally identified under Fe starvation, and thus received the name iron-starvation-induced protein A. However, the protein has more recently been found to respond to a variety of stress conditions such as high irradiance. It can aggregate with carotenoids and form rings around the PSI reaction center complexes to aid in photoprotective energy dissipation.

== Antenna function ==
IsiA functions as an antenna for photosystem I (PSI) under iron-limiting conditions, when phycobilisomes disappear. In the (PSI)3(Isi3)18 complex most of the harvested energy is probably used by PSI; in other PSI-containing supercomplexes a large part of the energy will probably not be used for light harvesting, but rather is dissipated to protect the organism from light damage. Under iron-starvation, it forms a complex with PSI trimers, where the trimer is surrounded by a ring composed of 18 isiA subunits. When the PSI subunits PsaF and PsaJ are missing the ring is composed of 17 isiA subunits, indicating that each isiA subunit has a different interaction with the trimer. This suggests that the size of the PSI complex determines the number of isiA units in the surrounding ring. In the absence of PsaL, it has a tendency to form incomplete rings with PSI monomers, suggesting PsaL helps form the rings. Also it can form other aggregates of varying sizes depending on the level of iron deprivation.

== Photoprotective function ==
IsiA aggregates forming empty multimeric rings (without PSI) also accumulate and are very abundant in long-term iron-depleted cells. When isolated, these aggregates are in a strongly quenched state, suggesting they are responsible for thermal dissipation of absorbed energy. IsiA is also synthesized in cells grown under high light irradiances, protecting from photodamage

== See also ==
- Photosystem II light-harvesting protein
