= Fluorescence recovery protein =

Identifiers
- Organism: Synechocystis sp. PCC 6803
- Symbol: FRP
- Alt. symbols: slr1964
- PDB: 4JDX
- UniProt: P74103
Search for
- Structures: Swiss-model
- Domains: InterPro

Fluorescence recovery protein (FRP) is a small protein involved in regulating non-photochemical quenching in cyanobacteria. It prevents accumulation of the red photoactivated form of orange carotenoid protein (OCP), thereby reducing the amount of fluorescence quenching that occurs between the OCP and the phycobilisome antenna complexes. It interacts with the C-terminal domain of OCP, which shares homology with the NTF2 superfamily.

== Function ==
FRP is constitutively active, both in vivo and in vitro. It is able to prevent quenching of phycobilin fluorescence by OCP in vitro. Overexpression of FRP in Synechocystis PCC 6803 leads to an absence of fluorescence quenching. Deletion mutants of FRP show a slightly larger degree of fluorescence quenching induced by strong blue-green light, but was unable to restore fluorescence levels when transferred to low-light or darkness.

== Structure ==
The protein is all alpha-helical, and the protein structure from Synechocystis was solved in 2013, showing both a dimer as well as a tetramer form in the same crystal used for X-ray diffraction. It is believed that the dimer is the active form. In the tetramer structure, one of the alpha helices is extended, disrupting the structure of a conserved patch of amino acids that is suggested to be an active site. Among these conserved residues, a histidine at position 53 and an arginine residue at position 60 have been shown to be essential for activity. Mutations in several other residues within this patch led to poor expression and precipitation, as well as loss of activity.

== Genomics ==
The gene for FRP is commonly found immediately downstream of OCP, although a CrtW-like B-carotene ketolase gene is occasionally found between the OCP and FRP. The FRP gene is transcribed independently from OCP in Synechocystis 6803 and thus the OCP/FRP locus is not considered an operon.

== Hypotheses ==
- Tetramerization may inactivate some of the FRP, and could thereby serve as a regulatory switch to permit NPQ to occur. This could occur by structural changes caused by differences in cellular pH or redox that commonly occur under high-light stress.
- FRP may trigger inactivation of OCP by gathering the two domains of OCP back together, although no interaction with the N-terminal domain of OCP has been detected.
- FRP may drive the conversion of OCP back to its inactive orange form by affecting the carotenoid.
