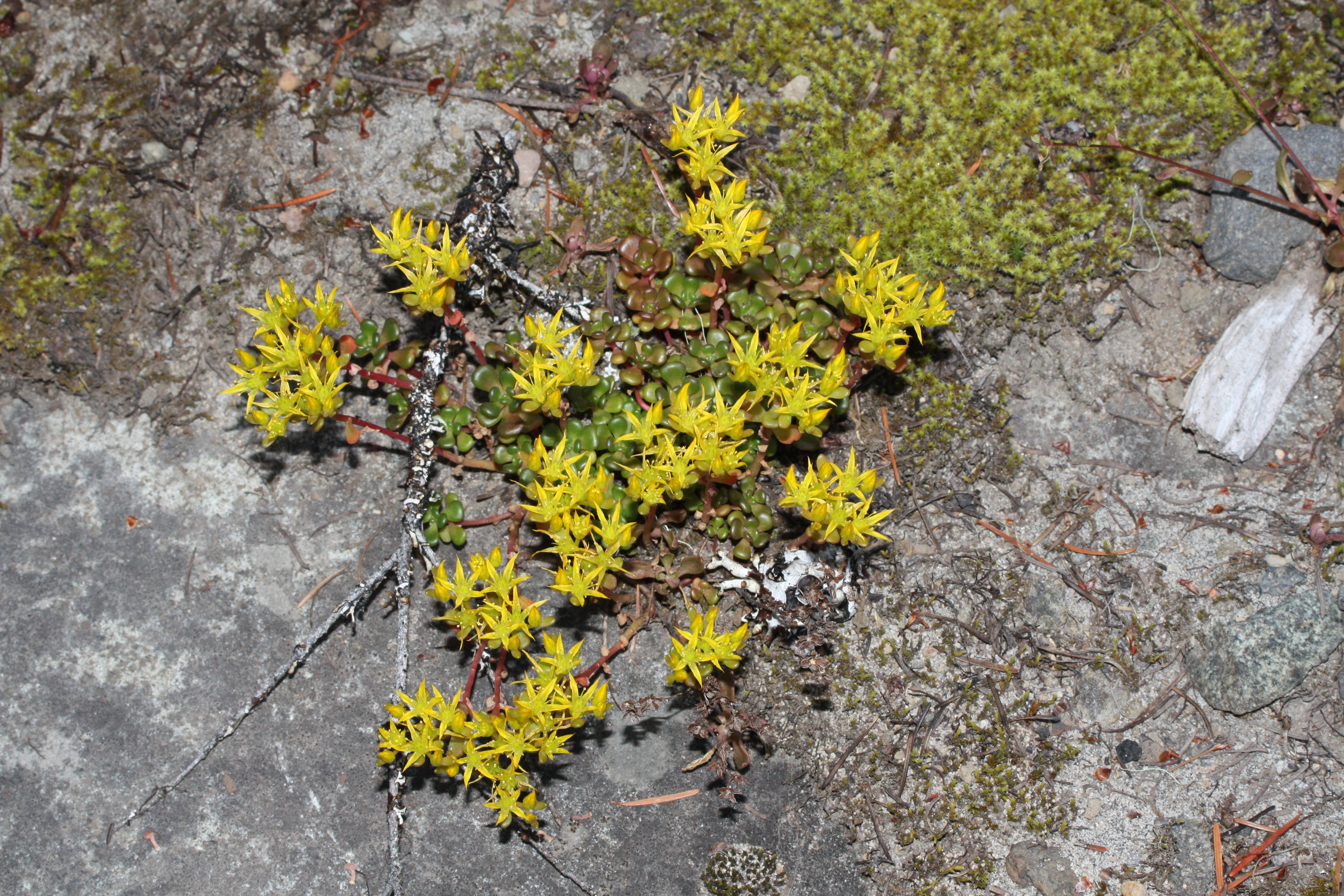
- Sedum oreganum in Mount Rainier National Park

Scientific classification
- Kingdom: Plantae
- Clade: Tracheophytes
- Clade: Angiosperms
- Clade: Eudicots
- Order: Saxifragales
- Family: Crassulaceae
- Genus: Sedum
- Species: S. oreganum

Binomial name
- Sedum oreganum Nutt.

= Sedum oreganum =

Species of succulent

Sedum oreganum is a species of succulent plant of the genus Sedum. It grows along the Pacific Coast of North America from Alaska to far northern California. The plant, known by the common name Oregon stonecrop, grows in many types of rocky habitat, including coastal bluffs and cliffs and the talus of higher inland mountains.

== Gallery ==
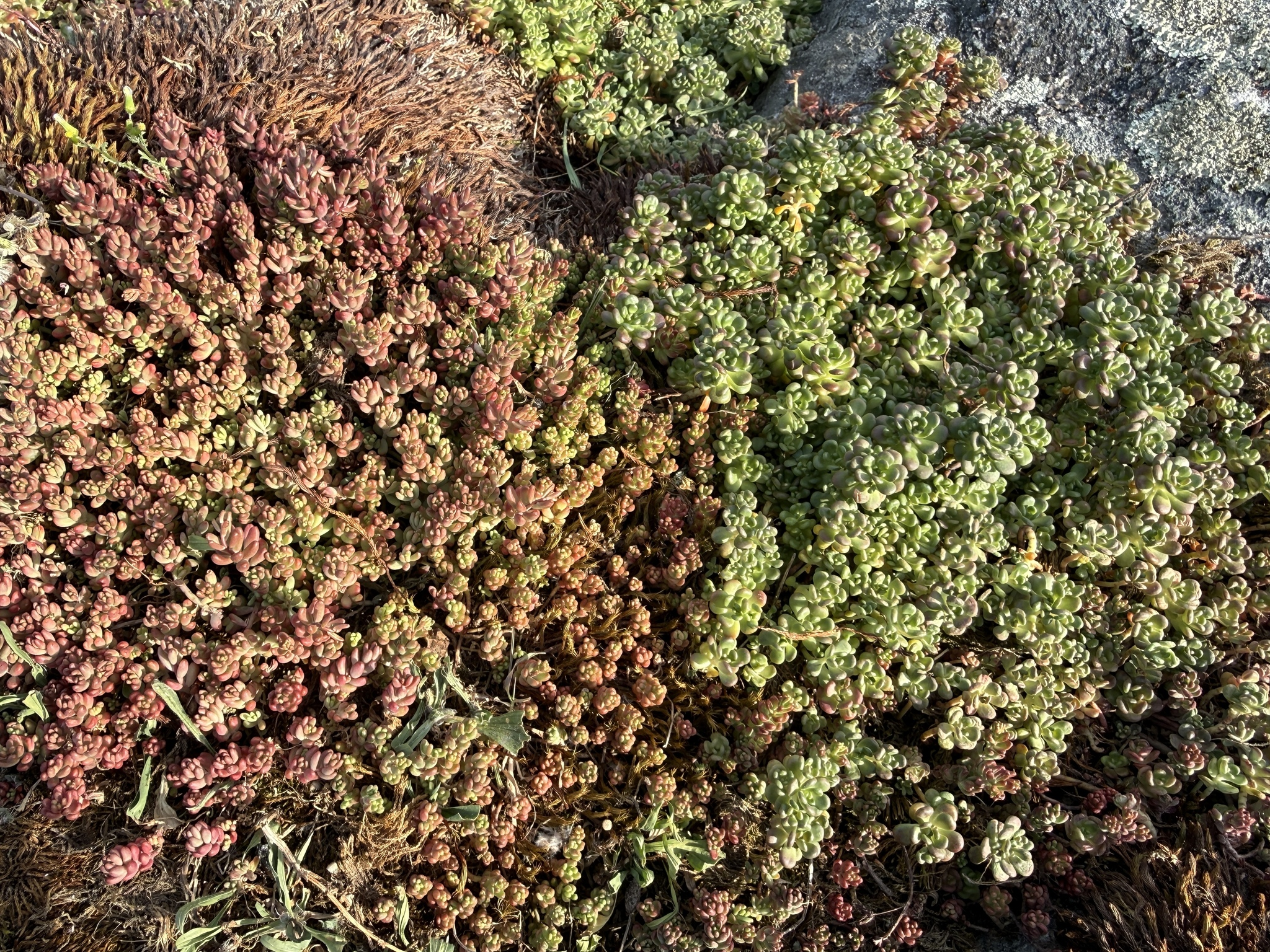
The introduced species S. album (left) compared to the native S. oreganum (right), in British Columbia, Canada

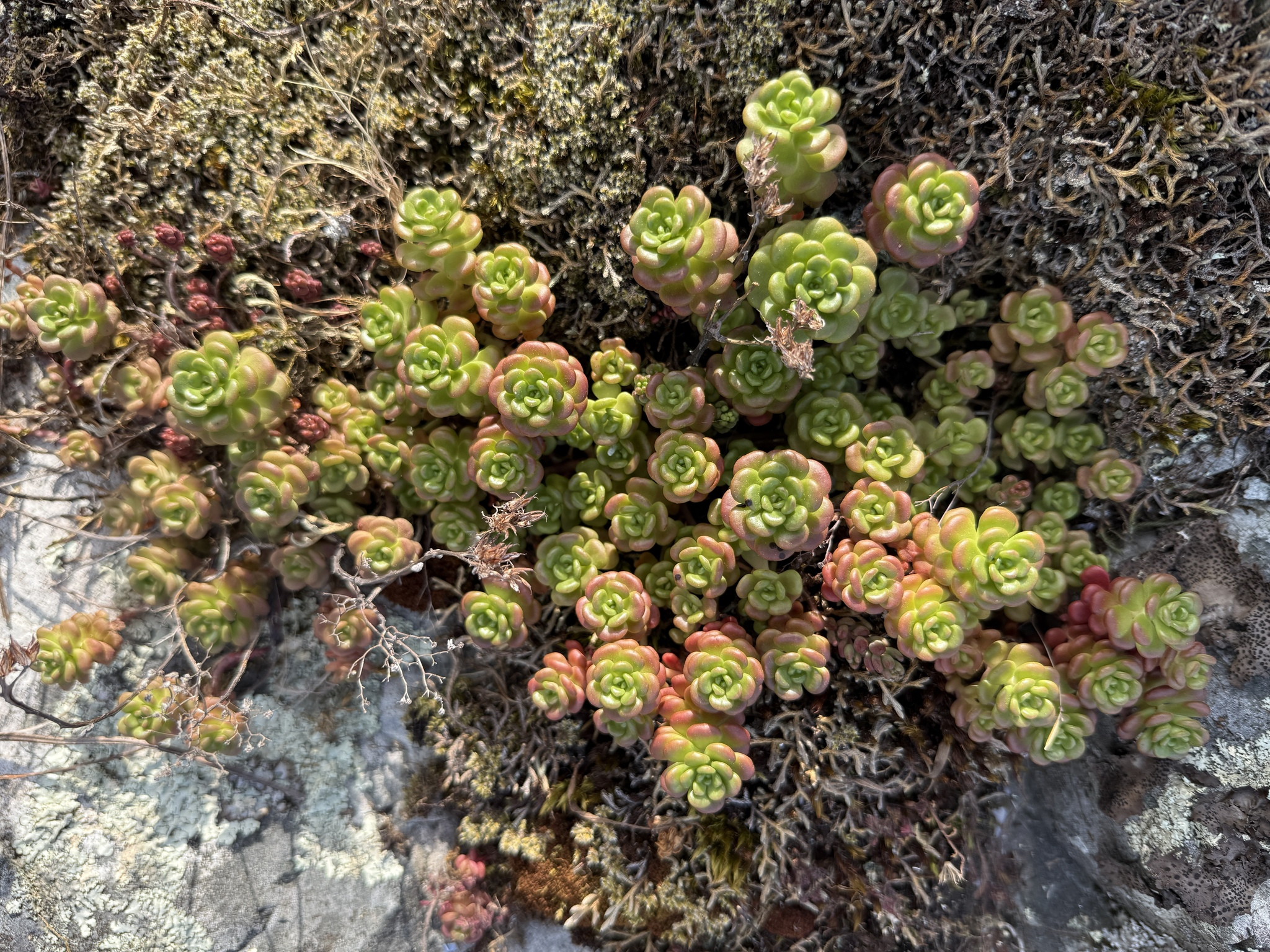
In British Columbia, Canada
