= Willy Krogmann =

German philologist (1905–1967)

- Born: 13 September 1905; Wismar, Germany
- Died: 20 March 1967 (aged 61); Hamburg, Germany

Academic background
- Education: University of Rostock

Academic work
- Discipline: Germanic philology
- Institutions: University of Hamburg
- Main interests: Frisian languages; Germanic Antiquity; Runology

Willy Krogmann (13 September 1905 – 20 March 1967) was a German philologist who specialized in Germanic studies.

== Biography ==
Willy Krogmann was born in Wismar, Germany on 13 September 1905. He was the son of a timber merchant. Since 1924, Krogmann studied German, philosophy and history at the universities of Leipzig and Rostock. He received his Ph.D. at Rostock in 1928.

From 1933 to 1936, Krogmann worked on the production of the Deutsches Wörterbuch. He habilitated at the University of Königsberg in 1939, and subsequently taught Frisian at the University of Hamburg. He served as a sonderführer in the Wehrmacht in the Netherlands during World War II. After the war, Krogmann took over the leadership of the Frisian Institute in Hamburg, and worked on the production of a dictionary of Heligoland Frisian. From 1952 to 1967, Krogmann lectured in Frisian philology at the University of Hamburg. He was also a specialist in Germanic linguistics in general, and on runology and Germanic Antiquity. Krogmann died in Hamburg on 20 March 1967.

== Selected works ==
- Untersuchungen zum Ursprung der Gretchentragödie. Wismar 1928 (Dissertation)
- Der Name der Germanen. Wismar 1933
- Goethes 'Urfaust'. Berlin: 1933 (= Germanische Studien, Band 143)
- Der Rattenfänger von Hameln. Berlin 1934
- Die Heimatfrage des Heliand im Lichte des Wortschatzes. Wismar 1937
- als Herausgeber: Der Todtentanz in der Marienkirche zu Berlin. Berlin 1937.
- Breiz da Vreiziz! ("Die Bretagne den Bretonen!"). Zeugnisse zum Freiheitskampf der Bretonen. Halle 1940 (= Schriftenreihe der Deutschen Gesellschaft für Keltische Studien, Band 6)
- als Herausgeber: Hermann Boßdorf. Gesammelte Werke. 11 Bände, Hamburg 1952–1957
- Helgoländer Wörterbuch. Mainz 1957–1969 (5 Lieferungen, mehr nicht erschienen)
- Das Lachsargument. In: Zeitschrift für vergleichende Sprachforschung 76, 1960, S. 161–178
- (mit Ulrich Pretzel:) Bibliographie zum Nibelungenlied und zur Klage. 4. Aufl. Berlin 1966

== Sources ==
- Wolfgang Bachofer, Walter Röll: Bibliographie Willy Krogmann. Wiesbaden 1972
- Christoph König (Hrsg.), unter Mitarbeit von Birgit Wägenbaur u. a.: Internationales Germanistenlexikon 1800–1950. Band 2: H–Q. de Gruyter, Berlin/New York 2003, ISBN 3-11-015485-4, S. 1023–1025.
- Ulrich Pretzel (1982). "Krogmann, Willy". Neue Deutsche Biographie (in German). Vol. 13. Berlin: Duncker & Humblot. pp. 67–68. (full text online).
