= David Krogmann =

American biologist (1934–2016)

David W. Krogmann
- Born: 1934
- Died: January 22, 2016 (aged 81–82); West Lafayette, Indiana
- Scientific career
- Fields: Biochemistry
- Workplaces: Purdue University

David W. Krogmann (1934 – January 22, 2016) was an American biologist and a professor of biochemistry at Purdue University. He is known for his work in photosynthesis in chloroplasts and cyanobacteria.

He discovered the Orange Carotenoid Protein of cyanobacteria in 1981 and helped solve its crystal structure.
