= Internal conversion (chemistry) =

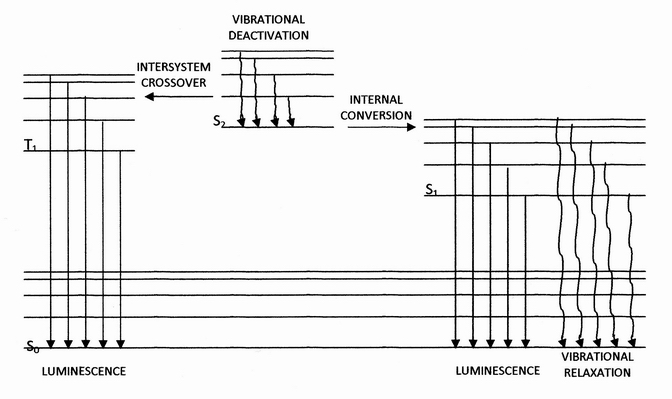
Jablonski diagram indicating intersystem crossing (left) and internal conversion (right).

Internal conversion is a transition from a higher to a lower electronic state in a molecule or atom. It is sometimes called "radiationless de-excitation", because no photons are emitted. It differs from intersystem crossing in that, while both are radiationless methods of de-excitation, the molecular spin state for internal conversion remains the same, whereas it changes for intersystem crossing. The energy of the electronically excited state is given off to vibrational modes of the molecule. The excitation energy is transformed into heat.

== Examples ==
Several natural molecules perform a fast internal conversion. This ability to transform the excitation energy of photon into heat can be a crucial property for photoprotection by molecules such as melanin. Fast internal conversion reduces the excited state lifetime, and thereby prevents bimolecular reactions. Bimolecular electron transfer always produces a reactive chemical species, free radicals. Nucleic acids (precisely the single, free nucleotides, not those bound in a DNA/RNA strand) have an extremely short lifetime due to a fast internal conversion.

Both melanin and DNA have some of the fastest internal conversion rates.

In applications that make use of bimolecular electron transfer the internal conversion is undesirable. For example, it is advantageous to have a long-lived excited state in Grätzel cells (Dye-sensitized solar cells).

== See also ==
- Fluorescence spectroscopy
- Förster resonance energy transfer
