= Photosynthetic state transition =

In photosynthesis, state transitions are rearrangements of the photosynthetic apparatus which occur on short time-scales (seconds to minutes). The effect is prominent in cyanobacteria, whereby the phycobilisome light-harvesting antenna complexes alter their preference for transfer of excitation energy between the two reaction centers, PS I and PS II. This shift helps to minimize photodamage caused by reactive oxygen species (ROS) under stressful conditions such as high light, but may also be used to offset imbalances between the rates of generating reductant and ATP.

The phenomenon was first discovered in unicellular green algae, and may also occur in plants. However, in these organisms it occurs by a different mechanism, which is not as well understood. The plant/algal mechanism is considered functionally analogous to the cyanobacterial mechanism but involves completely different components. The foremost difference is the presence of fundamentally different types of light-harvesting antenna complexes: plants and green algae use an intrinsically-bound membrane complex of chlorophyll a/b binding proteins for their antenna, instead of the soluble phycobilisome complexes used by cyanobacteria (and certain algae).
