= Echinenone =

Names
- IUPAC name β,β-Caroten-4-one
- Systematic IUPAC name 2,4,4-Trimethyl-3-[(1E,3E,5E,7E,9E,11E,13E,15E,17E)-3,7,12,16-tetramethyl-18-(2,6,6-trimethylcyclohex-1-en-1-yl)octadeca-1,3,5,7,9,11,13,15,17-nonaen-1-yl]cyclohex-2-en-1-one
- Other names Myxoxanthine

Identifiers
CAS Number	432-68-8
3D model (JSmol)	Interactive image
ChemSpider	4444648
ECHA InfoCard	100.006.441
PubChem CID	5281236
UNII	LJ5IO02MNQ
CompTox Dashboard (EPA)	DTXSID101026555
- InChI: InChI=1S/C40H54O/c1-30(18-13-20-32(3)23-25-36-34(5)22-15-28-39(36,7)8)16-11-12-17-31(2)19-14-21-33(4)24-26-37-35(6)38(41)27-29-40(37,9)10/h11-14,16-21,23-26H,15,22,27-29H2,1-10H3/b12-11+,18-13+,19-14+,25-23+,26-24+,30-16+,31-17+,32-20+,33-21+ Key: SJWWTRQNNRNTPU-XJUZQKKNSA-N; Key: QXNWZXMBUKUYMD-QQGJMDNJSA-N
- SMILES: CC1=C(C(CCC1)(C)C)/C=C/C(=C/C=C/C(=C/C=C/C=C(\C)/C=C/C=C(\C)/C=C/C2=C(C(=O)CCC2(C)C)C)/C)/C

Properties
Chemical formula	C_{40}H_{54}O
Molar mass	550.871 g·mol^{−1}
- Except where otherwise noted, data are given for materials in their standard state (at 25 °C [77 °F], 100 kPa). (what is ?) Infobox references

Echinenone is a xanthophyll, with formula C_{40}H_{54}O. It is found in some cyanobacteria. It is synthesized from β-carotene by the enzyme beta-carotene ketolase (or CrtW). It has also been isolated from sea urchins.
