= Photoinhibition =

Photoinhibition of Photosystem II (PSII) leads to loss of PSII electron transfer activity. PSII is continuously repaired via degradation and synthesis of the D1 protein. Lincomycin can be used to block protein synthesis

Photoinhibition is light-induced reduction in the photosynthetic capacity of a plant, alga, or cyanobacterium. Photosystem II (PSII) is more sensitive to light than the rest of the photosynthetic machinery, and most researchers define the term as light-induced damage to PSII. In living organisms, photoinhibited PSII centres are continuously repaired via degradation and synthesis of the D1 protein of the photosynthetic reaction center of PSII. Photoinhibition is also used in a wider sense, as dynamic photoinhibition, to describe all reactions that decrease the efficiency of photosynthesis when plants are exposed to light.

== History ==
The first measurements of photoinhibition were published in 1956 by Bessel Kok. Even in the very first studies, it was obvious that plants have a repair mechanism that continuously repairs photoinhibitory damage. In 1966, Jones and Kok measured the action spectrum of photoinhibition and found that ultraviolet light is highly photoinhibitory. The visible-light part of the action spectrum was found to have a peak in the red-light region, suggesting that chlorophylls act as photoreceptors of photoinhibition. In the 1980s, photoinhibition became a popular topic in photosynthesis research, and the concept of a damaging reaction counteracted by a repair process was re-invented. Research was stimulated by a paper by Kyle, Ohad and Arntzen in 1984, showing that photoinhibition is accompanied by selective loss of a 32-kDa protein, later identified as the PSII reaction center protein D1. The photosensitivity of PSII from which the oxygen evolving complex had been inactivated with chemical treatment was studied in the 1980s and early 1990s. A paper by Imre Vass and colleagues in 1992 described the acceptor-side mechanism of photoinhibition. Measurements of production of singlet oxygen by photoinhibited PSII provided further evidence for an acceptor-side-type mechanism. The concept of a repair cycle that continuously repairs photoinhibitory damage, evolved and was reviewed by Aro et al. in 1993. Many details of the repair cycle, including the finding that the FtsH protease plays an important role in the degradation of the D1 protein, have been discovered since. In 1996, a paper by Tyystjärvi and Aro showed that the rate constant of photoinhibition is directly proportional to light intensity, a result that opposed the former assumption that photoinhibition is caused by the fraction of light energy that exceeds the maximum capability of photosynthesis. The following year, laser pulse photoinhibition experiments done by Itzhak Ohad's group led to the suggestion that charge recombination reactions may be damaging because they can lead to production of singlet oxygen. The molecular mechanism(s) of photoinhibition are constantly under discussion. The newest candidate is the manganese mechanism suggested 2005 by the group of Esa Tyystjärvi. A similar mechanism was suggested by the group of Norio Murata, also in 2005.

== What is inhibited ==
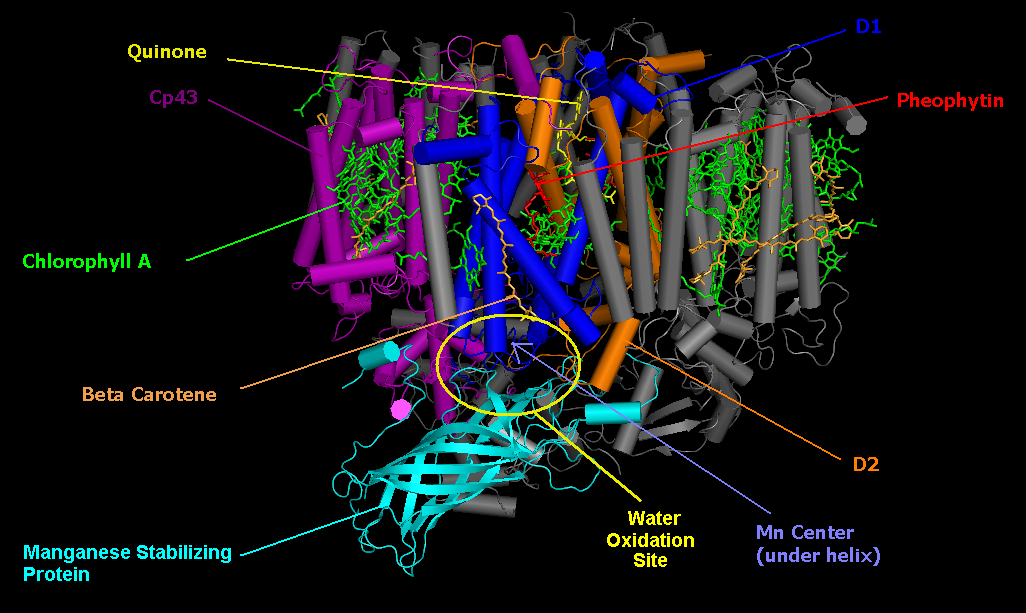
Cyanobacteria photosystem II, dimer, PDB 2AXT

Photoinhibition occurs in all organisms capable of oxygenic photosynthesis, from vascular plants to cyanobacteria. In both plants and cyanobacteria, blue light causes photoinhibition more efficiently than other wavelengths of visible light, and all wavelengths of ultraviolet light are more efficient than wavelengths of visible light. Photoinhibition is a series of reactions that inhibit different activities of PSII, but there is no consensus on what these steps are. The activity of the oxygen-evolving complex of PSII is often found to be lost before the rest of the reaction centre loses activity. However, inhibition of PSII membranes under anaerobic conditions leads primarily to inhibition of electron transfer on the acceptor side of PSII. Ultraviolet light causes inhibition of the oxygen-evolving complex before the rest of PSII becomes inhibited. Photosystem I (PSI) is less susceptible to light-induced damage than PSII, but slow inhibition of this photosystem has been observed. Photoinhibition of PSI occurs in chilling-sensitive plants and the reaction depends on electron flow from PSII to PSI.

=== How often does damage occur? ===
Photosystem II is damaged by light irrespective of light intensity. The quantum yield of the damaging reaction in typical leaves of higher plants exposed to visible light, as well as in isolated thylakoid membrane preparations, is in the range of 10^{−8} to 10^{−7} and independent of the intensity of light. This means that one PSII complex is damaged for every 10-100 million photons that are intercepted. Therefore, photoinhibition occurs at all light intensities and the rate constant of photoinhibition is directly proportional to light intensity. Some measurements suggest that dim light causes damage more efficiently than strong light.

== Molecular mechanism(s) ==
The mechanism(s) of photoinhibition are under debate, several mechanisms have been suggested. Reactive oxygen species, especially singlet oxygen, have a role in the acceptor-side, singlet oxygen and low-light mechanisms. In the manganese mechanism and the donor side mechanism, reactive oxygen species do not play a direct role. Photoinhibited PSII produces singlet oxygen, and reactive oxygen species inhibit the repair cycle of PSII by inhibiting protein synthesis in the chloroplast.

=== Acceptor-side photoinhibition ===
Strong light causes the reduction of the plastoquinone pool, which leads to protonation and double reduction (and double protonation) of the Q_{A} electron acceptor of Photosystem II. The protonated and double-reduced forms of Q_{A} do not function in electron transport. Furthermore, charge recombination reactions in inhibited Photosystem II are expected to lead to the triplet state of the primary donor (P_{680}) more probably than same reactions in active PSII. Triplet P_{680} may react with oxygen to produce harmful singlet oxygen.

=== Donor-side photoinhibition ===
If the oxygen-evolving complex is chemically inactivated, then the remaining electron transfer activity of PSII becomes very sensitive to light. It has been suggested that even in a healthy leaf, the oxygen-evolving complex does not always function in all PSII centers, and those ones are prone to rapid irreversible photoinhibition.

=== Manganese mechanism ===
A photon absorbed by the manganese ions of the oxygen-evolving complex triggers inactivation of the oxygen-evolving complex. Further inhibition of the remaining electron transport reactions occurs like in the donor-side mechanism. The mechanism is supported by the action spectrum of photoinhibition.

=== Singlet oxygen mechanisms ===
Inhibition of PSII is caused by singlet oxygen produced either by weakly coupled chlorophyll molecules or by cytochromes or iron–sulfur centers.

=== Low-light mechanism ===
Charge recombination reactions of PSII cause the production of triplet P_{680} and, as a consequence, singlet oxygen. Charge recombination is more probable under dim light than under higher light intensities.

== Kinetics and action spectrum ==
Photoinhibition follows simple first-order kinetics if measured from a lincomycin-treated leaf, cyanobacterial or algal cells, or isolated thylakoid membranes in which concurrent repair does not disturb the kinetics. Data from the group of W. S. Chow indicate that in leaves of pepper (Capsicum annuum), the first-order pattern is replaced by a pseudo-equilibrium even if the repair reaction is blocked. The deviation has been explained by assuming that photoinhibited PSII centers protect the remaining active ones. Both visible and ultraviolet light cause photoinhibition, ultraviolet wavelengths being much more damaging. Some researchers consider ultraviolet and visible light induced photoinhibition as a two different reactions, while others stress the similarities between the inhibition reactions occurring under different wavelength ranges.

== PSII repair cycle ==
Photoinhibition occurs continuously when plants or cyanobacteria are exposed to light, and the photosynthesizing organism must, therefore, continuously repair the damage. The PSII repair cycle, occurring in chloroplasts and in cyanobacteria, consists of degradation and synthesis of the D1 protein of the PSII reaction centre, followed by activation of the reaction center. Due to the rapid repair, most PSII reaction centers are not photoinhibited even if a plant is grown in strong light. However, environmental stresses, for example, extreme temperatures, salinity, and drought, limit the supply of carbon dioxide for use in carbon fixation, which decreases the rate of repair of PSII.

In photoinhibition studies, repair is often stopped by applying an antibiotic (lincomycin or chloramphenicol) to plants or cyanobacteria, which blocks protein synthesis in the chloroplast. Protein synthesis occurs only in an intact sample, so lincomycin is not needed when photoinhibition is measured from isolated membranes. The repair cycle of PSII recirculates other subunits of PSII (except for the D1 protein) from the inhibited unit to the repaired one.

== Protective mechanisms ==
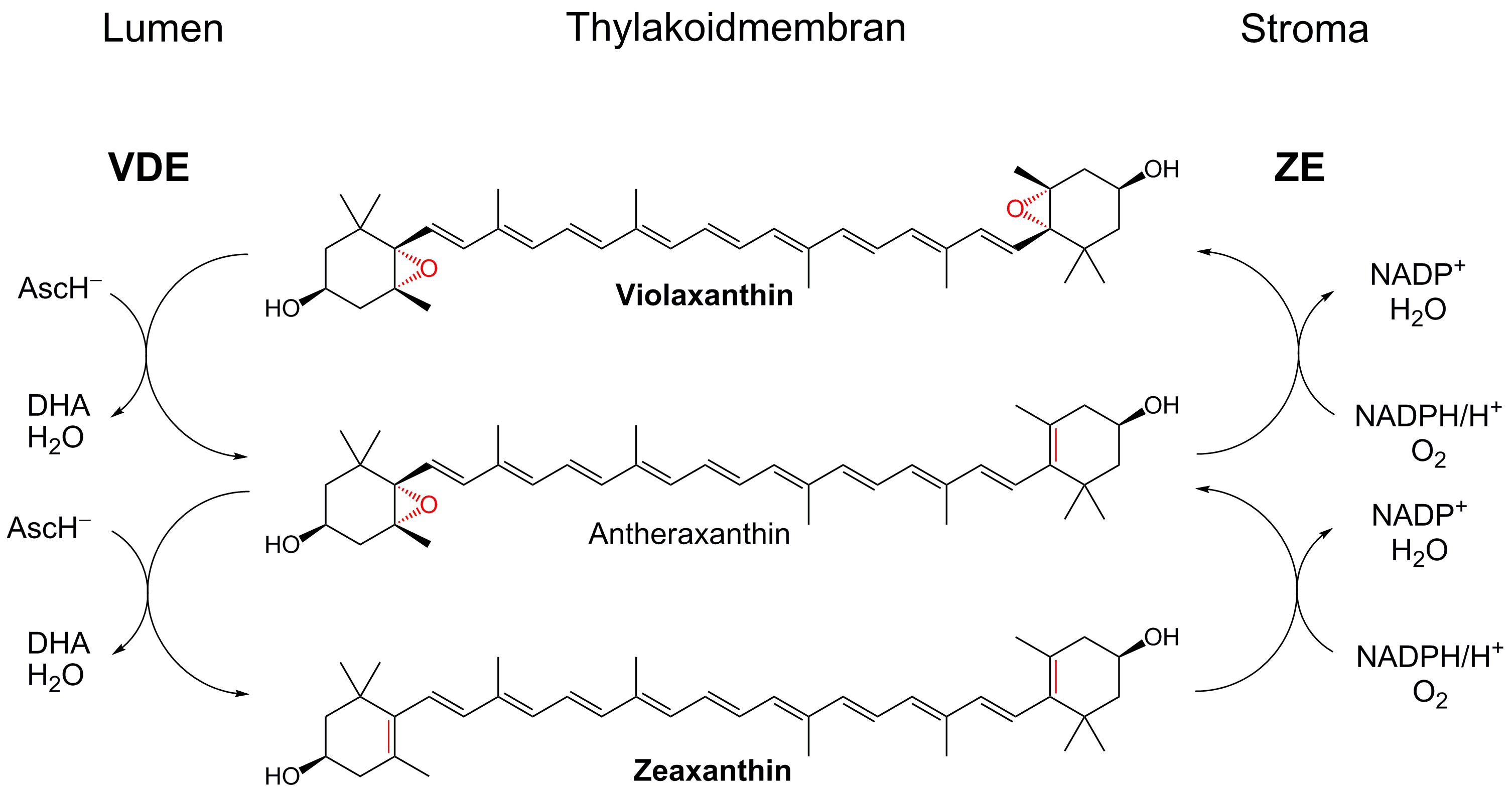
The xanthophyll cycle is important in protecting plants from photoinhibition

Plants have mechanisms that protect against adverse effects of strong light. The most studied biochemical protective mechanism is non-photochemical quenching of excitation energy. Visible-light-induced photoinhibition is ~25% faster in an Arabidopsis thaliana mutant lacking non-photochemical quenching than in the wild type. It is also apparent that turning or folding of leaves, as occurs, e.g., in Oxalis species in response to exposure to high light, protects against photoinhibition.

=== The PsBs Protein ===
Because there are a limited number of photosystems in the electron transport chain, organisms that are photosynthetic must find a way to combat excess light and prevent photo-oxidative stress, and likewise, photoinhibition, at all costs. In an effort to avoid damage to the D1 subunit of PSII and subsequent formation of ROS, the plant cell employs accessory proteins to carry the excess excitation energy from incoming sunlight; namely, the PsBs protein. Elicited by a relatively low luminal pH, plants have developed a rapid response to excess energy by which it is given off as heat and damage is reduced.

The studies of Tibiletti et al. (2016) found that PsBs is the main protein involved in sensing the changes in the pH and can therefore rapidly accumulate in the presence of high light. This was determined by performing SDS-PAGE and immunoblot assays, locating PsBs itself in the green alga, Chlamydomonas reinhardtii. Their data concluded that the PsBs protein belongs to a multigene family termed LhcSR proteins, including the proteins that catalyze the conversion of violaxanthin to zeaxanthin, as previously mentioned. PsBs is involved in the changing the orientation of the photosystems at times of high light to prompt the arrangement of a quenching site in the light harvesting complex.

Additionally, studies conducted by Glowacka et al. (2018) show that a higher concentration of PsBs is directly correlated to inhibiting stomatal aperture. But it does this without affecting CO_{2}intake and it increases water use efficiency of the plant. This was determined by controlling the expression of PsBs in Nicotinana tabacum by imposing a series of genetic modifications to the plant in order to test for PsBs levels and activity including: DNA transformation and transcription followed by protein expression. Research shows that stomatal conductance is heavily dependent on the presence of the PsBs protein. Thus, when PsBs was overexpressed in a plant, water uptake efficiency was seen to significantly improve, resulting in new methods for prompting higher, more productive crop yields.

These recent discoveries tie together two of the largest mechanisms in phytobiology; these are the influences that the light reactions have upon stomatal aperture via the Calvin Benson Cycle. To elaborate, the Calvin-Benson Cycle, occurring in the stroma of the chloroplast obtains its CO_{2} from the atmosphere which enters upon stomatal opening. The energy to drive the Calvin-Benson cycle is a product of the light reactions. Thus, the relationship has been discovered as such: when PsBs is silenced, as expected, the excitation pressure at PSII is increased. This in turn results in an activation of the redox state of Quinone A and there is no change in the concentration of carbon dioxide in the intracellular airspaces of the leaf; ultimately increasing stomatal conductance. The inverse relationship also holds true: when PsBs is over expressed, there is a decreased excitation pressure at PSII. Thus, the redox state of Quinone A is no longer active and there is, again, no change in the concentration of carbon dioxide in the intracellular airspaces of the leaf. All these factors work to have a net decrease of stomatal conductance.

== Measurement ==
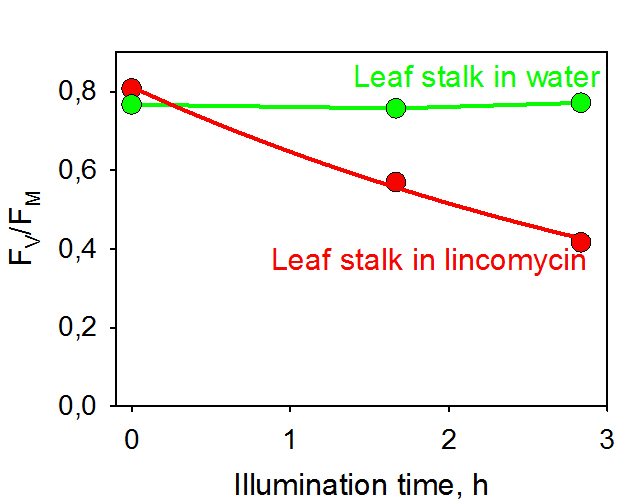
Effect of illumination on the ratio of variable to maximum fluorescence (F_{V}/F_{M}) of ground-ivy (Glechoma hederacea) leaves. Photon flux density was 1000 μmol m^{−2}s^{−1}, corresponding to half of full sunlight. Photoinhibition damages PSII at the same rate whether the leaf stalk is in water or lincomycin, but, in the “leaf stalk in water” sample, repair is so rapid that no net decrease in (F_{V}/F_{M}) occurs

Photoinhibition can be measured from isolated thylakoid membranes or their subfractions, or from intact cyanobacterial cells by measuring the light-saturated rate of oxygen evolution in the presence of an artificial electron acceptor (quinones and dichlorophenol-indophenol have been used).

The degree of photoinhibition in intact leaves can be measured using a fluorimeter to measure the ratio of variable to maximum value of chlorophyll a fluorescence (F_{V}/F_{M}). This ratio can be used as a proxy of photoinhibition because more energy is emitted as fluorescence from Chlorophyll a when many excited electrons from PSII are not captured by the acceptor and decay back to their ground state.

When measuring F_{V}/F_{M}, the leaf must be incubated in the dark for at least 10 minutes, preferably longer, before the measurement, in order to let non-photochemical quenching relax.

=== Flashing light ===
Photoinhibition can also be induced with short flashes of light using either a pulsed laser or a xenon flash lamp. When very short flashes are used, the photoinhibitory efficiency of the flashes depends on the time difference between the flashes. This dependence has been interpreted to indicate that the flashes cause photoinhibition by inducing recombination reactions in PSII, with subsequent production of singlet oxygen. The interpretation has been criticized by noting that the photoinhibitory efficiency of xenon flashes depends on the energy of the flashes even if such strong flashes are used that they would saturate the formation of the substrate of the recombination reactions.

== Dynamic photoinhibition ==
Some researchers prefer to define the term “photoinhibition” so that it contains all reactions that lower the quantum yield of photosynthesis when a plant is exposed to light. In this case, the term "dynamic photoinhibition" comprises phenomena that reversibly down-regulate photosynthesis in the light and the term "photodamage" or "irreversible photoinhibition" covers the concept of photoinhibition used by other researchers. The main mechanism of dynamic photoinhibition is non-photochemical quenching of excitation energy absorbed by PSII. Dynamic photoinhibition is acclimation to strong light rather than light-induced damage, and therefore "dynamic photoinhibition" may actually protect the plant against "photoinhibition".

== Ecology of photoinhibition ==
Photoinhibition may cause coral bleaching.

== See also ==
- Anthocyanin
- Chlorophyll
- Kautsky effect
- Light reaction
- Photosynthetic reaction centre
- Photosynthesis
