= Padimate A =

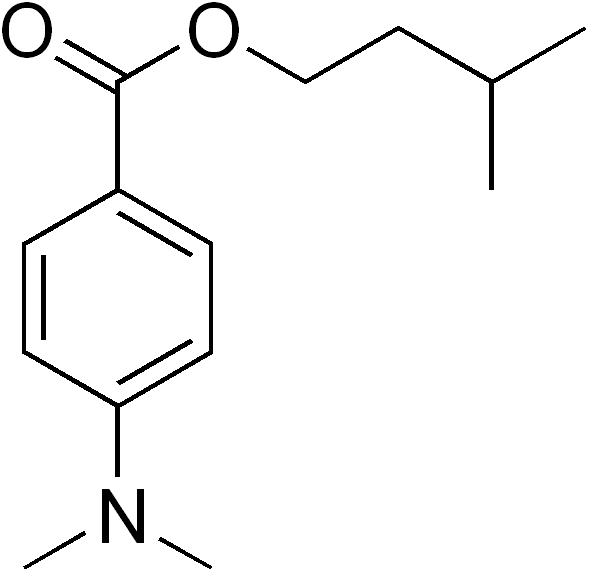

Names
- Preferred IUPAC name 3-Methylbutyl 4-(dimethylamino)benzoate
- Other names isoamyl dimethyl PABA; Escalol 506, 4-dimethylaminobenzoic acid isopentyl ester

Identifiers
CAS Number	21245-01-2
3D model (JSmol)	Interactive image
ChemSpider	80159
ECHA InfoCard	100.040.247
PubChem CID	88836
UNII	956679A27P
CompTox Dashboard (EPA)	DTXSID3046580
- InChI: InChI=1S/C14H21NO2/c1-11(2)9-10-17-14(16)12-5-7-13(8-6-12)15(3)4/h5-8,11H,9-10H2,1-4H3 Key: OFSAUHSCHWRZKM-UHFFFAOYSA-N; InChI=1/C14H21NO2/c1-11(2)9-10-17-14(16)12-5-7-13(8-6-12)15(3)4/h5-8,11H,9-10H2,1-4H3 Key: OFSAUHSCHWRZKM-UHFFFAOYAM
- SMILES: CC(C)CCOC(=O)c1ccc(cc1)N(C)C

Properties
Chemical formula	C_{14}H_{21}NO_{2}
Molar mass	235.322
Melting point	<25 °C
- Except where otherwise noted, data are given for materials in their standard state (at 25 °C [77 °F], 100 kPa). verify (what is ?) Infobox references

Padimate A is an organic compound that is an ingredient in some sunscreens. It is a dimethyl ester derivative of PABA. This aromatic chemical absorbs ultraviolet rays thereby preventing sunburn. However, its chemical structure and behaviour is similar to an industrial free radical generator. In Europe this chemical was withdrawn in 1989 for unstated reasons. In the US it was never approved for use in sunscreens.

== Photobiology ==
The photobiological properties of padimate O and padimate A resemble that of Michler's ketone. These compounds have been shown to increase the lethal effects of UV-radiation on cells. This photochemistry is relevant to the sunscreen controversy.

== See also ==
- Padimate O, a related sunscreen ingredient
