= NUTF2 =

Protein-coding gene in the species Homo sapiens

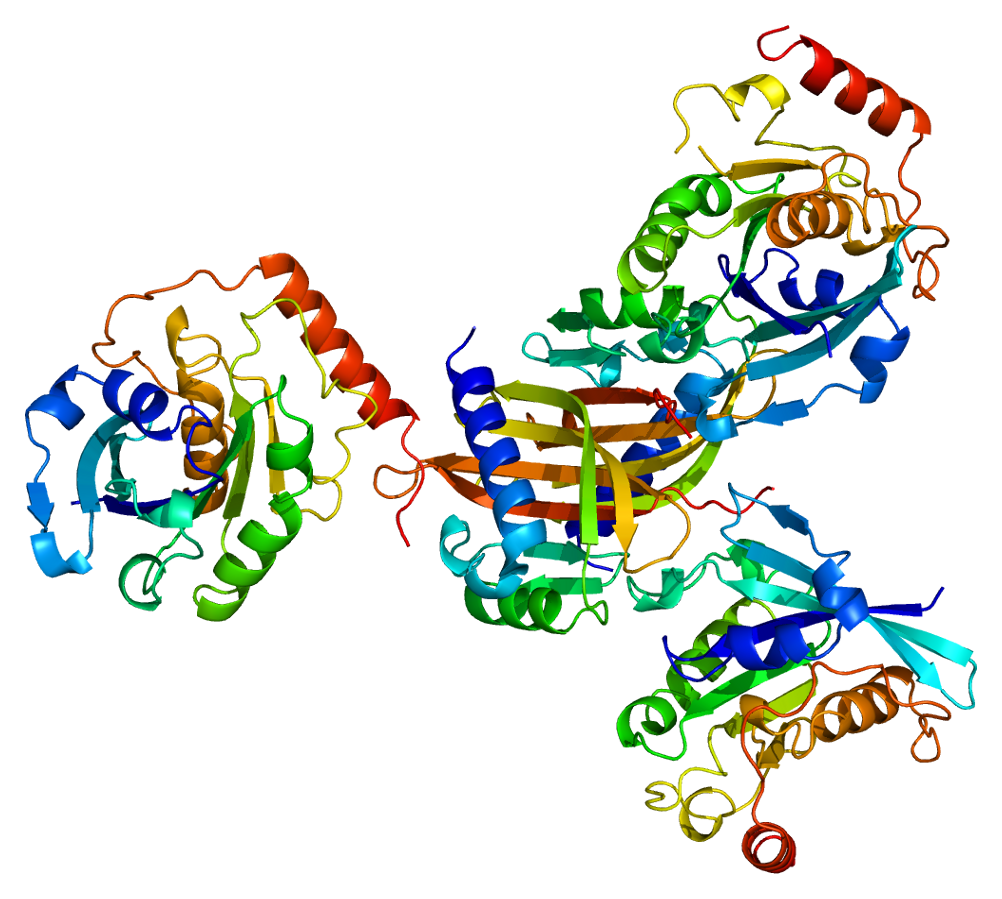
Available structures
PDB	Ortholog search: PDBe RCSB
PDB	List of PDB id codes 1GY5,%%s1GY6, 5BXQ, 1A2K, 1OUN

Identifiers
- Aliases: NUTF2, NTF2, PP15, NTF-2, nuclear transport factor 2
- External IDs: OMIM: 605813; MGI: 3704482; HomoloGene: 110745; GeneCards: NUTF2; OMA:NUTF2 - orthologs

Gene location (Human)
Chr.	Chromosome 16 (human)
Band	16q22.1	Start	67,846,923 bp
Band	16q22.1	End	67,872,567 bp
RNA expression pattern
Bgee	Human / Mouse (ortholog); Top expressed in: muscle of thigh; ascending aorta; popliteal artery; tibial arteries; left coronary artery; C1 segment; Descending thoracic aorta; right coronary artery; anterior cingulate cortex; stromal cell of endometrium / n/a; More reference expression data
BioGPS	n/a
Gene ontology
Molecular function	protein binding; structural constituent of nuclear pore; identical protein binding; nuclear import signal receptor activity
Cellular component	cytoplasm; nuclear pore central transport channel; nuclear outer membrane; intracellular anatomical structure; extracellular exosome; nucleus; nuclear inner membrane; nuclear pore; nucleoplasm; cytosol; membrane; nuclear membrane
Biological process	negative regulation of vascular endothelial growth factor production; protein transport; positive regulation of protein import into nucleus; protein export from nucleus; protein import into nucleus; mRNA transport; protein localization to nuclear pore; transport; nucleocytoplasmic transport
Sources:Amigo / QuickGO
Orthologs
Species	Human	Mouse
Entrez	10204	621832
Ensembl	ENSG00000102898	n/a
UniProt	P61970	P61971
RefSeq (mRNA)	NM_005796; NM_001322038; NM_001322039; NM_001322040; NM_001322041	XM_001473957
RefSeq (protein)	NP_001308967; NP_001308968; NP_001308969; NP_001308970; NP_005787 NP_005787.1; NP_001308967.1; NP_001308968.1; NP_001308969.1; NP_001308970.1	NP_080808; NP_001344158; NP_001344159
Location (UCSC)	Chr 16: 67.85 – 67.87 Mb	n/a
PubMed search
- Wikidata
View/Edit Human	View/Edit Mouse

Nuclear transport factor 2 is a protein that in humans is encoded by the NUTF2 gene.

== Function ==
The protein encoded by this gene is a cytosolic factor that facilitates protein transport into the nucleus. It interacts with the nuclear pore complex glycoprotein p62. This encoded protein acts at a relative late stage of nuclear protein import, subsequent to the initial docking of nuclear import ligand at the nuclear envelope. It is thought to be part of a multicomponent system of cytosolic factors that assemble at the pore complex during nuclear import.

== Interactions ==
NUTF2 has been shown to interact with Nucleoporin 62 and RAN.
