= Padimate O =

Water-insoluble oily ingredient used in some sunscreens

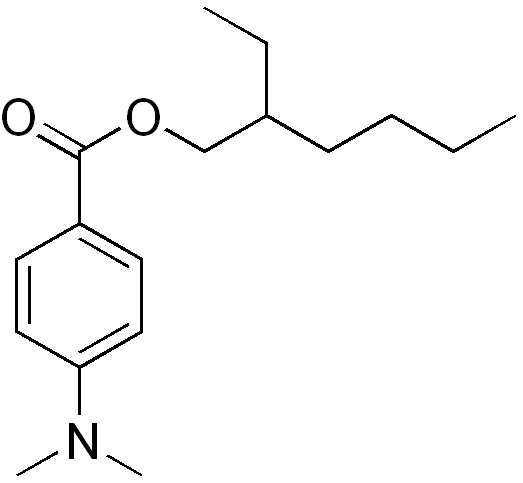

Names
- IUPAC name 2-ethylhexyl 4-(dimethylamino)benzoate
- Other names 2-ethylhexyl dimethyl PABA; Escalol 507; Sundown

Identifiers
CAS Number	21245-02-3
3D model (JSmol)	Interactive image
ChemSpider	28343
ECHA InfoCard	100.040.248
KEGG	D05335
PubChem CID	30541
UNII	Z11006CMUZ
CompTox Dashboard (EPA)	DTXSID7029320
- InChI: InChI=1S/C17H27NO2/c1-5-7-8-14(6-2)13-20-17(19)15-9-11-16(12-10-15)18(3)4/h9-12,14H,5-8,13H2,1-4H3 Key: WYWZRNAHINYAEF-UHFFFAOYSA-N; InChI=1/C17H27NO2/c1-5-7-8-14(6-2)13-20-17(19)15-9-11-16(12-10-15)18(3)4/h9-12,14H,5-8,13H2,1-4H3 Key: WYWZRNAHINYAEF-UHFFFAOYAL
- SMILES: O=C(OCC(CC)CCCC)c1ccc(N(C)C)cc1

Properties
Chemical formula	C_{17}H_{27}NO_{2}
Molar mass	277.408 g·mol^{−1}
Density	0.99 g/cm^{3}
Melting point	<25 °C
Boiling point	362 °C (684 °F; 635 K)

Hazards
NFPA 704 (fire diamond)	1 1 0
- Except where otherwise noted, data are given for materials in their standard state (at 25 °C [77 °F], 100 kPa). verify (what is ?) Infobox references

Padimate O is an organic compound related to the water-soluble compound PABA (4-aminobenzoic acid) that is used as an ingredient in some sunscreens. This yellowish water-insoluble oily liquid is an ester formed by the condensation of 2-ethylhexanol with dimethylaminobenzoic acid. Other names for padimate O include 2-ethylhexyl 4-dimethylaminobenzoate, Escalol 507, octyldimethyl PABA, and OD-PABA.

== Photobiology ==
Padimate O absorbs ultraviolet rays, thereby preventing direct DNA damage by UV-B. However, the thus-excited padimate O molecule may then react with DNA to produce indirect DNA damage, similar to the effects of ionizing radiation. An in vitro yeast study conducted in 1993 demonstrated the sunlight-induced mutagenicity of padimate O. The photobiological properties of padimate O resemble those of Michler's ketone, which is considered photocarcinogenic in rats and mice. These findings suggest that padimate O might also be photocarcinogenic.

However, multiple in vivo studies conducted in hairless mice following topical application of padimate O have demonstrated no carcinogenic effects and that padimate O reduces the number of and delays the appearance of UV-induced skin tumors.

== See also ==
- Padimate A, a related sunscreen ingredient
- Sunscreen controversy.
