= Non-photochemical quenching =

Biological mechanism in plants and algae

Non-photochemical quenching (NPQ) is a mechanism employed by plants and algae to protect themselves from the adverse effects of high light intensity. It involves the quenching of singlet excited state chlorophylls (Chl) via enhanced internal conversion to the ground state (non-radiative decay), thus harmlessly dissipating excess excitation energy as heat through molecular vibrations. NPQ occurs in almost all photosynthetic eukaryotes (algae and plants), and helps to regulate and protect photosynthesis in environments where light energy absorption exceeds the capacity for light utilization in photosynthesis.

== Process ==
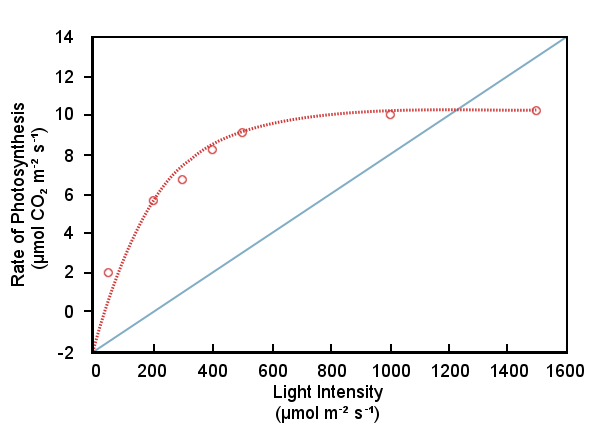
Carbon assimilation (red line) tends to saturate at high light intensities, while light absorption (blue line) increases linearly

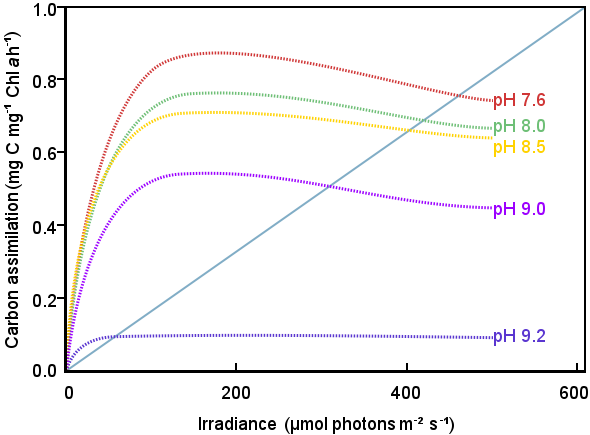
The relationship between irradiance and carbon assimilation for a monoculture of the plankton Woloszynskia halophila at different pH

When a molecule of chlorophyll absorbs light it is promoted from its ground state to its first singlet excited state. The excited state then has three main fates. Either the energy is; 1. passed to another chlorophyll molecule by Förster resonance energy transfer (in this way excitation is gradually passed to the photochemical reaction centers (photosystem I and photosystem II) where energy is used in photosynthesis (called photochemical quenching)); or 2. the excited state can return to the ground state by emitting the energy as heat (called non-photochemical quenching); or 3. the excited state can return to the ground state by emitting a photon (fluorescence).

In higher plants, the absorption of light continues to increase as light intensity increases, while the capacity for photosynthesis tends to saturate. Therefore, there is the potential for the absorption of excess light energy by photosynthetic light harvesting systems. This excess excitation energy leads to an increase in the lifetime of singlet excited chlorophyll, increasing the chances of the formation of long-lived chlorophyll triplet states by inter-system crossing. Triplet chlorophyll is a potent photosensitiser of molecular oxygen forming singlet oxygen which can cause oxidative damage to the pigments, lipids and proteins of the photosynthetic thylakoid membrane. To counter this problem, one photoprotective mechanism is so-called non-photochemical quenching (NPQ), which relies upon the conversion and dissipation of the excess excitation energy into heat. NPQ involves conformational changes within the light harvesting proteins of photosystem (PS) II (known as LHCII) that bring about a change in pigment interactions causing the formation of energy traps. The conformational changes are stimulated by a combination of transmembrane proton gradient, the photosystem II subunit S (PsbS) and the enzymatic conversion of the carotenoid violaxanthin to zeaxanthin (the xanthophyll cycle) within LHCII.

== Measurement of NPQ ==
Non-photochemical quenching is measured by the quenching of chlorophyll fluorescence and is distinguished from photochemical quenching by applying a bright light pulse under actinic light to transiently saturate photosystem II reaction center and compare the maximal yield of fluorescence emission under light and dark-adapted state. Non-photochemical quenching is not affected if the pulse of light is short. During this pulse, the fluorescence reaches the level reached in the absence of any photochemical quenching, known as maximum fluorescence, $F_m$.

For further discussion, see Measuring chlorophyll fluorescence and Plant stress measurement.

Chlorophyll fluorescence can easily be measured with a chlorophyll fluorometer. Some fluorometers can calculate NPQ and photochemical quenching coefficients (including qP, qN, qE and NPQ), as well as light and dark adaptation parameters (including Fo, Fm, and Fv/Fm).

== See also ==
- Chlorophyll fluorescence
- Measuring chlorophyll fluorescence
- Integrated fluorometer
