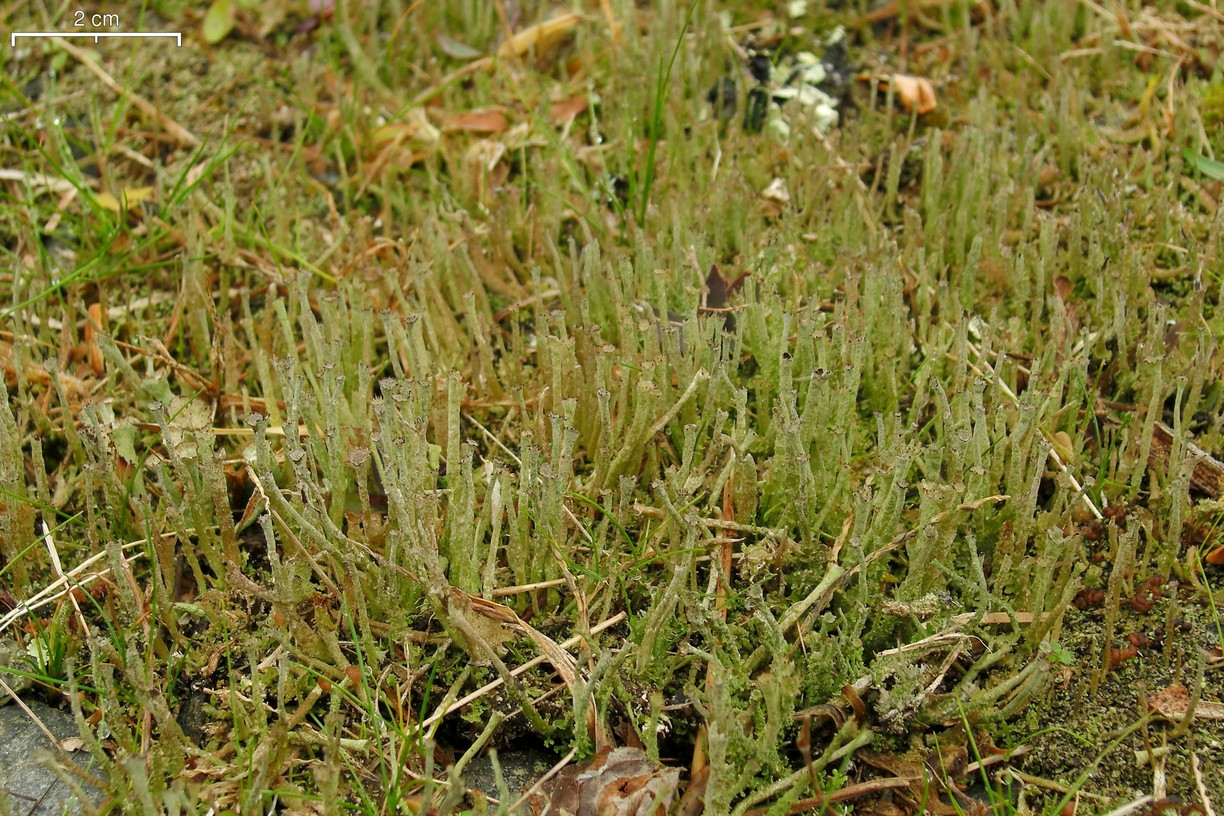

Conservation status
- Secure (NatureServe)

Scientific classification
- Kingdom: Fungi
- Division: Ascomycota
- Class: Lecanoromycetes
- Order: Lecanorales
- Family: Cladoniaceae
- Genus: Cladonia
- Species: C. rei

Binomial name
- Cladonia rei Schaer. (1823)

Synonyms
- List: *Baeomyces radicatus var. nemoxynus Ach. (1803); *Cladonia cornuta var. rei (Schaer.) Schaer. (1850); *Cladonia cornutoradiata var. nemoxyna (Ach.) Oxner (1937); *Cladonia fimbriata f. nemoxyna (Ach.) Leight. (1867); *Cladonia fimbriata f. rei (Schaer.) Vain. (1894); *Cladonia fimbriata var. nemoxyna (Ach.) Coem. (1865); *Cladonia nemoxyna (Ach.) Arnold (1888); *Cladonia pyxidata f. nemoxyna (Ach.) Coem. (1863); *Scyphophorus pyxidatus var. nemoxyna (Ach.) Gray (1821)

= Cladonia rei =

Species of lichen

Cladonia rei, commonly known as the wand lichen, is a species of ground-dwelling, fruticose lichen in the family Cladoniaceae. It is a widely distributed species, having been reported from Africa, Asia, Australasia, Europe, and North America. It is identified by its slightly dirty-colored, rough-surfaced, slender podetia that grow up to 9 cm (3.5 in) tall. Diagnostic characters of the lichen include the continuously sorediate, green-and-brown-mottled, podetia that taper upward to a point, while chemically, it contains homosekikaic and sekikaic acids. Its reduced capacity to bioaccumulate toxic heavy metals from its surroundings, as well as its ability to switch photobiont partners, allows the lichen to colonize and survive highly polluted habitats. There are several other Cladonia species that are somewhat similar in appearance, but can be distinguished either by subtle differences in morphology, or by the secondary chemicals they contain.

== Taxonomy ==
The species was first described scientifically in 1823 by Swiss lichenologist Ludwig Emanuel Schaerer. It is named after Professor Re from Turin, who had sent the specimens to Schaerer from Italy. In his original description, Schaerer noted the new lichen's similarity to Cladonia gracilis. Schaerer's type specimen, kept at the herbarium of the Conservatoire et Jardin botaniques de la Ville de Genève, contains both homosekikaic and fumarprotocetraric acids. In the genus Cladonia, C. rei is a member of clade Cladonia, subclade Graciles.

In North America Cladonia rei is commonly known as the wand lichen, or the sordid powderhorn.

=== Synonymy ===
In an 1850 publication, Schaerer proposed that the taxon was better classified as a variety of Cladonia cornuta. In 1894, Finnish lichenologist and Cladonia specialist Edvard August Vainio proposed it as a form of Cladonia fimbriata. The two proposed names are now considered homotypic or nomenclatural synonyms of Cladonia rei.

In 1976, Haavard Østhagen proposed that Cladonia nemoxyna, a taxon originally described by Erik Acharius in 1803, should be considered a synonym of Cladonia rei. This nomenclatural possibility had been suggested already a decade earlier by Juha Suominen and Teuvo Ahti when they typified the name in a 1966 publication. This name, and several other with the varietal or form epithet nemoxyna are heterotypic (taxonomic) synonyms of Cladonia rei.

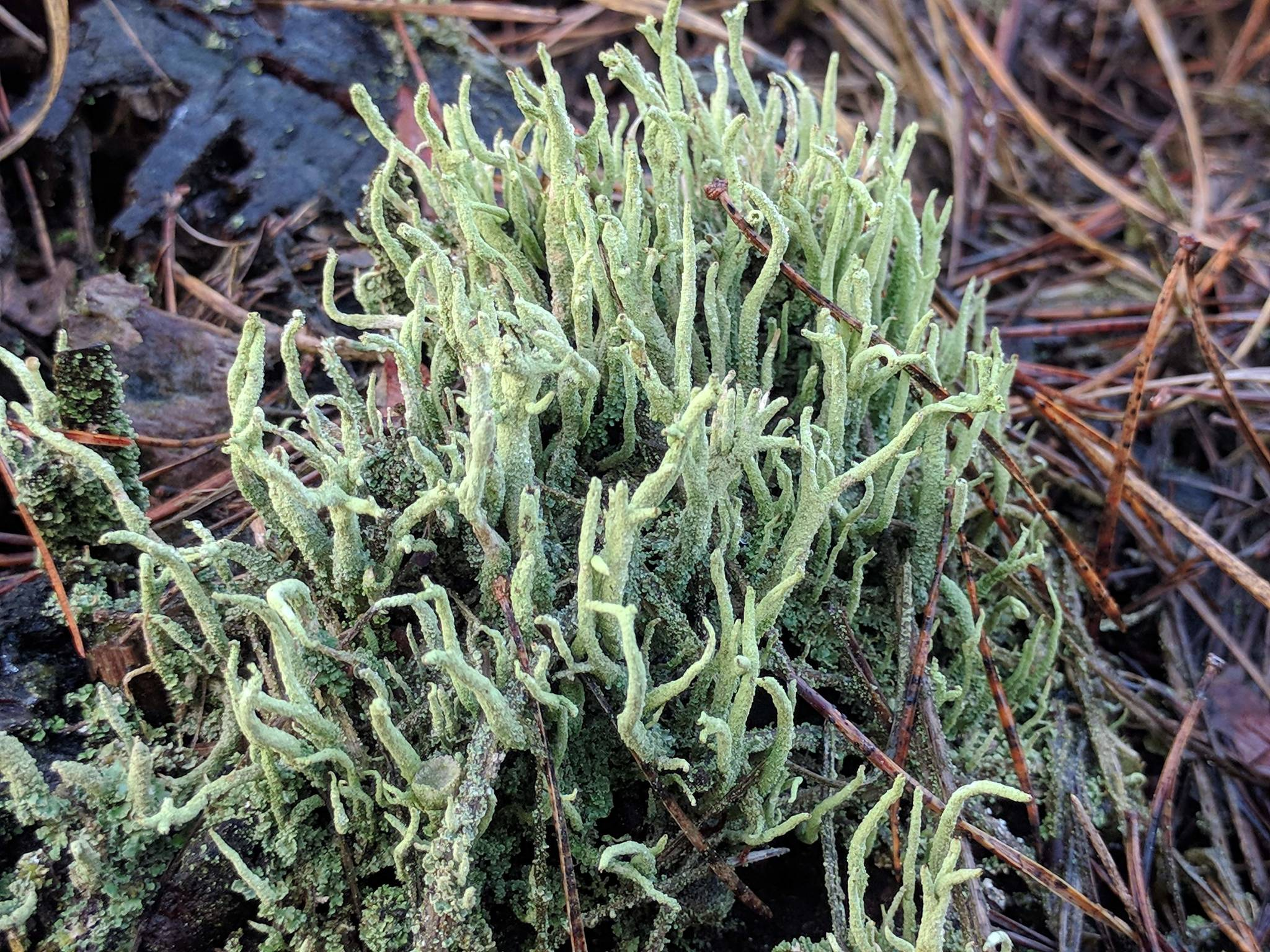
Cladonia subulata, shown here, is difficult to reliably distinguish from C. rei without using chemical techniques.

Cladonia rei is morphologically similar to Cladonia subulata, and the two are difficult to distinguish. In 1993, Paus and colleagues studied all of the morphological characteristics that were used to distinguish between the two species, and concluded that there were none that could sufficiently distinguish between the two, but they could still be considered distinct species due to their different habitat preferences. Leo Spier and André Aptroot conducted a chemical and morphological study on about 350 mostly West European specimens of Cladonia subulata and C. rei. They found about a third of the specimens that had been identified based on inferences about their habitat had been misidentified. They also reported that the long-wave UV test—the standard method for distinguishing between the two species in the field—was unreliable for detecting homosekikaic acid. As a result, many of the previous records of these taxa should also be considered unreliable. They concluded that there was "no indication of any correlation between chemistry and geography, morphology or substratum", and that C. rei should be considered a chemotype of Cladonia subulata, rather than a distinct species. They proposed that C. rei be placed in synonymy with Cladonia subulata, because the latter, as the older of the two names, has priority.

Some studies published soon challenged Spier and Aptroot's proposal. Authors of a study of this taxon in Poland argued that the species should remain distinct, largely because "Their conclusions were based on material mostly from the Netherlands, with rather scanty representatives from other countries". After analysing almost 800 collections, they determined that 90% of the 228 specimens of C. rei had been misidentified, a figure they attributed to the original collectors not having corroborated their determinations with thin layer chromatography to accurately assess the chemistry. In 2010, a molecular phylogenetics study, showed the subclade of C. subulata to be distinct from C. rei. The authors propose that the determining chemical feature for C. rei is the presence of homosekikaic acid. Additional molecular support for separate species in another study also used scanning electron microscopy of the stereome surfaces that revealed distinct differences between the two species.

== Description ==
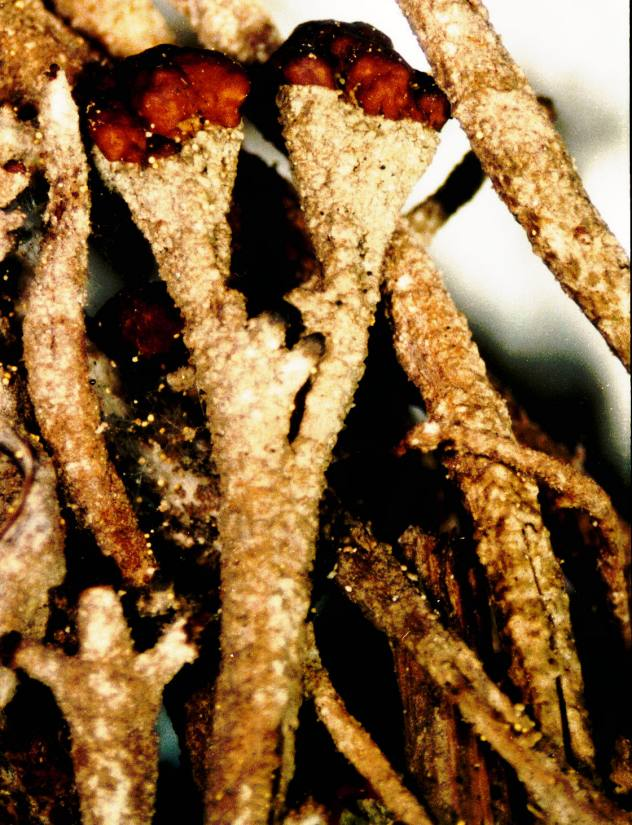
Photograph of a herbarium specimen taken through a dissecting microscope (x12) showing terminal apothecia

Primary squamules are small and inconspicuous, often disappearing. Podetia are gray-green to olive, sometimes browned, slender, coarsely or finely sorediate on the upper half. They have dimensions in the range of 2–9 cm (13/16–3 9/16 in) tall by 1–2 mm (up to 3.5 mm) thick. They have with narrow, symmetrical, or, more frequently lopsided cups, proliferating at the margins to resemble a star or magic wand. Pale to dark brown apothecia are common on proliferations along the cup margins. It is prudent to take heed of Spier and Aptroot's thoughts: "There is much individual variation between the specimens, which can vary from nearly unbranched to cup-shaped, from slender (less than 1 mm thick) to robust (reaching 5 mm) and from low (average height below 2 cm) to high (height over 5 cm, clearly higher than the surrounding Cladonia species). The distribution of these forms over the chemotypes is on the whole largely similar and differentiating characteristics could not be found." Further, it is known that growth in contaminated sites can influence the growth and development of the Cladonia thalli, sometimes resulting in features that do not coincide with the normal taxonomic definition of the species. This phenomenon has been documented with Cladonia rei.

=== Chemistry ===
Chemical spot tests are undergone for identification. C.rei responds to P+ red for fumarprotocetraric acid, P− and UV+ white for homosekikaic acid. PD reactions also turn C.rei yellow in low presences of fumarprotocetraric acid.

Cladonia rei invariably contains homosekikaic acid; sometimes it also has fumarprotocetraric acid. It also has smaller amounts of sekikaic acid, and well as trace amounts of the accessory substance 4'-O-methylnorhomosekikaic acid. The positive fluorescence of an ultraviolet test is traditionally used to detect the presence of homosekikaic acid. It can also be tested using the ferric chloride chemical spot test, which produces a violet-coloured spot if positive. Other compounds that have been found in the lichen include antheraxanthin, astaxanthin, α-carotene, ε-carotene, β-cryptoxanthin, lutein, lutein epoxide, and violaxanthin.

=== Similar species ===
Cladonia subulata and Cladonia ochrochlora are similar species that can be distinguished by their secondary chemistry. Fumarprotocetraric acid is the only main lichen metabolite in C. subulata. Another lookalike, Cladonia glauca, contains squamatic acid, a substance that causes it to glow white when lit with a UV light. It also has a narrow longitudinal slit in most podetia. Lots of details available. Cladonia cenotea might be closely related. Cladonia coniocraea and Cladonia cornuta tend to have larger primary squamules and do not normally proliferate at the cup margins; neither contains homosekikaic acid.

Cladonia lookalikes
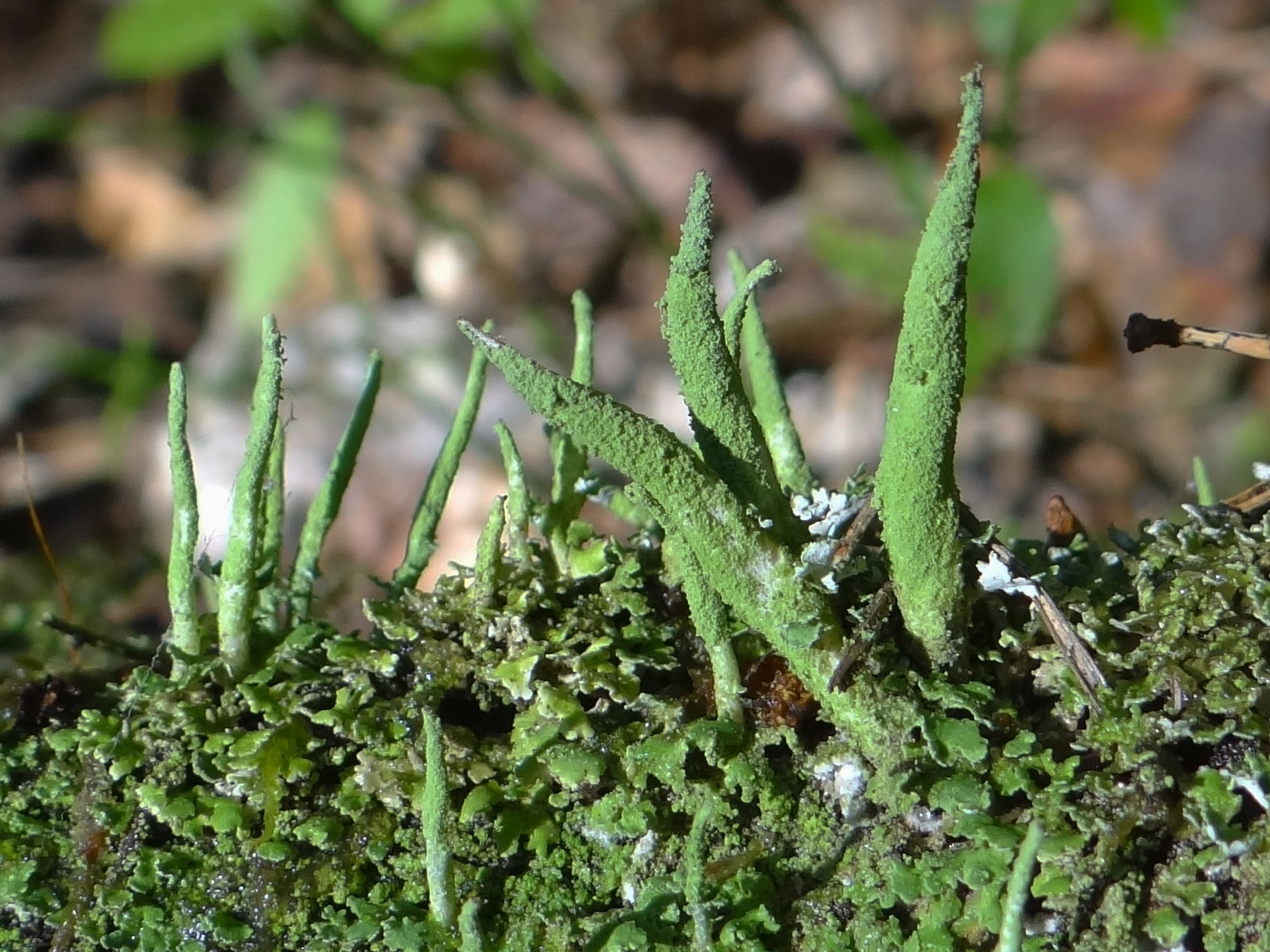
C. coniocraea

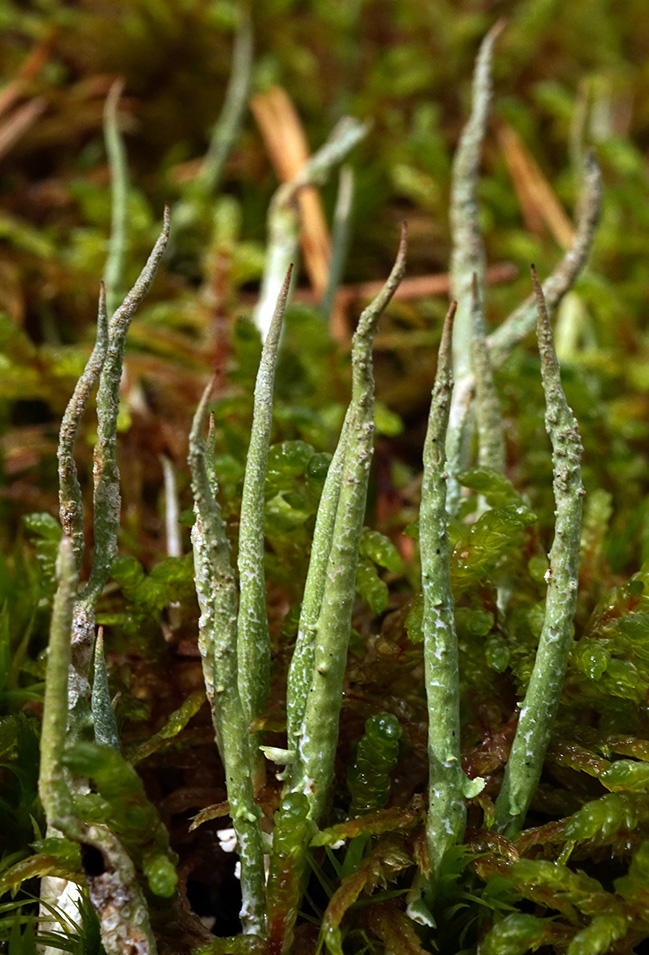
C. cornuta

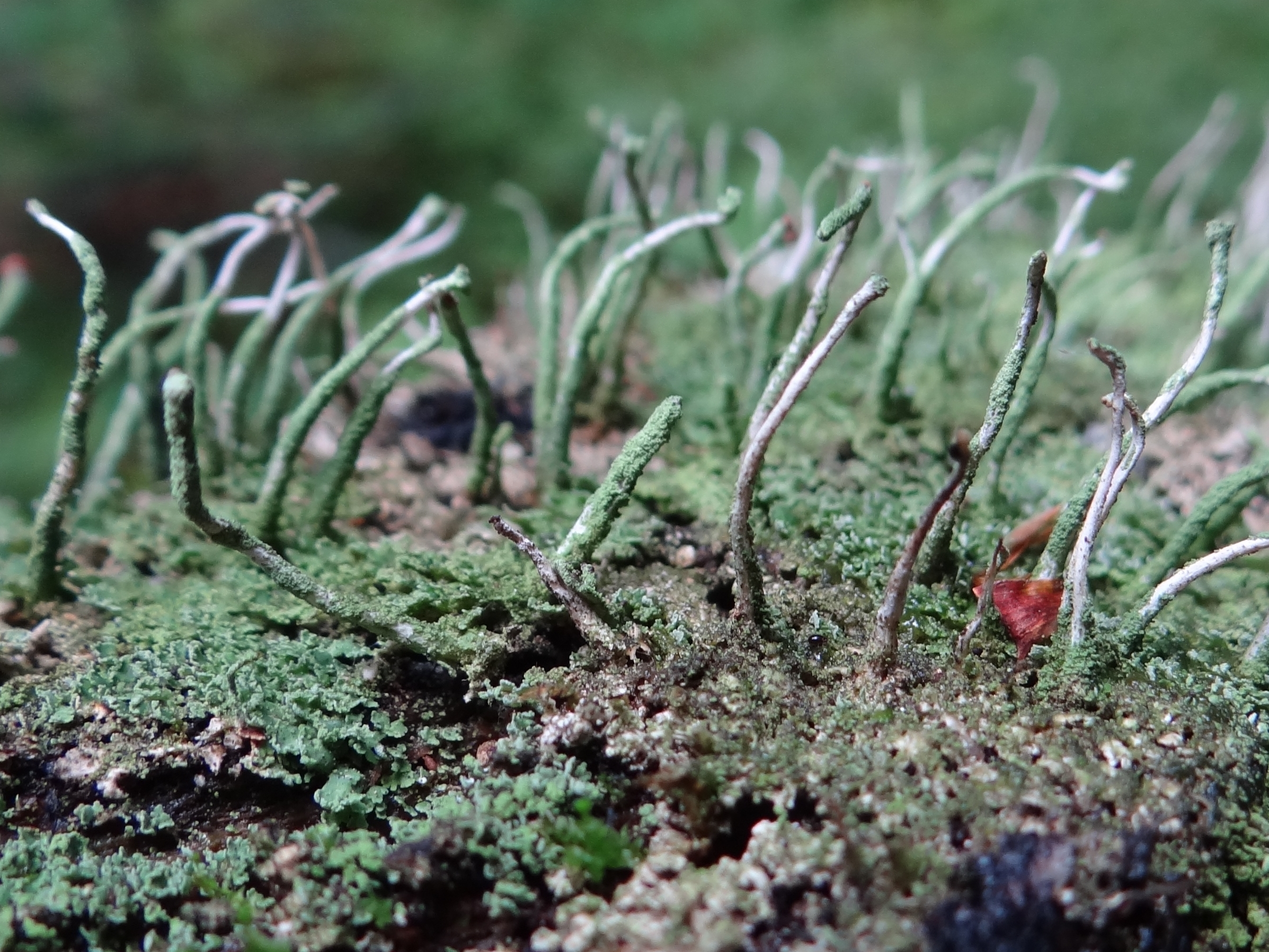
C. glauca

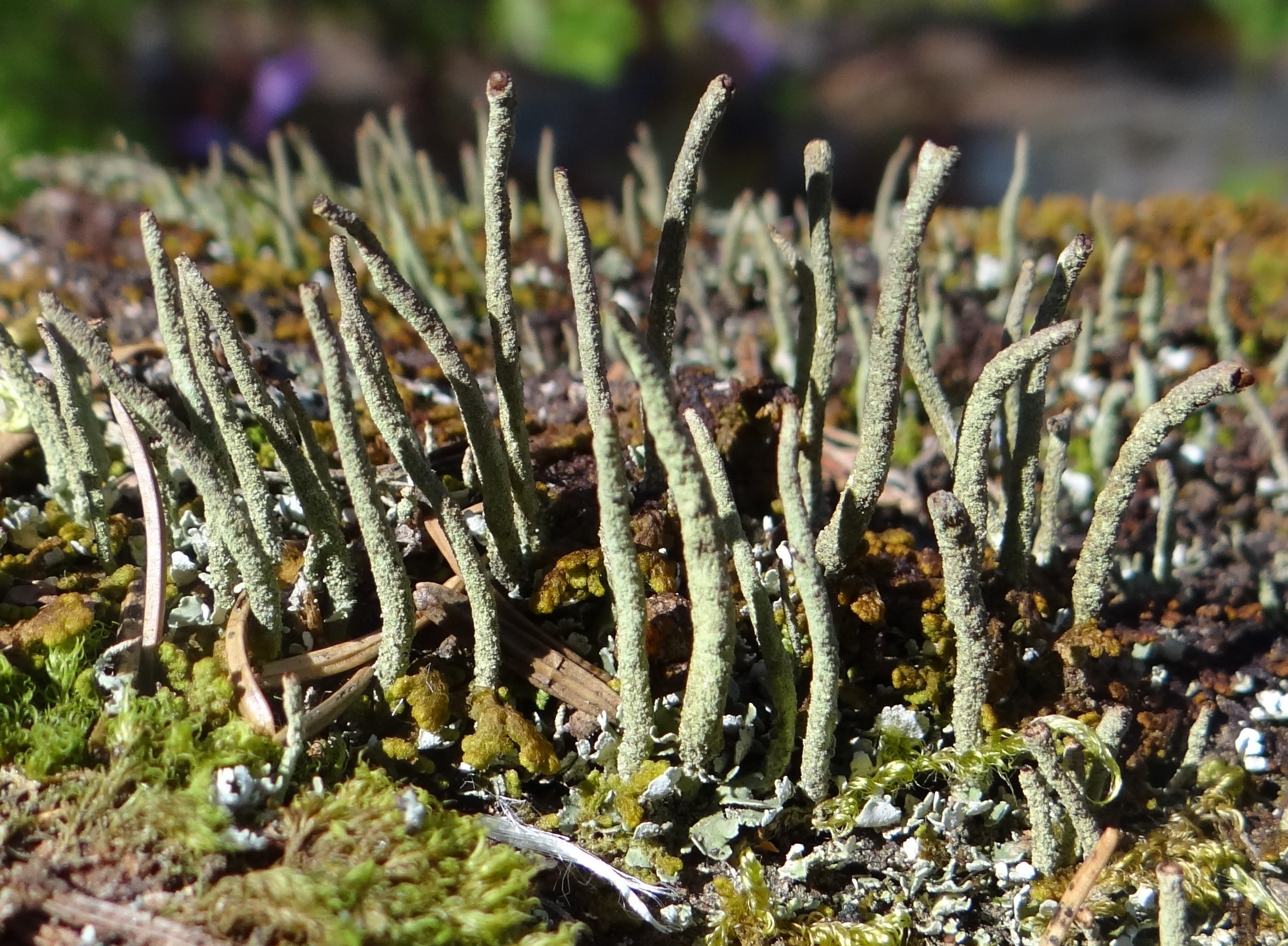
C. ochrochlora

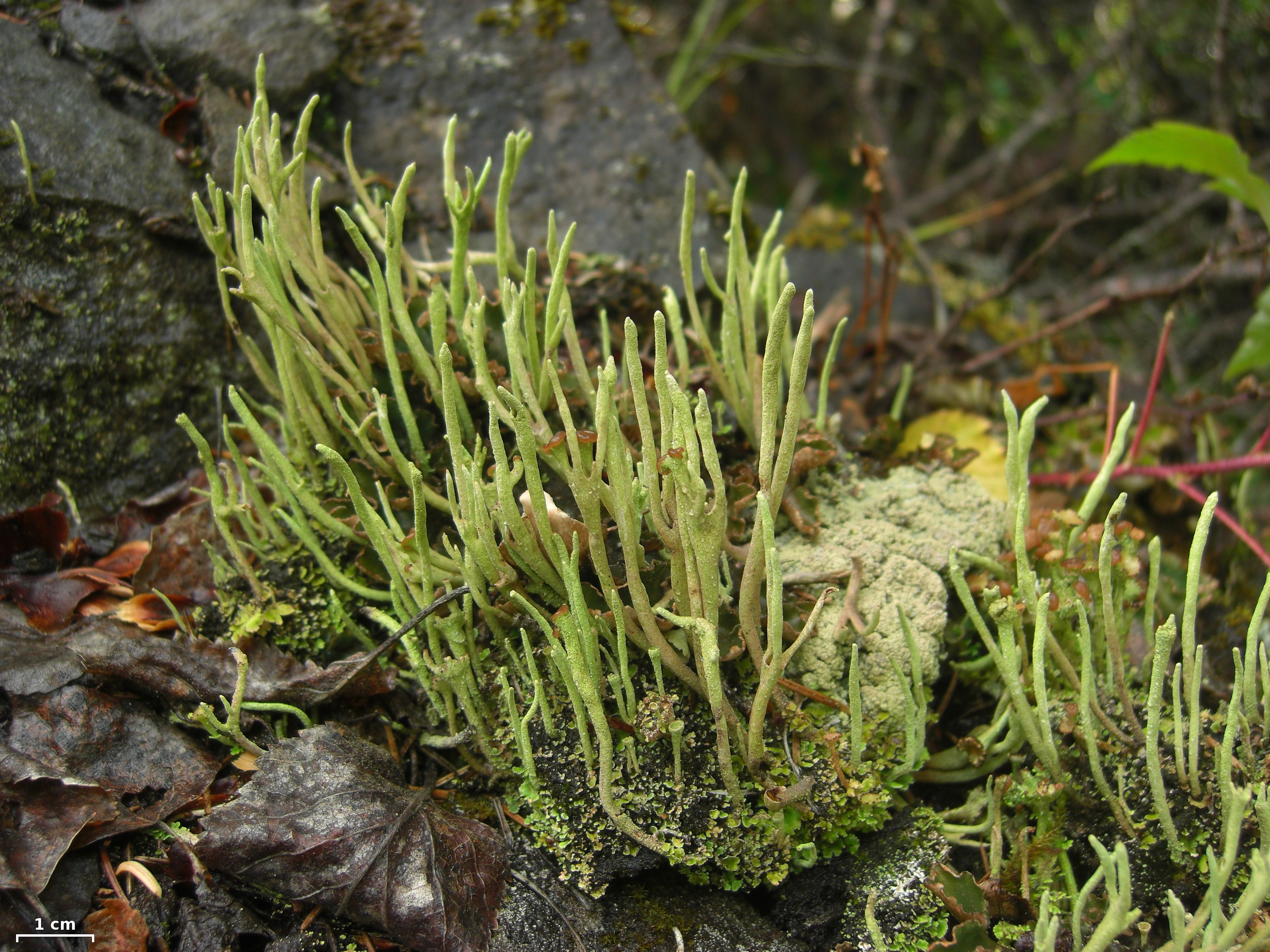
C. subulata

== Habitat and distribution ==
Cladonia rei is a terricolous lichen that grows in soil, although more rarely it is found on rotting wood, and there are few records of it growing on other substrates, including rock, plastic, old straw, and mosses over rocks. It prefers open areas with low humus content and a substrate with a more or less neutral soil pH. often in dry and sunny places like grasslands, heaths and wastelands. Another favoured habitat is limestone cliffs and limestone meadows, although the lichen is also found in disturbed areas, such as road embankments, gravel pits, or house ruins. It is a pioneer species: able to quickly colonise bare ground, particularly in disturbed and anthropogenic habitats. In some cases, it can grow on impoverished soil with high heavy metal content. In Krompachy (Slovakia), the lichen, along with the moss Ceratodon purpureus, was found to be very abundant in bare acid soil near copper smelters, where all vascular plants were severely damaged or have disappeared. It is prevalent in temperate or somewhat arid regions, and does not occur in the Arctic or the Antarctic. The lichen was used as a case study for a large-scale biodiversity monitoring program in Alberta, Canada. Historical records and collections suggested that the lichen was broadly distributed but rare in the province, but more recent material from surveys conducted by the Alberta Biodiversity Monitoring Institute showed that its distribution is entirely limited to the dry mixed grassland, northern fescue grassland and aspen parkland natural regions, where it is relatively common.

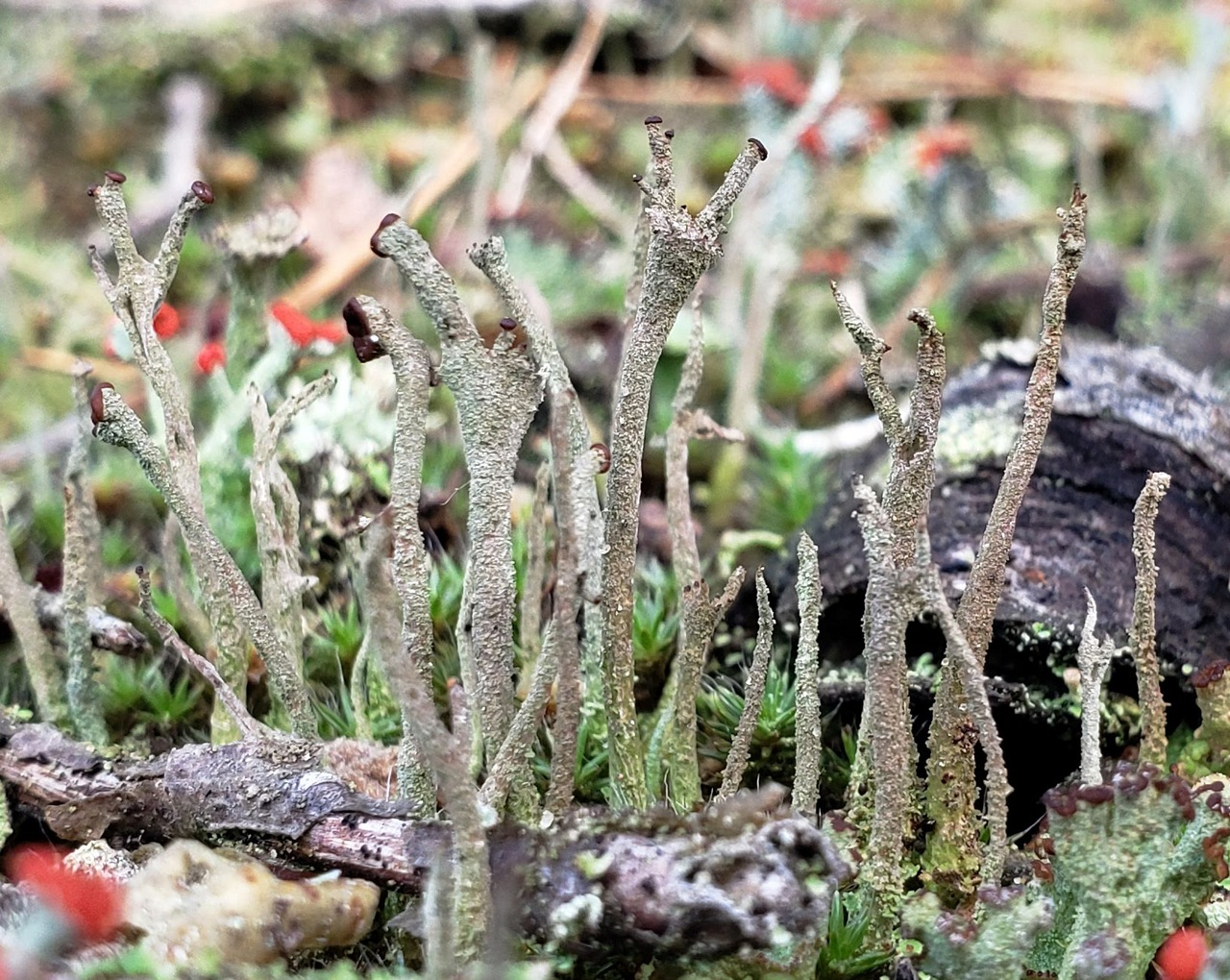
Cladonia rei growing in sand amongst mosses and other Cladonia species, in Buckhorn State Park, Wisconsin, USA

It is a widespread species, with a range extending to Europe, Africa, Asia, Australasia, North America, and South America. It is widely distributed in Europe, having been recorded in Austria, Belgium and Luxemburg, Czech Republic, Estonia, Lithuania, Norway, Poland, Slovakia, Spain, and Sweden. More recently, it was reported from Armenia, from the coastal sand-dunes of Portugal, and, in 2021, from the Pyrénées-Orientales in the French Mediterranean region. Its Australasian distribution includes both Australia and New Zealand. It was reported as new to India in 2002. In 2006 it was recorded from Iran and Turkey.

In the United States, it has been considered by some authors to be widely distributed in the northwestern part of the country, but probably because of misidentification with the much more common C. ochlorochlora and C. verruculosa. Samuel Hammer suggests that the actual range in the region is limited to interior localities east of the Cascade Mountains, in Idaho and Washington.

== Pollution tolerance ==
Because the lichen has often been recorded growing in extremely contaminated post-smelting slag dumps, its bioaccumulative abilities have been studied. The lichen has developed a restrained heavy-metal accumulation pattern that limits its exposure to these toxic compounds, and helps it to colonise these contaminated sites. Efficient methods have been developed for extracting arsenic compounds from this species; in an arsenic-contaminated environment, Cladonia rei was shown to contain arsenous acid, arsenic acid, methylarsonic acid, dimethylarsinic acid, arsenobetaine, and trimethylarsine oxide. Its high genetic variability within a single population is suggestive of great potential for colonising anthropogenic habitats, and underlies the role of this lichen as a pioneer in the early stages of natural regeneration of these contaminated sites. Cladonia rei has a low bioaccumulation factor, meaning it is classified as a weak accumulator of heavy metals. Its erect and fruticose growth form help it survive in this polluted environment, due to the decrease in metal content along the vertical gradient of the thallus. The level of cell membrane damage in the lichen is dependent on the heavy level concentrations of the polluted site. The amount of cell damage can be measured experimentally by determining relative electrical conductivity, and thus, this physiological parameter can serve as an early warning indicator for detection of elevated metal concentrations in soil.

A phytosociological study of the pioneer lichen communities associated with Cladonia rei in Polish post-smelting dumps showed the frequent co-occurrence of Diploschistes muscorum and Cladonia conista. In non-polluted sites, typical lichen associations include C. chlorophaea, C. fimbriata, C. pyxidata, Ceratodon purpureus, and Peltigera didactyla. In northeastern North America, it is noted to be a common pioneer species in old field succession, along with Cladonia cristellata and Cladonia polycarpoides. It is also a characteristic species of cryptogamic communities in dry grasslands of Saskatchewan, and anthropogenic habitats in Germany. Some cryptogamic communities, including those involving C. rei, are quite similar in Europe and North America, even though the vascular plant species composition often differs considerably.

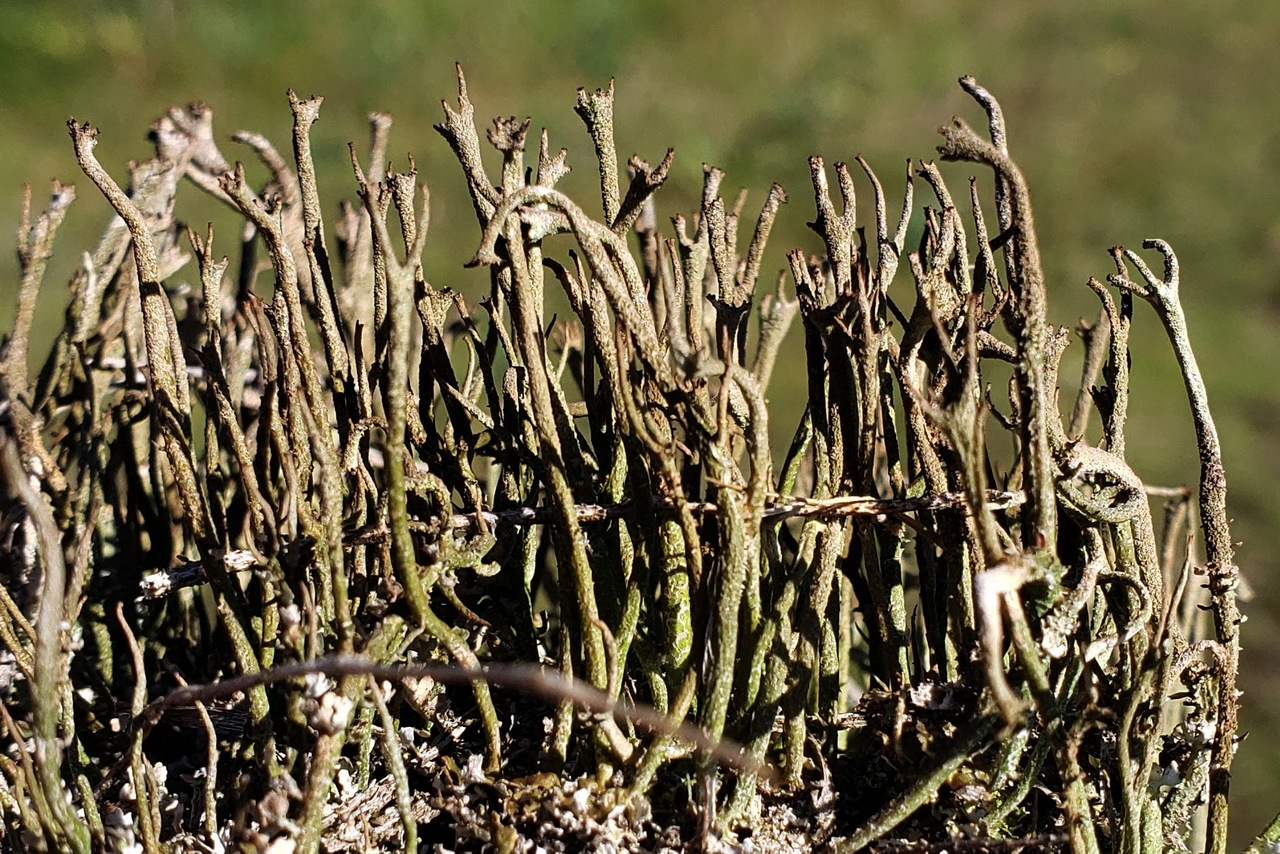
Here C. rei is a component of a biological soil crust in Wisconsin, USA

== Ecology ==
Epicladonia sandstedei is a lichenicolous fungus that parasitises Cladonia rei.

In a study of the oribatid mite communities associated with three Cladonia species in a heavily contaminated habitat, Cladonia rei was shown to provide a good habitat for mites. Because of the great variation in the growth forms of its podetia, densely covered with propagules such as corticated granules, squamules and microsquamules as well as numerous non-corticated, farinose-to-granular soredia, the surface area/volume ratio of the lichen is higher compared to other studied Cladonia species. The rugged surface texture provides more microhabitats for both mites and the particles of organic matter that are their diet. This contrasts with Cladonia cariosa and Cladonia pyxidata, which have a less diverse morphology, and a lower diversity of oribatid inhabitants.

The photobiont partners of Cladonia rei are to some extent dependent upon the environment. Although both Asterochloris and Trebouxia can associate with the fungus, "the presence of Trebouxia was directly related to anthropogenic sites with technogenic substrates, and the proportion of lichen specimens with these algae clearly depended on the level of heavy-metal soil pollution and the habitat type. Although Cladonia lichens were previously thought to be restricted to Asterochloris, they are able to start the relichenization process with Trebouxia under specific habitat conditions and to establish a stable association with these algae when colonization of disturbed sites takes place."

== See also ==
- List of Cladonia species
