= C40H56 =

The molecular formula C_{40}H_{56} (molar mass: 536.87 g/mol) may refer to:

- Carotenes
  - α-Carotene
  - β-Carotene
  - γ-Carotene
  - δ-Carotene
  - ε-Carotene
- Lycopene
