= C13H20O =

The molecular formula C_{13}H_{20}O (molar mass: 192.30 g/mol, exact mass: 192.1514 u) may refer to:

- Damascone
- Ionone
