= C40H74 =

The molecular formula C_{40}H_{74} (molar mass: 555.03 g/mol) may refer to:

- Chlorobactane, a bio-marker for green sulphur bacteria
- Okenane, a bio-marker for purple sulphur bacteria
