= Δ-Carotene =

δ-Carotene

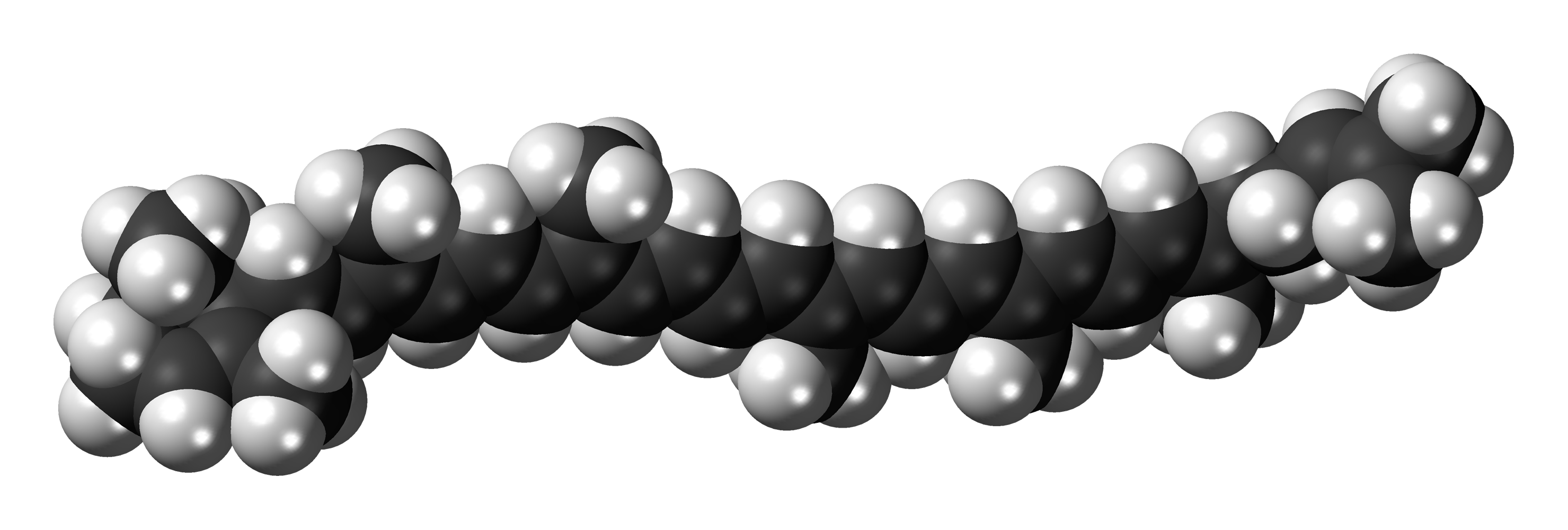

Names
- IUPAC name ε,ψ-Carotene
- Systematic IUPAC name (6R)-6-[(1E,3E,5E,7E,9E,11E,13E,15E,17E,19E)-3,7,12,16,20,24-Hexamethylpentacosa-1,3,5,7,9,11,13,15,17,19,23-undecaen-1-yl]-1,5,5-trimethylcyclohex-1-ene

Identifiers
CAS Number	472-92-4
3D model (JSmol)	Interactive image
ChemSpider	4444642
PubChem CID	5281230
UNII	ZVE2M2UXOD
CompTox Dashboard (EPA)	DTXSID501315574
- InChI: InChI=1S/C40H56/c1-32(2)18-13-21-35(5)24-15-26-36(6)25-14-22-33(3)19-11- 12-20-34(4)23-16-27-37(7)29-30-39-38(8)28-17-31-40(39,9)10/h11-12,14-16, 18-20,22-30,39H,13,17,21,31H2,1-10H3/b12-11+,22-14+,23-16+,26-15+, 30-29+,33-19+,34-20+,35-24+,36-25+,37-27+/t39-/m0/s1 Key: WGIYGODPCLMGQH-GOXCNPTKSA-N
- SMILES: CC1=CCCC(C1C=CC(=CC=CC(=CC=CC=C(C)C=CC=C(C)C=CC=C(C)CCC=C(C)C)C)C)(C)C

Properties
Chemical formula	C_{40}H_{56}
Molar mass	536.873
- Except where otherwise noted, data are given for materials in their standard state (at 25 °C [77 °F], 100 kPa). Infobox references

δ-Carotene (delta-carotene) or ε,ψ-carotene is a form of carotene with an ε-ring at one end, and the other uncyclized, labelled ψ (psi). It is an intermediate synthesis product in some photosynthetic plants between lycopene and α-carotene (β,ε-carotene) or ε-carotene (ε,ε-carotene). δ-Carotene is fat soluble. Delta-carotene contains an alpha-ionone instead of a beta-ionone ring; this conversion is carried out by the gene Del which shifts the position of the double bond in the ring structure. The formation delta-carotene under the presence of the Del gene is sensitive to high temperatures.
