= Carotene epsilon-monooxygenase =

Identifiers
- EC no.: 1.14.99.45

Databases
- IntEnz: IntEnz view
- BRENDA: BRENDA entry
- ExPASy: NiceZyme view
- KEGG: KEGG entry
- MetaCyc: metabolic pathway
- PRIAM: profile
- PDB structures: RCSB PDB PDBe PDBsum
Search
- PMC: articles
- PubMed: articles
- NCBI: proteins

Carotene epsilon-monooxygenase (EC 1.14.99.45, CYP97C1, LUT1) is an enzyme with systematic name alpha-carotene:oxygen oxidoreductase (3-hydroxylating). This enzyme catalyses the following chemical reaction

alpha-carotene + O_{2} + AH_{2} $\rightleftharpoons$ alpha-cryptoxanthin + A + H_{2}O

Carotene epsilon-monooxygenase is a heme-thiolate protein (P450)..
