= Plastoglobulin =

Plastoglobulins is a family of proteins prominent found in lipid globules in plastids of flowering plants. It shows sequence similarities to the PAP/fibrillin family. PGL and similar proteins can be found in most algae, cyanobacteria and plants, but no other life forms; it suggests a role for PGL in oxygenic photosynthesis.

== Research ==
A group from the University of Maryland conducted research whereby they inactivated the genes (pgl1 and pgl2) encoding for plastoglobulin-like proteins in Synechocystis. The results show a decrease in the number of chlorophyll, as well as a lower photosystem I (PSI)/PSII ratio in the mutants. However, the concentration of carotenoid and myxoxanthophyll in each chlorophyll has increased. These mutants produced no observable change in growth rates under low light, but did grow slowing under moderate light. The concentration of the two PGL proteins (PGL1 and PGL2) in the wild-type increased under more intense light; this led to the conclusion that PGL plays a role in photo-oxidative damage repair.

== Structure and function ==
The sequence for Plastoglobulin-1 has been elucidated in Pisum sativum (garden pea); it was found to be synthesised as a 358 residue pro-peptide, containing a 47 residue transit peptide for localisation to the chloroplast; the transit peptide is cleaved to produce the mature plastoglobulin. Plastoglobulin are known to interact with each other to form a coat on lipid globules, that either recruits or maintain receptors for attachment to the thylakoid membrane, or for transport of lipids across the thylakoid membrane.
