= Irone =

Chemical compound

Chemical structures of (−)-cis-γ-irone (top) and (−)-cis-α-irone

Irones are a group of methylionone odorants used in perfumery, derived from iris oil, e.g. orris root. The most commercially important of these are:

- (−)-cis-γ-irone, and
- (−)-cis-α-irone

Irones form through slow oxidation of triterpenoids in dried rhizomes of the iris species, Iris pallida. Irones typically have a sweet floral, iris, woody, ionone, odor. Metabolic engineering has been used as a means of producing cis-α-irone.

== See also ==
- Ionone
