= Carotene =

Class of compounds

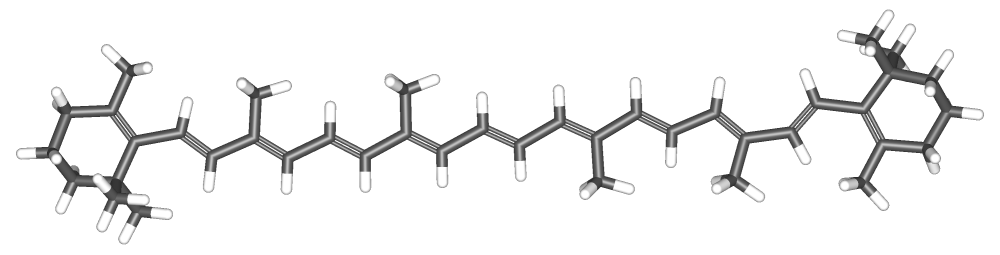
A 3-dimensional stick diagram of β-carotene

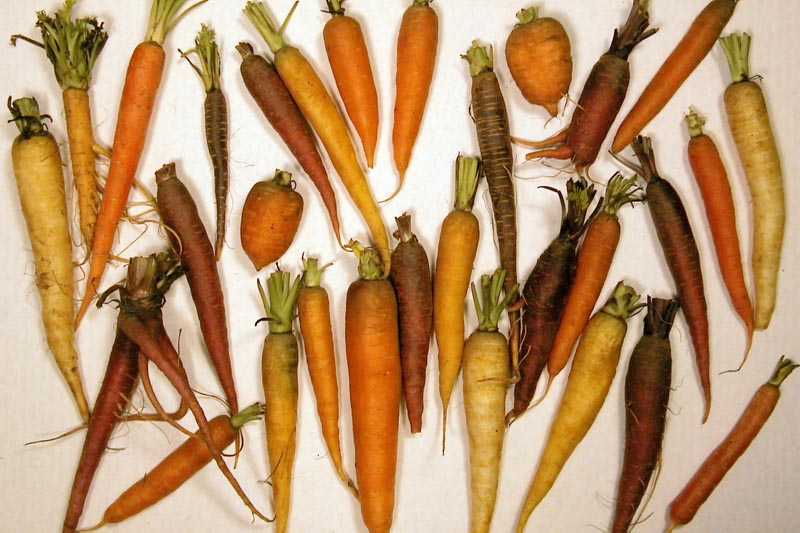
Carotene is responsible for the orange colour of carrots and the colours of many other fruits and vegetables and even some animals.

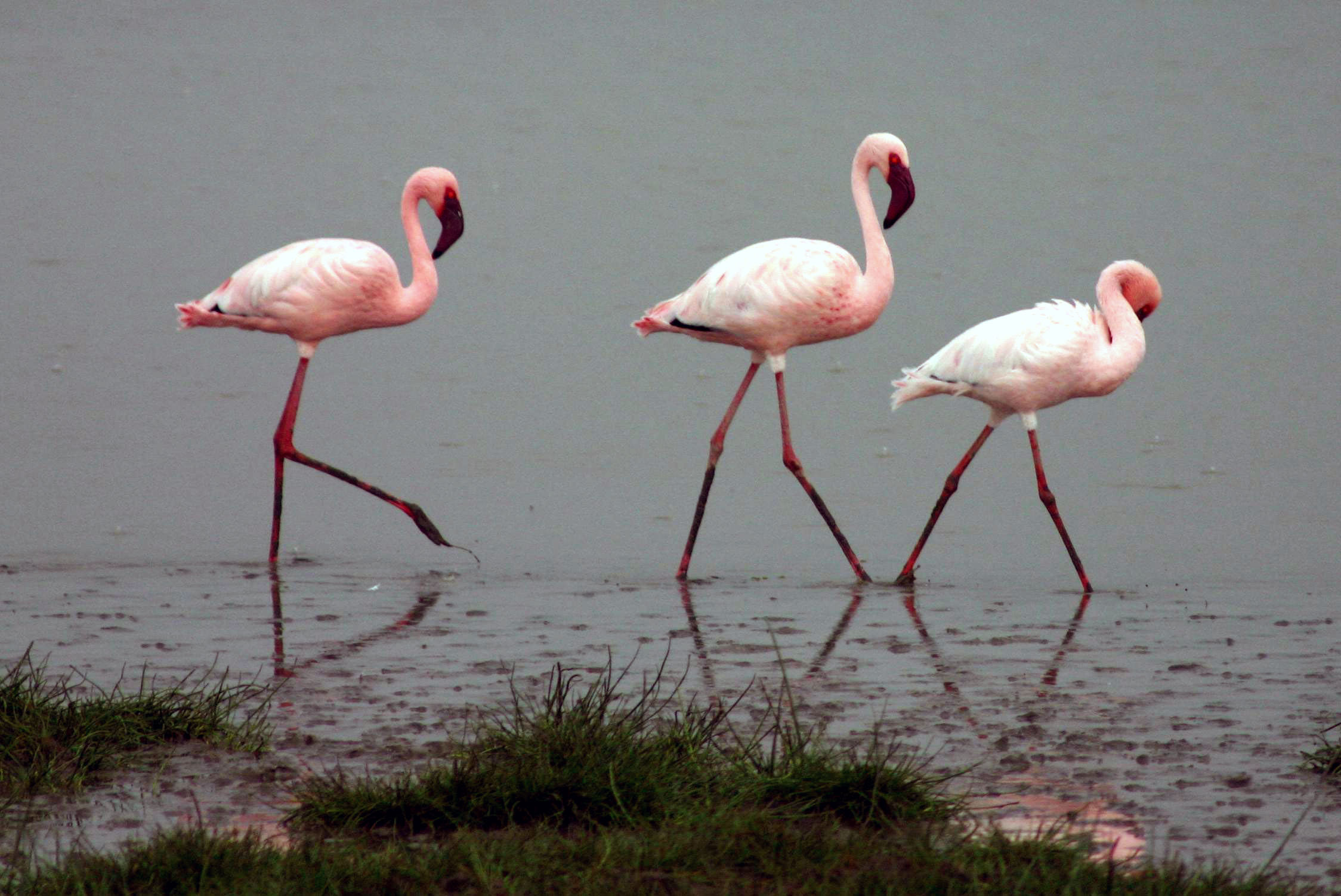
Lesser flamingos in the Ngorongoro Crater, Tanzania. The pink colour of wild flamingos is due to astaxanthin (a carotenoid) they absorb from their diet of brine shrimp. If fed a carotene-free diet they become white.

The term carotene (also carotin, from the Latin carota, "carrot") is used for many related unsaturated hydrocarbon substances having the formula C_{40}H_{x}, which are synthesized by plants but in general cannot be made by animals (with the exception of some aphids and spider mites which acquired the synthesizing genes from fungi). Carotenes are photosynthetic pigments important for photosynthesis.

Carotenes contain no oxygen atoms. They absorb ultraviolet, violet, and blue light, and scatter orange or red light, and yellow light (in low concentrations).

Carotenes are responsible for the orange colour of the carrot, after which this class of chemicals is named, and for the colours of many other fruits, vegetables and fungi (for example, sweet potatoes, chanterelle and orange cantaloupe melon). Carotenes are also responsible for the orange (but not all of the yellow) colours in dry foliage. They also (in lower concentrations) impart the yellow coloration to milk-fat and butter. Omnivorous animal species which are relatively poor converters of coloured dietary carotenoids to colourless retinoids, such as humans and chickens, have yellow-coloured body fat, as a result of the carotenoid retention from the vegetable portion of their diet.

Carotenes contribute to photosynthesis by transmitting the light energy they absorb to chlorophyll. They also protect plant tissues by helping to absorb the energy from singlet oxygen, an excited form of the oxygen molecule O_{2} which is formed during photosynthesis.

β-Carotene is composed of two retinyl groups, and is broken down in the mucosa of the human small intestine by β-carotene 15,15'-monooxygenase to retinal, a form of vitamin A. β-Carotene can be stored in the liver and body fat and converted to retinal as needed, thus making it a form of vitamin A for humans and some other mammals. The carotenes α-carotene and γ-carotene, due to their single retinyl group (β-ionone ring), also have some vitamin A activity (though less than β-carotene), as does the xanthophyll carotenoid β-cryptoxanthin. All other carotenoids, including lycopene, have no beta-ring and thus no vitamin A activity (although they may have antioxidant activity and thus biological activity in other ways).

Animal species differ greatly in their ability to convert retinyl (beta-ionone) containing carotenoids to retinals. Carnivores in general are poor converters of dietary ionone-containing carotenoids. Pure carnivores such as ferrets lack β-carotene 15,15'-monooxygenase and cannot convert any carotenoids to retinals at all (resulting in carotenes not being a form of vitamin A for this species); while cats can convert a trace of β-carotene to retinol, although the amount is totally insufficient for meeting their daily retinol needs.

== Molecular structure ==
Carotenes are polyunsaturated hydrocarbons containing 40 carbon atoms per molecule, variable numbers of hydrogen atoms, and no other elements. Some carotenes are terminated by rings, on one or both ends of the molecule. All are coloured, due to the presence of conjugated double bonds. Carotenes are tetraterpenes, meaning that they are derived from eight 5-carbon isoprene units (or four 10-carbon terpene units).

Carotenes are found in plants in two primary forms designated by characters from the Greek alphabet: alpha-carotene (α-carotene) and beta-carotene (β-carotene). Gamma-, delta-, epsilon-, and zeta-carotene (γ, δ, ε, and ζ-carotene) also exist. Since they are hydrocarbons, and therefore contain no oxygen, carotenes are fat-soluble and insoluble in water (in contrast with other carotenoids, the xanthophylls, which contain oxygen and thus are less chemically hydrophobic).

== History ==
The discovery of carotene from carrot juice is credited to Heinrich Wilhelm Ferdinand Wackenroder, a finding made during a search for antihelminthics, which he published in 1831. He obtained it in small ruby-red flakes soluble in ether, which when dissolved in fats gave "a beautiful yellow colour". William Christopher Zeise recognised its hydrocarbon nature in 1847, but his analyses gave him a composition of C_{5}H_{8}. It was Léon-Albert Arnaud in 1886 who confirmed its hydrocarbon nature and gave the formula C_{26}H_{38}, which is close to the theoretical composition of C_{40}H_{56}. Adolf Lieben in studies, also published in 1886, of the colouring matter in corpora lutea, first came across carotenoids in animal tissue, but did not recognise the nature of the pigment. Subsequently, Johann Ludwig Wilhelm Thudichum, in 1868–1869, after stereoscopic spectral examination, applied the term 'luteine' (lutein) to this class of yellow crystallizable substances found in animals, plants, and related biological materials. Richard Martin Willstätter, who gained the Nobel Prize in Chemistry in 1915, mainly for his work on chlorophyll, assigned the composition of C_{40}H_{56}, distinguishing it from the similar but oxygenated xanthophyll, C_{40}H_{56}O_{2}. With Heinrich Escher, in 1910, lycopene was isolated from tomatoes and shown to be an isomer of carotene. Later work by Escher also differentiated the 'luteal' pigments in egg yolk from that of the carotenes in cow corpus luteum.

== Dietary sources ==
The following foods contain carotenes in notable amounts:

- carrots
- wolfberries (goji)
- cantaloupe
- mangoes
- red bell pepper
- papaya
- spinach
- kale
- sweet potato
- tomato
- dandelion greens
- broccoli
- collard greens
- winter squash
- pumpkin
- cassava

Absorption from these foods is enhanced if eaten with fats, as carotenes are fat soluble, and if the food is cooked for a few minutes until the plant cell wall splits and the color is released into any liquid. 12 μg of dietary β-carotene supplies the equivalent of 1 μg of retinol, and 24 μg of α-carotene or β-cryptoxanthin provides the equivalent of 1 μg of retinol.

== Forms of carotene ==
α-carotene

β-carotene

γ-carotene

δ-carotene

The two primary isomers of carotene, α-carotene and β-carotene, differ in the position of a double bond (and thus a hydrogen) in the cyclic group at one end (the right end in the diagram at right).

β-Carotene is the more common form and can be found in yellow, orange, and green leafy fruits and vegetables. As a rule of thumb, the greater the intensity of the orange colour of the fruit or vegetable, the more β-carotene it contains.

== β-Carotene and physiology ==
=== β-Carotene and cancer ===
An article on the American Cancer Society says that The Cancer Research Campaign has called for warning labels on β-carotene supplements to caution smokers that such supplements may increase the risk of lung cancer.

The New England Journal of Medicine published an article in 1994 about a trial which examined the relationship between daily supplementation of β-carotene and vitamin E (α-tocopherol) and the incidence of lung cancer. The study was done using supplements and researchers were aware of the epidemiological correlation between carotenoid-rich fruits and vegetables and lower lung cancer rates. The research concluded that no reduction in lung cancer was found in the participants using these supplements, and furthermore, these supplements may, in fact, have harmful effects.

The Journal of the National Cancer Institute and The New England Journal of Medicine published articles in 1996 about a trial with a goal to determine if vitamin A (in the form of retinyl palmitate) and β-carotene (at about 30 mg/day, which is 10 times the Reference Daily Intake) supplements had any beneficial effects to prevent cancer. The results indicated an increased risk of lung and prostate cancers for the participants who consumed the β-carotene supplement and who had lung irritation from smoking or asbestos exposure, causing the trial to be stopped early.

A review of all randomized controlled trials in the scientific literature by the Cochrane Collaboration published in JAMA in 2007 found that synthetic β-carotene increased mortality by 1–8% (Relative Risk 1.05, 95% confidence interval 1.01–1.08). However, this meta-analysis included two large studies of smokers, so it is not clear that the results apply to the general population. The review only studied the influence of synthetic antioxidants and the results should not be translated to potential effects of fruits and vegetables.

=== β-Carotene and photosensitivity ===
Oral β-carotene is prescribed to people suffering from erythropoietic protoporphyria. It provides them some relief from photosensitivity.

=== Carotenemia ===
Carotenemia or hypercarotenemia is excess carotene, but unlike excess vitamin A, carotene is non-toxic. Although hypercarotenemia is not particularly dangerous, it can lead to an oranging of the skin (carotenodermia), but not the conjunctiva of eyes (thus easily distinguishing it visually from jaundice). It is most commonly associated with consumption of an abundance of carrots, but it also can be a medical sign of more dangerous conditions.

== Production ==
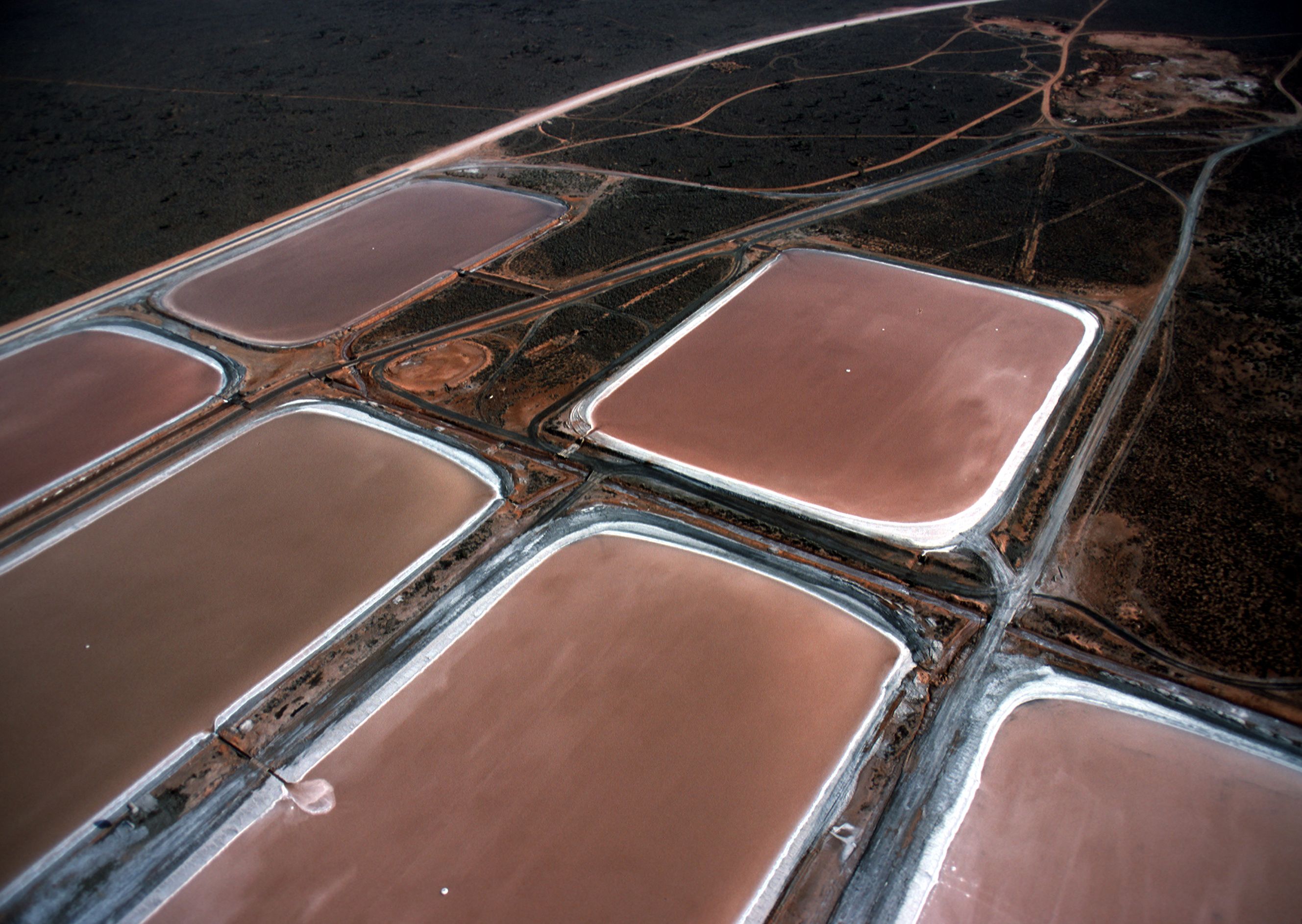
Algae farm ponds in Whyalla, South Australia, used to produce β-carotene

Carotenes are produced in a general manner for other terpenoids and terpenes, i.e. by coupling, cyclization, and oxygenation reactions of isoprene derivatives. Lycopene is the key precursor to carotenoids. It is formed by coupling of geranylgeranyl pyrophosphate and geranyllinally pyrophosphate.

Most of the world's synthetic supply of carotene comes from a manufacturing complex located in Freeport, Texas and owned by DSM. The other major supplier BASF also uses a chemical process to produce β-carotene. Together these suppliers account for about 85% of the β-carotene on the market. In Spain Vitatene produces natural β-carotene from fungus Blakeslea trispora, as does DSM but at much lower amount when compared to its synthetic β-carotene operation. In Australia, organic β-carotene is produced by Aquacarotene Limited from dried marine algae Dunaliella salina grown in harvesting ponds situated in Karratha, Western Australia. BASF Australia is also producing β-carotene from microalgae grown in two sites in Australia that are the world's largest algae farms. In Portugal, the industrial biotechnology company Biotrend is producing natural all-trans-β-carotene from a non-genetically modified bacteria of the genus Sphingomonas isolated from soil.

Carotenes are also found in palm oil, corn, and in the milk of dairy cows, causing cow's milk to be light yellow, depending on the feed of the cattle, and the amount of fat in the milk (high-fat milks, such as those produced by Guernsey cows, tend to be yellower because their fat content causes them to contain more carotene).

Carotenes are also found in some species of termites, where they apparently have been picked up from the diet of the insects.

=== Synthesis ===
There are currently two commonly used methods of total synthesis of β-carotene. The first was developed by BASF and is based on the Wittig reaction with Wittig himself as patent holder:

Carotene synthesis by Wittig

The second is a Grignard reaction, elaborated by Hoffman-La Roche from the original synthesis of Inhoffen et al. They are both symmetrical; the BASF synthesis is C20 + C20, and the Hoffman-La Roche synthesis is C19 + C2 + C19.

== Nomenclature ==
Carotenes are carotenoids containing no oxygen. Carotenoids containing some oxygen are known as xanthophylls.

The two ends of the β-carotene molecule are structurally identical, and are called β-rings. Specifically, the group of nine carbon atoms at each end form a β-ring.

The α-carotene molecule has a β-ring at one end; the other end is called an ε-ring. There is no such thing as an "α-ring".

These and similar names for the ends of the carotenoid molecules form the basis of a systematic naming scheme, according to which:

- α-carotene is β,ε-carotene;
- β-carotene is β,β-carotene;
- γ-carotene (with one β ring and one uncyclized end that is labelled psi) is β,ψ-carotene;
- δ-carotene (with one ε ring and one uncyclized end) is ε,ψ-carotene;
- ε-carotene is ε,ε-carotene
- lycopene is ψ,ψ-carotene

ζ-Carotene is the biosynthetic precursor of neurosporene, which is the precursor of lycopene, which, in turn, is the precursor of the carotenes α through ε.

== Food additive ==
Carotene is used to colour products such as juice, cakes, desserts, butter and margarine. It is approved for use as a food additive in the EU (listed as additive E160a) Australia and New Zealand (listed as 160a). Only beta-carotene is approved in the US.

== See also ==
- Antioxidant
