= Tea Rose (fragrance) =

1973 fragrance by The Perfumer's Workshop

Fragrance by The Perfumer's Workshop
- Category: Green Rose Soliflore
- Designed for: Women
- Top notes: Primarily rose and violet leaves
- Heart notes: Primarily rose
- Base notes: Primarily rose
- Released: 1973
- Label: The Perfumer's Workshop
- Perfumer(s): Léon Hardy / Annie Buzantian
- Flanker(s): Tea Rose Jasmin (1975); Tea Rose Amber (1999); Tea Rose Mesk (1999)
- Successor: Eau de Parfume Tea Rose (2014)

Tea Rose is a green rose soliflore fragrance that was released in 1973 by The Perfumer's Workshop. It was the first fragrance to use the scents of Bulgarian rose oil from iso-damascone.

== The "workshop" ==
The Perfumer's Workshop started with a single counter at Bloomingdale's in New York City, in February 1973. The workshop had 64 perfume oils, which had the tenacity of essential oils but were finished, oil-based products, plus fragrance materials like diluting solutions and fixatives. They would encourage customers to sample different perfume oils, to wear alone or in a blend created by the customer. These oils could be worn at full strength, or diluted into a cologne or eau de toilette strength.

Offering a line of single-note fragrances was not a completely novel idea; for example, in the 1930s Mary Chess had a set of floral fragrances sold in bottles that looked like chess pieces, including one called Tea Rose, and kits for blending custom perfumes were sold in the 1950s, with craft kits marketed to children through the 1960s.

== Founders ==
The Perfumer's Workshop was founded by Howard Molyneux and Donald G. Bachner.

Molyneux was related to the fashion designer Edward Molyneux. He was involved opening store counters in the company's first years, and was presented as an experienced perfumer who created the perfume oils, and he remained with the company as a director into the 1980s. In 1986, he launched a separate product called Perfixe, which increased perfume longevity.

Prior to The Perfumer's Workshop, Donald Bauchner attended the Wharton School and worked as a product manager for solid perfume pendants sold by Hazel Bishop before joining Marian Bialac, Inc. as president. He and his wife Gun Bäckström Bauchner soon became the face of the company. She came to the US from Sweden in 1970 when she was 19 years old, and briefly worked as a cartoonist and illustrator before meeting and marrying Donald.

== Fragrance ==
The signature smell of roses comes from trace compounds called damascones, which chemist Edouard Demole at Firmenich first identified in rose oil. Firmenich learned to synthesize it and in 1972 they engineered a new isomer of one of those compounds—iso-damascone, a rose ketone not found in nature—which perfumer Léon Hardy blended into an oil he code-named Tea Rose. The Perfumer's Workshop kept that code name for the perfume oil when it joined the other 63 oils on their department store counters.

The oil was very popular, but it did not mix well with an alcohol base. In 1975, Annie Buzantian at Firmenich refined the formula to have a natural smell in alcohol.

The fragrance has rose notes throughout:

Top notes
Primarily rose and violet leaves; also aldehydes, apricot, bergamot, chamomile, marigold, and orange flower
Middle notes
Primarily rose; also clove, jasmine, and narcissus
Base notes
Primarily rose; also balsam, musk, sandalwood, Tolu balsam, vanilla, and a woody violet accord

== Fragrance line extensions ==
- Tea Rose Jasmin (1975)
- Tea Rose Amber (1999)
- Tea Rose Mesk (1999)
- Eau de Parfume Tea Rose (2014)
