= Ionone =

Group of isomers

Ionones
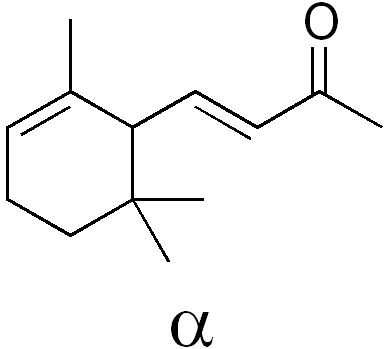

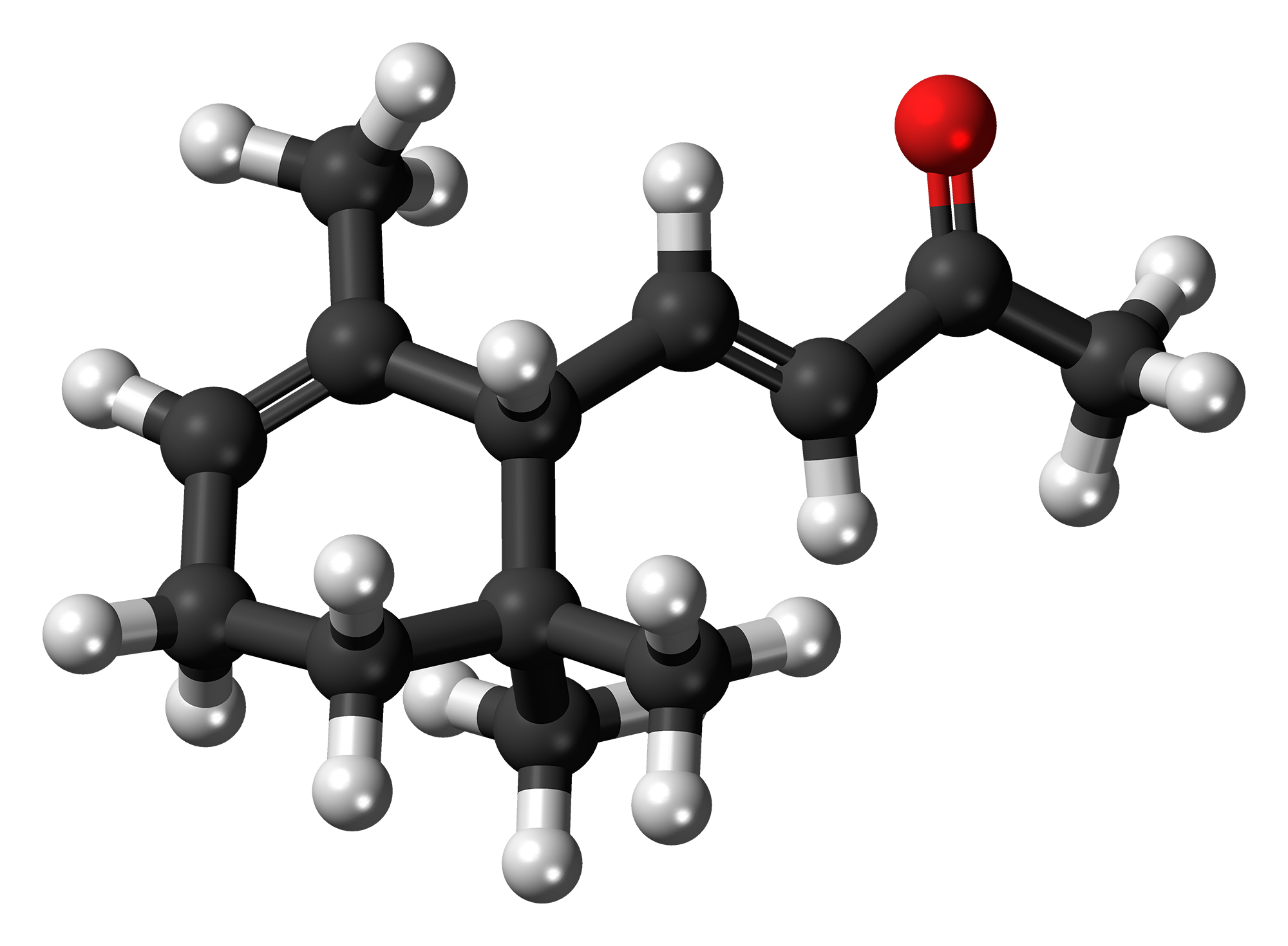
alpha-ionone
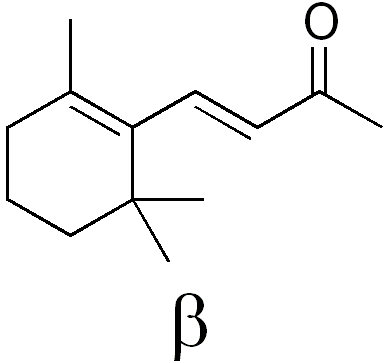

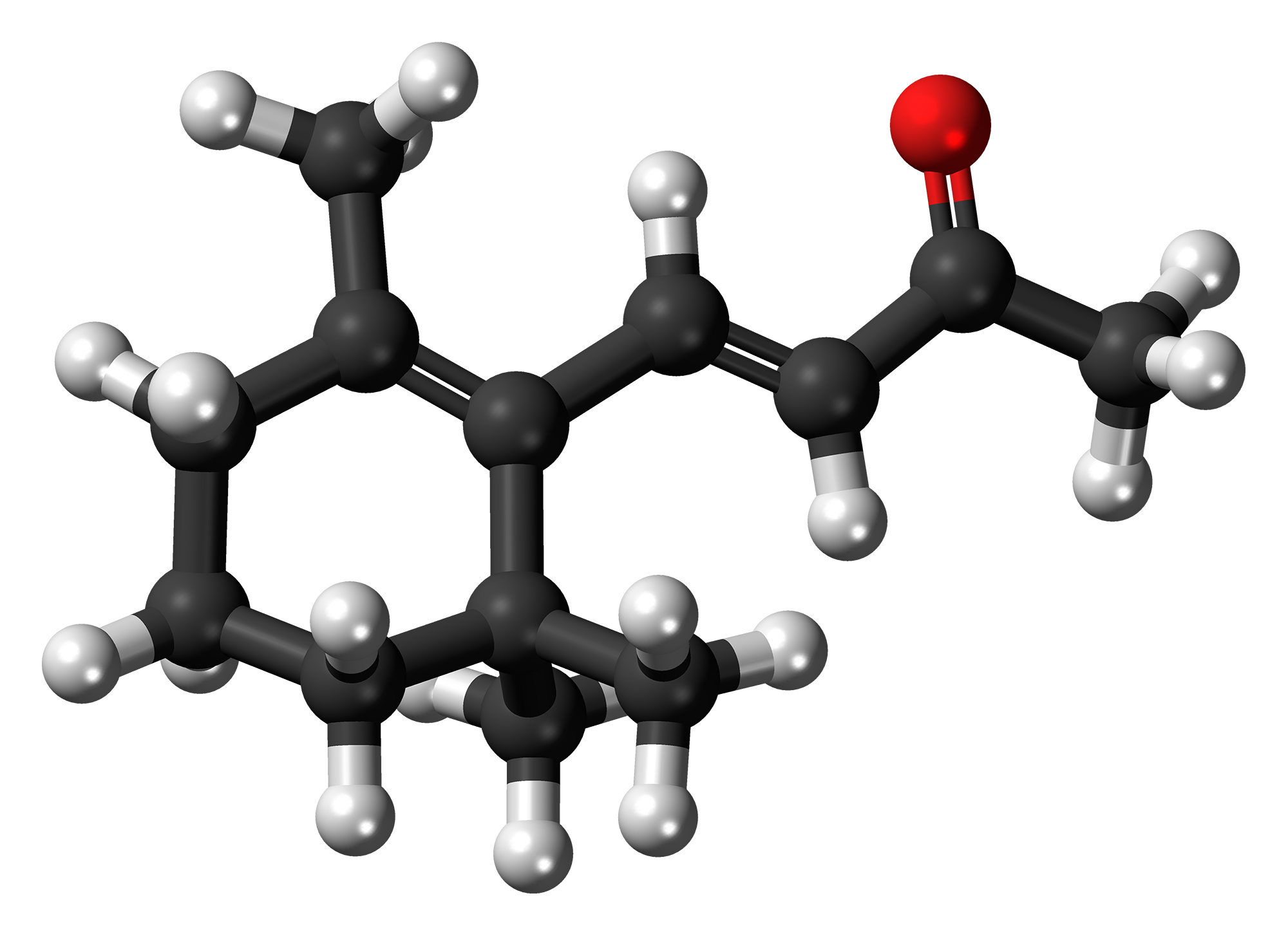
Ball-and-stick model of the beta-ionone molecule
beta-ionone
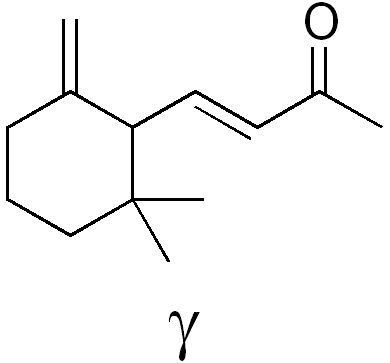

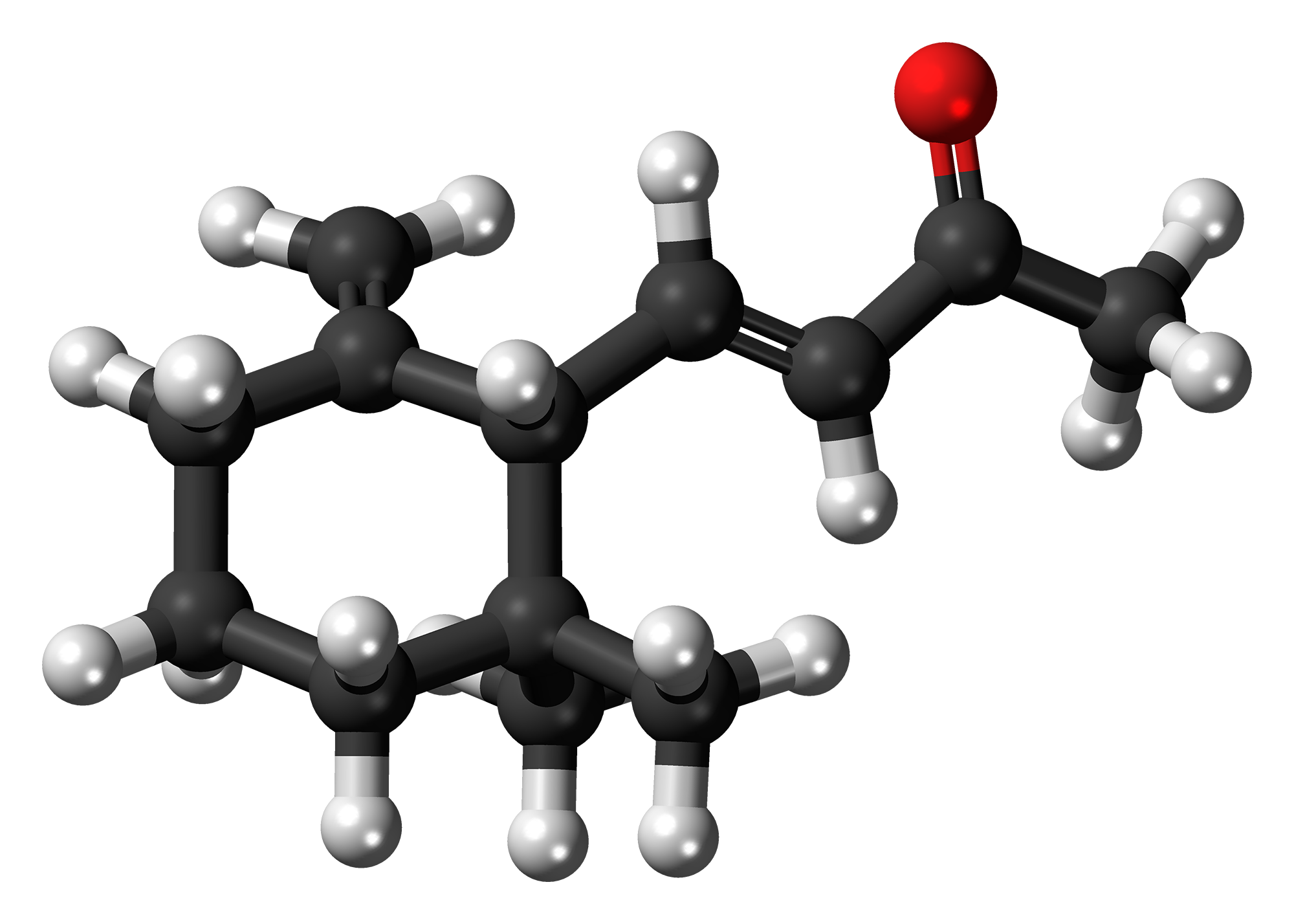
gamma-ionone

Names
- IUPAC names α: (3E)-4-(2,6,6-Trimethylcyclohex-2-en-1-yl)but-3-en-2-one β: (3E)-4-(2,6,6-Trimethylcyclohex-1-en-1-yl)but-3-en-2-one γ: (3E)-4-(2,2-Dimethyl-6-methylenecyclohexyl)but-3-en-2-one
- Other names Cyclocitrylideneacetone, irisone, jonon

Identifiers
CAS Number	127-41-3 α; 79-77-6 β; 79-76-5 γ
3D model (JSmol)	Interactive image
ChEBI	CHEBI:49250
ChemSpider	4516050
PubChem CID	5363741
UNII	QP734LIN1K
- InChI: InChI=1S/C13H20O/c1-10-6-5-9-13(3,4)12(10)8-7-11(2)14/h7-8,12H,1,5-6,9H2,2-4H3/b8-7+ Key: SFEOKXHPFMOVRM-BQYQJAHWSA-N; InChI=1/C13H20O/c1-10-6-5-9-13(3,4)12(10)8-7-11(2)14/h7-8,12H,1,5-6,9H2,2-4H3/b8-7+ Key: SFEOKXHPFMOVRM-BQYQJAHWBW
- SMILES: O=C(\C=C\C1\C(=C)CCCC1(C)C)C

Properties
Chemical formula	C_{13}H_{20}O
Molar mass	192.30 g/mol
Density	α: 0.933 g/cm^{3} β: 0.945 g/cm^{3}
Melting point	β: −49 °C (−56 °F; 224 K)
Boiling point	β: 126 to 128 °C (259 to 262 °F; 399 to 401 K) at 12 mmHg
- Except where otherwise noted, data are given for materials in their standard state (at 25 °C [77 °F], 100 kPa). verify (what is ?) Infobox references

The ionones, from greek ἴον ion "violet", are a series of closely related chemical substances that are part of a group of compounds known as rose ketones, which also includes damascones and damascenones. Ionones are aroma compounds found in a variety of essential oils, including rose oil. β-Ionone is a significant contributor to the aroma of roses, despite its relatively low concentration, and is an important fragrance chemical used in perfumery. The ionones are derived from the degradation of carotenoids.

The combination of α-ionone and β-ionone is characteristic of the scent of violets and used with other components in perfumery and flavouring to recreate their scent.

The carotenes α-carotene, β-carotene, γ-carotene, and the xanthophyll β-cryptoxanthin, can all be metabolized to β-ionone, and thus have vitamin A activity because they can be converted by plant-eating animals to retinol and retinal. Carotenoids that do not contain the β-ionone moiety cannot be converted to retinol, and thus have no vitamin A activity.

Ionones are classified as apocarotenoids (specifically C₁₃-norisoprenoids), formed by oxidative cleavage of larger carotenoid molecules, which places them within the broader family of terpenoid-derived natural products. This structural origin explains both their occurrence in plants and their characteristic fragrance properties.

== Biosynthesis ==
Carotenoids are the precursors of important fragrance compounds in several flowers. For example, a 2010 study of ionones in Osmanthus fragrans Lour. var. aurantiacus determined its essential oil contained the highest diversity of carotenoid-derived volatiles among the flowering plants investigated. A cDNA encoding a carotenoid cleavage enzyme, OfCCD1, was identified from transcripts isolated from flowers of O. fragrans Lour. The recombinant enzymes cleaved carotenes to produce α-ionone and β-ionone in in vitro assays.

The same study also discovered that carotenoid content, volatile emissions, and OfCCD1 transcript levels are subject to photorhythmic changes, and principally increased during daylight hours. At the times when OfCCD1 transcript levels reached their maxima, the carotenoid content remained low or slightly decreased. The emission of ionones was also higher during the day; however, emissions decreased at a lower rate than the transcript levels. Moreover, carotenoid content increased from the first to the second day, whereas the volatile release decreased, and the OfCCD1 transcript levels displayed steady-state oscillations, suggesting that the substrate availability in the cellular compartments is changing or other regulatory factors are involved in volatile norisoprenoid formation. The formation of ionones proceeds by a process mediated by the carotenoid dioxygenases.

Biosynthesis of the ionones

== Organic synthesis ==
Ionone can be synthesised from citral and acetone with calcium oxide as a basic heterogeneous catalyst and serves as an example of an aldol condensation followed by a rearrangement reaction.

The nucleophilic addition of the carbanion 3 of acetone 1 to the carbonyl group on citral 4 is base catalysed. The aldol condensation product 5 eliminates water through the enolate ion 6 to form pseudoionone 7.

The reaction proceeds by acid catalysis where the double bond in 7 opens to form the carbocation 8. A rearrangement reaction of the carbocation follows with ring closure to 9. Finally a hydrogen atom can be abstracted from 9 by an acceptor molecule (Y) to form either 10 (extended conjugated system) or 11.

== Genetic differences in odor perception ==
A single-nucleotide polymorphism in the OR5A1 receptor (rs6591536) causes very significant differences in the odor perception of beta-ionone, both in sensitivity and also in subjective quality. Individuals who contain at least one G allele are sensitive to beta-ionone and perceive a pleasant floral scent, while individuals who are homozygous AA are ~100 times less sensitive and at higher concentrations perceive a pungent sour/vinegar odor instead.

== See also ==
- Irones, a group of related chemical compounds
- α-Isomethyl ionone, a type of ionone
