= OR5A1 =

Protein-coding gene in the species Homo sapiens

Identifiers
- Aliases: OR5A1, OR11-249, OR5A1P, OST181, olfactory receptor family 5 subfamily A member 1
- External IDs: MGI: 2153205; GeneCards: OR5A1

Gene location (Human)
Chr.	Chromosome 11 (human)
Band	11q12.1	Start	59,436,469 bp
Band	11q12.1	End	59,451,380 bp

Gene location (Mouse)
Chr.	Chromosome 19 (mouse)
Band	19|19 A	Start	12,095,360 bp
Band	19|19 A	End	12,100,567 bp
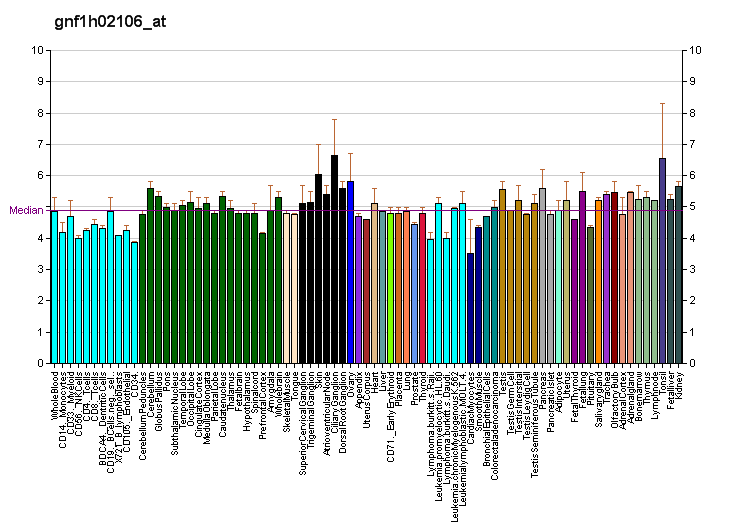
RNA expression pattern
Bgee	Human / Mouse (ortholog); Top expressed in: testicle / Top expressed in: respiratory epithelium; nasal epithelium; peripheral nervous system; olfactory epithelium; embryo; blastocyst; More reference expression data
BioGPS	More reference expression data
Gene ontology
Molecular function	G protein-coupled receptor activity; odorant binding; olfactory receptor activity; signal transducer activity
Cellular component	integral component of membrane; plasma membrane; membrane
Biological process	sensory perception of smell; signal transduction; response to stimulus; detection of chemical stimulus involved in sensory perception of smell; G protein-coupled receptor signaling pathway
Sources:Amigo / QuickGO
Orthologs
Databases	NCBI: entry; OMA: entry
Species	Human	Mouse
Entrez	219982	258677
Ensembl	ENSG00000172320	ENSMUSG00000067522
UniProt	Q8NGJ0	Q8VFV2
RefSeq (mRNA)	NM_001004728	NM_146682
RefSeq (protein)	NP_001004728	NP_666893
Location (UCSC)	Chr 11: 59.44 – 59.45 Mb	Chr 19: 12.1 – 12.1 Mb
PubMed search
- Wikidata
View/Edit Human	View/Edit Mouse

Olfactory receptor 5A1 is a protein that in humans is encoded by the OR5A1 gene.

Olfactory receptors interact with odorant molecules in the nose, to initiate a neuronal response that triggers the perception of a smell. The olfactory receptor proteins are members of a large family of G-protein-coupled receptors (GPCR) arising from single coding-exon genes. Olfactory receptors share a 7-transmembrane domain structure with many neurotransmitter and hormone receptors and are responsible for the recognition and G protein-mediated transduction of odorant signals. The olfactory receptor gene family is the largest in the genome. The nomenclature assigned to the olfactory receptor genes and proteins for this organism is independent of other organisms.

== Genetic differences ==
A single-nucleotide polymorphism in the OR5A1 receptor (rs6591536) causes very significant differences in the odor perception of beta-ionone, both in sensitivity and also in subjective quality. Individuals who contain at least one G allele are sensitive to beta-ionone and perceive a pleasant floral scent, while individuals who are homozygous AA are ~100 times less sensitive and at higher concentrations perceive a pungent sour/vinegar odor instead.

== See also ==
- Olfactory receptor
