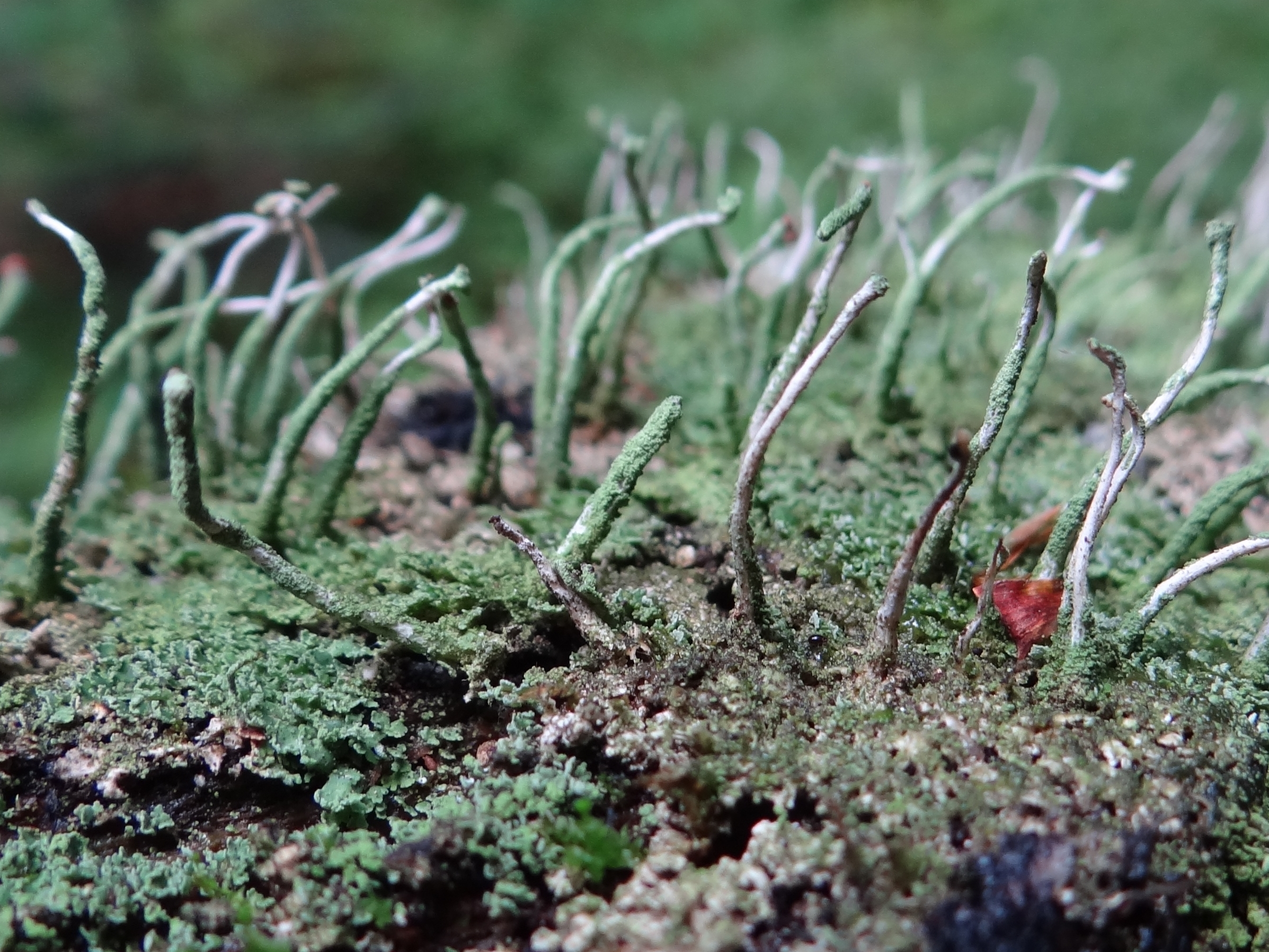

Scientific classification
- Domain: Eukaryota
- Kingdom: Fungi
- Division: Ascomycota
- Class: Lecanoromycetes
- Order: Lecanorales
- Family: Cladoniaceae
- Genus: Cladonia
- Species: C. glauca

Binomial name
- Cladonia glauca Flörke (1828)

Synonyms
- Cladonia cenotea subsp. glauca (Flörke) Vain. (1887); Cladonia cenotea var. glauca (Flörke) Leight.; Cladonia fimbriata f. glauca (Flörke) H.Olivier (1882)

= Cladonia glauca =

Species of lichen

Cladonia glauca or the glaucous cup lichen is a species of fruticose, cup lichen in the family Cladoniaceae. Found in Europe, it was formally described as a new species in 1828 by German botanist Heinrich Gustav Flörke. The nematodes Aphelenchoides lichenicola and Ottolenchus cabi feed on this lichen.

== See also ==
- List of Cladonia species
