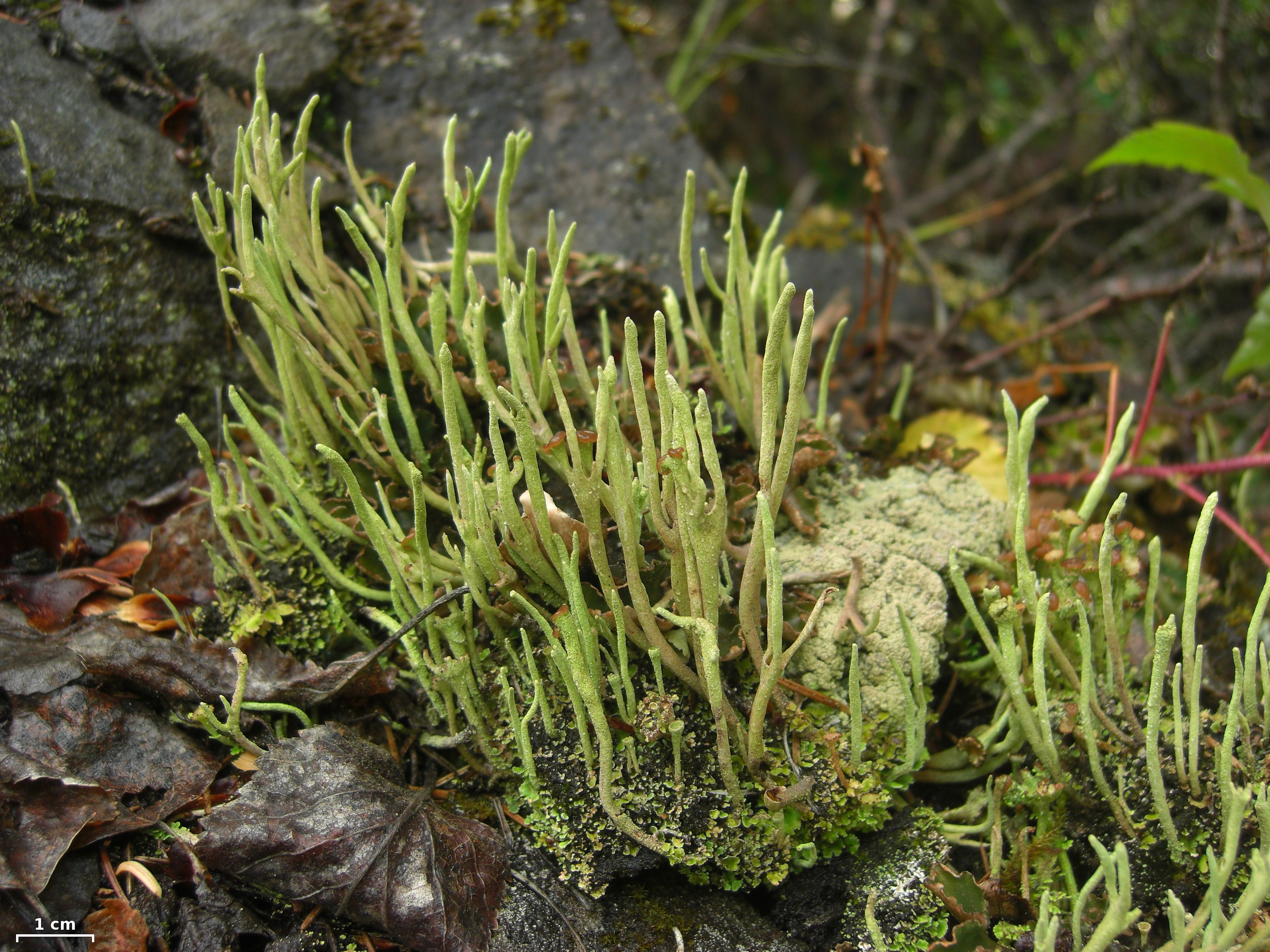

Scientific classification
- Kingdom: Fungi
- Division: Ascomycota
- Class: Lecanoromycetes
- Order: Lecanorales
- Family: Cladoniaceae
- Genus: Cladonia
- Species: C. subulata

Binomial name
- Cladonia subulata (L.) Weber ex F.H.Wigg. (1780)

Synonyms
- Lichen subulatus L. (1753)

= Cladonia subulata =

Species of lichen-forming fungus

Cladonia subulata is a species of fruticose, cup lichen in the family Cladoniaceae. It was first described as a new species by the Swedish taxonomist Carl Linnaeus in 1753. It was transferred to the genus Cladonia by Friedrich Heinrich Wiggers in 1780. In North America, the lichen is colloquially known as the antlered powderhorn or antlered cup lichen.

In Nepal, Cladonia subulata has been reported from 2,200 to 2,700 m elevation in a compilation of published records.

== See also ==
- List of lichens named by Carl Linnaeus
