= Damascone =

beta-Damascone
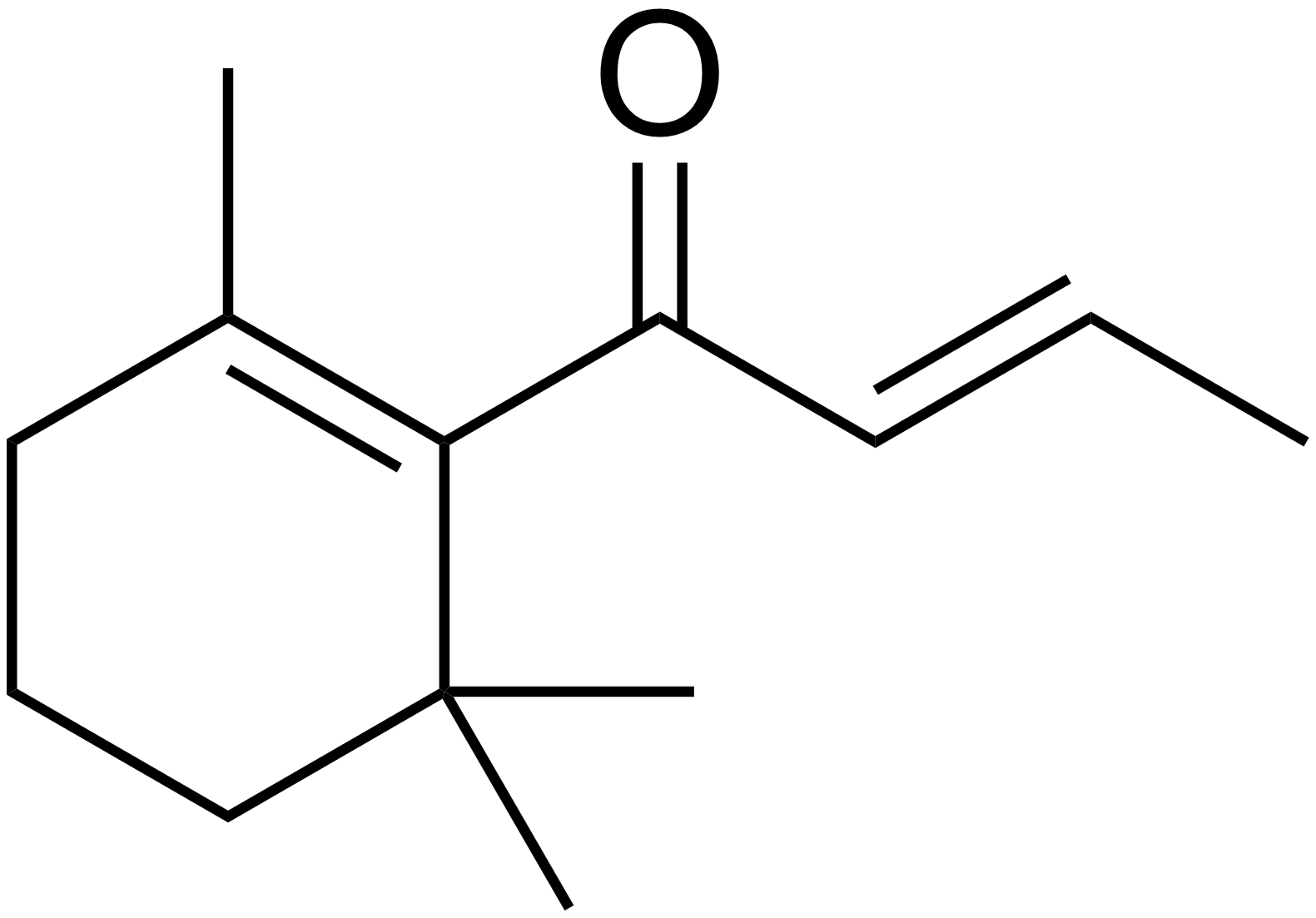
- β-Damascone

Names
- IUPAC name (E)-1-(2,6,6-Trimethyl-1-cyclohexenyl)but-2-en-1-one
- Other names Rose ketones

Identifiers
CAS Number	43052-87-5 (α); 23726-91-2 (β); 35087-49-1 (γ); 57378-68-4 (δ); 57350-34-2 (ε)
3D model (JSmol)	Interactive image
ChemSpider	4524302
ECHA InfoCard	100.041.660
EC Number	245-842-1
PubChem CID	5374527
UNII	I75J0X33Q6
CompTox Dashboard (EPA)	DTXSID7051890
- InChI: InChI=1S/C13H20O/c1-5-7-11(14)12-10(2)8-6-9-13(12,3)4/h5,7H,6,8-9H2,1-4H3/b7-5+ Key: BGTBFNDXYDYBEY-FNORWQNLSA-N; InChI=1/C13H20O/c1-5-7-11(14)12-10(2)8-6-9-13(12,3)4/h5,7H,6,8-9H2,1-4H3/b7-5+ Key: BGTBFNDXYDYBEY-FNORWQNLBE
- SMILES: O=C(/C1=C(/CCCC1(C)C)C)/C=C/C

Properties
Chemical formula	C_{13}H_{20}O
Molar mass	192.30 g/mol
Density	0.934 g/mL

Hazards
- GHS labelling
Pictograms	(GHS07: Exclamation mark) (GHS09: Environmental hazard)
Signal word	Warning
Hazard statements	H315, H317, H411
Precautionary statements	P261, P264, P272, P273, P280, P302+P352, P321, P332+P313, P333+P313, P362, P363, P391, P501
- Except where otherwise noted, data are given for materials in their standard state (at 25 °C [77 °F], 100 kPa). verify (what is ?) Infobox references

alpha-Damascone

Names
- IUPAC name (E)-1-(2,6,6-trimethyl-1-cyclohex-2-enyl)but-2-en-1-one
- Other names Rose ketones

Identifiers
CAS Number	24720-09-0
3D model (JSmol)	Interactive image
Beilstein Reference	2208707
ChEBI	CHEBI:53220
ChemSpider	4518000
ECHA InfoCard	100.041.660
EC Number	246-430-4 correct ECHA infocard 100.042.195
PubChem CID	5366077
CompTox Dashboard (EPA)	DTXSID8051912
- InChI: InChI=1S/C13H20O/c1-5-7-11(14)12-10(2)8-6-9-13(12,3)4/h5,7-8,12H,6,9H2,1-4H3/b7-5+ Key: CRIGTVCBMUKRSL-FNORWQNLSA-N
- SMILES: C/C=C/C(=O)C1C(=CCCC1(C)C)C

Properties
Chemical formula	C_{13}H_{20}O
Molar mass	192.302 g·mol^{−1}

Hazards
- GHS labelling
Pictograms	(GHS07: Exclamation mark) (GHS09: Environmental hazard)
Signal word	Warning
Hazard statements	H302, H317, H411
Precautionary statements	P261, P264, P270, P272, P273, P280, P301+P312, P302+P352, P321, P330, P333+P313, P363, P391, P501
- Except where otherwise noted, data are given for materials in their standard state (at 25 °C [77 °F], 100 kPa). verify (what is ?) Infobox references

Damascones are a series of closely related chemical compounds that are components of a variety of essential oils. The damascones belong to a family of chemicals known as rose ketones, which also includes damascenones and ionones. beta-Damascone is a contributor to the aroma of roses, despite its relatively low concentration, and is an important fragrance chemical used in perfumery.

The odour strength of all the damascones are high. The aroma of α-damascone is described as "sweet, floral, metallic, fruity, apple, spicy, plum, minty, woody, green, berry", β-damascone is described as "fruity, floral, black currant, plum, rose, honey, tobacco", γ-damascone is described as "fruity, floral, rose, green, cooked apple, plum, thujonic, tobacco", and δ-damascone is described as "fruity, sweet, rose, natural, petal, black currant bud, tobacco, woody, minty, brown, herbal".

Notable fragrances that use damascone are The Perfumer's Workshop Tea Rose (1973), Dior Poison (1985), and Guerlain Nahema (1979).

The damascones are derived from the degradation of carotenoids.

== See also ==
- Rose oil
