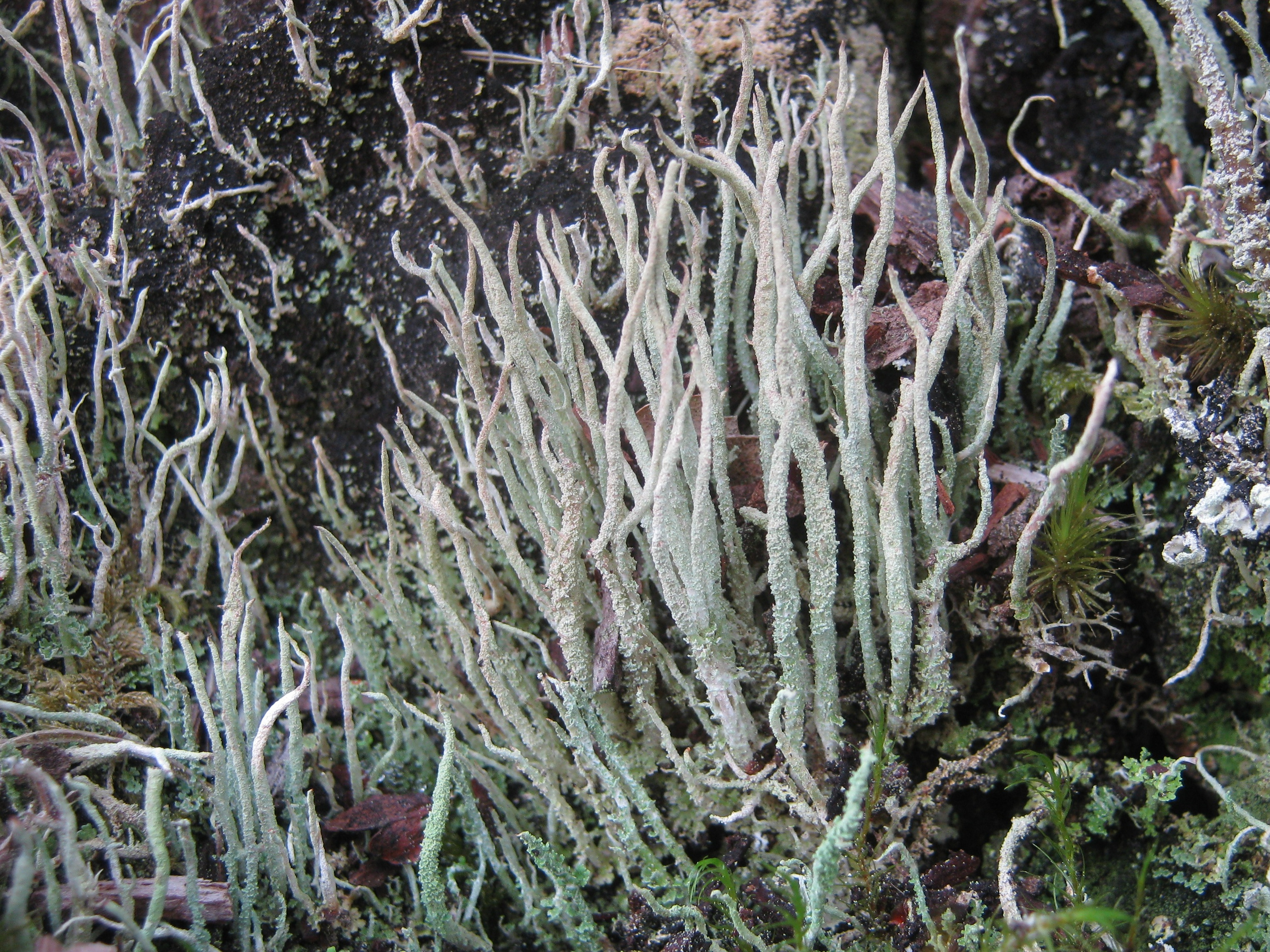

Conservation status
- Secure (NatureServe)

Scientific classification
- Kingdom: Fungi
- Division: Ascomycota
- Class: Lecanoromycetes
- Order: Lecanorales
- Family: Cladoniaceae
- Genus: Cladonia
- Species: C. cornuta

Binomial name
- Cladonia cornuta (L.) Hoffm. (1791)

Synonyms
- Lichen cornutus L. (1753)

= Cladonia cornuta =

Species of lichen

Cladonia cornuta or the bighorn cup lichen is a species of fruticose, cup lichen in the family Cladoniaceae. It was first described as a new species by Swedish lichenologist Carl Linnaeus in his seminal 1753 work Species Plantarum. German biologist Georg Franz Hoffmann transferred it to the genus Cladonia in 1791. The lichen has a distribution that is circumpolar, boreal, and arctic. It has also been recorded from the Southern Hemisphere.

In North America, Cladonia cornuta is colloquially known as the bighorn Cladonia.

== See also ==
- List of Cladonia species
- List of lichens named by Carl Linnaeus
