= Myxoxanthophyll =

Names
- IUPAC name (3S,4R,5S)-2-[(4E,6E,8E,10E,12E,14E,16E,18E,20E,22E,24E)-2-hydroxy-25-(4-hydroxy-2,6,6-trimethylcyclohexen-1-yl)-2,6,10,14,19,23-hexamethylpentacosa-4,6,8,10,12,14,16,18,20,22,24-undecaen-3-yl]oxy-6-methyloxane-3,4,5-triol
- Other names Myxoxanthophyll, myxol-2' fucoside

Identifiers
CAS Number	863126-98-1
3D model (JSmol)	Interactive image
PubChem CID	44237205
UNII	2D9J09M91C
- InChI: InChI=MUCOHWBULSBLLZ-GVZUTNEGSA-N
- SMILES: C/C(=C/C=C/C(C)=C/C=C/C=C(C)/C=C/C=C(C)/C=C/C=C(C)/C=C/[C@@H](O[C@@H]1O[C@@H](C)[C@@H](O)[C@@H](O)[C@@H]1O)C(C)(C)O)/C=C/C2=C(C)C[C@@H](O)CC2(C)C

Properties
Chemical formula	C_{46}H_{66}O_{7}
Molar mass	731.012 g/mol
- Except where otherwise noted, data are given for materials in their standard state (at 25 °C [77 °F], 100 kPa). Infobox references

Myxoxanthophyll is a carotenoid glycoside pigment present (usually as rhamnosides) in the photosynthetic apparatus of cyanobacteria. It is named after the word "Myxophyceae", a former term for cyanobacteria. As a monocyclic xanthophyll, it has a yellowish color. It is required for normal cell wall structure and thylakoid organization in the cyanobacterium Synechocystis. The pigment is unusual because it is glycosylated on the 2'-OH rather than the 1'-OH position of the molecule. Myxoxanthophyll was first isolated from Oscillatoria rubenscens in 1936.

== Synthesis ==
The bright red pigment lycopene is the acyclic precursor of all carotenoids in cyanobacteria. In myxoxanthophyll synthesis, lycopene is enzymatically converted to 1-hydroxylycoprene, then to intermediates 1'-hydroxy-y-carotene, plectaniaxanthin, and myxol. Finally, the hydroxyl group in myxol is glycosylated at the 2' position to form myxoxanthophyll.
