= Γ-Carotene =

γ-Carotene

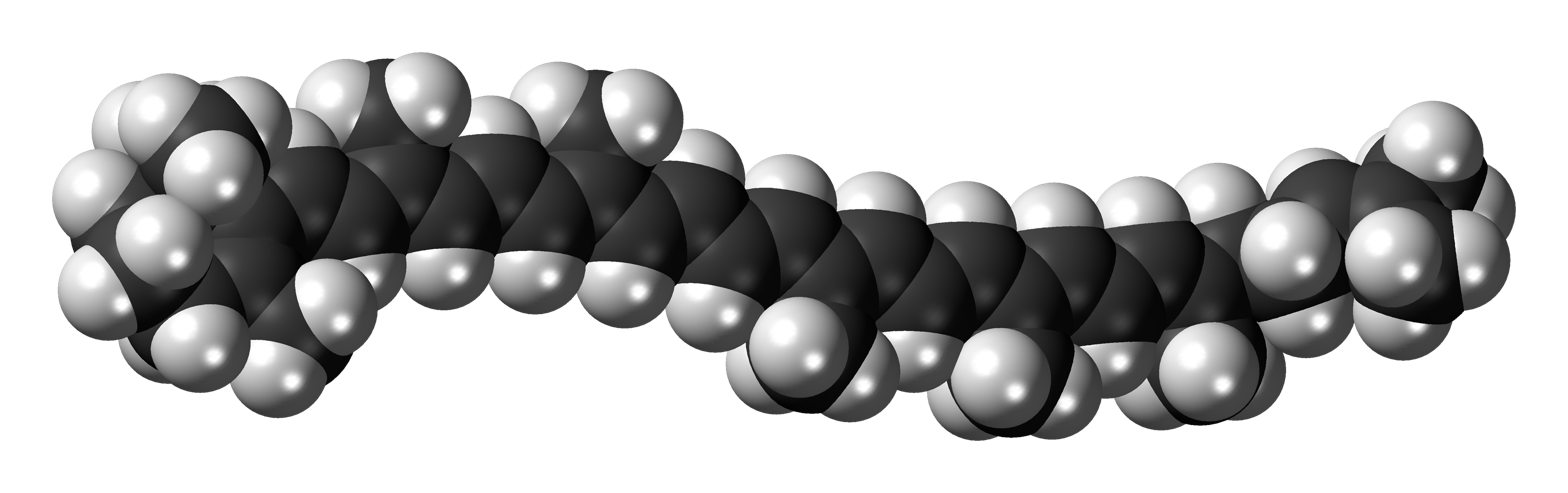

Names
- IUPAC name β,ψ-Carotene
- Systematic IUPAC name 2-[(1E,3E,5E,7E,9E,11E,13E,15E,17E,19E)-3,7,12,16,20,24-Hexamethylpentacosa-1,3,5,7,9,11,13,15,17,19,23-undecaen-1-yl]-1,3,3-trimethylcyclohex-1-ene

Identifiers
CAS Number	472-93-5
3D model (JSmol)	Interactive image
ChEBI	CHEBI:27740
ChemSpider	4444349
PubChem CID	5280791
UNII	DH369M0SOE
CompTox Dashboard (EPA)	DTXSID70897429
- InChI: InChI=1S/C40H56/c1-32(2)18-13-21-35(5)24-15-26-36(6)25-14-22-33(3)19-11-12-20-34(4)23-16-27-37(7)29-30-39-38(8)28-17-31-40(39,9)10/h11-12,14-16,18-20,22-27,29-30H,13,17,21,28,31H2,1-10H3/b12-11+,22-14+,23-16+,26-15+,30-29+,33-19+,34-20+,35-24+,36-25+,37-27+ Key: HRQKOYFGHJYEFS-BXOLYSJBSA-N; InChI=1/C40H56/c1-32(2)18-13-21-35(5)24-15-26-36(6)25-14-22-33(3)19-11-12-20-34(4)23-16-27-37(7)29-30-39-38(8)28-17-31-40(39,9)10/h11-12,14-16,18-20,22-27,29-30H,13,17,21,28,31H2,1-10H3/b12-11+,22-14+,23-16+,26-15+,30-29+,33-19+,34-20+,35-24+,36-25+,37-27+ Key: HRQKOYFGHJYEFS-BXOLYSJBBV
- SMILES: C(/C1=C(/CCCC1(C)C)C)=C\C(=C\C=C\C(=C\C=C\C=C(\C=C\C=C(\C=C\C=C(/C)CC\C=C(/C)C)C)C)C)C

Properties
Chemical formula	C_{40}H_{56}
Molar mass	536.888 g·mol^{−1}
Melting point	160 to 162 °C (320 to 324 °F; 433 to 435 K)
- Except where otherwise noted, data are given for materials in their standard state (at 25 °C [77 °F], 100 kPa). Infobox references

γ-Carotene (gamma-carotene) is a carotenoid, and is a biosynthetic intermediate for cyclized carotenoid synthesis in plants. It is formed from cyclization of lycopene by lycopene cyclase epsilon. Along with several other carotenoids, γ-carotene is a vitamer of vitamin A in herbivores and omnivores. Carotenoids with a cyclized, beta-ionone ring can be converted to vitamin A, also known as retinol, by the enzyme beta-carotene 15,15'-dioxygenase; however, the bioconversion of γ-carotene to retinol has not been well-characterized. γ-Carotene has tentatively been identified as a biomarker for green and purple sulfur bacteria in a sample from the 1.640 ± 0.003-Gyr-old Barney Creek Formation in Northern Australia which comprises marine sediments. Tentative discovery of γ-carotene in marine sediments implies a past euxinic environment, where water columns were anoxic and sulfidic. This is significant for reconstructing past oceanic conditions, but so far γ-carotene has only been potentially identified in the one measured sample.

== Background ==
γ-Carotene is a carotenoid, a class of pigments giving color to photosynthetic organisms. Specifically, γ-carotene may be derived from myxoxanthophyll found in cyanobacteria, Chlorobiaceae, and green non-sulfur bacteria (Chloroflexi). However, there are over 600 different carotenoids, each with different structures and formulas thus altering their absorption spectrum. In particular, Chromatiaceae lie between 1.5 and 24 meters deep into the water column with more than 75% of the microbial blooms occurring above 12 meters deep. Other carotenoids such as chlorobactane and isorenieratene are also biomarkers for the presence of green non-sulfur bacteria. These carotenoids are indicators of the past aquatic geochemical environment of their source water. In particular, γ-carotene is an indicator of the depth at which oxic conditions move towards anoxic conditions due to its relevance to green and purple sulfur bacteria which occupy the boundary layer. Green non-sulfur bacteria are known to produce 2,3,6-trimethylaryl isoprenoids which are unambiguous, thus permitting the deduction of past aquatic geochemical environments. In γ-carotene, the end group of lycopene produces a β-ring via a β-cyclase enzyme. The other end member is attributed to an open-chain ψ-end.

== Preservation ==
Biomarkers may be defined as the molecular remnants of lipids and other biological makeups. Often, in sedimentary environments, lipids are decomposed into hydrocarbon skeletons where they remain preserved in the geologic record over long timescales. Specifically, diagnostic biomarkers are used to investigate past paleo-environmental conditions such as salinity, temperature, and oxygen availability. In aquatic environments where green non-sulfur bacteria persist, organic carbon is remineralised into carbon dioxide and water such that 0.1% are deposited into the sedimentary record at the aquatic floor. Although γ-carotene is not the diagnostic biomarker for green non-sulfur bacteria, as it has only been tentatively discovered in a natural environment, it is considered a biomarker for green and purple non-sulfur bacteria. Unlike β-carotene which occurs across a vast array of lineages in all three domains of life, γ-carotene is constrained to only a very few potential precursors. Both bacteria present genera of Chromatiaceae containing γ-carotene after diagenesis which has a unique carbon skeleton; therefore, γ-carotene is identifiable through measurement techniques, namely gas chromatography-mass spectrometry. In some cases it is possible to discriminate between different sources of a biomarker using carbon isotopic fractionation techniques.

== Measurement techniques ==
=== GC/MS ===
Gas chromatography-mass spectrometry (GC/MS) is an analytical technique in geochemistry widely employed to identify and quantify organic compounds present in sedimentary rocks. The sample must be extracted from the source rock before the analysis may occur, which is often less than 1% due to the thermal maturity of the source rock. The 1.640 ± 0.003-Gyr-old sample from the Barney Creek Formation underwent an extraction for γ-carotene and subsequent analysis with GC/MS such that there exists a peak at m/z 125 indicating the presence of carotenoid derivatives which elute immediately after β-carotene and γ-carotene.

=== Carbon Isotope Ratios ===
Additional analysis of γ-carotene can be accomplished through the use of an isotope ratio mass spectrometer. Chromatiaceae is generally found to be depleted in δ^{13}C as where Chlorobiaceae are enriched in δ^{13}C in comparison to typical oxygenic bacteria by 7-8 ppm respectively. The results from isotope ratio mass spectroscopy and GC/MS can accurately discriminate the presence of γ-carotene in an extraction from a sedimentary sample. The identification of γ-carotene through these methods would provide a compelling indication of a past euxinic environment, where water columns were anoxic and sulfidic.
