= Ε-Carotene =

ε-Carotene

Names
- IUPAC name ε,ε-carotene
- Other names 4,4'-Didehydro-6,6'-dihydro-β,β-carotene

Identifiers
CAS Number	38894-81-4; 472-89-9 (R,R)
3D model (JSmol)	Interactive image
ChemSpider	393790
PubChem CID	446439
UNII	632758C52E
CompTox Dashboard (EPA)	DTXSID30332225
- InChI: InChI=1S/C40H56/c1-31(19-13-21-33(3)25-27-37-35(5)23-15-29-39(37,7)8)17-11-12-18-32(2)20-14-22-34(4)26-28-38-36(6)24-16-30-40(38,9)10/h11-14,17-28,37-38H,15-16,29-30H2,1-10H3/b12-11+,19-13+,20-14+,27-25+,28-26+,31-17+,32-18+,33-21+,34-22+ Key: QABFXOMOOYWZLZ-JLTXGRSLSA-N; InChI=1/C40H56/c1-31(19-13-21-33(3)25-27-37-35(5)23-15-29-39(37,7)8)17-11-12-18-32(2)20-14-22-34(4)26-28-38-36(6)24-16-30-40(38,9)10/h11-14,17-28,37-38H,15-16,29-30H2,1-10H3/b12-11+,19-13+,20-14+,27-25+,28-26+,31-17+,32-18+,33-21+,34-22+ Key: QABFXOMOOYWZLZ-JLTXGRSLBO
- SMILES: C1(=C/CCC(C)(C)C1\C=C\C(=C\C=C\C(=C\C=C\C=C(\C=C\C=C(\C=C\C2C(=C/CCC2(C)C)\C)C)C)C)C)\C

Properties
Chemical formula	C_{40}H_{56}
Molar mass	536.888 g·mol^{−1}
Appearance	Crystal
Melting point	190 °C
- Except where otherwise noted, data are given for materials in their standard state (at 25 °C [77 °F], 100 kPa). Infobox references

ε-Carotene (epsilon-carotene) is a carotene. It can be synthesized from 2,7-dimethyl-2,4,6-octatrienedial and 2-methyl-4-(2,6,6-trimethyl-2-cyclohexen-1-yl)-3-butenal.
