= Α-Carotene =

Previtamin

α-Carotene

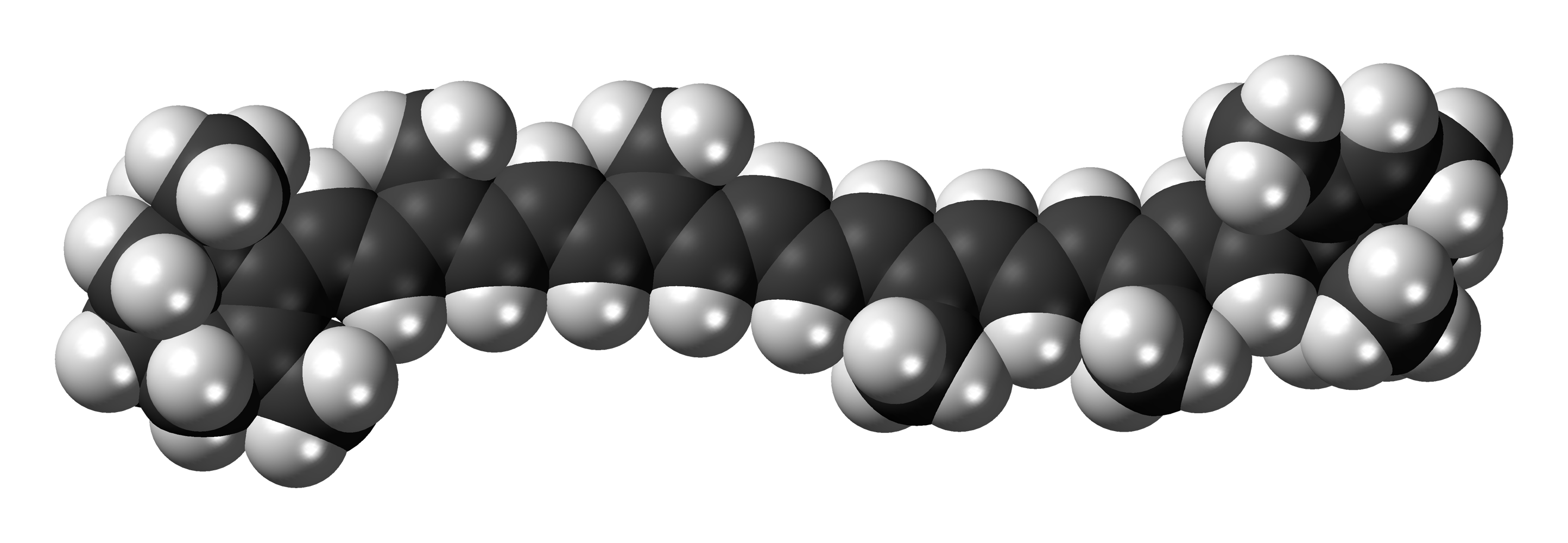

Names
- IUPAC name (6′R)-β,ε-Carotene
- Systematic IUPAC name 1,3,3-Trimethyl-2-{{#parsoidfragment:2}}{(1E,3E,5E,7E,9E,11E,13E,15E,17E)-3,7,12,16-tetramethyl-18-[(1R)-2,6,6-trimethylcyclohex-2-en-1-yl]octadeca-1,3,5,7,9,11,13,15,17-nonaen-1-yl}cyclohex-1-ene

Identifiers
CAS Number	7488-99-5
3D model (JSmol)	Interactive image
ChEBI	CHEBI:28425
ChemSpider	3571861
PubChem CID	6419725
UNII	45XWE1Z69V
CompTox Dashboard (EPA)	DTXSID00893691
- InChI: InChI=1S/C40H56/c1-31(19-13-21-33(3)25-27-37-35(5)23-15-29-39(37,7)8)17-11-12-18-32(2)20-14-22-34(4)26-28-38-36(6)24-16-30-40(38,9)10/h11-14,17-23,25-28,37H,15-16,24,29-30H2,1-10H3/b12-11+,19-13+,20-14+,27-25+,28-26+,31-17+,32-18+,33-21+,34-22+ Key: ANVAOWXLWRTKGA-JLTXGRSLSA-N; InChI=1/C40H56/c1-31(19-13-21-33(3)25-27-37-35(5)23-15-29-39(37,7)8)17-11-12-18-32(2)20-14-22-34(4)26-28-38-36(6)24-16-30-40(38,9)10/h11-14,17-23,25-28,37H,15-16,24,29-30H2,1-10H3/b12-11+,19-13+,20-14+,27-25+,28-26+,31-17+,32-18+,33-21+,34-22+ Key: ANVAOWXLWRTKGA-JLTXGRSLBQ
- SMILES: C\C2=C\CCC(C)(C)C2/C=CC(\C)=C\C=C\C(\C)=C\C=C\C=C(/C)\C=C\C=C(/C)\C=C\C1=C(/C)CCCC1(C)C

Properties
Chemical formula	C_{40}H_{56}
Molar mass	536.873
- Except where otherwise noted, data are given for materials in their standard state (at 25 °C [77 °F], 100 kPa). verify (what is ?) Infobox references

α-Carotene (alpha-carotene) is a form of carotene with a β-ionone ring at one end and an α-ionone ring at the opposite end. It is the second most common form of carotene.

== Human physiology ==
In American and Chinese adults, the mean concentration of serum α-carotene was 4.71 μg/dL. Including 4.22 μg/dL among men and 5.31 μg/dL among women.

== Dietary sources ==
The following vegetables are rich in alpha-carotene:

- Yellow-orange vegetables: Carrots (the main source for U.S. adults), sweet potatoes, pumpkin, winter squash
- Dark-green vegetables: Broccoli, green beans, green peas, spinach, turnip greens, collards, leaf lettuce, avocado

== Research ==
A 2018 meta-analysis found that both dietary and circulating α-carotene are associated with a lower risk of all-cause mortality. The highest circulating α-carotene category, compared to the lowest, correlated with a 32% reduction in the risk of all-cause mortality, while increased dietary α-carotene intake was linked to a 21% decrease in the risk of all-cause mortality.
