= Damascenone =

beta-Damascenone
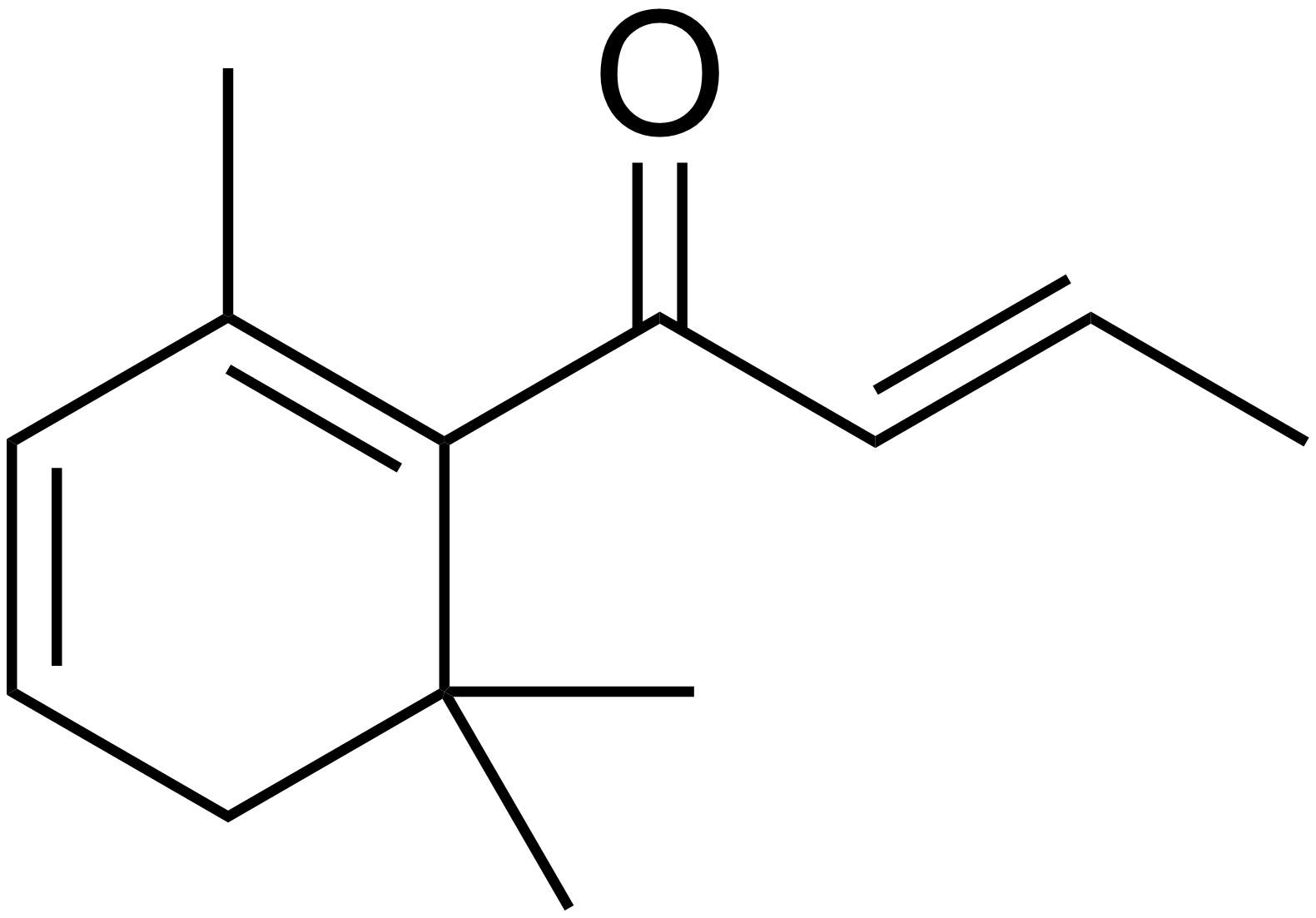

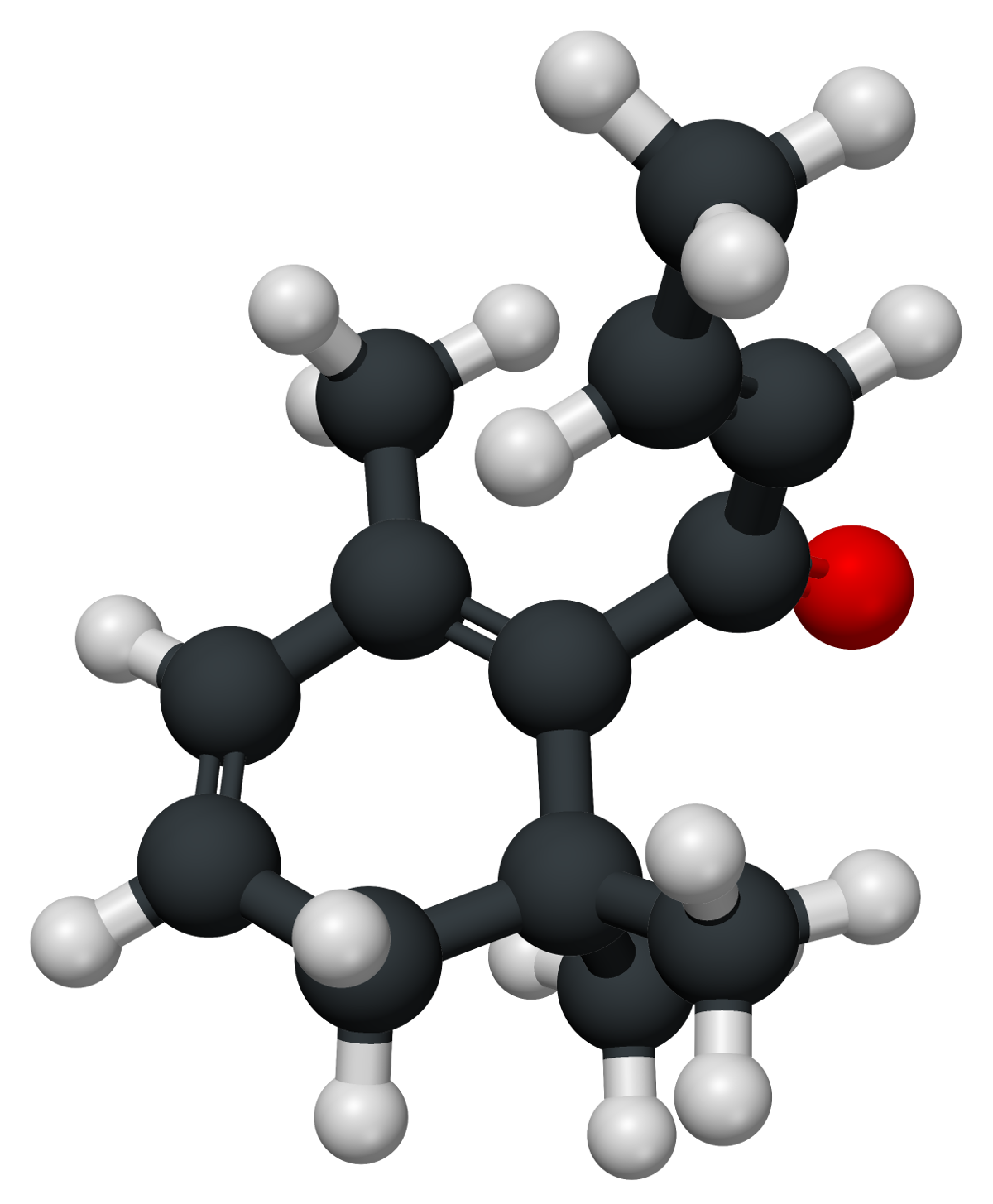

Names
- IUPAC name (E)-1-(2,6,6-Trimethyl-1-cyclohexa-1,3-dienyl)but-2-en-1-one

Identifiers
CAS Number	23726-93-4
3D model (JSmol)	Interactive image
ChEBI	CHEBI:67251
ChemSpider	4517997
ECHA InfoCard	100.041.662
PubChem CID	5366074
UNII	U66V25TBO0
CompTox Dashboard (EPA)	DTXSID90885242
- InChI: InChI=1S/C13H18O/c1-5-7-11(14)12-10(2)8-6-9-13(12,3)4/h5-8H,9H2,1-4H3/b7-5+ Key: POIARNZEYGURDG-FNORWQNLSA-N; InChI=1/C13H18O/c1-5-7-11(14)12-10(2)8-6-9-13(12,3)4/h5-8H,9H2,1-4H3/b7-5+ Key: POIARNZEYGURDG-FNORWQNLBV
- SMILES: O=C(\C1=C(\C=C/CC1(C)C)C)/C=C/C

Properties
Chemical formula	C_{13}H_{18}O
Molar mass	190.286 g·mol^{−1}
Appearance	Pale yellow liquid
Density	0.945-0.952 g/mL
Boiling point	116 degrees C (13 Torr)
Solubility in water	1 mL (in 10 mL 95% ethanol)

Hazards
- Occupational safety and health (OHS/OSH)
Main hazards	Irritant, Environmental hazard
- Except where otherwise noted, data are given for materials in their standard state (at 25 °C [77 °F], 100 kPa). verify (what is ?) Infobox references

Damascenones are a series of closely related chemical compounds that are components of a variety of essential oils. The damascenones belong to a family of chemicals known as rose ketones, which also includes damascones and ionones. beta-Damascenone is a major contributor to the aroma of roses, despite its very low concentration, and is an important fragrance chemical used in perfumery. Its aroma is described as "apple, rose, honey, tobacco, sweet".

The damascenones are derived from the degradation of carotenoids.

β-damascenone is well-known for contributing to the strong aroma of red wines and has been found to enhance the floral, fruity notes of wine and contribute to its characteristic aroma.

In 2008, (E)-β-damascenone was identified as a primary odorant in Kentucky bourbon.

== Biosynthesis ==
The biosynthesis for β-damascenone begins when farnesyl pyrophosphate (FPP) and isopentenyl pyrophosphate (IPP) react to produce geranylgeranyl pyrophosphate (GGPP). The enzyme phytoene synthase (PSY) condenses two GGPP molecules together to produce phytoene, removing diphosphate with a proton shift.

Phytoene then undergoes a series of dehydrogenation reactions. phytoene desaturase (PDS) first desaturates phytoene to produce phytofluene, then ζ-carotene. Other enzymes have been found to catalyze this reaction including CrtI and CrtP. Then ζ-Carotene desaturase (ZDS) catalyzes further desaturation to produce neurosporene followed by lycopene. Other enzymes that are able to catalyze this reaction include CtrI and CrtQ. The desaturation concludes when lycopene β-cyclase catalyzes lycopene cyclization, first producing γ-carotene, then β-carotene:

The cyclization mechanism is as follows:

Next, β-carotene reacts with O_{2} and the enzyme β-carotene ring hydroxylase, producing zeaxanthin. Zeaxanthin then reacts with O_{2}, NADPH, a reduced ferredoxin cluster, and the enzyme zeaxanthin epoxidase (ZE) to produce antheraxanthin which reacts in a similar fashion to produce violaxanthin. Violaxanthin then reacts with the enzyme neoxanthin synthase to form neoxanthin, the main β-damascenone precursor:

In order to generate β-damascenone from neoxanthin there are a few more modifications needed. First, neoxanthin undergoes an oxidative cleavage to create the grasshopper ketone. The grasshopper ketone then undergoes a reduction to generate the allenic triol. At this stage, there are two main pathways the allenic triol can take to produce the final product. The allenic triol can undergo a dehydration reaction to generate either the acetylenic diol or the allenic diol. Finally, one last dehydration reaction of either the acetylenic diol or the allenic diol produces the final product β-damascenone:

The proposed mechanism for the conversion of the allenic triol to the acetylenic diol is:

The proposed mechanism for the conversion of the acetylenic diol to the final product is:

This mechanism is known as a Meyer-Schuster rearrangement.

== See also ==
- Rose oil
