= Phytoene desaturase =

Phytoene desaturase may refer to:

- 15-Cis-phytoene desaturase, enzymes involved in the carotenoid biosynthesis in plants and cyanobacteria
- Phytoene desaturase (lycopene-forming), enzymes found in archaea, bacteria and fungi that are involved in carotenoid biosynthesis
- Phytoene desaturase (zeta-carotene-forming), an enzyme with systematic name 15-cis-phytoene:acceptor oxidoreductase (zeta-carotene-forming)
- Phytoene desaturase (neurosporene-forming), an enzyme with systematic name 15-cis-phytoene:acceptor oxidoreductase (neurosporene-forming)
- Phytoene desaturase (3,4-didehydrolycopene-forming), an enzyme with systematic name 15-cis-phytoene:acceptor oxidoreductase (3,4-didehydrolycopene-forming)
