= 15-Cis-phytoene desaturase =

Class of enzymes

15-cis-phytoene desaturase
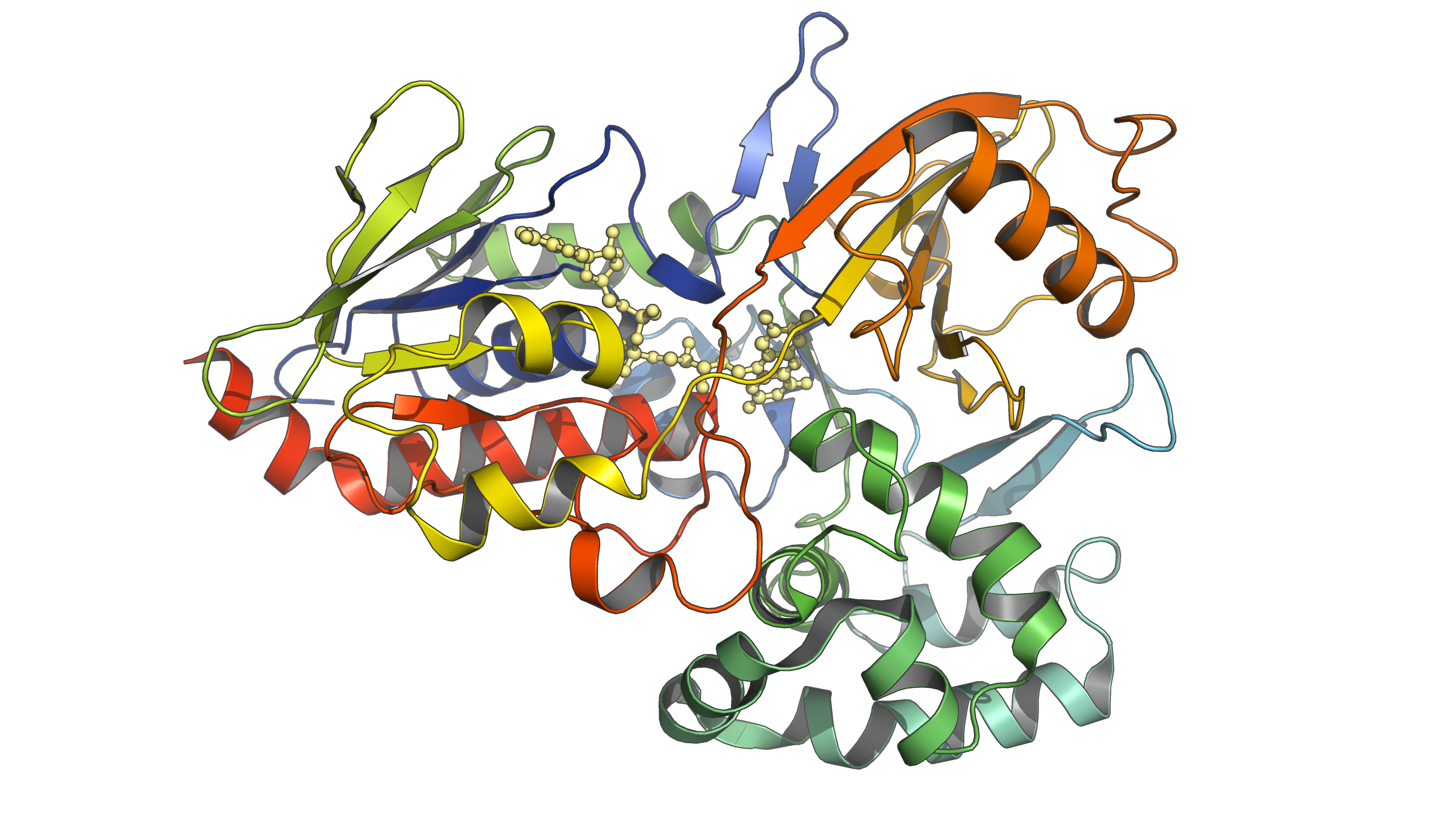
- Crystallographic structure of a phytoene desaturase monomer from rice.

Identifiers
- EC no.: 1.3.5.5

Databases
- BRENDA: enzyme data
- ExPASy: NiceZyme view
- KEGG: enzyme entry
- MetaCyc: metabolic pathway
- Rhea: reactions
- PDB structures: RCSB PDB PDBe PDBsum
- Gene Ontology: AmiGO / QuickGO
Search
- PMC: articles
- PubMed: articles
- NCBI: proteins

15-cis-phytoene desaturases (PDS, plant-type phytoene desaturases) (EC 1.3.5.5, 15-cis-phytoene:plastoquinone oxidoreductase), are enzymes involved in the carotenoid biosynthesis in plants and cyanobacteria. Phytoene desaturases are membrane-bound enzymes localized in plastids and introduce two double bonds into their colorless substrate phytoene by dehydrogenation and isomerize two additional double bonds. This reaction starts a biochemical pathway involving three further enzymes (zeta-carotene isomerase, zeta-carotene desaturase and carotene cis-trans isomerase) called the poly-cis pathway and leads to the red colored lycopene. The homologous phytoene desaturase found in bacteria and fungi (CrtI) converts phytoene directly to lycopene by an all-trans pathway.

== Biochemistry ==
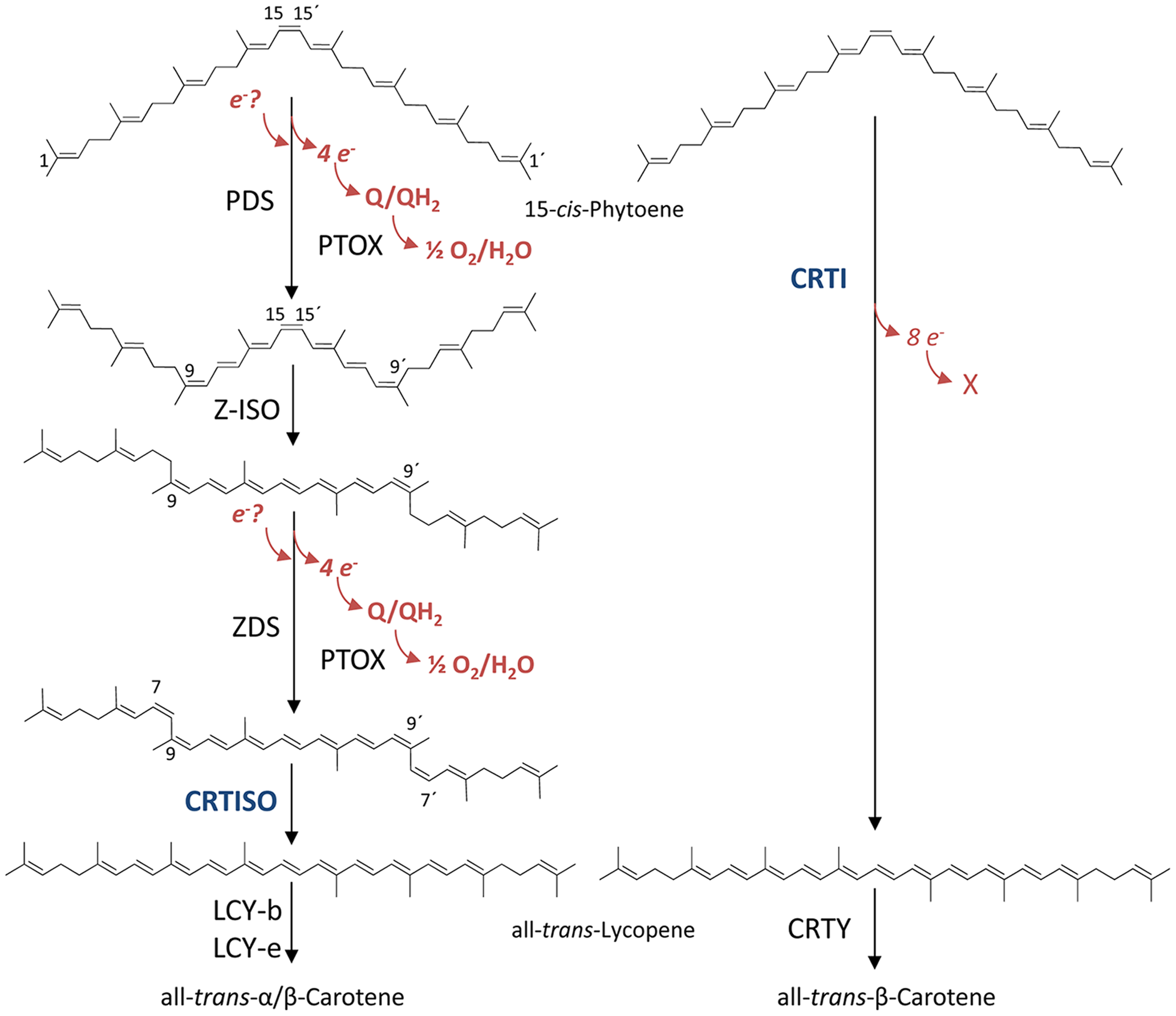
The conversion of phytoene to lycopene in plants and cyanobacteria (left) compared to bacteria and fungi(right).

PDS converts 15-cis-phytoene into 9,15,9'-tri-cis-ζ-carotene through reduction of the enzymes non-covalently bound FAD cofactor. This conversion introduces two additional double bonds at positions 11 and 11' of the carbon chain and isomerizes two adjacent already existing double bonds at positions 9 and 9' from trans to cis. The electrons involved in the reaction are subsequently transferred onto plastoquinone and to plastid terminal oxidase PTOX ultimately coupling the desaturation to oxygen reduction. Disruption of this biosynthesis step results in albinism and stunted plant growth.

== Applications ==
Disruption of PDS function can be achieved by bleaching herbicides such as norflurazon and fluridone. These inhibitors occupy the binding pocket of plastoquinone within the enzyme thus blocking it from its function. Due to the clear effect of PDS disruption in plants, the corresponding gene was targeted to showcase successful genome editing in fruit such as apples, grapes or bananas using CRISPR/Cas9 systems. In rice, the natural PDS was supplemented by its bacterial homolog to create Golden Rice and thus increase the β-carotene content of the rice endosperm. A new PDS disrupting herbicide - rimisoxafen - is moving towards commercial availability

== See also ==
- Phytoene desaturase (lycopene-forming)
- Phytoene desaturase (neurosporene-forming)
- Phytoene desaturase (zeta-carotene-forming)
- Phytoene desaturase (3,4-didehydrolycopene-forming)
