= All-trans-zeta-carotene desaturase =

Identifiers
- EC no.: 1.3.99.26

Databases
- IntEnz: IntEnz view
- BRENDA: BRENDA entry
- ExPASy: NiceZyme view
- KEGG: KEGG entry
- MetaCyc: metabolic pathway
- PRIAM: profile
- PDB structures: RCSB PDB PDBe PDBsum
Search
- PMC: articles
- PubMed: articles
- NCBI: proteins

All-trans-zeta-carotene desaturase (EC 1.3.99.26, Crtlb, phytoene desaturase (ambiguous), 2-step phytoene desaturase (ambiguous), two-step phytoene desaturase (ambiguous), CrtI (ambiguous)) is an enzyme with systematic name all-trans-zeta-carotene:acceptor oxidoreductase. This enzyme catalyses the following chemical reaction

all-trans-zeta-carotene + 2 acceptor $\rightleftharpoons$ all-trans-lycopene + 2 reduced acceptor (overall reaction)
(1a) all-trans-zeta-carotene + acceptor $\rightleftharpoons$ all-trans-neurosporene + reduced acceptor
(1b) all-trans-neurosporene + acceptor $\rightleftharpoons$ all-trans-lycopene + reduced acceptor

This enzyme is involved in carotenoid biosynthesis.
