= Phytoene desaturase (neurosporene-forming) =

Identifiers
- EC no.: 1.3.99.28

Databases
- IntEnz: IntEnz view
- BRENDA: BRENDA entry
- ExPASy: NiceZyme view
- KEGG: KEGG entry
- MetaCyc: metabolic pathway
- PRIAM: profile
- PDB structures: RCSB PDB PDBe PDBsum
Search
- PMC: articles
- PubMed: articles
- NCBI: proteins

Phytoene desaturase (neurosporene-forming) (EC 1.3.99.28, 3-step phytoene desaturase, three-step phytoene desaturase, phytoene desaturase (ambiguous), CrtI (ambiguous)) is an enzyme with systematic name 15-cis-phytoene:acceptor oxidoreductase (neurosporene-forming). This enzyme catalyses the following chemical reaction

15-cis-phytoene + 3 acceptor $\rightleftharpoons$ all-trans-neurosporene + 3 reduced acceptor (overall reaction)
(1a) 15-cis-phytoene + acceptor $\rightleftharpoons$ all-trans-phytofluene + reduced acceptor
(1b) all-trans-phytofluene + acceptor $\rightleftharpoons$ all-trans-zeta-carotene + reduced acceptor
(1c) all-trans-zeta-carotene + acceptor $\rightleftharpoons$ all-trans-neurosporene + reduced acceptor

This enzyme is involved in carotenoid biosynthesis.

== See also ==
- Phytoene desaturase (lycopene-forming)
- 15-Cis-phytoene desaturase
- Phytoene desaturase (zeta-carotene-forming)
- Phytoene desaturase (3,4-didehydrolycopene-forming)
