= Zeta-carotene desaturase =

Zeta-carotene desaturase may refer to the following enzymes:

- 9,9'-Dicis-zeta-carotene desaturase
- Carotene 7,8-desaturase
