= ZDS =

ZDS may refer to:

- Zenith Data Systems, a computer manufacturer in the 1980s
- Za dom spremni, a Croatian nationalist salute
- 9,9'-Dicis-zeta-carotene desaturase, an enzyme
- Health zone (Democratic Republic of the Congo) (French: Zone de santé), an operational health unit in the Democratic Republic of the Congo
