= CRTF =

CRTF may refer to:

- Demethylspheroidene O-methyltransferase, an enzyme
- Coral reef organizations, U.S. Coral Reef Task Force
