= Fluridone =

Names
- Preferred IUPAC name 1-Methyl-3-phenyl-5-[3-(trifluoromethyl)phenyl]pyridin-4(1H)-one
- Other names Sonar; Avast!; Whitecap

Identifiers
CAS Number	59756-60-4
3D model (JSmol)	Interactive image
ChemSpider	39255
ECHA InfoCard	100.056.269
KEGG	C18857
PubChem CID	43079
UNII	3L0JQA61JX
CompTox Dashboard (EPA)	DTXSID8024107
- InChI: InChI=1S/C19H14F3NO/c1-23-11-16(13-6-3-2-4-7-13)18(24)17(12-23)14-8-5-9-15(10-14)19(20,21)22/h2-12H,1H3 Key: YWBVHLJPRPCRSD-UHFFFAOYSA-N; InChI=1/C19H14F3NO/c1-23-11-16(13-6-3-2-4-7-13)18(24)17(12-23)14-8-5-9-15(10-14)19(20,21)22/h2-12H,1H3 Key: YWBVHLJPRPCRSD-UHFFFAOYAR
- SMILES: FC(F)(F)c1cccc(c1)-c2cn(C)cc(c2=O)-c3ccccc3

Properties
Chemical formula	C_{19}H_{14}F_{3}NO
Molar mass	329.3 g/mol
Appearance	colorless solid
Melting point	154.5 °C (310.1 °F; 427.6 K)
- Except where otherwise noted, data are given for materials in their standard state (at 25 °C [77 °F], 100 kPa). Infobox references

Fluridone is an organic compound that is used as aquatic herbicide often used to control invasive plants. It is used in the United States to control hydrilla and Eurasian watermilfoil, among other species. Fluridone is sold as a solution and as a slow release solid, because the herbicide level must be maintained for several weeks. The compound is a colorless solid.

The compound was first reported as a possible herbicide for cotton fields in 1976. It was registered with the U.S. Environmental Protection Agency in 1986 and has low toxicity to animals with no restrictions on swimming or drinking in treated water bodies. Fluridone breaks down in the environment over days or weeks, with the major degradation product being N-methyl formamide. The half-life of fluridone in soils and sediments has been estimated at nine months. Fluridone degradation in soil and saturated sediment has been correlated with temperature and clay content, while degradation in water is largely dependent on UV light exposure. Fluridone transport through the soil, vadose zone, and aquifer is limited by its strong absorbance to organic matter.

== Molecular target ==
Fluridone is a systemic herbicide that works by interfering with carotene formation which leads to chlorophyll degradation. Fluridone and Norflurazon are inhibitors of chloroplastic and cyanobacterial phytoene desaturase, which in turn disrupts the carotenoid biosynthetic pathway.

== Pharmaceutical ==
Fluridone's main method of disrupting photosynthesis in plants is the prevention of the secretion of abscisic acid. As higher eukaryotes, such as humans, also rely on an abscisic acid pathway to create inflammation in normal physiological processes, fluridone is also being investigated in the development of anti-inflammatory agents.

== Biodegradation ==
Fluridone degrades in soil and upon exposure to sunlight with a half-life of ≤21 days.

== See also ==
- Stormy Lake (Alaska), a lake that was treated with fluridone to remove invasive Elodea, an aquatic plant.
