= Spheroidene monooxygenase =

Identifiers
- EC no.: 1.14.15.9

Databases
- IntEnz: IntEnz view
- BRENDA: BRENDA entry
- ExPASy: NiceZyme view
- KEGG: KEGG entry
- MetaCyc: metabolic pathway
- PRIAM: profile
- PDB structures: RCSB PDB PDBe PDBsum
Search
- PMC: articles
- PubMed: articles
- NCBI: proteins

Spheroidene monooxygenase (EC 1.14.15.9, CrtA, acyclic carotenoid 2-ketolase, spirilloxantin monooxygenase, 2-oxo-spirilloxanthin monooxygenase) is an enzyme with systematic name spheroidene, reduced-ferredoxin:oxygen oxidoreductase (spheroiden-2-one-forming). This enzyme catalyses the following chemical reaction

spheroidene + reduced ferredoxin + O_{2} $\rightleftharpoons$ spheroiden-2-one + oxidized ferredoxin + H_{2}O
spirilloxantin + reduced ferredoxin + O_{2} $\rightleftharpoons$ 2-oxospirilloxanthin + oxidized ferredoxin + H_{2}O
2'-oxospirilloxanthin + reduced ferredoxin + O_{2} $\rightleftharpoons$ 2,2'-dioxospirilloxanthin + oxidized ferredoxin + H_{2}O

The enzyme is involved in spheroidenone biosynthesis and in 2,2'-dioxospirilloxanthin biosynthesis.
