= CRT (genetics) =

Gene cluster

CRT is the gene cluster responsible for the biosynthesis of carotenoids. Those genes are found in eubacteria, in algae and are cryptic in Streptomyces griseus.

Carotenoid synthesis is probably present in the common ancestor of Bacteria and Archaea; the phytoene synthase gene crtB is universal among carotenoid synthesizers. Among eukaryotes, plants and algae inherited the cyanobacterial pathway via biosynthesis of their plastids, while fungi retain a archaeal-like pathway. Among all these synthesizers, several possible selection and arrangements of biosynthetic genes exist, consisting of one gene cluster, several clusters, or no clustering at all. (Note: For concrete examples of the diversity of gene organization, compare the clusters presented in figure 1 (6 genomes), PMID 37887056 figure 1 (4 genomes), PMID 22963379 figure 1 (10 genomes), and PMID 32155882 figure 3 (11 genomes).)

== Role of CRT genes in carotenoid biosynthesis ==
The CRT gene cluster consists of twenty-five genes such as crtA, crtB, crtC, crtD, crtE, crtF, crtG, crtH, crtI, crtO, crtP, crtR, crtT, crtU, crtV, and crtY, crtZ. These genes play a role in varying stages of the Astaxanthin biosynthesis and Carotenoid biosynthesis (Table 1).

crtE encodes for an enzyme known as geranylgeranyl diphosphate synthase known to catalyze the condensation reaction of isopentenyl pyrophosphate (IPP) and dimethylallyl pyrophosphate (DMAPP) into geranylgeranyl diphosphate (GGDP). Two GGDP molecules are subsequently converted into a single phytoene molecule by phytoene synthase, an enzyme encoded by crtB, known as PSY in Chlorophyta. The following desaturation of phytoene into ζ-carotene is catalyzed by the phytoene desaturase encoded by crtI, crtP, and/or PDS. ζ -carotene can also be obtained through phytoene using the carotene 2,4-desaturase enzyme (crtD). Depending on the species, varying carotenoids are accumulated following these steps.

=== Spirilloxanthin ===
Spirilloxanthin is obtained from lycopene following a hydration, desaturation, and methylation reaction. These reactions are catalyzed by carotene hydratase (crtC), carotene 3,4- desaturase (crtD), and carotene methyltransferase (crtF), respectively.

=== Canthaxanthin ===
Lycopene is cyclized through two enzymes lycopene cyclase and β-C-4-oxygenase/β-carotene ketolase encoded on the crtY (in Chlorophyta) /crtL (in cyanobacteria), and crtW, respectively. crtY cyclizes lycopene into β-carotene, which is subsequently oxygenated by crtW to form canthaxanthin.

=== Zeaxanthin and lutein ===
Zeaxanthin and lutein are obtained through hydroxylation of α- and β-carotene. Hydroxylation of Zeaxanthin occurs by β-carotene hydroxylase an enzyme encoded on the crtR (in cyanobacteria) and crtZ gene (in Chlorophyta).

=== Other ===
Zeaxanthin can be further processed to obtain zeaxanthin-diglucoside by Zeaxanthin glucosyl transferase (crtX).

Echinenone is obtained from β -carotene through the catalyzing enzyme β-C-4-oxygenase/β-carotene ketolase (crtO). CrtO, also known as bkt2 in Chlorophyta, is also involved in the conversion of other carotenoids into Canthaxanthin, 3-Hydroxyechinenone, 3'-Hydroxyechinenone, Adonixanthin, and Astaxanthin.CrtZ, similarly to crtO, is also capable of converting carotenoids into β-cryptoxanthin, Zeaxanthin, 3-Hydroxyechinenone, 3'-Hydroxyechinenone, Astaxanthin, Adonixanthin, and Adonirubin.

crtH catalyzes the isomerization of cis-carotenes into trans-carotenes through carotenoid isomerase.

crtG encodes for carotenoid 2,2'- β-hydroxylase, this enzyme leads to the formation of 2-hydroxylated and 2,2′-dihydroxylated products in E coli.

Table 1: role of CRT genes in carotenoid biosynthesis
| Gene | Enzyme | Catalyzed reaction |
|---|---|---|
| crtE | GGDP synthase | IPP and DMAPP conversion to GGDP |
| crtB (PSY*) | Phytoene Synthase (universal) | GGDP conversion to phytoene |
| crtP (PDS*) | Phytoene desaturase (Chlorobi, Cyanobacteria, plant, algae) | Conversion of phytoene into ζ- carotene |
| crtI | Phytoeine desaturase (Archaea, fungi, most Bacteria) | Conversion of phytoene into ζ- carotene |
| crtQ | ζ- carotene desaturase (Qa: 'evolved from CrtI; Qb: evolved from CrtP) | Desaturation of ζ- carotene to lycopene |
| crtH | Carotenoid isomerase | Isomeration of cis to trans carotones |
| crtY | Lycopene cyclase (Bacteria except Firmicutes, Chlorobi, Cyanobacteria, Actinobacteria) | Cyclization of lycopene |
| crtL | Lycopene cyclase (two in Cyanobacteria: crtL-b became plant lcy-B, crtL-e became plant lcy-E) | Cyclization of lycopene |
| crtD | Carotene 3,4-desaturase | Conversion of phytoene to ζ-carotene |
| crtA | Spheroidene monooxygenase | Conversion of spheroidene to spheroidenone |
| crtR^{+} | β-carotene hydroxylase (various Cyanobacteria) | Hydroxylation of β-carotene to zeaxanthin |
| crtZ* | β-carotene hydroxylase (various Chlorophyta) | Hydroxylation of β-carotene to zeaxanthin |
| crtX | Zeaxanthin glucosyl transferase | Conversion of zeaxanthin to zeaxanthin-diglucoside |
| crtW (bkt2*) | β-C-4-oxygenase/β-carotene ketolase | Conversion of β-carotene to canthaxanthin |
| crtO | β-C-4-oxygenase/β-carotene ketolase | Conversion of β-carotene to echinenone |
| crtC | Carotene hydratase | Conversion of neurosporene to demethylspheroidene and lycopene to hydroxy derivatives |
| crtG | Carotenoid 2,2′-β-hydroxylase | Conversion of myxol to 2-hydroxymyxol and zeaxanthin to nostoxanthin |
| crtK | Carotenoid regulation | - |
* In Chlorophyta, ^{+} In cyanobacteria

== Phylogeny ==
Previous studies have indicated through phylogenetic analysis that evolutionary patterns of crt genes are characterized by horizontal gene transfer and gene duplication events.

Horizontal gene transfer has been hypothesized to have occurred between cyanobacteria and Chlorophyta, as similarities in these genes have been found across taxa. Note, however, that some cyanobacteria retained their nature. Horizontal gene transfer among species occurred with a high probability in genes involved in the initial steps of the carotenoid biosynthesis pathway such as crtE, crtB, crtY, crtL, PSY, and crtQ. These genes are often well conserved while others involved in the later stages of Carotenoid biosynthesis such as crtW and crtO are less conserved. The less conserved nature of these genes allowed for the expansion of the carotenoid biosynthesis pathway and its end products. Amino acid variations within crt genes have evolved due to purifying and adaptive selection.

Gene duplications are suspected to have occurred due to the presence of multiple copies of ctr clusters or genes within a single species. An example of this can be seen in the Bradyrhizobium ORS278 strain, where initial crt genes can be found (excluding crtC, crtD, and crtF genes) as well as a second crt gene cluster. This second gene cluster has been shown to also be involved in carotenoid biosynthesis using its crt paralogs.
