= Phytoene desaturase (lycopene-forming) =

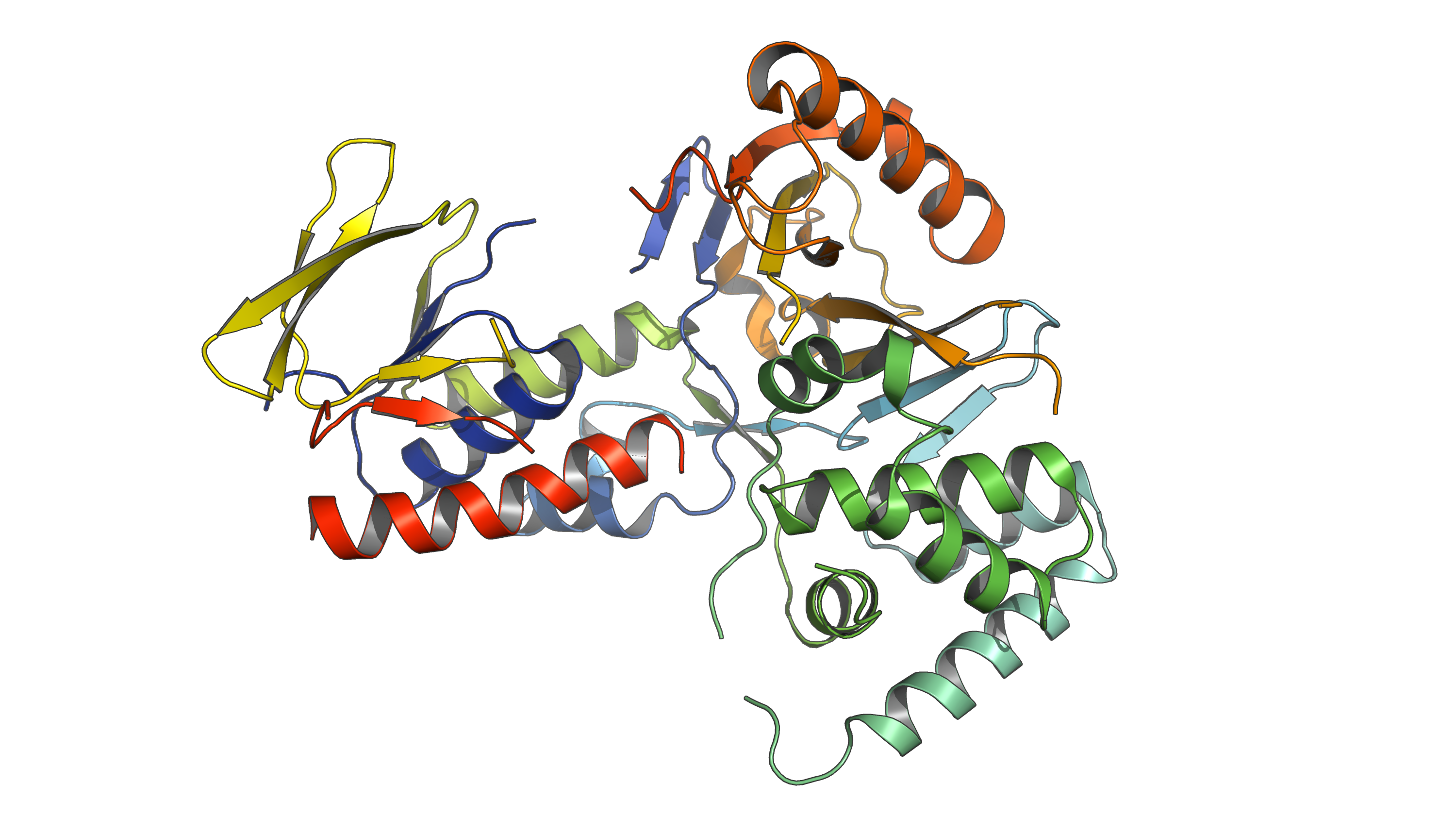
- Crystallographic structure of a bacterial phytoene desaturase monomer from Pantoea ananatis.

Identifiers
- EC no.: 1.3.99.31

Databases
- IntEnz: IntEnz view
- BRENDA: BRENDA entry
- ExPASy: NiceZyme view
- KEGG: KEGG entry
- MetaCyc: metabolic pathway
- PRIAM: profile
- PDB structures: RCSB PDB PDBe PDBsum
Search
- PMC: articles
- PubMed: articles
- NCBI: proteins

Phytoene desaturase (lycopene-forming) (CrtI, four-step phytoene desaturase) (EC 1.3.99.31, 15-cis-phytoene:acceptor oxidoreductase (lycopene-forming)) are enzymes found in archaea, bacteria and fungi that are involved in carotenoid biosynthesis. They catalyze the conversion of colorless 15-cis-phytoene into a bright red lycopene in a biochemical pathway called the poly-trans pathway. The same process in plants and cyanobacteria utilizes four separate enzymes in a poly-cis pathway.

== Biochemistry ==
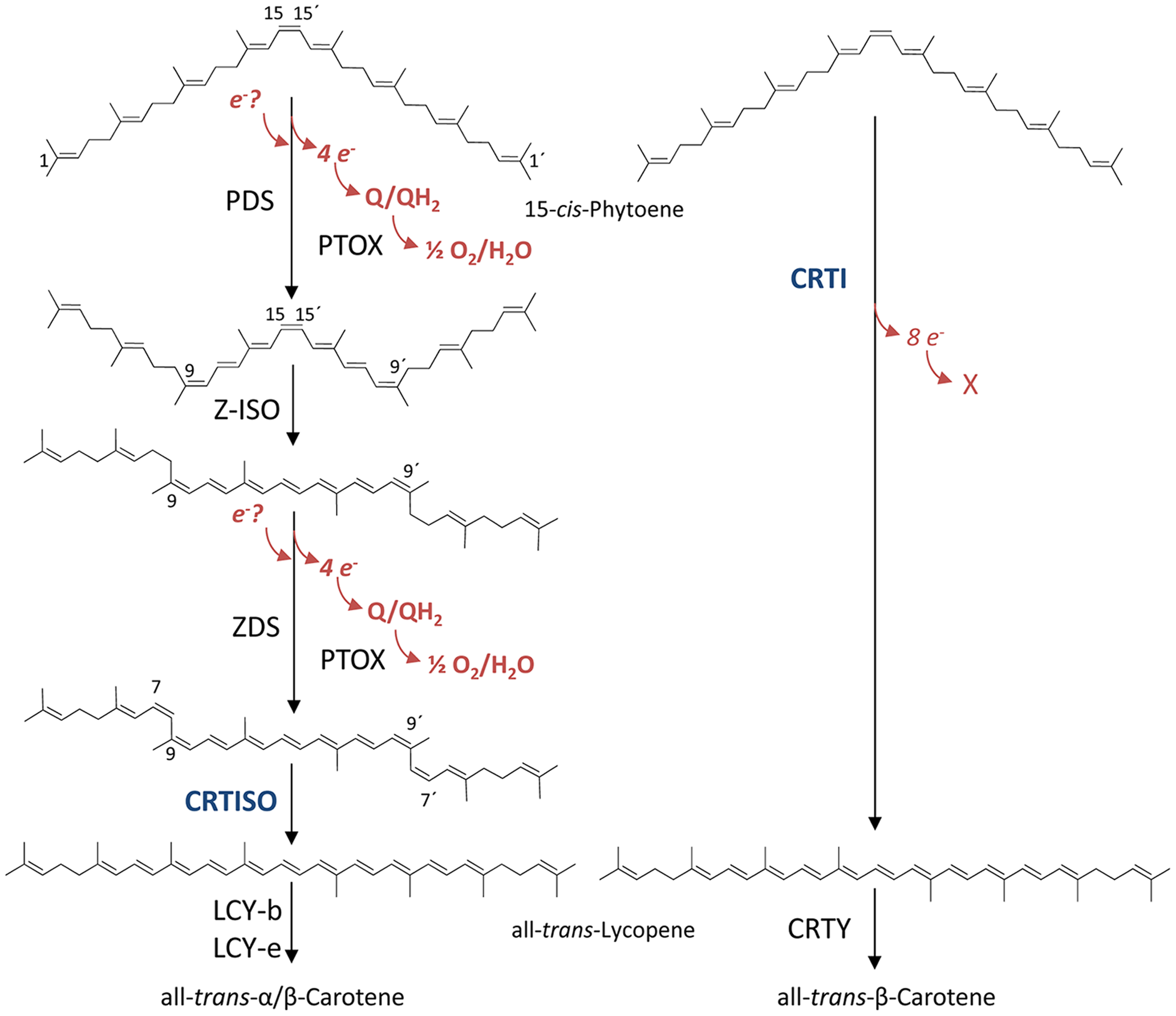
The conversion of phytoene to lycopene in plants and cyanobacteria (left) compared to bacteria and fungi(right).

Bacterial phytoene desaturases were shown to require FAD as a cofactor for their function. During the chemical reaction in total four additional double bonds are introduced into phytoene:

15-cis-phytoene + 4 acceptor $\rightleftharpoons$ all-trans-lycopene + 4 reduced acceptor (overall reaction)
(1a) 15-cis-phytoene + acceptor $\rightleftharpoons$ all-trans-phytofluene + reduced acceptor
(1b) all-trans-phytofluene + acceptor $\rightleftharpoons$ all-trans-zeta-carotene + reduced acceptor
(1c) all-trans-zeta-carotene + acceptor $\rightleftharpoons$ all-trans-neurosporene + reduced acceptor:
(1d) all-trans-neurosporene + acceptor $\rightleftharpoons$ all-trans-lycopene + reduced acceptor

== Applications ==
In 2000 it was discovered that the gene insertion of a bacterial phytoene desaturase into transgenic tomatoes increased the lycopene content without the need to alter several of the plants enzymes. This approach was later used in rice to increase its β-carotene content resulting in the Golden Rice project.

== See also ==
- 15-''Cis''-phytoene desaturase
- Phytoene desaturase (neurosporene-forming)
- Phytoene desaturase (zeta-carotene-forming)
- Phytoene desaturase (3,4-didehydrolycopene-forming)
