= Carotene 7,8-desaturase =

Oxidoreductases enzyme

carotene 7,8-desaturase

Identifiers
- EC no.: 1.14.99.30

Databases
- IntEnz: IntEnz view
- BRENDA: BRENDA entry
- ExPASy: NiceZyme view
- KEGG: KEGG entry
- MetaCyc: metabolic pathway
- PRIAM: profile
- PDB structures: RCSB PDB PDBe PDBsum
- Gene Ontology: AmiGO / QuickGO
Search
- PMC: articles
- PubMed: articles
- NCBI: proteins

In enzymology, a carotene 7,8-desaturase (EC 1.14.99.30) is an enzyme that catalyzes the chemical reaction

neurosporene + AH_{2} + O_{2} $\rightleftharpoons$ lycopene + A + 2 H_{2}O

The 3 substrates of this enzyme are neurosporene, an electron acceptor AH_{2}, and O_{2}, whereas its 3 products are lycopene, the reduction product A, and H_{2}O.

This enzyme belongs to the family of oxidoreductases, specifically those acting on paired donors, with O2 as oxidant and incorporation or reduction of oxygen. The oxygen incorporated need not be derived from O miscellaneous. The systematic name of this enzyme class is carotene, hydrogen-donor:oxygen oxidoreductase. This enzyme is also called zeta-carotene desaturase. This enzyme participates in carotenoid biosynthesis - general.
