= Lycopene epsilon-cyclase =

Lycopene ε-cyclase

Identifiers
- EC no.: 5.5.1.18

Databases
- IntEnz: IntEnz view
- BRENDA: BRENDA entry
- ExPASy: NiceZyme view
- KEGG: KEGG entry
- MetaCyc: metabolic pathway
- PRIAM: profile
- PDB structures: RCSB PDB PDBe PDBsum
Search
- PMC: articles
- PubMed: articles
- NCBI: proteins

Lycopene ε-cyclase (EC 5.5.1.18, CrtL-e, LCYe) is an enzyme with systematic name carotenoid psi-end group lyase (decyclizing). This enzyme catalyses the following chemical reaction

carotenoid psi-end group $\rightleftharpoons$ carotenoid epsilon-end group

The carotenoid lycopene has the psi-end group at both ends.
