= Demethylspheroidene O-methyltransferase =

Identifiers
- EC no.: 2.1.1.210

Databases
- IntEnz: IntEnz view
- BRENDA: BRENDA entry
- ExPASy: NiceZyme view
- KEGG: KEGG entry
- MetaCyc: metabolic pathway
- PRIAM: profile
- PDB structures: RCSB PDB PDBe PDBsum
Search
- PMC: articles
- PubMed: articles
- NCBI: proteins

Demethylspheroidene O-methyltransferase (EC 2.1.1.210, 1-hydroxycarotenoid O-methylase, 1-hydroxycarotenoid methylase, 1-HO-carotenoid methylase, CrtF) is an enzyme with systematic name S-adenosyl-L-methionine:demethylspheroidene O-methyltransferase. This enzyme catalyses the following chemical reaction

S-adenosyl-L-methionine + demethylspheroidene $\rightleftharpoons$ S-adenosyl-L-homocysteine + spheroidene

In Rhodopseudomonas capsulata and Rubrivivax gelatinosus the enzyme is involved in biosynthesis of spheroidene.
