= Spheroidene =

all-trans-spheroidene
- All-trans-spheroidene

Names
- IUPAC name (3E)-1-Methoxy-3,4-didehydro-1,2,7',8'-tetrahydro-ψ,ψ-carotene
- Systematic IUPAC name (6E,10E,12E,14E,16E,18E,20E,22E,24E,26E,28E)-31-methoxy-2,6,10,14,19,23,27,31-octamethyldotriaconta-2,6,10,12,14,16,18,20,22,24,26,28-dodecaene
- Other names: Pigment Y

Identifiers
CAS Number	13836-61-8
3D model (JSmol)	Interactive image
ChEBI	CHEBI:35330
ChemSpider	4898273
KEGG	C15900
MeSH	spheroidene
PubChem CID	6368932
CompTox Dashboard (EPA)	DTXSID701318186
- InChI: Key: FJOCMTHZSURUFA-AXYGSFPTSA-N; InChI=1S/C41H60O/c1-34(2)20-14-23-37(5)26-17-29-38(6)27-15-24-35(3)21-12-13-22-36(4)25-16-28-39(7)30-18-31-40(8)32-19-33-41(9,10)42-11/h12-13,15-16,18-22,24-28,30-32H,14,17,23,29,33H2,1-11H3/b13-12+,24-15+,25-16+,30-18+,32-19+,35-21+,36-22+,37-26+,38-27+,39-28+,40-31+
- SMILES: CC(=CCC/C(=C/CC/C(=C/C=C/C(=C/C=C/C=C(\C)/C=C/C=C(\C)/C=C/C=C(\C)/C=C/CC(C)(C)OC)/C)/C)/C)C

Properties
Chemical formula	C_{41}H_{60}O
Molar mass	568.930 g·mol^{−1}
Melting point	135–138 °C (275–280 °F; 408–411 K)
- Except where otherwise noted, data are given for materials in their standard state (at 25 °C [77 °F], 100 kPa). Infobox references

Spheroidene is a carotenoid pigment. It is a component of the photosynthetic reaction center of certain purple bacteria of the Rhodospirillaceae family, including Rhodobacter sphaeroides and Rhodopseudomonas sphaeroides. Like other carotenoids, it is a tetraterpenoid. In purified form, it is a brick-red solid soluble in benzene.

Spheroidene was discovered by microbiologist C. B. van Niel, who named it "pigment Y". It was renamed by Basil Weedon, who was the first to prepare it synthetically, and to determine its structure, in the mid-1960s.

== Function ==
Spheroidene is bound to the type II photosynthetic reaction center of purple bacteria, and together with the bacteriochlorophyll forms part of the light-harvesting complex. Spheroidene has two major functions in the complex. First, it absorbs visible light in the blue-green part of the visible spectrum (320–500 nm), where bacteriochlorophyll has little absorbance. It then transfers energy to the bacteriochlorophyll via singlet–singlet energy transfer. In this manner the reaction center is able to harness more of the visible light spectrum than would be possible with bacteriochlorophyll alone. Second, spheroidene quenches excited singlet states of bacteriochlorophyll by forming a stable triplet state. This quenching helps to prevent the formation of harmful singlet oxygen. Other functions of spheroidene may include scavenging of singlet oxygen, nonradiative dissipation of excess light energy, and structural stabilization of the photosystem proteins.

Spheroidene is thought to exist as the 15,15'-cis isomer, and not the all-trans isomer commonly shown in the literature, in native photosynthetic reaction centers.

== Biosynthesis ==
The proteins involved in spheroidene biosynthesis are encoded by a gene cluster. Geranylgeranyl pyrophosphate (GGPP) is the precursor to spheroidene and the other carotenoids; two molecules of GGPP condense to form the symmetric tetraterpene phytoene. This molecule then undergoes three desaturations to form neurosporene, which is then hydroxylated, desaturated again, and methoxylated to produce spheroidene. In some species, spheroidene is further oxygenated to produce the ketone spheroidenone.

== See also ==
- Photosynthesis
- Förster resonance energy transfer
- Antioxidant
