= Lycopersene =

Carotenoid

Names
- IUPAC name (6E,10E,14E,18E,22E,26E)-2,6,10,14,19,23,27,31-Octamethyldotriaconta-2,6,10,14,18,22,26,30-octaene
- Other names Lycopaoctaene

Identifiers
CAS Number	502-62-5
3D model (JSmol)	Interactive image
ChEBI	CHEBI:142538
ChemSpider	4517760
KEGG	C22055
PubChem CID	5365816
CompTox Dashboard (EPA)	DTXSID901318251
- InChI: InChI=1S/C40H66/c1-33(2)19-13-23-37(7)27-17-31-39(9)29-15-25-35(5)21-11-12-22-36(6)26-16-30-40(10)32-18-28-38(8)24-14-20-34(3)4/h19-22,27-30H,11-18,23-26,31-32H2,1-10H3/b35-21+,36-22+,37-27+,38-28+,39-29+,40-30+ Key: BGVXBZXEFXMRGJ-DPOFWPLISA-N
- SMILES: CC(=CCC/C(=C/CC/C(=C/CC/C(=C/CC/C=C(/CC/C=C(/CC/C=C(/CCC=C(C)C)\C)\C)\C)/C)/C)/C)C

Properties
Chemical formula	C_{40}H_{66}
Molar mass	546.968 g·mol^{−1}
- Except where otherwise noted, data are given for materials in their standard state (at 25 °C [77 °F], 100 kPa). Infobox references

Lycopersene is a carotenoid found in Corynebacterium, Lemna minor, and Zea mays. It has the chemical formula of C_{40}H_{66.} It has antioxidant, antimutagenic, antiproliferative, cytotoxicity, antibacterial and pesticide effects.
