= Carotenoid complex =

Class of chemical substances

Carotenoid complexes are physical associations of carotenoids with other molecules.

== Carotenoids and lipids ==
Carotenoids are hydrophobic molecules that are usually coupled with lipids to form complexes.

=== Role in Biology ===
Carotenoids help living species to adapt to environmental stresses, in particular temperature variations by making complexes with lipids.

Their role in supporting photosynthesis is also well documented.

Since plants, or microorganisms such algae, fungi and bacteria, have exposure to a much higher day-night, seasonal or other environmental temperature variability than animals, it is not surprising that the level of carotenoids in their tissues is 10^{3} – 10^{6} higher than in animals. Ectothermic animals, which do not have their own mechanism to control body temperature, rely more on accumulation of ingested carotenoids than endotherms, which can maintain their thermal homeostasis. It is not surprising that in tissues of fish or reptiles, carotenoid concentration could be from 10 to 100 fold higher than in mammalians.

Different lipids have different crystalline structures, which determine their viscosity and heat or thermal conductivity. This in turn affects membrane signaling and transport, energy production and other processes essential for cellular metabolism and functions. For a plant cell to synthesize 1 molecule of a carotenoid, which can change the viscosity and thermal energy conductivity of 10,000 or even 100,000 molecules of lipids, would be much faster and more economic than to activate a lipid replacement process, which would involve a few hundred or thousand more new lipid molecules to be synthesized.

In animals and humans, carotenoid lipid complexes play an additional role to temperature adaptation role, or thermogenesis. They are able to control lipid droplet formation, LD, and mitochondrial activation/respiration, blood plasma lipoprotein oxygen transport, control of and tissue oxygenation.

=== Role in nutrition ===
==== Vegetable oils ====
Oils used today as a food ingredient or for cooking are highly refined or ultra-processed products, which contribute, alongside refined sugars to the global obesity pandemic. Removal of carotenoids from pressed raw oils, together with other "impurities", significantly changes their physical and nutritional properties, making oils faster to digest, hence increases calorie absorption and postprandial (post-meal) lipidaemia.

L-tug technology reintroduces carotenoids back to refined oils, making complexes with them and restoring their natural health beneficial properties and reducing their digestion rate and lipid and calorie absorption.

==== Animal fats ====
Green grass grazed cows produce carotenoid rich milk lipid globules, which have fat with a lower digestion rate than those fed with carotenoid depleted hay or cattle feed. Since green grass is not available in many countries throughout the year, an alternative is L-tug technology. This improves the nutritional properties of dairy or other animal fat by forming complexes with carotenoids which are naturally present in grass or other plants that animals eat.

== Lycosome ==
The name lycosome (not to be confused with lysosome) originated from the first group of such complexes which used lycopene, one of the carotenoid molecules.

=== Improvement in bioavailability ===
==== Absorption ====
Formation of these complexes could be useful in improving absorption and efficacy of those vitamin, nutraceutical and pharmaceutical molecules which have reduced bioavailability due to their sensitivity to stomach acidity and/or digestive enzymes. Carotenoids can provide protection from such factors and this would enable more bioactive molecules to reach points of their absorption in an unmodified form which can improve pharmacokinetics and efficacy of these molecules.

Use of lycosomes can also reduce administered doses, hence the cost of the products, without reduction of their therapeutic effect.

==== Tissue bioavailability ====
Absorption of bioactive molecules is essential but not sufficient to achieve their supplementation or therapeutic objectives. They need to be available from blood circulation to body tissues. Hydrophobic molecules cannot be transported in blood by themselves but only as a part of lipoprotein particles. Their incorporation into these particles happens firstly in enterocytes during chylomicron formation and then, secondly, during lipoprotein assembly in the liver.

If lipoprotein particles get modified, for example during peroxidation, their ability to transport hydrophobic molecules is reduced. The presence of carotenoids can protect lipoproteins from peroxidation and improve their transportation role. Therefore, complexes of carotenoids with hydrophobic bioactive molecules can improve not only their absorption but also tissue bioavailability.

==== Carotenoid incorporation into lipoproteins ====
Carotenoids enter lipoprotein structures during their assembly.

Phospholipids, in particular phosphatidylcholine, play a critical role in this process as scaffolding for lipids, proteins and other hydrophobic molecules. If there is a deficiency in phospholipids or they get oxidized, which happen, alongside other components of lipoproteins, the assembly of these particles gets impaired. As a result of this, despite sufficient intake of carotenoids, their concentration in blood and tissue delivery would be reduced.

This oxidation could be caused by tissue steatosis and hypoxia as a consequence of inflammation in fatty liver, NASH or NAFLD, in obese people or even, on a subclinical level, in the elderly.

=== Targeted delivery ===
The spectrum of carotenoids varies in different organs and different tissues. For example, lycopene can be found in most human body tissues but preferably accumulated in the liver, adrenal glands and male reproductive system. Another carotenoid, lutein is also found in different organs but it is one of the most preferred carotenoids of the brain and its retina and of the ovaries.

This different affinity of different carotenoids to different organs can be used for more targeted delivery of hydrophobic bioactive molecules. After absorption of components of carotenoid complexes with these molecules, they all will be co-incorporated into lipoprotein particles assembled in enterocytes, or in the liver. Carotenoids with preferential affinity to different organs may serve as a vector for the whole particles and for more targeted delivery of their "cargo" of bioactive molecules.

Inclusion of carotenoids into complexes with hydrophobic bioactive molecules, which have metabolic or therapeutic targets in particular organs, can reduce their concentration in other organs. This on the one hand reduces potential side effects of these molecules in non-targeted organs, and on the other reduces administered doses, hence the cost of the products, without reduction of their therapeutic effect.

=== New mode of action – tissue oxygenation ===
Carotenoids, in their complexes with other bioactive molecules, can not only improve their bioavailability and facilitate targeted delivery, but themselves have important biological and therapeutic properties. Since they can protect lipid structures from oxidative damage, they can protect their functions as well. One of the important roles of plasma lipoproteins is their ability to transport molecular oxygen into interstitial or intracellular fluid.

Reduction of the oxygen carrying capacity of these particles leads to a reduction in oxygen supply to tissues and in severe cases contributes to development of tissue hypoxia. Carotenoids, by helping to maintain the crystalline structure not only of plasma lipoproteins but also cellular membranes and intracellular lipid droplets, can support their oxygen carrying / holding capacity. This could be important for aerobic respiration and mitochondrial ATP synthesis on the cellular level and as a part of anti-hypoxia treatment on the tissue and organ level.

Therefore, formation of complexes of carotenoids with bioactive molecules may not only improve their own efficacy, but add a new tissue oxygenation modality, which can synergistically benefit supplementation or therapeutic objectives.

=== LycoD3 ===
LycoD3 is a complex of lycopene with vitamin D3, or cholecalciferol. This vitamin is very important not only for the control of calcium metabolism but also for the support of immune system and inflammation. Therefore, treatment of D3 deficiencies is an important health issue. LycoD3 aims to overcome metabolic difficulties with D3 supplements.

==== Supplementation challenges ====
Not all D3 deficiencies can be effectively supplemented or treated with vitamin D3 on its own. Older people or those who have fatty liver or metabolic syndrome have a declined ability to absorb, transport and activate vitamin D3. In addition, in overweight or obese persons an excessive adipose tissue can sequester D3 from the circulation and reduce its access to other tissues.

==== Liver – gut activation ====
For vitamin D3 to perform its regulatory roles, it needs to be converted into biologically active metabolites. This activation by a hydroxylation cascade begins in two locations in the body, the liver by the cytochrome P450 system, and the gut by its microbiome. The lycopene and phosphatidylcholine complex with vitamin D3 is able not only to protect it from stomach acidity but also to facilitate its delivery to the locations where it can be activated.

Lycopene was chosen for a number of reasons. Firstly, it is relatively more resistant to acidic degradation than other carotenoids most used in humans. Secondly, since after oral administration absorbed vitamin D3 is transported by chylomicrons, co-incorporated lycopene, which has an affinity to the liver, would facilitate D3 delivery to that organ where it can be hydroxylated. The third reason is that lycopene is able not only support vitamin D3 transition and activation in the gut but also activate microbiome immunity there, which would be synergetic to D3 efficacy.

=== Clinically validated carotenoid complexes with nutraceutical and pharmaceutical molecules ===
All of the complexes listed below, apart from superior pharmacokinetics and/or pharmacodynamics over complex-free bioactives, have the additional ability to reduce blood markers of oxidative and inflammatory damage and anti-hypoxic efficacy.

Lycopene – phosphatidylcholine – anti-inflammatory whey protein isolate.

Lycopene – phosphatidylcholine – trans-resveratrol: promotes foot ulcer regeneration in patients with diabetes 2.

Diabetic foot ulcer images before and after 60-day trans-resveratrol lycosome or placebo treatment.

Lycopene – phosphatidylcholine - soy isoflavones: reduces insulin resistance on a par with metformin

Lycopene – phosphatidylcholine – simvastatin

LycoD3, Lycopene – phosphatidylcholine – vitamin D3: 6 fold improvement in pharmacokinetics of activated 25(OH)D3 over the complex-free D3

Lycopene – phosphatidylcholine – Coenzyme Q10: 7 fold improvement in pharmacokinetics over the complex-free Q10^{[45]}

Lycopene – Anthocyanins: 3 fold improvement in pharmacokinetics over the complex-free anthocyanins

Lutein – Anthocyanins: 7 fold improvement in pharmacokinetics over the complex-free anthocyanins

Astaxanthin – Anthocyanins: 8.5 fold improvement in pharmacokinetics over the complex-free anthocyanins

Lycopene – 50 mg phosphatidylcholine: improvement of lycopene pharmacokinetics by 8 fold in patients with coronary heart disease

Lycopene – 450 mg phosphatidylcholine: improvement effective dose by 4 fold and liver span reduction in NAFLD patients

Lycopene – DHA Omega 3: superior efficacy in blood triglyceride reduction with effective dose 8-16 fold lower than the complex-free DHA Omega 3, with additional LDL lowering effect

Lutein – Zeaxanthin – DHA Omega 3: 8-10 fold improvement in pharmacokinetics

Lutein – Cacao Epicatechins – Dark chocolate lipids - co-crystallisation^{[45]}

Astaxanthin – Cacao Epicatechins – Dark chocolate lipids - co-crystallisation: 2.5-3.5 fold improvement in astaxanthin pharmacokinetics
