= Prolycopene isomerase =

Identifiers
- EC no.: 5.2.1.13

Databases
- IntEnz: IntEnz view
- BRENDA: BRENDA entry
- ExPASy: NiceZyme view
- KEGG: KEGG entry
- MetaCyc: metabolic pathway
- PRIAM: profile
- PDB structures: RCSB PDB PDBe PDBsum
Search
- PMC: articles
- PubMed: articles
- NCBI: proteins

Prolycopene isomerase (EC 5.2.1.13, CRTISO, carotene cis-trans isomerase, ZEBRA2 (gene), carotene isomerase, carotenoid isomerase) is an enzyme with systematic name 7,9,7',9'-tetracis-lycopene cis-trans-isomerase. This enzyme catalyses the following chemical reaction

7,9,7',9'-tetracis-lycopene $\rightleftharpoons$ all-trans-lycopene

This enzyme is involved in carotenoid biosynthesis.
