= Zeta-carotene isomerase =

ζ-Carotene isomerase

Identifiers
- EC no.: 5.2.1.12

Databases
- IntEnz: IntEnz view
- BRENDA: BRENDA entry
- ExPASy: NiceZyme view
- KEGG: KEGG entry
- MetaCyc: metabolic pathway
- PRIAM: profile
- PDB structures: RCSB PDB PDBe PDBsum
Search
- PMC: articles
- PubMed: articles
- NCBI: proteins

ζ-Carotene isomerase (EC 5.2.1.12, Z-ISO, 15-cis-zeta-carotene isomerase) is an enzyme with systematic name 9,15,9'-tricis-zeta-carotene cis-trans-isomerase. This enzyme catalyses the following chemical reaction

9,15,9'-tricis-zeta-carotene $\rightleftharpoons$ 9,9'-dicis-zeta-carotene

This enzyme is involved in carotenoid biosynthesis.
