= 9,9'-Dicis-zeta-carotene desaturase =

Class of enzymes

9,9'-dicis-zeta-carotene desaturase

Identifiers
- EC no.: 1.3.5.6

Databases
- IntEnz: IntEnz view
- BRENDA: BRENDA entry
- ExPASy: NiceZyme view
- KEGG: KEGG entry
- MetaCyc: metabolic pathway
- PRIAM: profile
- PDB structures: RCSB PDB PDBe PDBsum
Search
- PMC: articles
- PubMed: articles
- NCBI: proteins

9,9'-dicis-zeta-carotene desaturase (EC 1.3.5.6, zeta-carotene desaturase, ZDS) is an enzyme with systematic name 9,9'-dicis-zeta-corotene:quinone oxidoreductase. This enzyme catalyses the following chemical reaction

9,9'-dicis-zeta-carotene + 2 quinone $\rightleftharpoons$ 7,9,7',9'-tetracis-lycopene + 2 quinol (overall reaction)
(1a) 9,9'-dicis-zeta-carotene + a quinone $\rightleftharpoons$ 7,9,9'-tricis-neurosporene + a quinol
(1b) 7,9,9'-tricis-neurosporene + a quinone $\rightleftharpoons$ 7,9,7',9'-tetracis-lycopene + a quinol

This enzyme is involved in carotenoid biosynthesis in plants and cyanobacteria.
