= Lycopene beta-cyclase =

Lycopene β-cyclase

Identifiers
- EC no.: 5.5.1.19
- CAS no.: 220801-82-1

Databases
- IntEnz: IntEnz view
- BRENDA: BRENDA entry
- ExPASy: NiceZyme view
- KEGG: KEGG entry
- MetaCyc: metabolic pathway
- PRIAM: profile
- PDB structures: RCSB PDB PDBe PDBsum
Search
- PMC: articles
- PubMed: articles
- NCBI: proteins

Lycopene β-cyclase (EC 5.5.1.19, CrtL, CrtL-b, CrtY) is an enzyme with systematic name carotenoid beta-end group lyase (decyclizing). This enzyme catalyses the following chemical reaction

carotenoid ψ-end group $\rightleftharpoons$ carotenoid β-end group

This enzyme requires NAD(P)H. It converts Lycopene (2 ψ ends) into β-carotene (2 β ends).
