= Phytofluene =

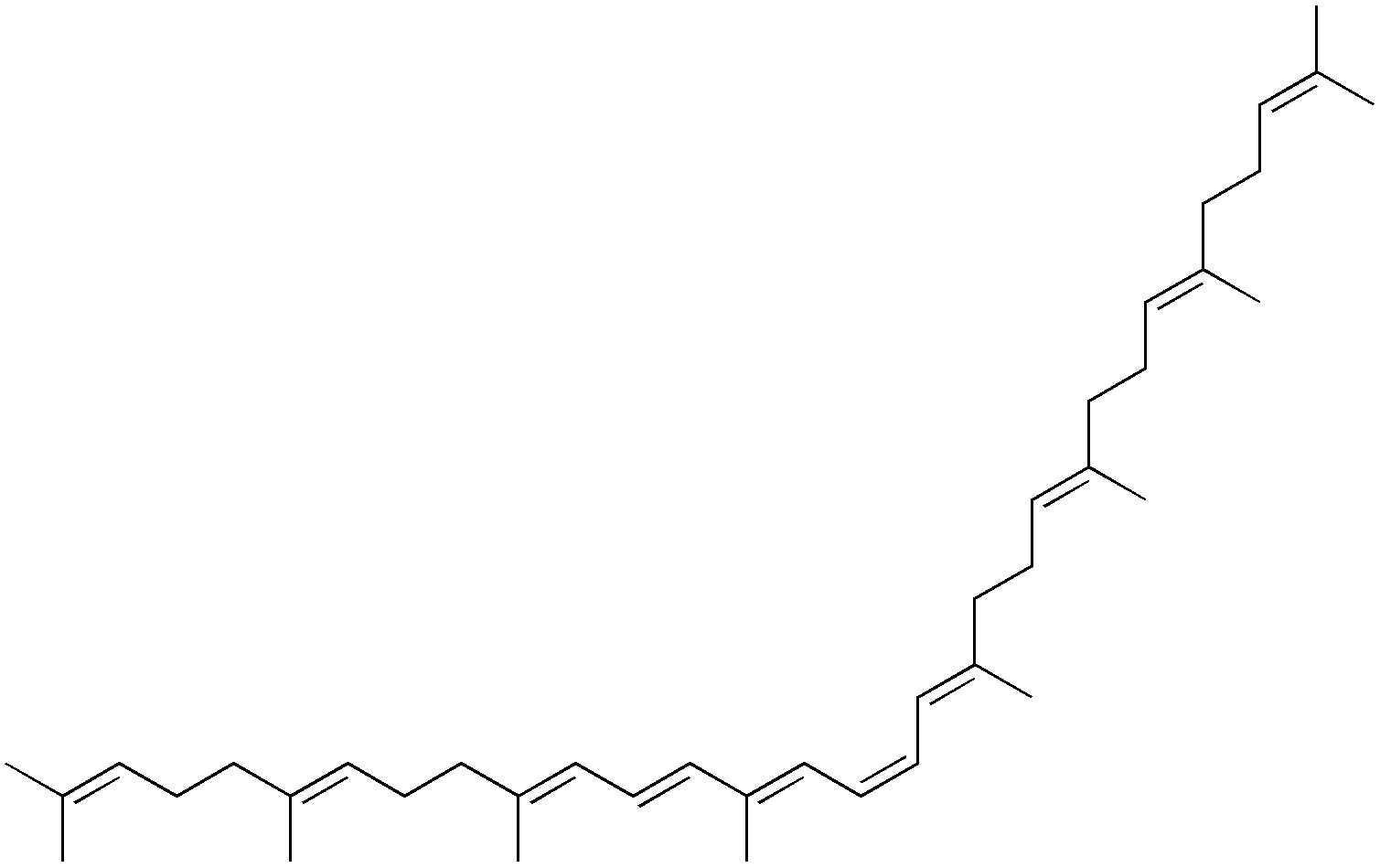
- Skeletal formula

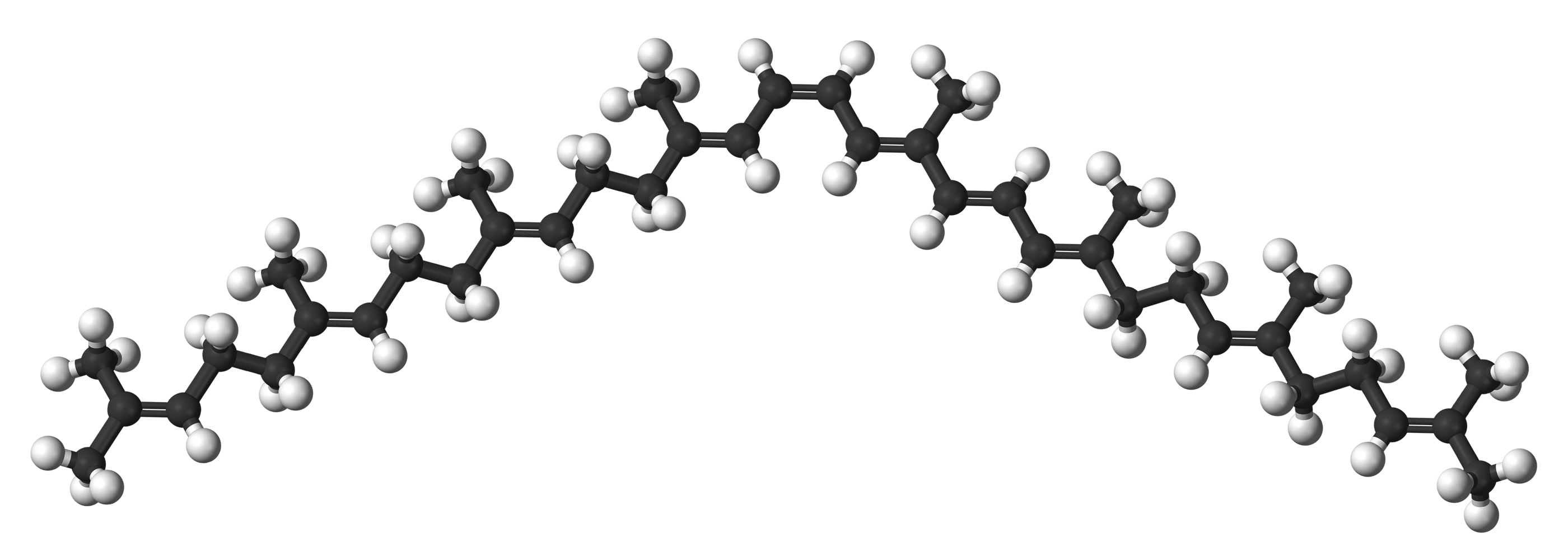
- Ball-and-stick model

Names
- IUPAC name 15-cis-7,8,11,12,7′,8′-Hexahydro-ψ,ψ-carotene
- Systematic IUPAC name (6E,10E,12E,14E,16Z,18E,22E,26E)-2,6,10,14,19,23,27,31-Octamethyldotriaconta-2,6,10,12,14,16,18,22,26,30-decaene
- Other names 15-cis-Phytofluene

Identifiers
CAS Number	27664-65-9
3D model (JSmol)	Interactive image
ChEBI	CHEBI:35165
ChemSpider	5256893
PubChem CID	6857557
UNII	3V8034L59C
CompTox Dashboard (EPA)	DTXSID40904730
- InChI: InChI=1S/C40H62/c1-33(2)19-13-23-37(7)27-17-31-39(9)29-15-25-35(5)21-11-12-22-36(6)26-16-30-40(10)32-18-28-38(8)24-14-20-34(3)4/h11-12,15,19-22,25,27-30H,13-14,16-18,23-24,26,31-32H2,1-10H3/b12-11-,25-15+,35-21+,36-22+,37-27+,38-28+,39-29+,40-30+ Key: OVSVTCFNLSGAMM-DGFSHVNOSA-N
- SMILES: CC(=CCC/C(=C/CC/C(=C/CC/C(=C/C=C\C=C(/C)\C=C\C=C(/C)\CC\C=C(/C)\CCC=C(C)C)/C)/C)/C)C

Properties
Chemical formula	C_{40}H_{62}
Molar mass	542.936 g·mol^{−1}
Appearance	Viscous orange oil
Boiling point	140 to 185 °C (284 to 365 °F; 413 to 458 K) at 0.0001 mmHg
Solubility in water	Insoluble
- Except where otherwise noted, data are given for materials in their standard state (at 25 °C [77 °F], 100 kPa). verify (what is ?) Infobox references

Phytofluene is a colorless carotenoid found naturally in tomatoes and other vegetables. It is the second product of carotenoid biosynthesis. It is formed from phytoene in a desaturation reaction leading to the formation of five conjugated double bonds. In the following step, addition of carbon-carbon conjugated double bonds leads to the formation of z-carotene and appearance of visible color.

Phytofluene has an absorption spectra in the UVA range, with maximal absorption at 348 nm and with ε1% of 1557.

Analysis of several fruits and vegetables showed that phytoene and phytofluene are found in majority of fruits and vegetables. In contrast to all other carotenoids, phytoene and phytofluene, the first carotenoid precursors in the biosynthetic pathway of other carotenoids absorb light in the UV range.

Dietary phytoene and phytofluene are accumulated in human skin. The accumulation of these carotenoids may protect the skin by several mechanisms: acting as UV absorbers, as antioxidants, as anti-inflammatory agents.
