= Ζ-Carotene =

ζ-Carotene

Names
- IUPAC name 7,7′,8,8′-Tetrahydro-ψ,ψ-carotene
- Systematic IUPAC name (6E,10E,12E,14E,16E,18E,20E,22E,26E)-2,6,10,14,19,23,27,31-Octamethyldotriaconta-2,6,10,12,14,16,18,20,22,26,30-undecaene

Identifiers
CAS Number	72746-33-9
3D model (JSmol)	Interactive image
ChEBI	CHEBI:28068
ChemSpider	4444346
PubChem CID	5280788
UNII	341QZ5N3E6
CompTox Dashboard (EPA)	DTXSID701318417
- InChI: InChI=1S/C40H60/c1-33(2)19-13-23-37(7)27-17-31-39(9)29-15-25-35(5)21-11-12-22-36(6)26-16-30-40(10)32-18-28-38(8)24-14-20-34(3)4/h11-12,15-16,19-22,25-30H,13-14,17-18,23-24,31-32H2,1-10H3/b12-11+,25-15+,26-16+,35-21+,36-22+,37-27+,38-28+,39-29+,40-30+ Key: BIWLELKAFXRPDE-WTXAYMOSSA-N; InChI=1/C40H60/c1-33(2)19-13-23-37(7)27-17-31-39(9)29-15-25-35(5)21-11-12-22-36(6)26-16-30-40(10)32-18-28-38(8)24-14-20-34(3)4/h11-12,15-16,19-22,25-30H,13-14,17-18,23-24,31-32H2,1-10H3/b12-11+,25-15+,26-16+,35-21+,36-22+,37-27+,38-28+,39-29+,40-30+ Key: BIWLELKAFXRPDE-WTXAYMOSBK
- SMILES: C(=C/C=C/C(=C/C=C/C=C(/C=C/C=C(\C)CC\C=C(/C)CC\C=C(/C)C)C)C)(\CC/C=C(/CC/C=C(\C)C)C)C

Properties
Chemical formula	C_{40}H_{60}
Molar mass	540.920 g·mol^{−1}
- Except where otherwise noted, data are given for materials in their standard state (at 25 °C [77 °F], 100 kPa). Infobox references

ζ-Carotene (zeta-carotene) is a carotenoid. It is different from α-carotene and β-carotene because it is acyclic. ζ-Carotene is similar in structure to lycopene, but has an additional 4 hydrogen atoms. ζ-carotene can be used as an intermediate in forming β-carotene. A dehydrogenation reaction converts ζ-carotene into lycopene, which then can be transformed into β-carotene through the action of lycopene beta-cyclase. ζ-Carotene is a natural product found in Lonicera japonica and Rhodospirillum rubrum.

== Biosynthesis and role ==
ζ-carotene is formed in plants as an intermediate in the carotenoid biosynthetic pathway. It is produced through sequential desaturation of phytoene by phytoene desaturase and ζ-carotene desaturase enzymes ζ-Carotene occupies a key position in the pathway, serving as a precursor to lycopene, which is further converted into essential carotenoids such as β-carotene. These downstream carotenoids are vital for plant functions, including photosynthesis, photoprotection, and hormone synthesis. Thus, ζ-carotene plays an important regulatory and biosynthetic role in plant metabolism.

== Research and applications ==
Zeta-carotene has gained attention in plant biotechnology due to its role as an intermediate in carotenoid biosynthesis. Advances in synthetic biology have enabled targeted manipulation of carotenoid pathways, with zeta-carotene serving as a key point for regulating the production of downstream compounds such as lycopene and β-carotene. These strategies aim to optimize carotenoid composition in plants to enhance nutritional value, improve stress tolerance, and increase pigment content for industrial uses. As such, zeta-carotene has become an important focus in efforts to engineer plant metabolism for agricultural and commercial benefits.
