= Neurosporene =

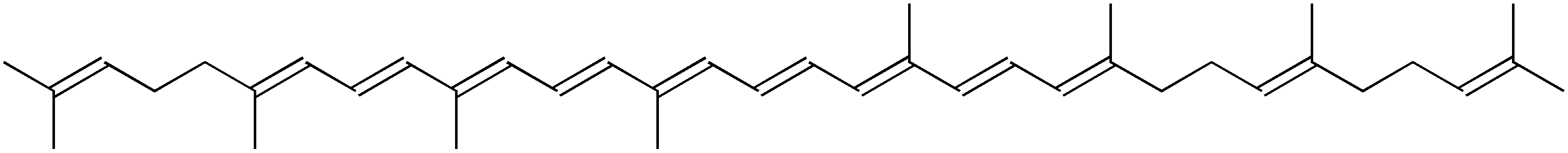

Names
- IUPAC name 7,8-Dihydro-ψ,ψ-carotene
- Systematic IUPAC name (6E,8E,10E,12E,14E,16E,18E,20E,22E,26E)-2,6,10,14,19,23,27,31-Octamethyldotriaconta-2,6,8,10,12,14,16,18,20,22,26,30-dodecaene

Identifiers
CAS Number	502-64-7
3D model (JSmol)	Interactive image
ChEBI	CHEBI:16833
ChemSpider	4444347
PubChem CID	5280789
UNII	FVN22YW634
CompTox Dashboard (EPA)	DTXSID901045315
- InChI: InChI=1S/C40H58/c1-33(2)19-13-23-37(7)27-17-31-39(9)29-15-25-35(5)21-11-12-22-36(6)26-16-30-40(10)32-18-28-38(8)24-14-20-34(3)4/h11-12,15-17,19-22,25-31H,13-14,18,23-24,32H2,1-10H3/b12-11+,25-15+,26-16+,31-17+,35-21+,36-22+,37-27+,38-28+,39-29+,40-30+ Key: ATCICVFRSJQYDV-XILUKMICSA-N; InChI=1/C40H58/c1-33(2)19-13-23-37(7)27-17-31-39(9)29-15-25-35(5)21-11-12-22-36(6)26-16-30-40(10)32-18-28-38(8)24-14-20-34(3)4/h11-12,15-17,19-22,25-31H,13-14,18,23-24,32H2,1-10H3/b12-11+,25-15+,26-16+,31-17+,35-21+,36-22+,37-27+,38-28+,39-29+,40-30+ Key: ATCICVFRSJQYDV-XILUKMICBV
- SMILES: CC(=CCC/C(=C/CC/C(=C/C=C/C(=C/C=C/C=C(\C)/C=C/C=C(\C)/C=C/C=C(\C)/CCC=C(C)C)/C)/C)/C)C

Properties
Chemical formula	C_{40}H_{58}
Molar mass	538.904 g·mol^{−1}
- Except where otherwise noted, data are given for materials in their standard state (at 25 °C [77 °F], 100 kPa). Infobox references

Neurosporene is a carotenoid pigment. It is an intermediate in the biosynthesis of lycopene and a variety of bacterial carotenoids.
