= Phytoene =

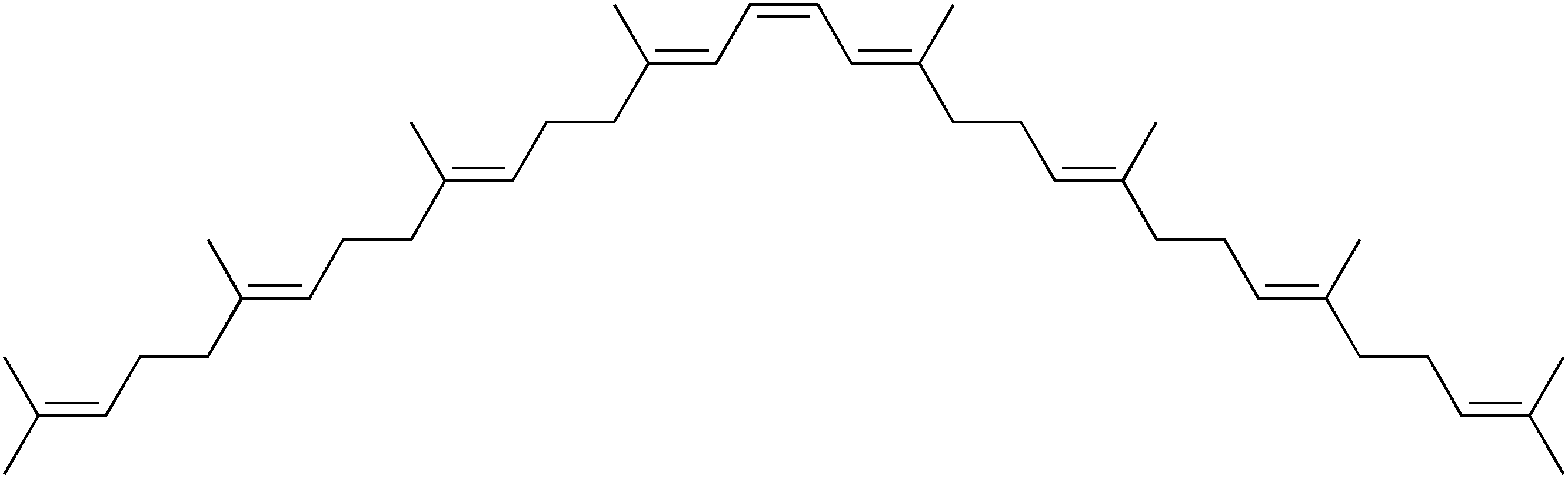
- Skeletal formula

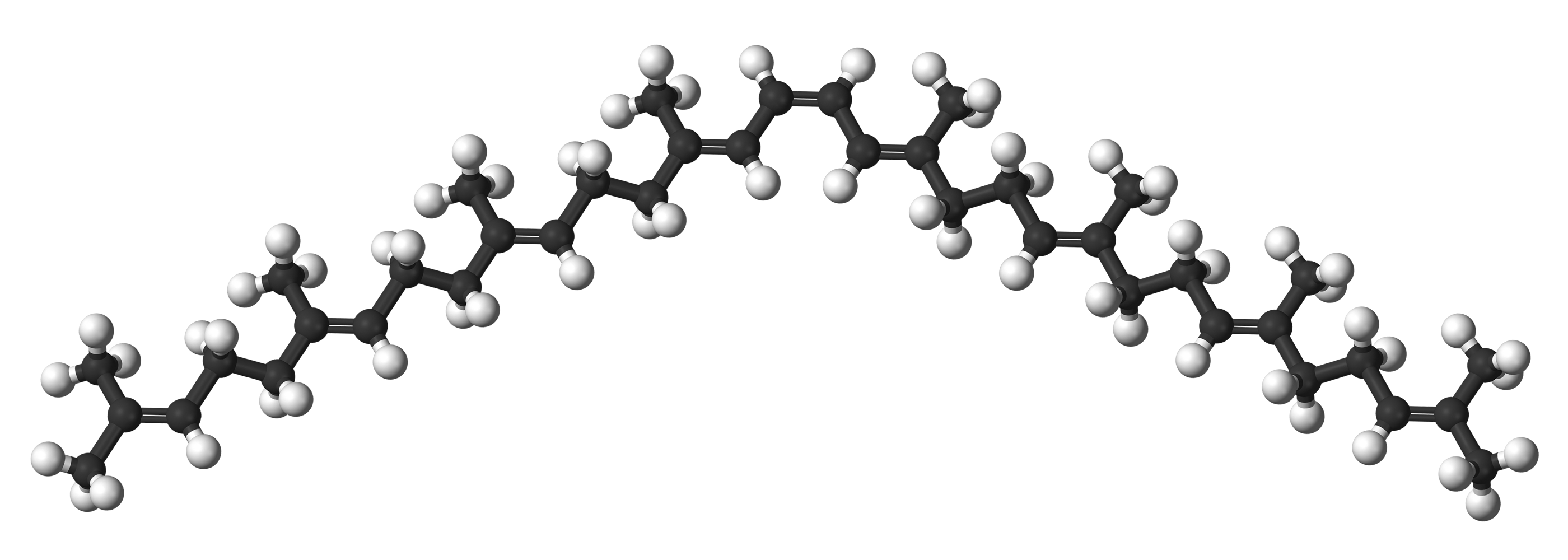
- Ball-and-stick model

Names
- IUPAC name 15-cis-7,8,11,12,7′,8′,11′,12′-Octahydro-ψ,ψ-carotene
- Systematic IUPAC name (6E,10E,14E,16Z,18E,22E,26E)-2,6,10,14,19,23,27,31-Octamethyldotriaconta-2,6,10,14,16,18,22,26,30-nonaene
- Other names 15-cis-Phytoene

Identifiers
CAS Number	13920-14-4
3D model (JSmol)	Interactive image
ChEBI	CHEBI:27787
ChemSpider	8138988
KEGG	C05421
PubChem CID	9963391
UNII	876K2ZK1OF
CompTox Dashboard (EPA)	DTXSID10433340
- InChI: InChI=1S/C40H64/c1-33(2)19-13-23-37(7)27-17-31-39(9)29-15-25-35(5)21-11-12-22-36(6)26-16-30-40(10)32-18-28-38(8)24-14-20-34(3)4/h11-12,19-22,27-30H,13-18,23-26,31-32H2,1-10H3/b12-11-,35-21+,36-22+,37-27+,38-28+,39-29+,40-30+ Key: YVLPJIGOMTXXLP-BHLJUDRVSA-N
- SMILES: CC(=CCC/C(=C/CC/C(=C/CC/C(=C/C=C\C=C(/C)\CC/C=C(\C)/CC/C=C(\C)/CCC=C(C)C)/C)/C)/C)C

Properties
Chemical formula	C_{40}H_{64}
Molar mass	544.952 g·mol^{−1}
- Except where otherwise noted, data are given for materials in their standard state (at 25 °C [77 °F], 100 kPa). verify (what is ?) Infobox references

Phytoene (/ˈfaɪtoʊiːn/) is a 40-carbon intermediate in the biosynthesis of carotenoids. The synthesis of phytoene is the first committed step in the synthesis of carotenoids in plants. Phytoene is produced from two molecules of geranylgeranyl pyrophosphate (GGPP) by the action of the enzyme phytoene synthase. The two GGPP molecules are condensed together followed by removal of diphosphate and proton shift leading to the formation of phytoene.

Dietary phytoene and phytofluene are found in a number of human tissues including the liver, lung, breast, prostate, colon, and skin. Accumulation of these carotenoids in the skin may protect the skin by several mechanisms: acting as UV absorbers, as antioxidants, and as anti-inflammatory agents.

== Structure ==
Phytoene is a symmetric molecule containing three conjugated double bonds. Phytoene has a UV-Vis absorption spectrum typical for a triply conjugated system with its main absorption maximum in the UVB range at 286 nm and with ε1% of 915.

== Sources ==
Analysis of several fruits and vegetables showed that phytoene and phytofluene are found in majority of fruits and vegetables. In contrast to all other carotenoids, phytoene and phytofluene, the first carotenoid precursors in the biosynthetic pathway of other carotenoids, absorb light in the UV range.

== History ==
The structure of phytoene was established and proven by total synthesis, by the Basil Weedon group in 1966.
