= List of compounds with carbon numbers 40–49 =

This is a partial list of molecules that contain 40 to 49 carbon atoms.

== C_{40}–C_{43} ==
Chemical formula	Synonyms	CAS number
C_{40}H_{24}	tetranaphthylene	116204-83-2
C_{40}H_{26}	1,3,6,8-Tetraphenylpyrene	13638-82-9
C_{40}H_{44}N_{4}O_{16}	uroporphyrinogen III	1976-85-8
C_{40}H_{46}N_{4}O_{17}	hydroxymethylbilane	73023-76-4
C_{40}H_{48}	isorenieratene	524-01-6
C_{40}H_{49}ClN_{8}O_{12}	microsclerodermin D	206535-30-0
C_{40}H_{50}	tetracyclohexylpyrene	
C_{40}H_{50}O	tedaniaxanthin	63893-29-8
C_{40}H_{50}O_{2}	rhodoxanthin	116-30-3
C_{40}H_{52}O_{2}	canthaxanthin	514-78-3
C_{40}H_{52}O_{3}	flavoxanthin	512-29-8
C_{40}H_{52}O_{4}	Astaxanthin	472-61-7
C_{40}H_{54}	torulene	
C_{40}H_{54}O_{3}	diadinoxanthin	18457-54-0
C_{40}H_{54}O_{4}	halocynthiaxanthin	81306-52-7
C_{40}H_{56}	β-carotene	7235-40-7
C_{40}H_{56}O	Cyptoxanthin	472-70-8
C_{40}H_{56}O_{2}	zeaxanthin	144-68-3
C_{40}H_{56}O_{3}	antheraxanthin and flavoxanthin	-
C_{40}H_{56}O_{4}	violaxanthin	126-29-4
C_{40}H_{58}O	rhodopin	105-92-0
C_{40}H_{58}O_{2}	cucumariaxanthin B	167818-24-8
C_{40}H_{58}O_{4}	oryzanol A	21238-33-5
C_{40}H_{60}	zeta-Carotene	
C_{40}H_{60}O_{2}	cucumariaxanthin C	167818-25-9
C_{40}H_{62}	phytofluene	27664-65-9
C_{40}H_{62}O	phytofluenol	29753-46-6
C_{40}H_{64}	phytoene	
C_{40}H_{64}O_{12}	nonactin	6833-84-7
C_{40}H_{66}	lycopersene	502-62-5
C_{40}H_{68}O_{11}	nigericin	28380-24-7
C_{40}H_{70}O_{14}	halityloside B	102075-01-5
C_{40}H_{78}O_{4}	dioctadecyl succinate	26720-12-7
C_{40}H_{78}O_{5}	diethylene glycol distearate	109-30-8
C_{40}H_{80}	cyclotetracontane	297-54-1
C_{40}H_{80}O_{2}	docosyl stearate	22413-03-2
C_{40}H_{80}NO_{8}P	lecithin	8002-43-5
C_{40}H_{82}	tetracontane	4181-95-7
C_{40}H_{84}NBr	tetrakis(decyl)ammonium bromide	14937-42-9
C_{40}H_{87}NSi_{2}	dioctadecyl tetramethylsilaxane	82356-82-9
C_{40}H_{90}O_{13}Ti_{4}	decabutoxytetratitanoxane	7393-48-8
C_{41}H_{42}N_{4}O_{8}	verteporfin	129497-78-5
C_{41}H_{60}N_{8}O_{10}	nodularin	118399-22-7
C_{41}H_{63}NO_{14}	protoveratrine a	1360-61-8
C_{41}H_{63}NO_{15}	protoveratrine b	124-97-0
C_{41}H_{64}O_{13}	digitoxin	71-63-6
C_{41}H_{67}NO_{15}	troleandomycin	2751-09-9
C_{41}H_{70}O_{9}Ca	ionomycin	56092-81-0
C_{41}H_{72}O_{2}	cholesteryl myristate	1989-52-2
C_{41}H_{74}N_{7}O_{17}P_{3}S	phytanoyl-CoA	146622-45-9
C_{41}H_{76}N_{2}O_{15}	roxithromycin	80214-83-1
C_{41}H_{80}O_{4}	dioctadecyl gluatarate	26720-18-3
C_{41}H_{84}	hentetracontane	7194-87-8
C_{42}H_{28}O	tetraphenylnaphthacene monoxide	127257-80-1
C_{42}H_{28}O_{2}	pseudooxytetraphenyl naphthacene	38118-83-1
C_{42}H_{51}N_{6}NiO_{13}	cofactor F430	73145-13-8
C_{42}H_{53}NO_{15}	aclarubicin	57576-44-0
C_{42}H_{58}O_{5}	dinoxanthin	54369-12-9
C_{42}H_{58}O_{6}	fucoxanthin	3351-86-8
C_{42}H_{62}O_{16}	glycyrrhizin	1405-68-3
C_{42}H_{69}NO_{15}	josamycin	16846-24-5
C_{42}H_{70}O_{11}	salinomycin	53003-10-4
C_{42}H_{71}NO_{14}	rokitamycin	74014-51-0
C_{42}H_{78}N_{2}O_{14}	dirithromycin	62013-14-1
C_{42}H_{84}	cyclodotetracontane	297-58-5
C_{42}H_{84}N_{14}O_{36}S_{3}	streptomycin sulfate	3810-74-0
C_{42}H_{87}N	trimyristylamine	27911-72-4
C_{42}H_{87}Al	tritetradecylaluminium	1529-58-4
C_{42}H_{90}N_{2}Br_{2}	hexanediaminium dihexadecyl tetramethyl dichloride	15590-96-2
C_{43}H_{51}N_{3}O_{11}	rifaximin	80521-81-4
C_{43}H_{53}NO_{14}	docetaxel	114977-28-5
C_{43}H_{54}N_{4}O_{8}	vinorelbine	71486-22-1
C_{43}H_{55}N_{5}O_{7}	vindesine	59917-39-4
C_{43}H_{58}N_{4}O_{12}	rifampcin	13292-46
C_{43}H_{65}N_{11}O_{12}S_{2}	demoxytocin	113-78-0
C_{43}H_{66}N_{12}O_{12}S_{2}	oxytocin	50-56-6
C_{43}H_{67}N_{15}O_{12}S_{2}	vasotocin	113-80-4
C_{43}H_{68}ClNO_{11}	pimecrolimus	137071-32-0
C_{43}H_{72}O_{11}	narasin	55134-13-9
C_{43}H_{74}N_{2}O_{14}	spiramycin	8025-81-8
C_{43}H_{76}O_{2}	cholesteryl palmitate	601-34-3
C_{43}H_{88}	tritetracontane	7098-21-7

== C_{44}–C_{46} ==
C_{44}H_{30}N_{4}	tetraphenylporphyrin	917-23-7
C_{44}H_{30}N_{4}O_{12}S_{4}	tetraphenylporphine sulfonate	
C_{44}H_{32}N_{4}O_{4}	temoporfin	122341-38-2
C_{44}H_{50}Cl_{2}N_{6}O_{2}	XF-73	718638-68-7
C_{44}H_{57}NO_{17}	ortataxel	186348-23-2
C_{44}H_{69}NO_{12}	tacrolimus	104987-11-3
C_{44}H_{82}O_{13}	sucrose dipalmitate	248917-86-4
C_{44}H_{86}PNO_{8}	stearoyloleoylglycerophosphatidylcholine	6753-56-6
C_{45}H_{44}N_{3}NaO_{7}S_{2}	coomassie brilliant blue	6104-59-2
C_{45}H_{52}N_{4}O_{18}	bilirubin diglucuronide	17459-92-6
C_{45}H_{54}N_{4}O_{8}	vinorelbine	71486-22-1
C_{45}H_{54}F_{2}N_{4}O_{8}	vinflunine	162652-95-1
C_{45}H_{57}NO_{14}	cabazitaxel	183133-96-2
C_{45}H_{57}NO_{16}	larotaxel	156294-36-9
C_{45}H_{64}O	2-Isopentenyl-3,4-dehydrorhodopin	
C_{45}H_{69}N_{5}O_{8}S	apratoxin A	350791-64-9
C_{45}H_{69}N_{11}O_{12}S	carbetocin	37025-55-1
C_{45}H_{73}NO_{14}	chaconine	20562-03-2
C_{45}H_{73}NO_{15}	solanine	20562-02-1
C_{45}H_{74}O	solanesol	13190-97-1
C_{45}H_{75}NO_{15}	miocamycin	55881-07-7
C_{45}H_{78}O_{2}	cholesteryl oleate	303-43-5
C_{45}H_{80}O_{2}	cholesteryl stearate	1184-05-0
C_{45}H_{80}O_{2}	cholesteryl stearate	35602-69-8
C_{45}H_{83}NO_{9}	ophidiacerebroside A	152247-26-2
C_{45}H_{86}O_{6}	trimyristin	555-45-3
C_{45}H_{90}	cyclopentatetracontane	297-60-9
C_{46}H_{56}N_{4}O_{10}	vincristine	57-22-7
C_{46}H_{58}N_{4}O_{9}	vinblastine	865-21-4
C_{46}H_{60}FN_{3}O_{13}	tesetaxel	333754-36-2
C_{46}H_{62}N_{4}O_{11}	rifabutin	72559-06-9
C_{46}H_{71}BrN_{10}O_{13}	symplocamide A	1007391-44-7
C_{46}H_{77}NO_{17}	tylosin	1401-69-0
C_{46}H_{80}O_{3}	cholesteryl oleyl carbonate	17110-51-9
C_{46}H_{82}O_{2}	cholesteryl nonadecanoate	25605-90-7
C_{46}H_{85}NO_{9}	ophidiacerebroside B	152247-27-3
C_{46}H_{94}	hexatetracontane	7098-24-0

== C_{47}–C_{49} ==
C_{47}H_{51}NO_{14}	paclitaxel	33069-62-4
C_{47}H_{64}N_{4}O_{12}	rifapentine	61379-65-5
C_{47}H_{73}NO_{17}	amphotericin B	1397-89-3
C_{47}H_{75}NO_{17}	nystatin	1400-61-9
C_{47}H_{84}O_{2}	cholesteryl eicosanoate	2573-03-7
C_{48}H_{40}O_{4}Si_{4}	octaphenylcyclotetrasiloxane	546-56-5
C_{48}H_{89}NO_{9}	ophidiacerebroside D	152247-28-4
C_{48}H_{94}O_{4}	didocosyl succinate	13475-47-3
C_{48}H_{96}	cyclooctatetracontane	36355-90-5
C_{48}H_{99}N	trihexadecylamine	28947-77-5
C_{48}H_{100}ClP	hexyl tris(tetradecyl)phosphonium chloride	
C_{49}H_{64}N_{10}O_{11}S_{2}	octreotate	
C_{49}H_{66}N_{10}O_{10}S_{2}	octreotide	83150-76-9
C_{49}H_{71}N_{7}O_{17}	cilofungin	79404-91-4
C_{49}H_{74}N_{10}O_{12}	microcystin-LR	101043-37-2
C_{49}H_{80}O_{2}	cholesteryladrenate	14940-92-2
C_{49}H_{96}O_{4}	didocosyl glutarate	94278-09-8
C_{49}H_{97}NO_{10}	agelasphin-11	152139-44-1

== See also ==
- Carbon number
