= C40H56O4 =

The molecular formula C_{40}H_{56}O_{4} (molar mass: 600.85 g/mol, exact mass: 600.4179 u) may refer to:

- Capsorubin
- Neoxanthin
- Violaxanthin
