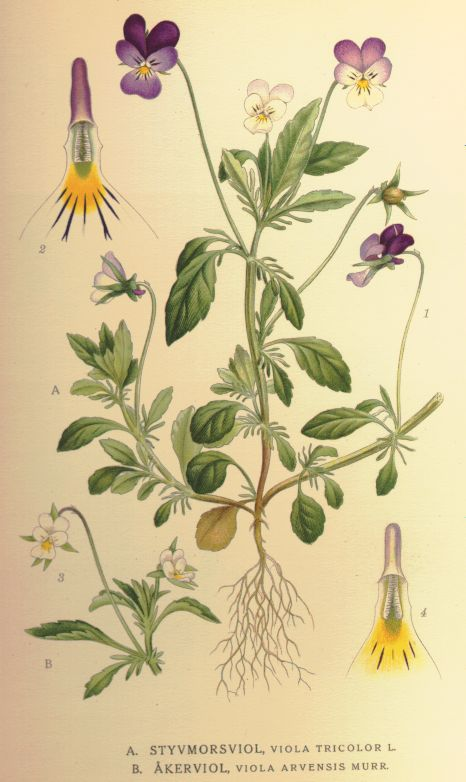

Scientific classification
- Kingdom: Plantae
- Clade: Tracheophytes
- Clade: Angiosperms
- Clade: Eudicots
- Clade: Rosids
- Order: Malpighiales
- Family: Violaceae
- Genus: Viola
- Species: V. tricolor

Binomial name
- Viola tricolor L.

= Viola tricolor =

Species of flowering plant

Viola tricolor is a common European wild flower, growing as an annual or short-lived perennial. The species is also known as wild pansy, Johnny Jump up (though this name is also applied to similar species such as the yellow pansy), heartsease, heart's ease, heart's delight, tickle-my-fancy, Jack-jump-up-and-kiss-me, come-and-cuddle-me, three faces in a hood, love-in-idleness, and pink of my john.

The flowers can be purple, blue, yellow or white. It is the progenitor of the cultivated pansy, hence the common name.

== Description ==
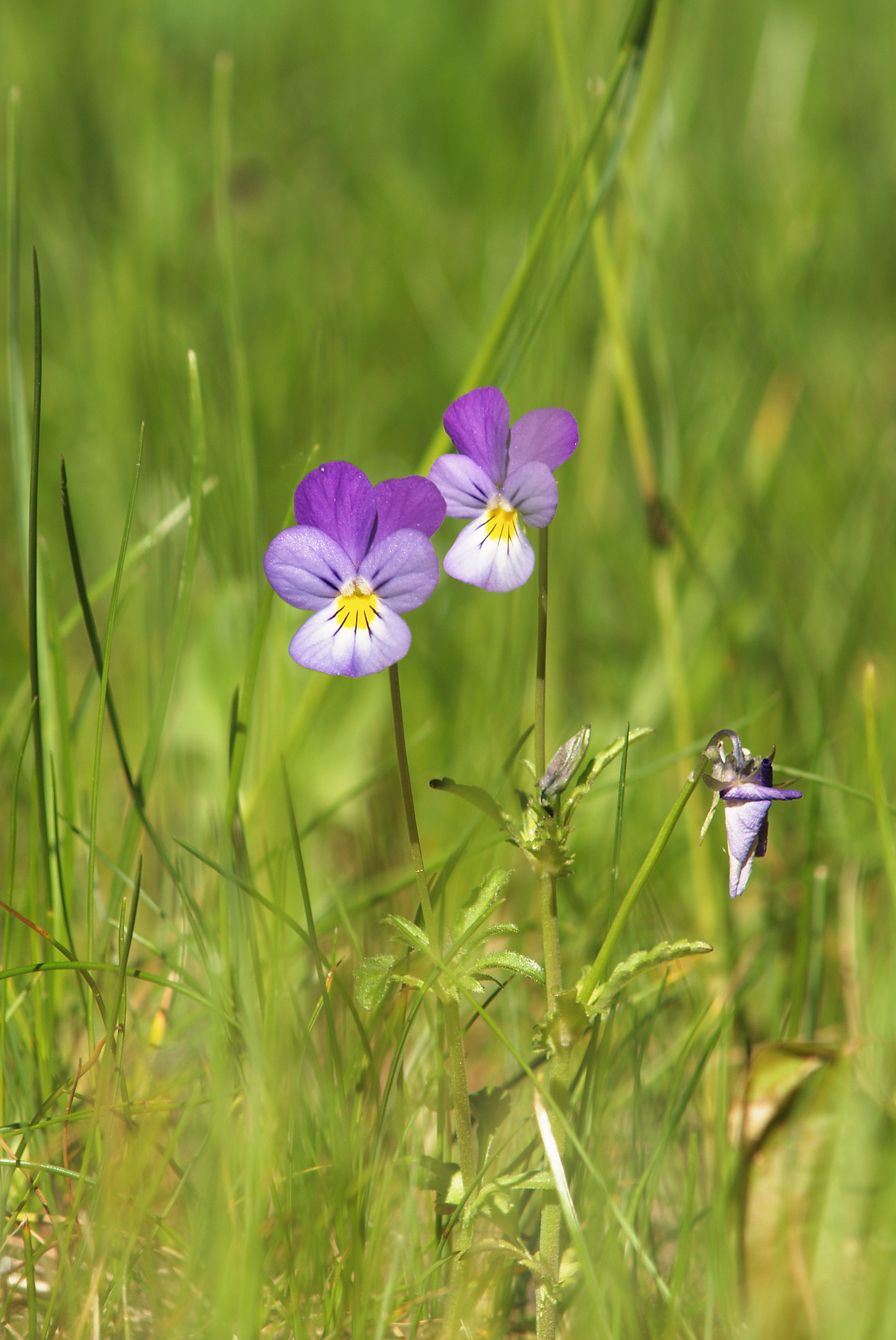
Flowers of Viola tricolor

Viola tricolor is a small plant of creeping and ramping (Note: It can hoist itself as much as a meter (3 ft) into a dense tangle of other growth.) habit, reaching at most 15 centimetres (6 in) in height, with flowers about 1.5 cm (1/2 in) in diameter. Its root is of the rhizome type with fine rootlets. The stem (acoli stem: which remains flush with the soil and from which leave the leaves and the flowering stalk) is hairless, sometimes downy and is branched. The plant has no leaf rosette at the base, unlike some other violets, such as Viola hirta. Leaves are, on the contrary, alternate. They are stalked at limbus oval, oblong or lanceolate and more or less serrated margins. The stipules are often quite developed, at least those of the upper leaves. These stipules are palm-lined or palmatised.

It flowers from April to September (in the Northern Hemisphere). The plants are hermaphroditic and self-fertile, pollinated by bees. The flowers are solitary and lateral, hoisted on long peduncles. They appear on aerial stems with more or less long internodes. The sepals are never larger than the corolla. It is 10 to 25 millimetres (3/8 to 1 in) long. This corolla can be purple, blue, yellow or white. It can most often be two-tone, yellow and purple. The tricolor shape, yellow, white and purple, is the most sought after. Up to 50 seeds can be produced at a time.

== Distribution and habitat ==
It is common almost everywhere on the Eurasian continent, near the sea or inland, at altitudes ranging from 0 to 2,700 metres (8,900 ft). It grows in open grasslands, wastelands, mainly on acidic or neutral soils and usually in partial shade. It is also found on the banks and in the alluviums.

It has been introduced into North America, where it has spread.

== Ecology ==
In Iceland, Viola tricolor is known to be a host for at least two species of plant pathogenic fungi, Pleospora herbarum and Ramularia agrestis.

== Uses ==
As an ornamental and medicinal plant, the wild pansy has been cultivated since the Middle Ages and bred in Britain since 1810. As some of its names imply, V. tricolor and other plants in the Viola genus (such as V. odorata, or sweet violet), have a long history of use in herbalism and folk medicine, particularly Iranian, Greco-Arab, Ayurvedic and Unani traditional health systems. Traditionally, it has been used to treat cardiovascular conditions, epilepsy, skin diseases, burns and eczema, and as an expectorant for respiratory problems such as bronchitis, asthma, and cold symptoms, and modern research has begun to corroborate these traditionally held knowledges and uses.

Studies have shown V. tricolor extract has antinociceptive, immunosuppressant and anti-inflammatory properties, making it a potential treatment for autoimmune disorders. The extract is known to be antimicrobial, sedative, antiepileptic, and diuretic, as well as potentially antiviral and antiprotozoal. V. tricolor L extract has shown vasorelaxant, cardio-relaxant, hypotensive, and cardio protective effects. Some studies have discovered potential anti-cancer properties, where the extract (primarily the ethyl acetate component) has been attributed to induced apoptosis and inhibited angiogenesis in cancer cells. The seeds and roots, and to a lesser extent the flowers and stems, are also a known emetic and purgative/laxative, and should be used with caution.

The ancient Chinese used the plant as medicine, and the Celts and Romans made perfumes of them.

The flowers have also been used to make yellow, green and blue-green dyes, while the leaves can be used to indicate acidity.

=== Biochemistry ===
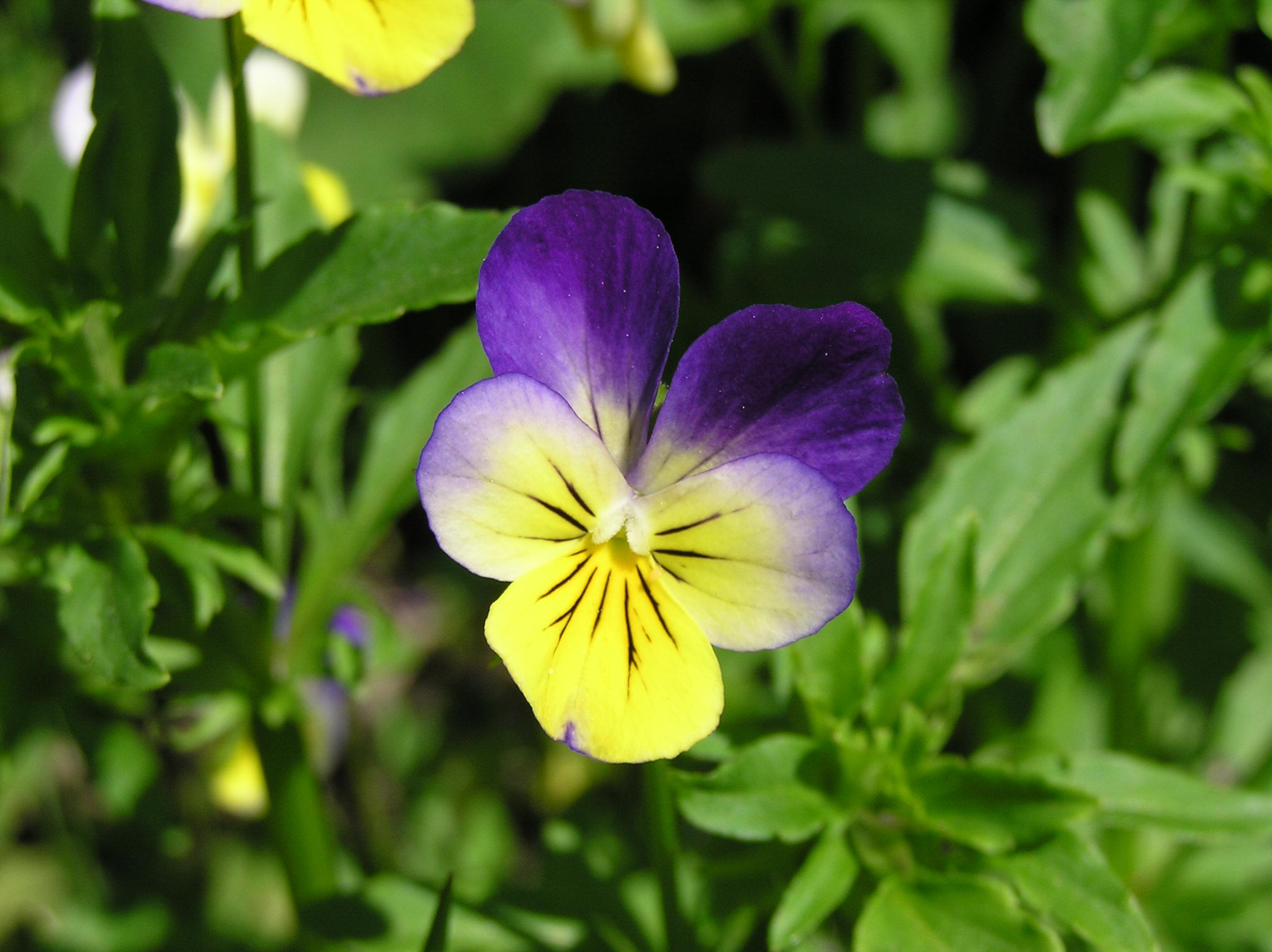
Flower

The plant, especially the flowers, contains antioxidants, has low toxicity, and is edible.

V. tricolor leaves, stems, roots and flowers have been found to contain antioxidants and flavonoids (including violenthin, violaquercitrin, quercetin, luteolin, and rutin), amino acids, chlorogenic acids, salicylates, as well as alkaloids, volatile oils, mucilage gums, resin, saponins, and vitamins A and C. Various carotenoids have also been isolated from the drug, including violaxanthin, antheraxanthin, lutein, zeaxanthin and beta-Carotene.

The fresh plant Viola declinata and V. tricolor contains approximately:

- saponins (4.40%),
- mucilages (10.26%),
- total carotenoids (8.45 mg/100g vegetal product, expressed in β-carotene).

Its 10 percent mucilages consist of glucose, galactose, arabinose and rhamnose, as well as tannins, salicylic acid, and its derivatives.

Anthocyanidins and coumarins, such as umbelliferone, were also detected in V. tricolor.

Extracts from the plant are anti-microbial.

Heartsease contains compounds, including colorless crystalline compounds, proven to be useful in prophylaxis and treatment of some medical conditions (see Traditional and Medicinal Uses section), such as cardiovascular problems, complications of diabetes, inflammations, immune disorders, and liver problems, among other indications.

Heartsease plants contain aglycones apigenin, chrysoeriol, isorhamnetin, kaempferol. V. tricolor is one of many viola plant species containing cyclotides. These small peptides have proven to be useful in drug development due to their size and structure giving rise to high stability. Many cyclotides found in V. tricolor are cytotoxic. This feature means it could be used to treat cancers.

== In culture ==
According to Roman mythology, the wild pansy turned into the Love-in-idleness as Cupid shot one of his arrows at the imperial votaress, but missed and instead struck it. As Cupid is the god of desire, affection and erotic love, the flower's juice received the trait, to act as a love potion. Its name relates to the use of the flower, as it is often used for idleness or vileness acts.

According to Greek mythology, Zeus fell in love with a young woman named Io and provoked jealousy to his wife Hera. He transformed the girl into a heifer and kept her grazing at his feet. For pity on the diet of herbs to which he submitted the beloved, he caused the earth to produce beautiful flowers that he called Io. Another Greek legend has it that the delicate white flowers were worshiped by Eros. To inhibit this worship, Aphrodite colored them, which resulted in tricolor coloration.

No. 1 of 3 Lyrics, H. 161, written for piano in 1921 by British composer Frank Bridge, is called "Heart's Ease".

=== Literature ===
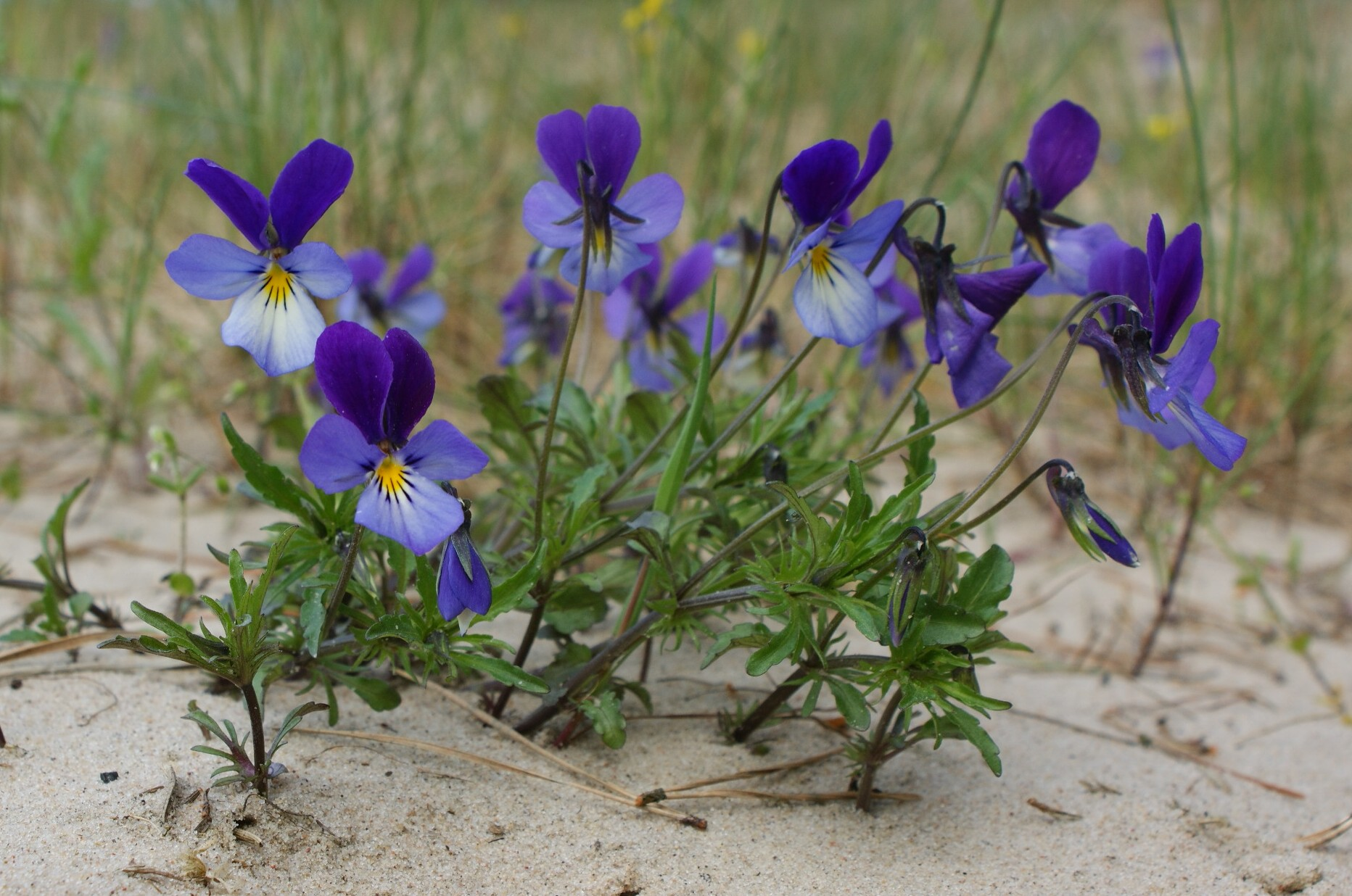
On a dry grassland

Long before cultivated pansies were released into the trade in 1839, V. tricolor was associated with thought in the "language of flowers", often by its alternative name of pansy (from the French pensée, "thought"): hence Ophelia's often quoted line in Shakespeare's Hamlet, "There's pansies, that's for thoughts". (What Shakespeare had in mind was V. tricolor, the wild pansy, not a modern garden pansy.)

=== A Midsummer Night's Dream ===
Shakespeare makes a more direct reference, probably to V. tricolor (Note: The other candidate is "Love-in-a-Mist" or Nigella, a common garden plant of Shakespeare's day, varying in colour from white through pinks to an almost true blue.) in A Midsummer Night's Dream. Oberon sends Puck to gather "a little western flower that maidens call love-in-idleness". Oberon's account is that he diverted an arrow from Cupid's bow aimed at "a fair vestal, throned by the west" (supposedly Queen Elizabeth I) to fall upon the plant "before milk-white, now purple with love's wound". The "imperial vot'ress" passes on "fancy-free", destined never to fall in love.

In Act II and III, Oberon's and Puck's intervention with the magic love potion of the flower, they can control the fates of various characters, but also speed up the process of falling in and out of love, so that the actual romances of the lovers and their love itself appears to become very comical. Shakespeare uses the flower to provide the essential dramatic and comical features for his play. Besides that the love potion gained from the flower, does not only interfere with the lovers' fates, but also gives the play structure as it affects the lovers' romances drastically, as it at first upsets the balance of love and creates asymmetrical love among the four Athenian lovers. The fact that this flower introduces magical love to this play creates the potential for many possible outcomes for this play.

The juice of the heartsease now, claims Oberon, "on sleeping eyelids laid, Will make or man or woman madly dote Upon the next live creature that it sees." Equipped with such powers, Oberon and Puck control the fates of various characters in the play to provide Shakespeare's essential dramatic and comic structure for the play.

Yet mark'd I where the bolt of Cupid fell:
It fell upon a little western flower,
Before, milk-white, now purple with love's wound,
And maidens call it love-in-idleness.

— A Midsummer Night's Dream (Act 2, Scene 1)

The love-in-idleness was originally a white flower, struck by one of Cupid's arrows, which turned it purple and gave it its magic love potion. When dripped onto someone's eyelids this love potion causes an individual to fall madly in love with the next person they see. In A Midsummer Night's Dream, William Shakespeare uses this flower as a plot device to introduce the comical disturbance and chaos of love, but also to highlight the irrationality of romantic love. Here love is depicted as a sort of benevolent affliction. Shakespeare presents love to be something contradicting to one's normal feelings and ideas. However he also depicts the fact that those can lead to foolish and hurtful things and present the idea that love can also end in tragedy. The play shows that love can be a source of comedy as easily as of tragedy and therefore show that the power that the love potion from the Love-in-idleness inherits is beyond the comprehension of the fairies and mortals. In the end, the love-in-idleness nectar is used to restore all romances in the play to their original states (including Demetrius's prior affections for Helena before he turned to Hermia.)

The effects of the love-in-idleness can be very dramatic and tragic, no matter if the intentions were right. The play reaches its point at which Demetrius and Lysander are trying to kill one another. Although Hermia and Helena are not trying to kill one another, they are suffering from the rejection of their lovers and from considerable verbal abuse. However, this still happens at a very comical level, for the lovers are not aware of their situation. The more they try to present the dramatic side of love, the hate, jealousy and anger, the less they become serious, and so their anger turns unreal. In the end, love is not denied and the lovers are reunited. Nevertheless, Shakespeare ends the lovers' story as a comedy, with the inclusion of several tragic and dramatic moments. This is supposed to show that love can be a source of comedy as easily as of tragedy, and therefore show that the power that the love potion from the love-in-idleness inherits is beyond the comprehension of fairies and mortals alike.

=== The Taming of the Shrew ===
Shakespeare mentions it in his play The Taming of the Shrew where Luciento claims he found the effect of love-in-idleness - alluding to its qualities to simulate the effects of love.

O Tranio! till I found it to be true,
I never thought it possible or likely;
But see, while idly I stood looking on,
I found the effect of love in idleness;
And now in plainness do confess to thee,
That art to me as secret and as dear
As Anna to the Queen of Carthage was,
Tranio, I burn, I pine, I perish, Tranio,
If I achieve not this young modest girl.

— The Taming of the Shrew (Act 1, Scene 1)

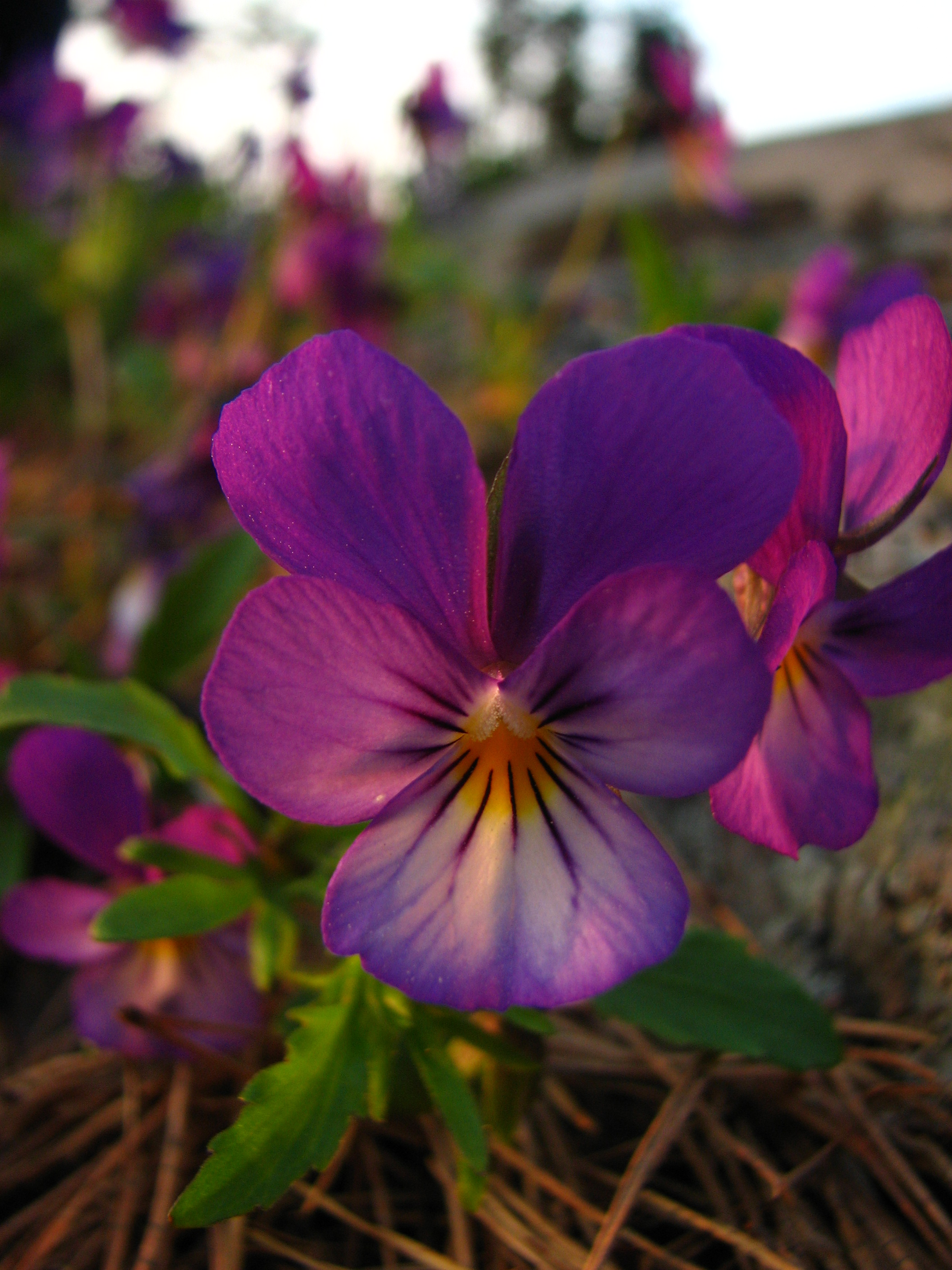
Purple flower

=== Balm in Gilead ===
In her poem Balm in Gilead, Christina Georgina Rossetti uses heartsease as a metaphor of growing older as her confidence and her vision increases. The heartsease is known as love-lies-bleeding which is a type of the inseparability of the pain of living and the love of Christ. The garden was adorned with the flower which served as the speaker's life. The "weed" represents the sins of the speaker's life. However at the end, the speaker pleads her pain and waits her judgment.

Heartsease I found, where Love-lies-bleeding

Empurpled all the ground:

Whatever flowers I missed unheeding,

Heartsease I found.

Yet still my garden mound

Stood sore in need of watering, weeding,

And binding growths unbound.

Ah, when shades fell to light succeeding

I scarcely dared look round:

'Love-lies-bleeding' was all my pleading,

Heartsease I found.

== See also ==
- Viola arvensis – species also sometimes called "heartsease"
- Viola lutea – species also sometimes called "heartsease"
- Viola ocellata – species also sometimes called "heartsease"
