= Viola hortensis =

Viola hortensis or Viola tricolor var. hortensis may refer to:

- Viola tricolor (synonyms: Viola tricolor var. hortensis DC., Viola hortensis (DC.) Rouy & Foucaud)
- Viola × wittrockiana (synonyms: Viola hortensis hort. ex Steud., Viola hortensis Wettst., Viola tricolor var. hortensis Groenland & Rümpler)
- Viola odorata (synonym: Viola hortensis Schur)
