= C40H56O3 =

The molecular formula C_{40}H_{56}O_{3} (molar mass: 584.57 g/mol, exact mass: 584.4229 u) may refer to:

- Antheraxanthin
- Capsanthin
- Flavoxanthin
