= NSY =

NSY may refer to:

- New Scotland Yard
- Naval Air Station Sigonella's IATA code
- Neoxanthin synthase, an enzyme
- North Sydney railway station's station code
