= VDE =

VDE may refer to:

== Science and technology ==
- Virtual Distributed Ethernet, a virtualised network infrastructure
- Violaxanthin de-epoxidase, an enzyme
- Visteon Dockable Entertainment, a portable DVD player with Game Boy Advance slot

== Other uses ==
- VDE e.V. (Verband der Elektrotechnik, Elektronik und Informationstechnik), a German technical association
- German Unification Transport Projects (German initials "VDE"), transportation infrastructure projects
