= Antheraxanthin =

Names
- IUPAC name (3S,5R,6S,3′R)-5,6-Epoxy-5,6-dihydro-β,β-carotene-3,3′-diol
- Systematic IUPAC name (1S,4S,6R)-4-Hydroxy-1-{(1E,3E,5E,7E,9E,11E,13E,15E,17E)-18-[(4R)-4-hydroxy-2,6,6-trimethylcyclohex-1-en-1-yl]-3,7,12,16-tetramethyloctadeca-1,3,5,7,9,11,13,15,17-nonaen-1-yl}-2,2,6-trimethyl-7-oxabicyclo[4.1.0]heptane

Identifiers
CAS Number	640-03-9 (all-trans); 68831-78-7 (9Z)
3D model (JSmol)	Interactive image
Beilstein Reference	101042
ChEBI	CHEBI:27867
ChemSpider	4444635
KEGG	C08579
PubChem CID	5281223
UNII	0306J2L3DV
CompTox Dashboard (EPA)	DTXSID601015587
- InChI: InChI=1S/C40H56O3/c1-29(17-13-19-31(3)21-22-36-33(5)25-34(41)26-37(36,6)7)15-11-12-16-30(2)18-14-20-32(4)23-24-40-38(8,9)27-35(42)28-39(40,10)43-40/h11-24,34-35,41-42H,25-28H2,1-10H3/b12-11+,17-13+,18-14+,22-21+,24-23+,29-15+,30-16+,31-19+,32-20+/t34-,35+,39-,40+/m1/s1 Key: OFNSUWBAQRCHAV-OYQUVCAXSA-N; InChI=1/C40H56O3/c1-29(17-13-19-31(3)21-22-36-33(5)25-34(41)26-37(36,6)7)15-11-12-16-30(2)18-14-20-32(4)23-24-40-38(8,9)27-35(42)28-39(40,10)43-40/h11-24,34-35,41-42H,25-28H2,1-10H3/b12-11+,17-13+,18-14+,22-21+,24-23+,29-15+,30-16+,31-19+,32-20+/t34-,35+,39-,40+/m1/s1 Key: OFNSUWBAQRCHAV-OYQUVCAXBE
- SMILES: O[C@H]1CC(C(=C(/C)C1)/C=C/C(=C/C=C/C(=C/C=C/C=C(/C=C/C=C(/C=C/[C@@]32O[C@@]3(C[C@@H](O)CC2(C)C)C)C)C)C)C)(C)C

Properties
Chemical formula	C_{40}H_{56}O_{3}
Molar mass	584.885 g·mol^{−1}
Appearance	Yellow solid
- Except where otherwise noted, data are given for materials in their standard state (at 25 °C [77 °F], 100 kPa). Infobox references

Antheraxanthin (from ánthos, Greek for "flower" and xanthos, Greek for "yellow") is a bright yellow accessory pigment found in many organisms that perform photosynthesis. It is a xanthophyll cycle pigment, an oil-soluble alcohol within the xanthophyll subgroup of carotenoids. Antheraxanthin is both a component in and product of the cellular photoprotection mechanisms in photosynthetic green algae, red algae, euglenoids, and plants.

== In the xanthophyll cycle ==
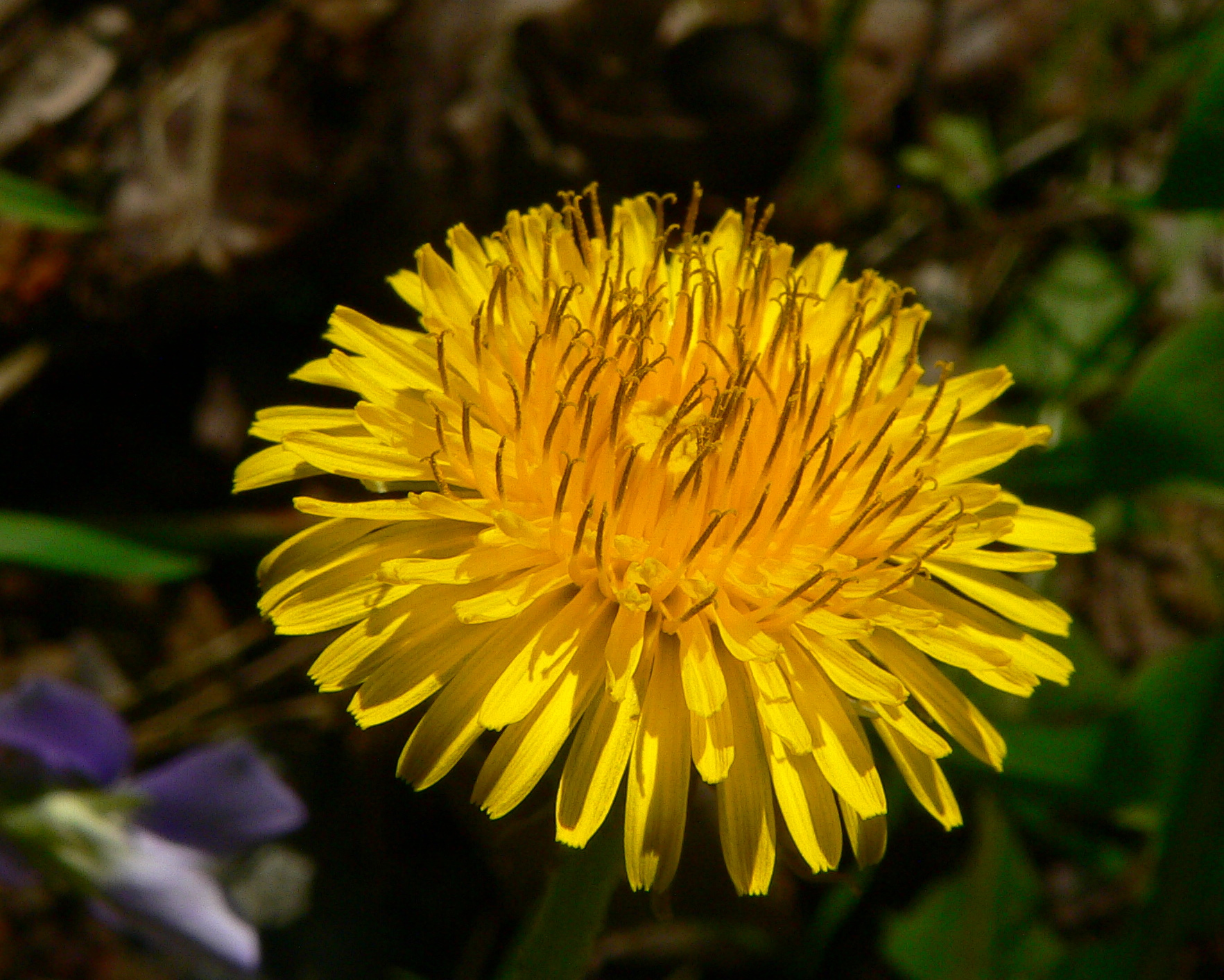
Antheraxanthin has been found in high levels in sun-exposed dandelions (Taraxacum officinale).

Antheraxanthin is an intermediate molecule of the xanthophyll cycle in most photosynthetic eukaryotes, namely plants, and some bacteria. In the xanthophyll cycle, specific carotenoid pigments are transformed via enzymatic reactions into either more or less photoprotective biological pigments.

A plant can increase its capacity for non-photochemical quenching (NPQ) and excess heat dissipation by converting the orange pigment violaxanthin to antheraxanthin and then to light-yellow pigment zeaxanthin. The xanthophyll pool, or total xanthophyll cycle pigment levels are sometimes abbreviated as "VAZ" in scientific literature.

"VAZ" is an abbreviation of the cycle's main pigments in order of lowest to highest photoprotection each pigment provides. Antheraxanthin is denoted by the "A" in the middle, between violaxanthin (V) and zeaxanthin (Z).

== Location in thylakoid membrane ==
The xanthophyll cycle takes place, along with other photopigment reactions, in the membranes of thylakoids within chloroplasts. Antheraxanthin provides more heat and light stability (via NPQ) to the thylakoid membranes than violaxanthin, but less than zeaxanthin.

Xanthophyll cycle reactions, where antheraxanthin is an intermediate stage, are usually responses to changes in light or radiation exposure, which cause changes in the internal pH of thylakoids. Lessening or heightening photoprotection through the xanthophyll cycle allows plants to regulate their own light uptake for photosynthesis.

The majority of chloroplasts are located in a plant's mesophyll tissue cells, just below the epidermis (surface) layer of leaves and stems. Since thylakoids are contained within chloroplasts, antheraxanthin and other photopigments are in their highest concentrations in the leaves of plants under high solar radiation or light/heat exposure.

A high-altitude study with dandelions (Taraxacum officinale) in the Andes Mountains found overall high rates of antheraxanthin accumulation in highly exposed leaves on a NW-facing slope at 1600 meter and even higher rates on a summit at 3600 meter.

== Enzymes and reactions ==
Antheraxanthin is a partially de-epoxidized (see de-epoxidation) form of violaxanthin. One of violaxanthin's two epoxide groups are removed from its chemical structure to generate antheraxanthin. For this reason, the xanthophyll cycle is sometimes called the violaxanthin cycle.

Violaxanthin de-epoxidase is an enzyme that reduces one epoxide group from violaxanthin into a double bond to create antheraxanthin. It also functions to create zeaxanthin, where it catalyses the reduction of two epoxide groups from violaxanthin.

Zeaxanthin epoxidase catalyses the attachment of one epoxide group to zeaxanthin to generate antheraxanthin, and two epoxide groups to generate violaxanthin.
