= Neoxanthin synthase =

Identifiers
- EC no.: 5.3.99.9

Databases
- IntEnz: IntEnz view
- BRENDA: BRENDA entry
- ExPASy: NiceZyme view
- KEGG: KEGG entry
- MetaCyc: metabolic pathway
- PRIAM: profile
- PDB structures: RCSB PDB PDBe PDBsum
Search
- PMC: articles
- PubMed: articles
- NCBI: proteins

In enzymology, a neoxanthin synthase (EC 5.3.99.9) is an enzyme that catalyzes the chemical reaction:

violaxanthin $\rightleftharpoons$ neoxanthin

Hence, this enzyme has one substrate, violaxanthin, and one product, neoxanthin.

This enzyme belongs to the family of isomerases, specifically a class of other intramolecular oxidoreductases. The systematic name of this enzyme class is violaxanthin---neoxanthin isomerase (epoxide-opening). This enzyme is also called NSY. This enzyme participates in carotenoid biosynthesis - general.
