= Violaxanthin de-epoxidase =

Identifiers
- EC no.: 1.10.99.3
- CAS no.: 57534-73-3

Databases
- IntEnz: IntEnz view
- BRENDA: BRENDA entry
- ExPASy: NiceZyme view
- KEGG: KEGG entry
- MetaCyc: metabolic pathway
- PRIAM: profile
- PDB structures: RCSB PDB PDBe PDBsum
Search
- PMC: articles
- PubMed: articles
- NCBI: proteins

Violaxanthin de-epoxidase (EC 1.10.99.3, VDE) is an enzyme with systematic name violaxanthin:ascorbate oxidoreductase. This enzyme catalyses the following chemical reaction

violaxanthin + 2 L-ascorbate $\rightleftharpoons$ zeaxanthin + 2 L-dehydroascorbate + 2 H_{2}O (overall reaction)
(1a) violaxanthin + L-ascorbate $\rightleftharpoons$ antheraxanthin + L-dehydroascorbate + H_{2}O
(1b) antheraxanthin + L-ascorbate $\rightleftharpoons$ zeaxanthin + L-dehydroascorbate + H_{2}O

Violaxanthin de-epoxidase is a part of the xanthophyll (or violaxanthin) cycle for controlling the concentration of zeaxanthin in chloroplasts.
