= Zeaxanthin epoxidase =

Class of enzymes

Identifiers
- EC no.: 1.14.15.21
- CAS no.: 149718-34-3

Databases
- IntEnz: IntEnz view
- BRENDA: BRENDA entry
- ExPASy: NiceZyme view
- KEGG: KEGG entry
- MetaCyc: metabolic pathway
- PRIAM: profile
- PDB structures: RCSB PDB PDBe PDBsum
Search
- PMC: articles
- PubMed: articles
- NCBI: proteins

Zeaxanthin epoxidase (EC 1.14.15.21, Zea-epoxidase) is an enzyme with systematic name zeaxanthin,NAD(P)H:oxygen oxidoreductase. This enzyme catalyses the following overall chemical reaction:

zeaxanthin
+ 4 reduced
ferredoxin
2 O_{2}
2 H_{2}O
violaxanthin
+ 4 oxidised
ferredoxin

Zeaxanthin epoxidase is a flavoprotein that uses flavin adenine dinucleotide as a cofactor. It is active under conditions of low light and protects plants from damage by excess light.
