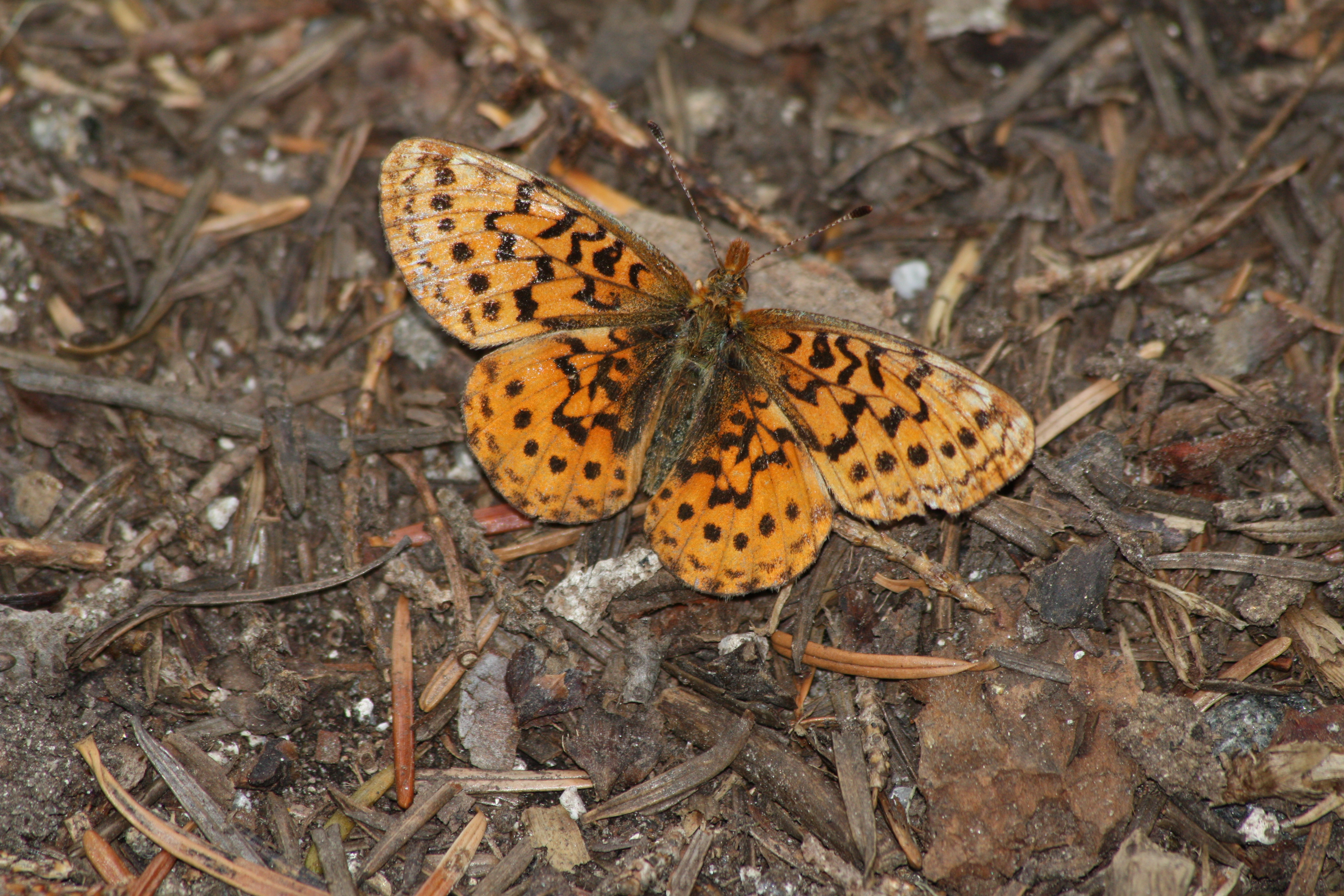

Scientific classification
- Domain: Eukaryota
- Kingdom: Animalia
- Phylum: Arthropoda
- Class: Insecta
- Order: Lepidoptera
- Family: Nymphalidae
- Genus: Boloria
- Species: B. epithore

Binomial name
- Boloria epithore (W.H. Edwards, 1864)

Synonyms
- Clossiana epithore; Brenthis epithore

= Boloria epithore =

Pacific fritillary

Species of butterfly

Boloria epithore, the Pacific fritillary, is a butterfly of the family Nymphalidae. It is found in western North America from California to British Columbia and Alberta.

The wingspan is 34–44 millimetres (1.3–1.7 in). The butterfly flies from June to July.

The larvae feed on Viola ocellata.

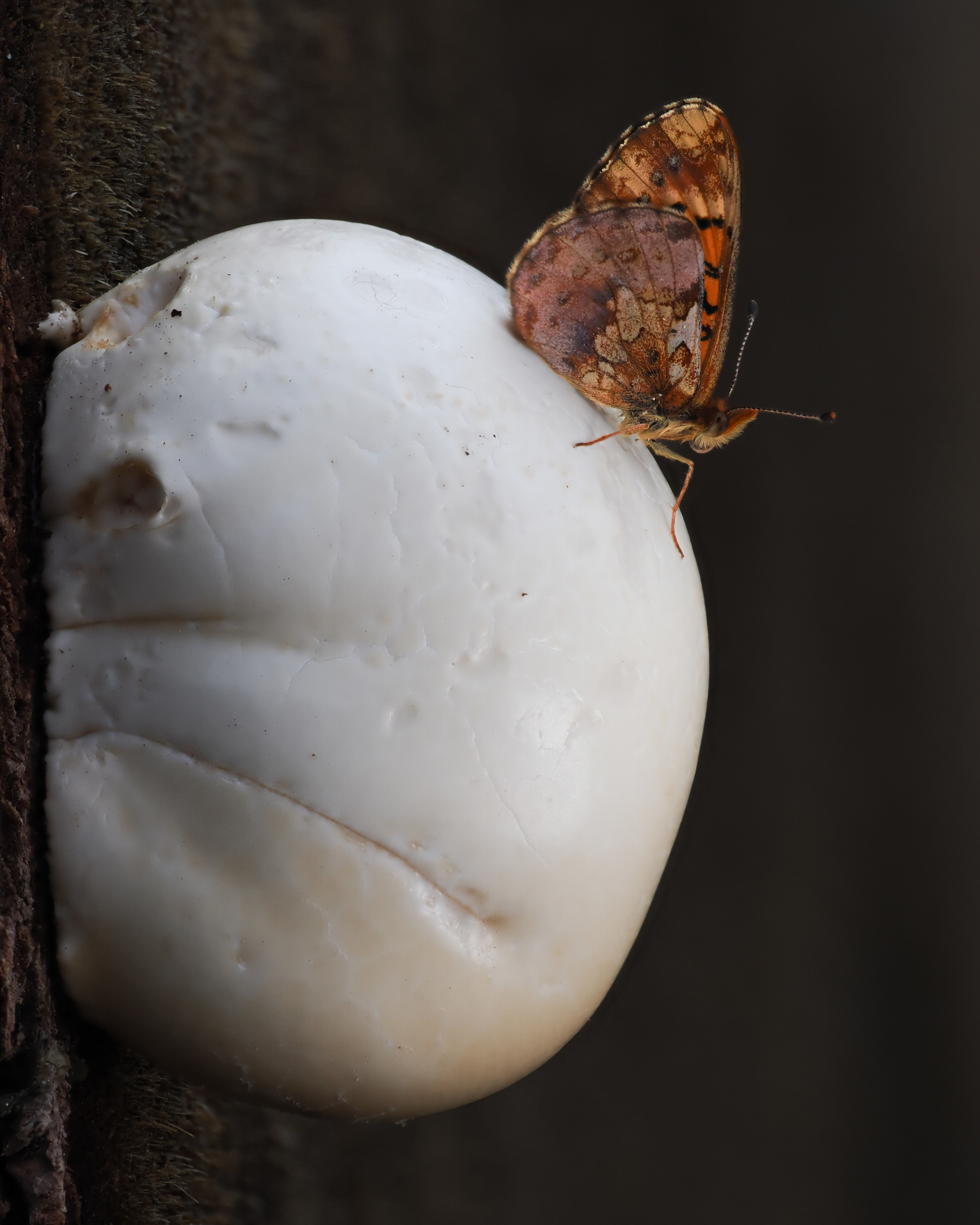
Boloria epithore on Cryptoporus volvatus

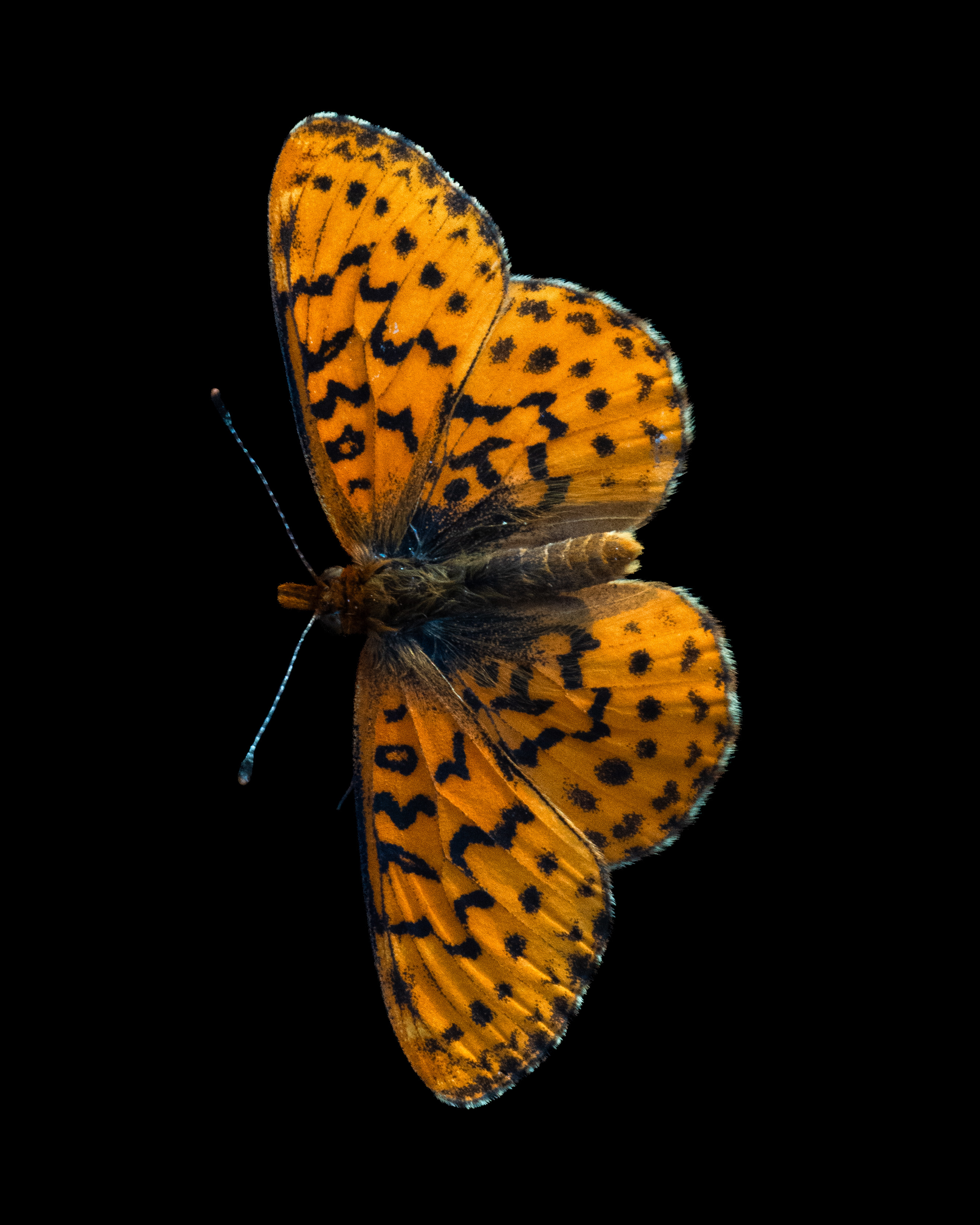
Boloria epithore

== Subspecies ==
The following subspecies are recognised:

- B. e. chermocki E.M. Perkins & S.F. Perkins, 1966 (Oregon)
- B. e. epithore (W.H. Edwards, 1864) (California)
- B. e. sierra E.M. Perkins, 1973 (California)
- B. e. uslui Koçak, 1984 (British Columbia)
