= Diadinoxanthin =

Names
- IUPAC name (3S,5R,6S,3′R)-5,6-Epoxy-7′,8′-didehydro-5,6-dihydro-β,β-carotene-3,3′-diol
- Systematic IUPAC name (1R,3S,6S)-6-{(1E,3E,5E,7E,9E,11E,13E,15E)-18-[(4R)-4-Hydroxy-2,6,6-trimethylcyclohex-1-en-1-yl]-3,7,12,16-tetramethyloctadeca-1,3,5,7,9,11,13,15-octaen-17-yn-1-yl}-1,5,5-trimethyl-7-oxabicyclo[4.1.0]heptan-3-ol

Identifiers
CAS Number	18457-54-0
3D model (JSmol)	Interactive image
ChemSpider	4952559
PubChem CID	6449888
CompTox Dashboard (EPA)	DTXSID301015588
- InChI: InChI=1S/C40H54O3/c1-29(17-13-19-31(3)21-22-36-33(5)25-34(41)26-37(36,6)7)15-11-12-16-30(2)18-14-20-32(4)23-24-40-38(8,9)27-35(42)28-39(40,10)43-40/h11-20,23-24,34-35,41-42H,25-28H2,1-10H3/b12-11+,17-13+,18-14+,24-23+,29-15+,30-16+,31-19+,32-20+/t34-,35+,39-,40+/m1/s1 Key: OGHZCSINIMWCSB-GHIQLMQGSA-N
- SMILES: CC1=C(C#C/C(C)=C/C=C/C(C)=C/C=C/C=C(C)/C=C/C=C(C)/C=C/[C@@]23O[C@]2(C)C[C@@H](O)CC3(C)C)C(C)(C)C[C@H](O)C1

Properties
Chemical formula	C_{40}H_{54}O_{3}
Molar mass	582.869 g·mol^{−1}
- Except where otherwise noted, data are given for materials in their standard state (at 25 °C [77 °F], 100 kPa). Infobox references

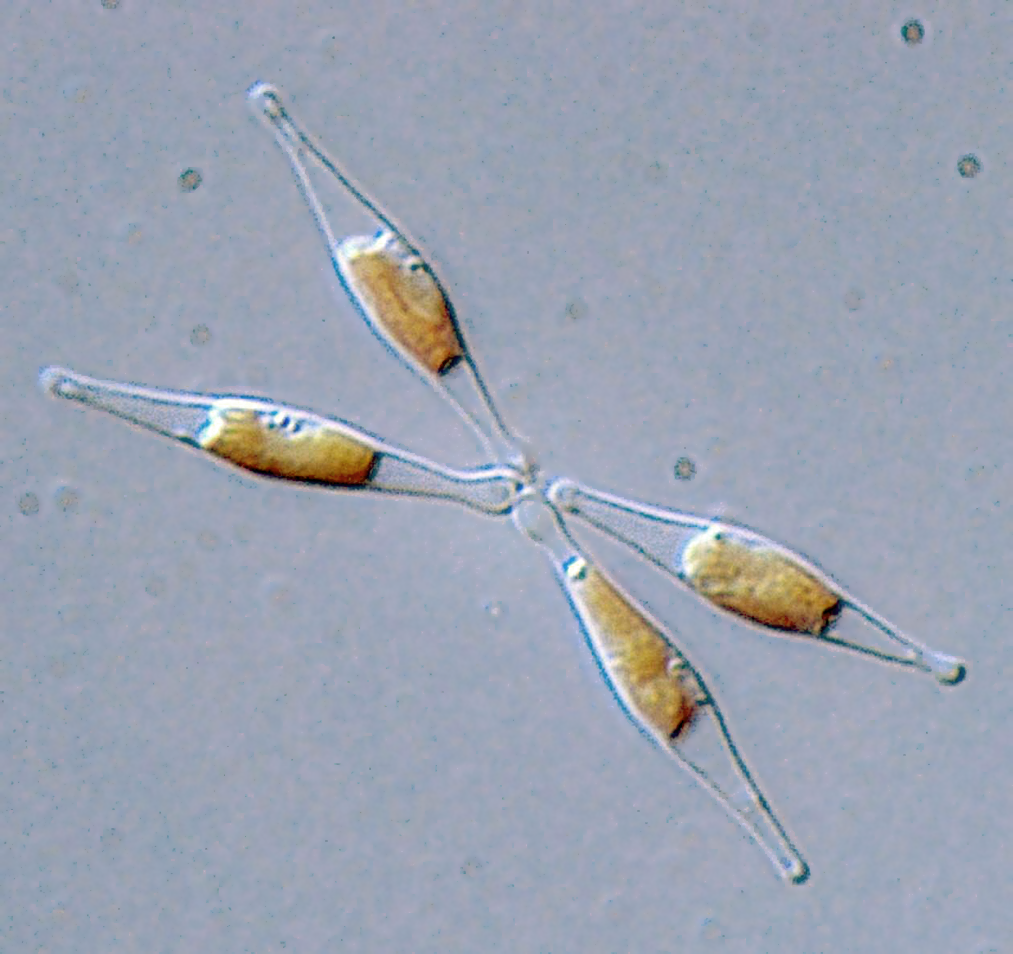
Diatoms, such as the diatom pictured here Phaeodactylum tricornutum, often contain diadinoxanthin pigments.

Diadinoxanthin is a pigment found in phytoplankton. It has the formula C_{40}H_{54}O_{3}. It gives rise to the xanthophylls diatoxanthin and dinoxanthin.

Diadinoxanthin is a plastid pigment. Plastid pigments include chlorophylls a and c, fucoxanthin, heteroxanthin, diatoxanthin, and diadinoxanthin.

Diadinoxanthin is a carotenoid. It is found in diatoms, along with other carotenoids like fucoxanthin and beta-carotene. Diatoms are referred to as golden-brown microalgae because of the color of their plastids and because the carotenoids mask chlorophyll-a and chlorophyll-c.

Diadinoxanthin is a xanthophyll. Xanthophyll pigments are photoprotective pigments that help protect cells from harmful effects of too much light energy (light saturation). It is present in cells along with diatoxanthin (another xanthophyll). Diadinoxanthin is stockpiled in the cell to become available when needed. Thus it is the inactive precursor of diatoxanthin, which is the active energy dissipator.

== See also ==
- Accessory pigment
- Algae
- Carotenoid
- Diatom
- Diatoxanthin
- Dinoxanthin
- Photoprotection
- Phytoplankton
- Xanthophyll
