= Diatoxanthin =

Names
- IUPAC name (3R,3′R)-7,8-Didehydro-β,β-carotene-3,3′-diol
- Systematic IUPAC name (1R,1′R)-4,4′-[(1E,3E,5E,7E,9E,11E,13E,15E)-3,7,12,16-Tetramethyloctadeca-1,3,5,7,9,11,13,15-octaen-17-yne-1,18-diyl]bis(3,5,5-trimethylcyclohex-3-en-1-ol)

Identifiers
CAS Number	31063-73-7
3D model (JSmol)	Interactive image
ChemSpider	4945217
PubChem CID	6440986
UNII	3VOI529I46
CompTox Dashboard (EPA)	DTXSID001015589
- InChI: InChI=1S/C40H54O2/c1-29(17-13-19-31(3)21-23-37-33(5)25-35(41)27-39(37,7)8)15-11-12-16-30(2)18-14-20-32(4)22-24-38-34(6)26-36(42)28-40(38,9)10/h11-21,23,35-36,41-42H,25-28H2,1-10H3/b12-11+,17-13+,18-14+,23-21+,29-15+,30-16+,31-19+,32-20+/t35-,36-/m1/s1 Key: HNYJHQMUSVNWPV-DRCJTWAYSA-N
- SMILES: O[C@@H]2C/C(=C(/C=C/C(=C/C=C/C(=C/C=C/C=C(/C=C/C=C(/C#C\C1=C(/C)C[C@@H](O)CC1(C)C)C)C)C)C)C(C)(C)C2)C

Properties
Chemical formula	C_{40}H_{54}O_{2}
Molar mass	566.870 g·mol^{−1}
Appearance	Yellow solid
Density	1.02 g/mL
Boiling point	708.3 °C (1,306.9 °F; 981.4 K)
- Except where otherwise noted, data are given for materials in their standard state (at 25 °C [77 °F], 100 kPa). Infobox references

Diatoxanthin is a type of xanthophyll found in phytoplankton and diatoms. It plays a vital role in photoprotection in diatoms, where the diadinoxanthin-diatoxanthin cycle is an important short-term photoprotective mechanism. Diatoxanthin has also been investigated for uses in treating breast cancer.
