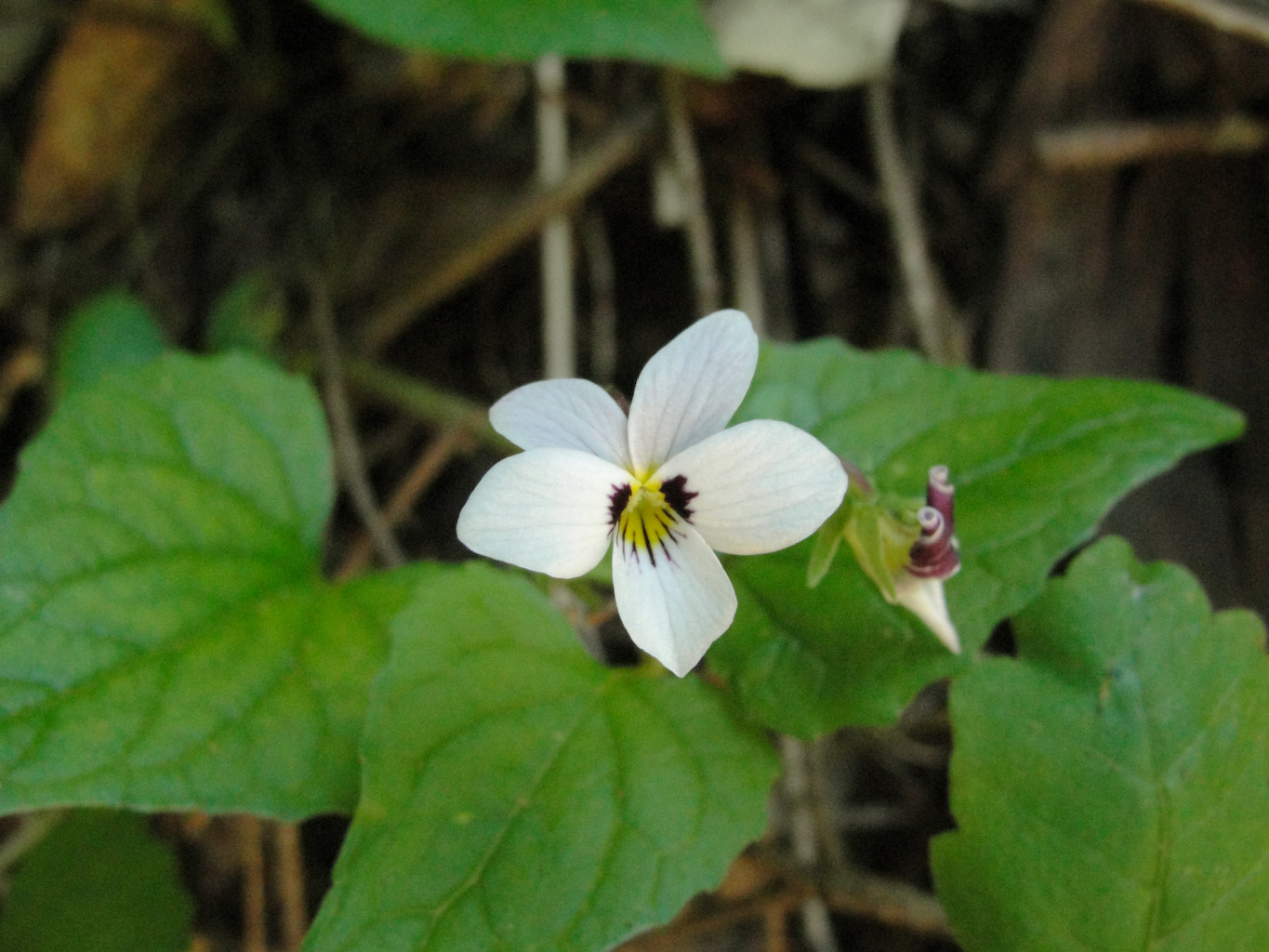

Conservation status
- Apparently Secure (NatureServe)

Scientific classification
- Kingdom: Plantae
- Clade: Embryophytes
- Clade: Tracheophytes
- Clade: Spermatophytes
- Clade: Angiosperms
- Clade: Eudicots
- Clade: Rosids
- Order: Malpighiales
- Family: Violaceae
- Genus: Viola
- Species: V. ocellata

Binomial name
- Viola ocellata Torr. & A.Gray

= Viola ocellata =

Species of flowering plant

Viola ocellata (Torr. & A. Gray) is a species of violet known by the common names pinto violet, two-eyed violet, and western heart's ease, identified by its two dark purple "eye" spots. It is native to southern Oregon and northern and central California, where it occurs in the coastal foothills and mountain ranges.

== Description ==
V. ocellata is a perennial herb that thrives in shaded woodland areas with moist, slightly acidic soil. It can tolerate harsh soil conditions, like nutrient deficiency and the presence of heavy metals. It is named for its characteristic two dark purple spots at the base of the two innermost petals, giving it the appearance of two eyes. It reproduces both by seeds and rhizomes, with new plants branching directly from the root system. It occupies a clade with two other species of violets and holds moderate ecological significance, being a primary food source for a small number of butterfly species.

== Habitat and distribution ==
V. ocellata is often found on rocky or grassy banks, thickets, and redwood or pine forests. It is known to tolerate soil conditions that impede most other plants, such as serpentine soils and quicksilver mines. Serpentine soils are characterized by high levels of heavy metals like nickel, cobalt, and chromium; while lacking nitrogen, phosphorus, potassium, sulfur, and other nutrients essential for plant growth. Serpentine soil is formed by the hydration of ultramafic rocks, which are found in tectonically active areas such as the Western Coast of North America. The California Region, the native range of V. ocellata, has the highest concentration of serpentine soil along the Pacific Coast.

== Morphology ==
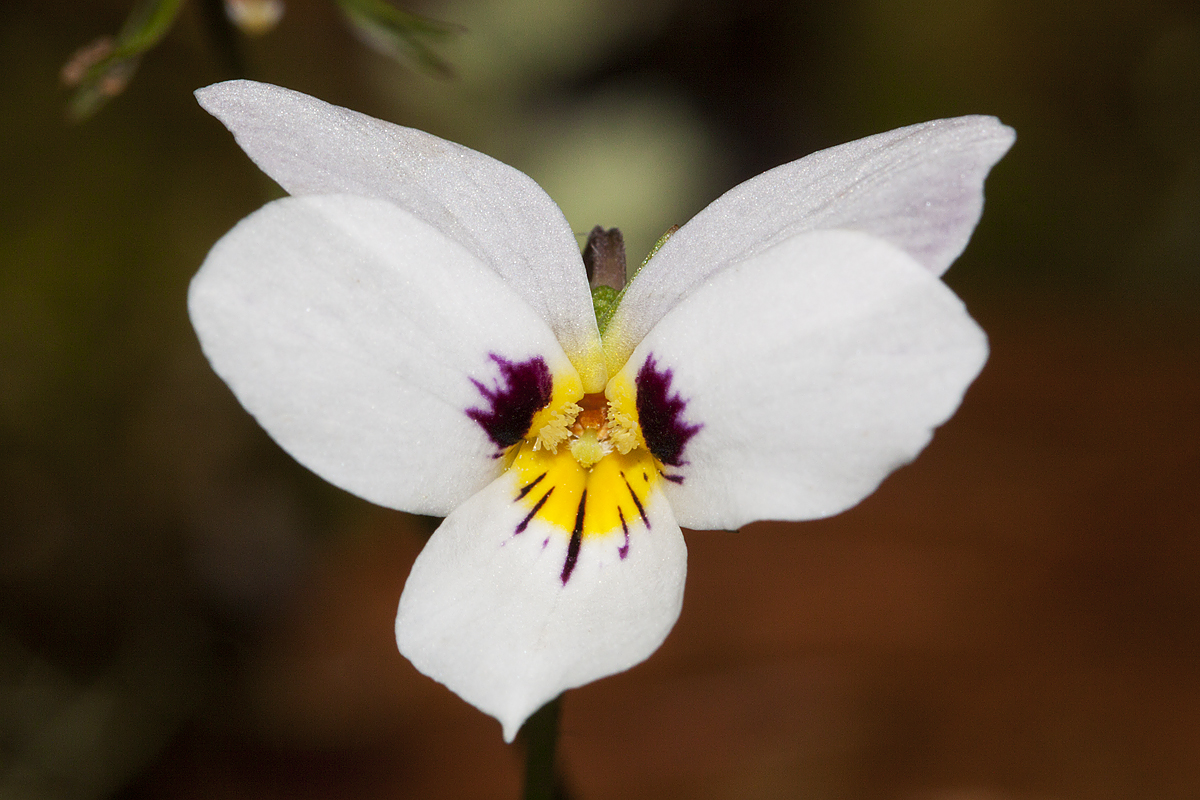
Viola ocellata — pinto violet, two-eyed violet, blooming on June 1, 2011, Portola Redwoods State Park, Santa Cruz Mountains, San Mateo County, California

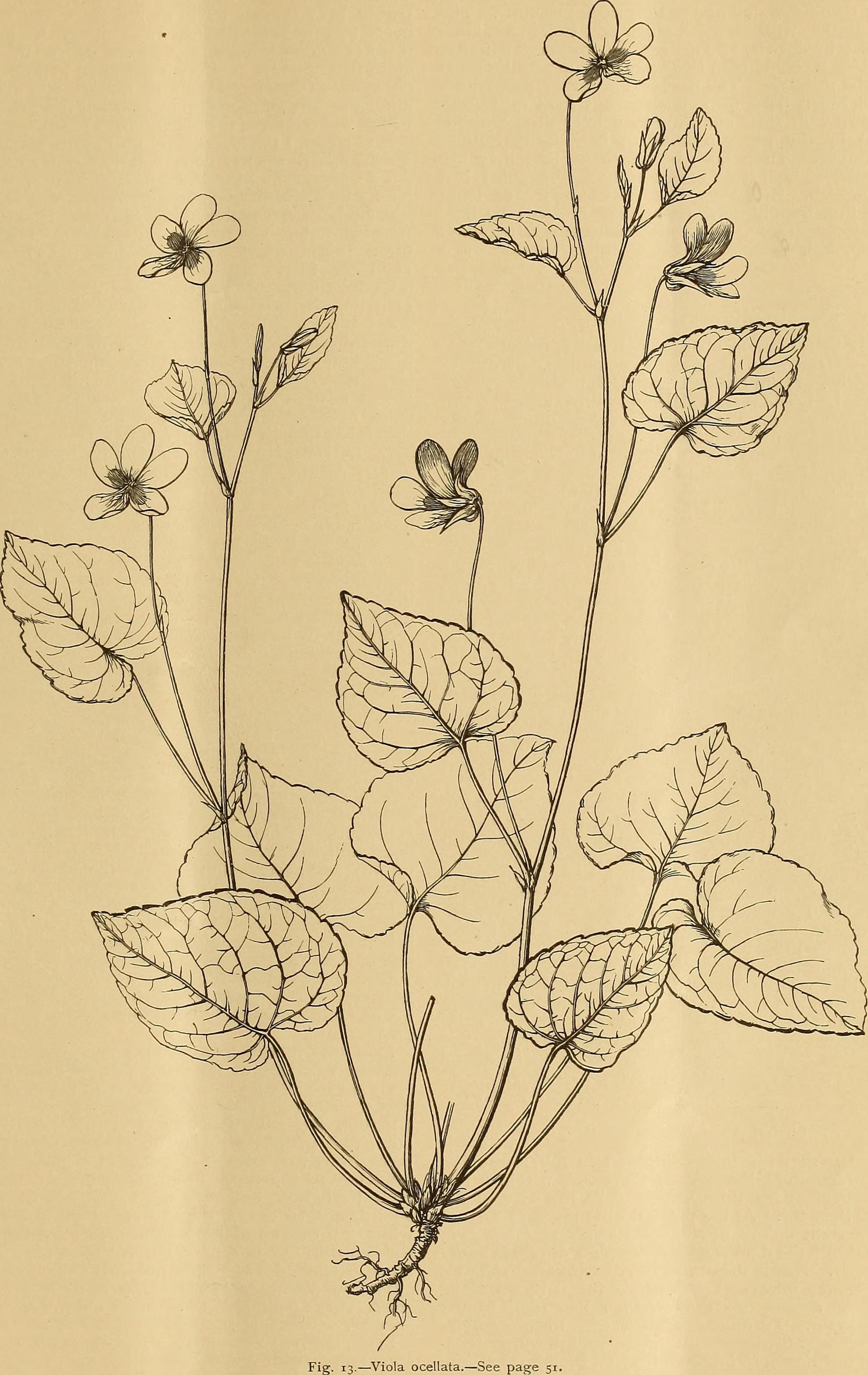
"Viola ocellata" - Garden and forest; a journal of horticulture, landscape art and forestry

V. ocellata is characterized by a height ranging 2–37 centimeters (0.8–14.6 in), the entire plant ranging from glabrous to puberulent. The stems are erect to ascending, originating from a shallow to deep rhizome. The leaves are simple, cordate, and have a crenate to serrate edge, on petioles measuring 0.4–10 centimeters (0.16–3.9 in). Its inflorescence is axillary, with a solitary flower on a peduncle of 1–10 centimeters (0.39–3.9 in). The perianth is characterized by 5 lanceolate, ciliate sepals; 5 petals that appear white from the front, fading to yellow in the center. The top two petals are dark purple on the reverse side. The bottom petal is basally veined with dark purple, and the two side (innermost) petals have the characteristic dark purple spots at the base. The fruits are 5–8 mm round to ovoid shaped capsules, dehiscing directly into the three locules, which is typical for the Violaceae family. The seeds are round, brownish-purple in color and are roughly 2 millimeters in diameter. The rootstocks are fleshy, and often long and stolon-like.

== Ecology ==
This species is considered low-importance as a pollen and nectar source for bees, but moderately important as a food source for a small number of butterfly species, including Speyeria egleis, and Speyeria adiaste, and Boloria epithore. It is widely accepted that Speyeria caterpillars feed exclusively on violets when they are available. In an informal experiment by K. V. Wolfe, when Speyeria butterflies found feeding on other plants in the wild were offered V. ocellata, they readily consumed the Viola instead.

== Related species ==
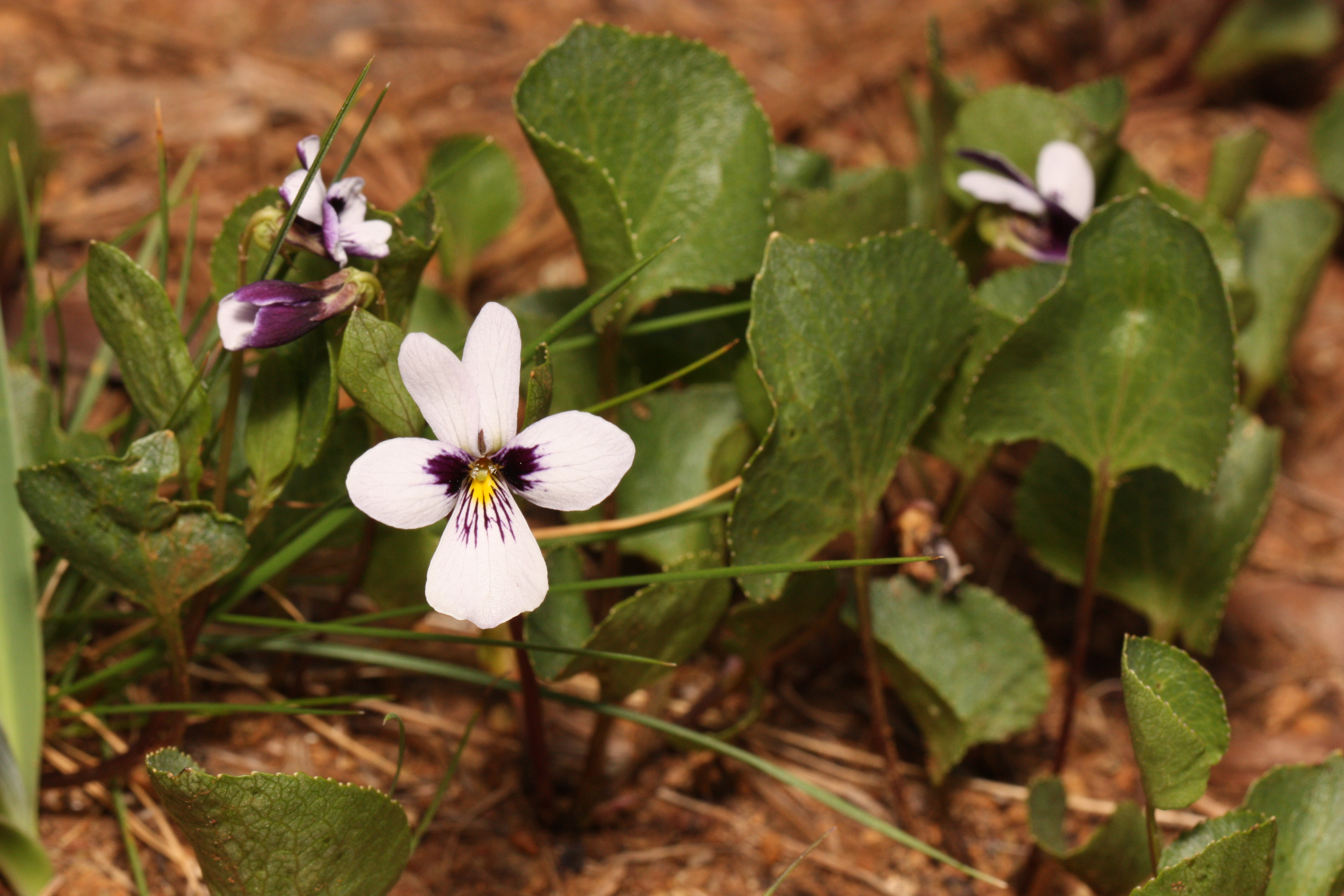
Viola cuneata, "Wedgeleaf Violet" Little Falls Trail, T. J. Howell Botanical Drive, Walter Siegmund, 1 May 2013

Viola ocellata is sister to two other species of violets, Viola flettii (Piper) and Viola cuneata (S. Watson) within the Viola canadensis clade. All three species are native to the Western Coast of North America. While V. flettii is found in alpine and subalpine elevations, V. cuneata is found in a similar range to V. ocellata. V. cuneata is also morphologically more similar to V. ocellata. Despite a relatively recent divergence between the three species, DNA evidence and morphological differences determine them to be distinct.

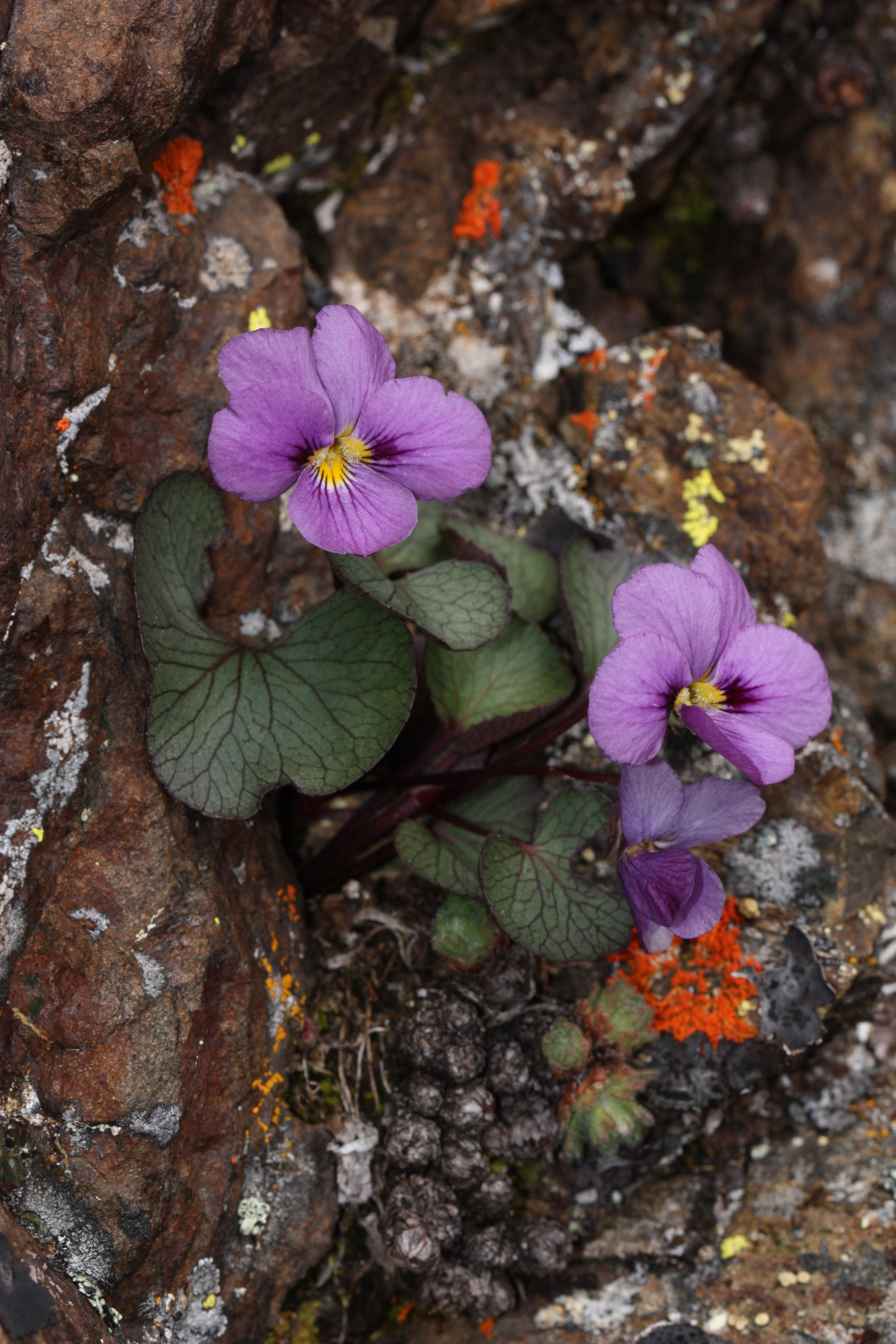
Viola flettii, "Olympic Violet" northern Olympic Mountains, Walter Siegmund, 22 June 2014
