= Neoxanthin =

Names
- IUPAC name (1R,3S)-6-((R,3E,5E,7E,9E,11E,13E,15Z,17E)-18-((1S,4S,6R)-4-hydroxy-2,2,6-trimethyl-7-oxabicyclo[4.1.0]heptan-1-yl)-3,7,12,16-tetramethyloctadeca-1,3,5,7,9,11,13,15,17-nonaen-1-ylidene)-1,5,5-trimethylcyclohexane-1,3-diol
- Other names Foliaxanthin; Neoxanthine

Identifiers
CAS Number	14660-91-4
3D model (JSmol)	Interactive image
ChemSpider	4444659
PubChem CID	5282217
UNII	KK8M5T48AI
- InChI: InChI=1S/C40H56O4/c1-29(17-13-19-31(3)21-22-35-36(5,6)25-33(41)27-38(35,9)43)15-11-12-16-30(2)18-14-20-32(4)23-24-40-37(7,8)26-34(42)28-39(40,10)44-40/h11-21,23-24,33-34,41-43H,25-28H2,1-10H3/b12-11+,17-13+,18-14+,24-23+,29-15+,30-16+,31-19+,32-20-/t22-,33-,34-,38+,39+,40-/m0/s1
- SMILES: CC(/C=C/[C@@]12[C@@](O2)(C)C[C@@H](O)CC1(C)C)=C/C=C/C(C)=C/C=C/C=C(C)/C=C/C=C(C)/C([H])=[C@@]=C3C(C)(C)C[C@H](O)C[C@]3(O)C

Properties
Chemical formula	C_{40}H_{56}O_{4}
Molar mass	600.884 g·mol^{−1}
- Except where otherwise noted, data are given for materials in their standard state (at 25 °C [77 °F], 100 kPa). Infobox references

all-trans Neoxanthin

Neoxanthin is a carotenoid and xanthophyll. In plants, it is an intermediate in the biosynthesis of the plant hormone abscisic acid. It is often present in two forms: all-trans and 9-cis isomers. It is produced from violaxanthin, but a suspected neoxanthin synthase is still to be confirmed. Two different genes were confirmed to be implied in violaxanthin conversion to neoxanthin in Arabidopsis and tomato. It has a specific role in protection against photooxidative stress. It is a major xanthophyll found in green leafy vegetables such as spinach.
