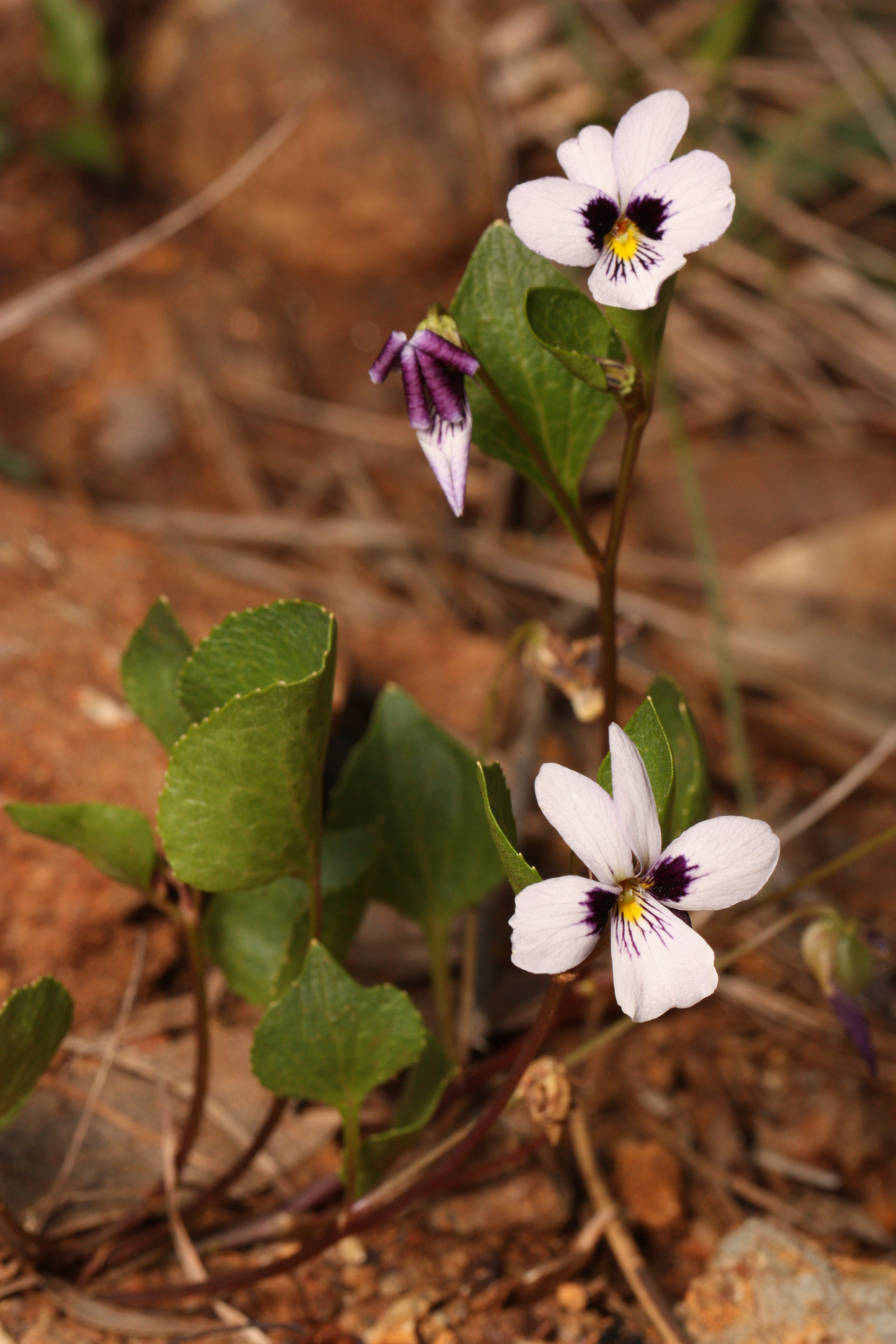

Conservation status
- Apparently Secure (NatureServe)

Scientific classification
- Kingdom: Plantae
- Clade: Tracheophytes
- Clade: Angiosperms
- Clade: Eudicots
- Clade: Rosids
- Order: Malpighiales
- Family: Violaceae
- Genus: Viola
- Species: V. cuneata

Binomial name
- Viola cuneata S.Watson

= Viola cuneata =

Species of flowering plant

Viola cuneata is a species of violet known by the common name wedge-leaf violet. It is native to southwestern Oregon and northwestern California, where it occurs in the forests of the coastal mountain ranges, often on serpentine soils.

== Description ==
This rhizomatous herb produces a hairless stem reaching a maximum height of a few centimeters to around 25 centimeters. The basal leaves have purple-veined green oval, rounded, or wedge-shaped blades that are borne on long petioles. Leaves higher on the stem are smaller. A solitary flower is borne on a very slender upright stem. It has five white petals with yellowish bases, the lateral two, and usually the upper two with purple spots. Their outer surfaces may be deep purple to red, and the lowest three are generally marked with purple veining.
