= Symplocamide A =

Names
- IUPAC name N1-[(2S,5S,8S,11R,12S,15S,18S,21R)-5-(3-bromo-4-methoxybenzyl)-2-[(2S)-butan-2-yl]-15-[3-(carbamoylamino)propyl]-21-hydroxy-4,11-dimethyl-3,6,9,13,16,22-hexaoxo-8-(propan-2-yl)-10-oxa-1,4,7,14,17-pentaazabicyclo[16.3.1]docos-12-yl]-N2-butanoyl-L-glutamamide

Identifiers
CAS Number	1007391-44-7
3D model (JSmol)	Interactive image
ChEMBL	ChEMBL436840
ChemSpider	23314421
PubChem CID	44448139
CompTox Dashboard (EPA)	DTXSID40659157
- InChI: InChI=1S/C46H71BrN10O13/c1-9-12-34(59)51-29(15-18-33(48)58)40(62)55-37-25(6)70-45(67)36(23(3)4)54-41(63)31(22-26-14-17-32(69-8)27(47)21-26)56(7)44(66)38(24(5)10-2)57-35(60)19-16-30(43(57)65)53-39(61)28(52-42(37)64)13-11-20-50-46(49)68/h14,17,21,23-25,28-31,35-38,60H,9-13,15-16,18-20,22H2,1-8H3,(H2,48,58)(H,51,59)(H,52,64)(H,53,61)(H,54,63)(H,55,62)(H3,49,50,68)/t24-,25 ,28-,29-,30-,31-,35 ,36-,37-,38-/m0/s1 Key: XFQCUAOQRAZAJB-APLIVAFESA-N
- SMILES: CCCC(=O)N[C@@H](CCC(=O)N)C(=O)N[C@H]1[C@H](OC(=O)[C@@H](NC(=O)[C@@H](N(C(=O)[C@@H](N2[C@@H](CC[C@@H](C2=O)NC(=O)[C@@H](NC1=O)CCCNC(=O)N)O)[C@@H](C)CC)C)Cc3ccc(c(c3)Br)OC)C(C)C)C

Properties
Chemical formula	C_{46}H_{71}BrN_{10}O_{13}
Molar mass	1052.035 g·mol^{−1}
- Except where otherwise noted, data are given for materials in their standard state (at 25 °C [77 °F], 100 kPa). Infobox references

Symplocamide A is a newly discovered (2008) 3-amino-6-hydroxy-2-piperidone (Ahp) cyclodepsipeptide that has been isolated from a marine cyanobacteria in Papua New Guinea, which has only been identified at the genus level (Symploca). Cyanobacteria, both freshwater and marine, are known as producers of diverse protease inhibitors that may be used to treat diseases, such as HIV, and some forms of cancer. Research on symplocamide A has shown that it is a strong serine protease inhibitor and has a high level of cytotoxicity to cancer cells when used in vitro. As of the time of this writing, its use as a treatment on human participants has not been done and future study will have to be done before any human testing can be commenced.

== Origin ==
Symplocamide A has only recently been discovered when scientists were looking for various marine cyanobacterium in order to extract possible protease inhibitors not seen in freshwater cyanobacterium. It was obtained from Symploca sp. in Papua New Guinea, and the genus has not been recorded in the literature. Using nuclear magnetic resonance (NMR), the molecular formula (C_{46}H_{71}BrN_{10}O_{13}) and structure were elucidated. More data will need to be gathered, as without a genus being described by the discovery of symplocamide A, recreation of the data cannot be confirmed.

== Biological activities ==
Symplocamide A is an extremely potent cytotoxin, which has shown potential for treating H460 lung cancer and neuro-2A neuroblastoma cells with IC_{50} values of 40 nM and 29 nM, respectively. Symplocamide A has also been determined to be a potent protease inhibitor which may be used for the treatment of infectious diseases, such as HIV and HCV, if it is similar to other protease inhibitors that have been used before as treatments.
