= Octreotate =

Identifiers
3D model (JSmol)	Interactive image
PubChem CID	71308309
CompTox Dashboard (EPA)	DTXSID801029867
- InChI: InChI=1S/C49H64N10O11S2/c1-27(60)40-48(68)57-39(47(67)59-41(28(2)61)49(69)70)26-72-71-25-38(56-42(62)33(51)21-29-13-5-3-6-14-29)46(66)54-36(22-30-15-7-4-8-16-30)44(64)55-37(23-31-24-52-34-18-10-9-17-32(31)34)45(65)53-35(43(63)58-40)19-11-12-20-50/h3-10,13-18,24,27-28,33,35-41,52,60-61H,11-12,19-23,25-26,50-51H2,1-2H3,(H,53,65)(H,54,66)(H,55,64)(H,56,62)(H,57,68)(H,58,63)(H,59,67)(H,69,70)/t27-,28-,33-,35+,36+,37-,38+,39+,40+,41+/m1/s1 Key: KEKAEHDXIJNAIJ-WNIOSIORSA-N
- SMILES: C[C@@H](O)[C@H](NC (=O)[C@@H]1CSSC[C@H](NC(=O)[C@H](N)Cc2ccccc2)C(=O)N[C@@H](Cc2ccccc2)C(=O)N[C@H](Cc2c[nH]c3ccccc23)C(=O)N[C@@H](CCCCN)C(=O)N[C@@H]([C@@H](C)O)C(=O)N1)C(=O)O

Properties
Chemical formula	C_{49}H_{64}N_{10}O_{11}S_{2}
Molar mass	1033.23 g·mol^{−1}
- Except where otherwise noted, data are given for materials in their standard state (at 25 °C [77 °F], 100 kPa). Infobox references

Octreotate or octreotide acid is a somatostatin analogue that is closely related to octreotide. Its amino acid sequence is:

H-D-Phe-Cys-Phe-D-Trp-Lys-Thr-Cys-Thr-OH

while octreotide has the terminal threonine reduced to the corresponding amino alcohol.

== See also ==
- DOTA-octreotate
