= Xanthophyll =

Chemical compounds subclass

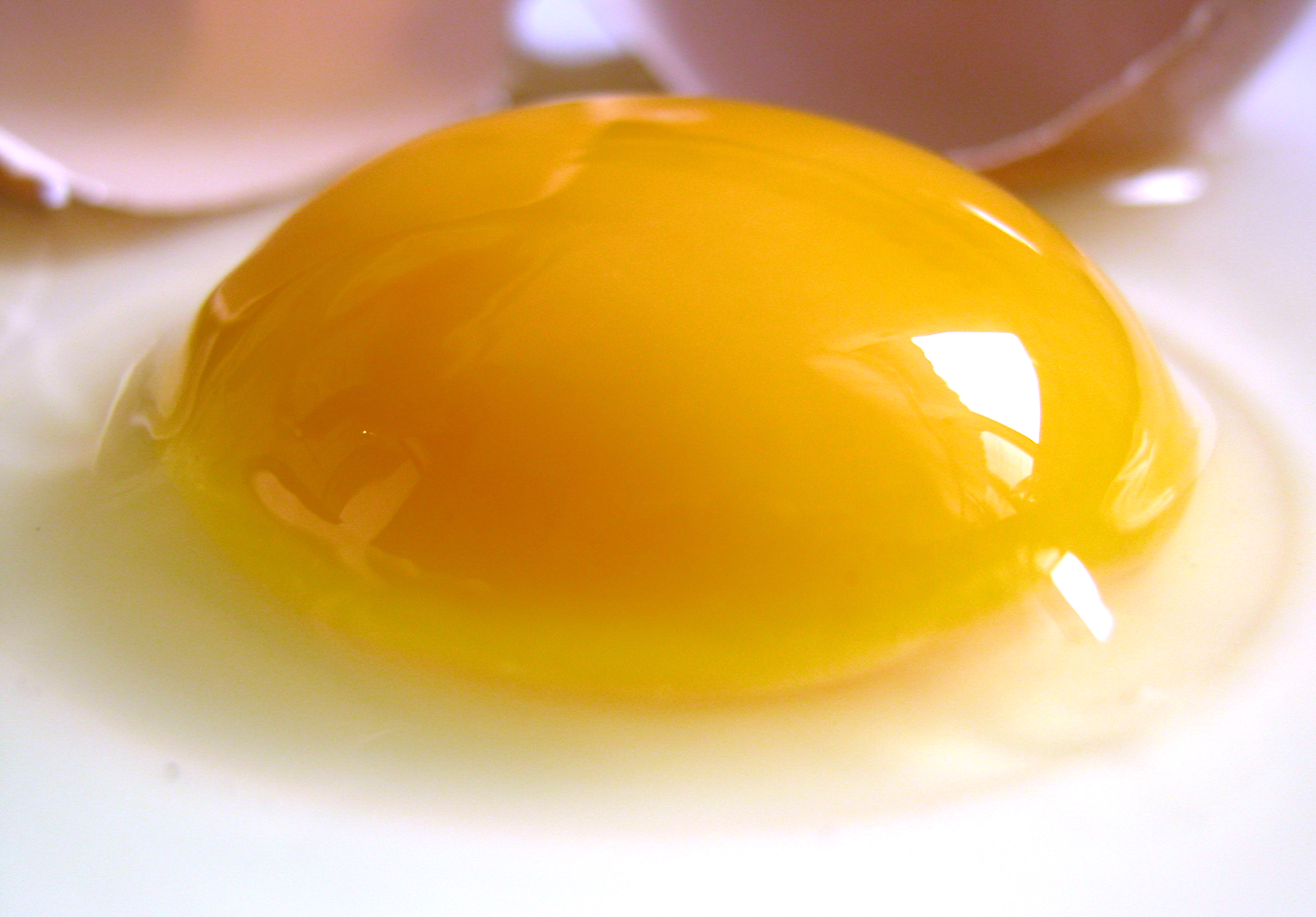
The characteristic color of egg yolk results from the presence of a xanthophyll pigment typical in color of lutein or zeaxanthin of the xanthophylls, a division of the carotenoids group.

Xanthophylls (originally phylloxanthins) are yellow pigments that occur widely in nature and form one of two major divisions of the carotenoid group; the other division is formed by the carotenes. The name is from Greek: xanthos (ξανθός), meaning "yellow", and phyllon (φύλλον), meaning "leaf"), due to their formation of the yellow band seen in early chromatography of leaf pigments.

== Molecular structure ==
The chemical structure of cryptoxanthin. Xanthophylls typically present oxygen as a hydroxyl group.

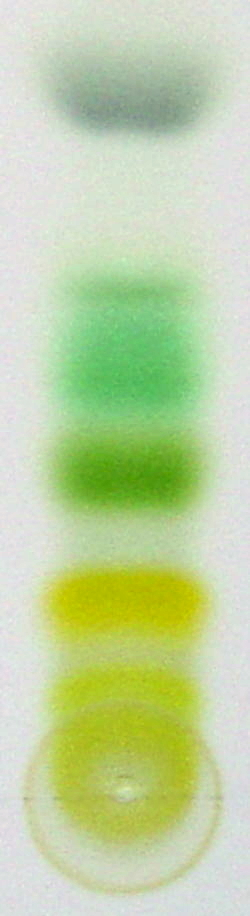
Thin layer chromatography is used to separate components of a plant extract, illustrating the experiment with plant pigments that gave chromatography its name. Plant xanthophylls form the bright yellow band next to the green.

As both are carotenoids, xanthophylls and carotenes are similar in structure, but xanthophylls contain oxygen atoms while carotenes are purely hydrocarbons, which do not contain oxygen. Their content of oxygen causes xanthophylls to be more polar (in molecular structure) than carotenes, and causes their separation from carotenes in many types of chromatography. (Carotenes are usually more orange in color than xanthophylls.) Xanthophylls present their oxygen either as hydroxyl groups and/or as hydrogen atoms substituted by oxygen atoms when acting as a bridge to form epoxides.

== Occurrence ==
Like other carotenoids, xanthophylls are found in highest quantity in the leaves of most green plants, where they act to modulate light energy and perhaps serve as a non-photochemical quenching agent to deal with triplet chlorophyll (an excited form of chlorophyll), which is overproduced at high light levels in photosynthesis. The xanthophylls found in the bodies of animals including humans, and in dietary animal products, are ultimately derived from plant sources in the diet. For example, the yellow color of chicken egg yolks, fat, and skin comes from ingested xanthophylls—primarily lutein, which is added to chicken feed for this purpose.

The yellow color of the macula lutea (literally, yellow spot) in the retina of the human eye results from the presence of lutein and zeaxanthin. Again, both these specific xanthophylls require a source in the human diet to be present in the human eye. They absorb blue and ultraviolet light, thereby protecting the retina from the latter; but xanthophylls do not function in the mechanism of sight itself as they cannot be converted to retinal (also called retinaldehyde or vitamin A aldehyde). Their physical arrangement in the macula lutea is believed to be the cause of Haidinger's brush, an entoptic phenomenon that enables perception of polarized light.

== Example compounds ==
The group of xanthophylls includes (among many other compounds) lutein, zeaxanthin, neoxanthin, violaxanthin, flavoxanthin, and α- and β-cryptoxanthin. The latter compound is the only known xanthophyll to contain a beta-ionone ring, and thus β-cryptoxanthin is the only xanthophyll that is known to possess pro-vitamin A activity for mammals. Even then, it is a vitamin only for plant-eating mammals that possess the enzyme to make retinal from carotenoids that contain beta-ionone (some carnivores lack this enzyme). In species other than mammals, certain xanthophylls may be converted to hydroxylated retinal-analogues that function directly in vision. For example, with the exception of certain flies, most insects use the xanthophyll derived R-isomer of 3-hydroxyretinal for visual activities, which means that β-cryptoxanthin and other xanthophylls (such as lutein and zeaxanthin) may function as forms of visual "vitamin A" for them, while carotenes (such as beta carotene) do not.

== Xanthophyll cycle ==
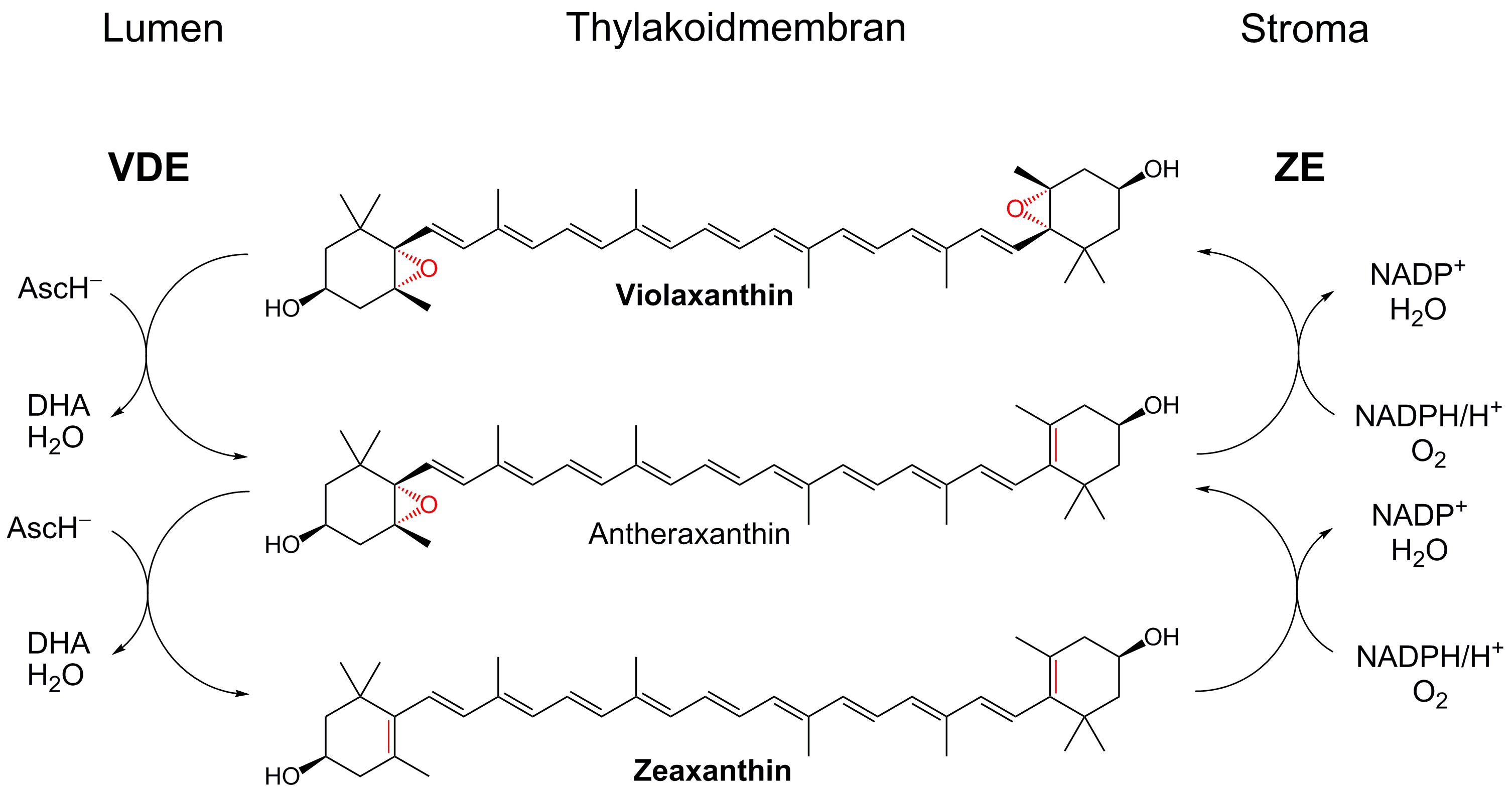
The xanthophyll cycle

The xanthophyll cycle involves the enzymatic removal of epoxy groups from xanthophylls (e.g. violaxanthin, antheraxanthin, diadinoxanthin) to create so-called de-epoxidised xanthophylls (e.g. diatoxanthin, zeaxanthin). These enzymatic cycles were found to play a key role in stimulating energy dissipation within light-harvesting antenna proteins by non-photochemical quenching- a mechanism to reduce the amount of energy that reaches the photosynthetic reaction centers. Non-photochemical quenching is one of the main ways of protecting against photoinhibition. In higher plants, there are three carotenoid pigments that are active in the xanthophyll cycle: violaxanthin, antheraxanthin, and zeaxanthin. During light stress, violaxanthin is converted, i.e. reduced, to zeaxanthin via the intermediate antheraxanthin, which plays a direct photoprotective role acting as a lipid-protective anti-oxidant and by stimulating non-photochemical quenching within light-harvesting proteins. This conversion of violaxanthin to zeaxanthin is done by the enzyme violaxanthin de-epoxidase (EC 1.23.5.1), while the reverse reaction, i.e. oxidation, is performed by zeaxanthin epoxidase (EC 1.14.15.21).

In diatoms and dinoflagellates, the xanthophyll cycle consists of the pigment diadinoxanthin, which is transformed into diatoxanthin (diatoms) or dinoxanthin (dinoflagellates) under high-light conditions.

Wright et al. (Feb 2011) found that, "The increase in zeaxanthin appears to surpass the decrease in violaxanthin in spinach" and commented that the discrepancy could be explained by "a synthesis of zeaxanthin from beta-carotene", however they noted further study is required to explore this hypothesis.

== Food sources ==
Xanthophylls are found in all young leaves and in etiolated leaves. Examples of other rich sources include papaya, peaches, prunes, and squash, which contain lutein diesters. Kale contains about 18 mg lutein and zeaxanthin per 100g, spinach about 11 mg/100g, parsley about 6 mg/100g, peas about 3 mg/110g, squash about 2 mg/100g, and pistachios about 1 mg/100g.
