= Apratoxin A =

Names
- IUPAC name (2S,3S,5S,7S,10S,16S,19S,22S,25E,27S)-16-[(2S)-butan-2-yl]-7-tert-butyl-3-hydroxy-22-(4-methoxybenzyl)-2,5,17,19,20,25-hexamethyl-8-oxa-29-thia-14,17,20,23,30-pentaazatricyclo[25.2.1.010,14]triaconta-1(30),25-diene-9,15,18,21,24-pentone

Identifiers
CAS Number	350791-64-9
3D model (JSmol)	Interactive image
ChEBI	CHEBI:35212
ChEMBL	ChEMBL501696
ChemSpider	4885482
PubChem CID	6326668
UNII	7F7JX4PFM3
CompTox Dashboard (EPA)	DTXSID5040419
- InChI: InChI=1S/C45H69N5O8S/c1-13-27(3)38-43(55)50-20-14-15-35(50)44(56)58-37(45(7,8)9)22-26(2)21-36(51)29(5)40-46-32(25-59-40)23-28(4)39(52)47-34(24-31-16-18-33(57-12)19-17-31)42(54)48(10)30(6)41(53)49(38)11/h16-19,23,26-27,29-30,32,34-38,51H,13-15,20-22,24-25H2,1-12H3,(H,47,52)/b28-23+/t26-,27-,29-,30-,32-,34-,35-,36-,37-,38-/m0/s1 Key: KXUJXPZXILTXDA-CKIYSKEDSA-N; InChI=1/C45H69N5O8S/c1-13-27(3)38-43(55)50-20-14-15-35(50)44(56)58-37(45(7,8)9)22-26(2)21-36(51)29(5)40-46-32(25-59-40)23-28(4)39(52)47-34(24-31-16-18-33(57-12)19-17-31)42(54)48(10)30(6)41(53)49(38)11/h16-19,23,26-27,29-30,32,34-38,51H,13-15,20-22,24-25H2,1-12H3,(H,47,52)/b28-23+/t26-,27-,29-,30-,32-,34-,35-,36-,37-,38-/m0/s1 Key: KXUJXPZXILTXDA-CKIYSKEDBN
- SMILES: [H]N1[C@@H](Cc2ccc(OC)cc2)C(=O)N(C)[C@@H](C)C(=O)N(C)[C@@H]([C@@H](C)CC)C(=O)N2CCC[C@H]2C(=O)O[C@@H](C[C@@H](C)C[C@H](O)[C@H](C)C2=N[C@H](CS2)\C=C(C)\C1=O)C(C)(C)C

Properties
Chemical formula	C_{45}H_{69}N_{5}O_{8}S
Molar mass	840.12426 g/mol
- Except where otherwise noted, data are given for materials in their standard state (at 25 °C [77 °F], 100 kPa). verify (what is ?) Infobox references

Apratoxin A is a cyanobacterial secondary metabolite, known as a potent cytotoxic marine natural product. It is a derivative of the Apratoxin family of cytotoxins. The mixed peptide-polyketide natural product comes from a polyketide synthase/non-ribosomal peptide synthase pathway (PKS/NRPS). This cytotoxin is known for inducing G1-phase cell cycle arrest and apoptosis. This natural product's activity has made it a popular target for developing anticancer derivatives.

== Structural characteristics and determination ==
Apratoxin A is a mixed peptide-polyketide cyclic structure, as shown above. It has a thiazoline ring flanked by polyketide segments, one of which has an unusual methylation pattern. The structure has been elucidated by spectral analysis, including several 2D NMR techniques. The absolute configuration of the amino acid segments was determined by chiral HPLC analysis.

== Biosynthesis ==
Apratoxin A comes from the Apratoxin biosynthetic pathway. Figure 1 describes a proposed Biosynthetic pathway of Apratoxins. The Apratoxin biosynthetic pathway is an organization of type I modular mixed polyketide synthase/non-ribosomal peptide synthase (PKS/NRPS). Genetically, the 58kb biosynthetic gene cluster is composed of 12 open reading frames (ORFs), as shown in Figure 1.

=== Modules and domains ===
Each type I polyketide-synthase module consist of several domains with defined function, separated by short spacer regions. The non-ribosomal peptides are synthesized by multiple specialized NRPS enzymes. Due to the structural and mechanistic similarities between polyketide and non-ribosomal biosynthesis, Apratoxin A has incorporated modules from both biosynthesis pathways.

The following Domains are proposed for the Apratoxin A biosynthesis:

- AR – Adapter Region
- GNAT - GCN3 acyl Transferase
- GNMT – Glycine-N-methyl Transferase
- MT – Methyl Transferase
- KS – Keto Synthase
- AT – Acyl Transferase
- KR – Keto Reductase
- ER – Enoyl Reductase
- ACP – Acyl Carrier Protein
- HCS - HMG-CoA Synthase
- ECH – Enoyl-CoA Hydratase
- C – Condensation
- A – Adenylation
- PCP – Peptidyl Carrier Protein
- CY – Cyclase

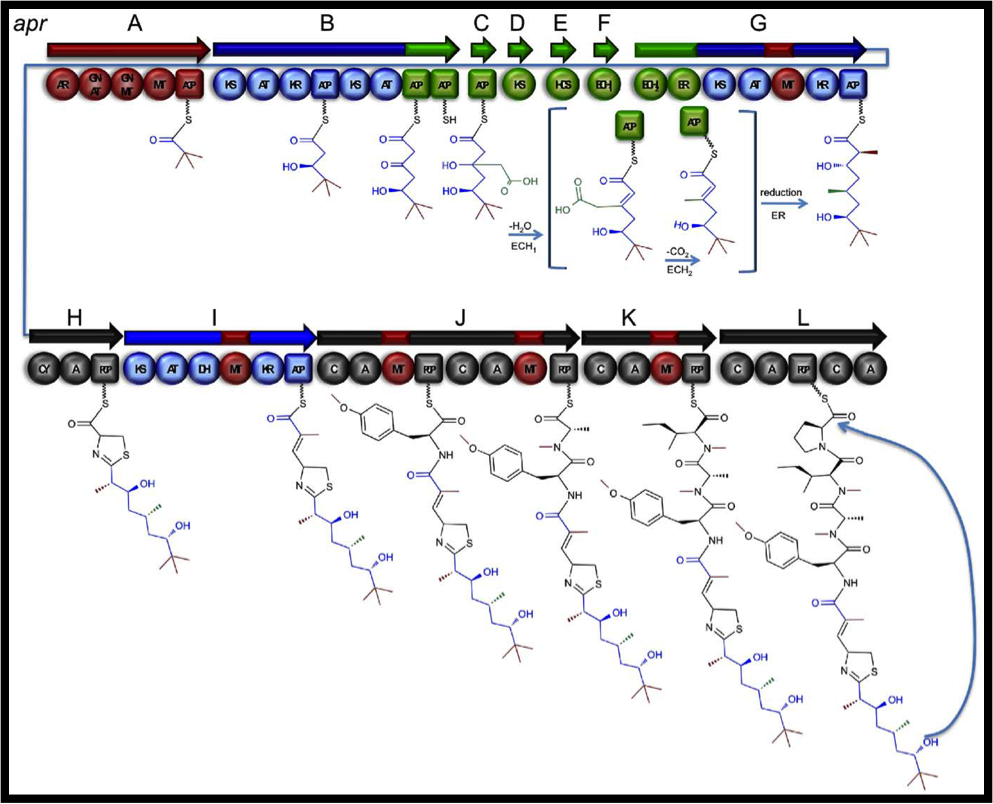
Figure 1, Proposed Biosynthesis of Apratoxin A.

=== Stages ===
The growing chain, shown in Figure 1, is handed over from one thiol group to the next by trans-acylation and is released at the end by a cyclization, promoted by a cyclase enzyme. A Tert-butyl thioester is loaded to the ACP. The segment is extended and treated with KR at the first carbonyl segment. Another acetyl-SCoA extension takes place and ACP transfers the polyketide portion to be modified at the beta-hydroxyl position, relevant to the thioester, to a methyl-carboxylic acid. There is a dehydration and decarboxylation. Eventually, the post-pathway modification methylates the beta-hydroxy position, while establishing stereocenters for the other methyl (from a methyl-malonylCoA segment) and other two hydroxyls. The polyketide segment is trans-acylated to the next module for NRPS. During NRPS, the thiazoline is formed before any peptides segments are loaded. The final structure is cyclized by an addition-elimination type mechanism. Stereochemistry of the peptide segments are defined by the substrate active-site in each enzymatic step.

== Pharmacological relevance ==
Cyanobacterial metabolites are commonly found to be useful in cancer treatment. In particular, Apartoxin A has been found to be a potent cancer cell cytotoxin. It has been found to be remarkably cytotoxic in both in vitro and in vivo studies. Apartoxin A has been found to induce G1-phase cell cycle arrest and apoptosis. Although much work has been done to understand the mechanism-of-action for this cytotoxin, there is no defined understanding for how Apratoxin A mediates antitumor activity in the cell. Also, Apratoxin A has lacks the necessary selectivity to be a potential anti-tumor agent even though numerous reports have shown differential cytotoxicity in 60 tumor cell lines.
