= Flavoxanthin =

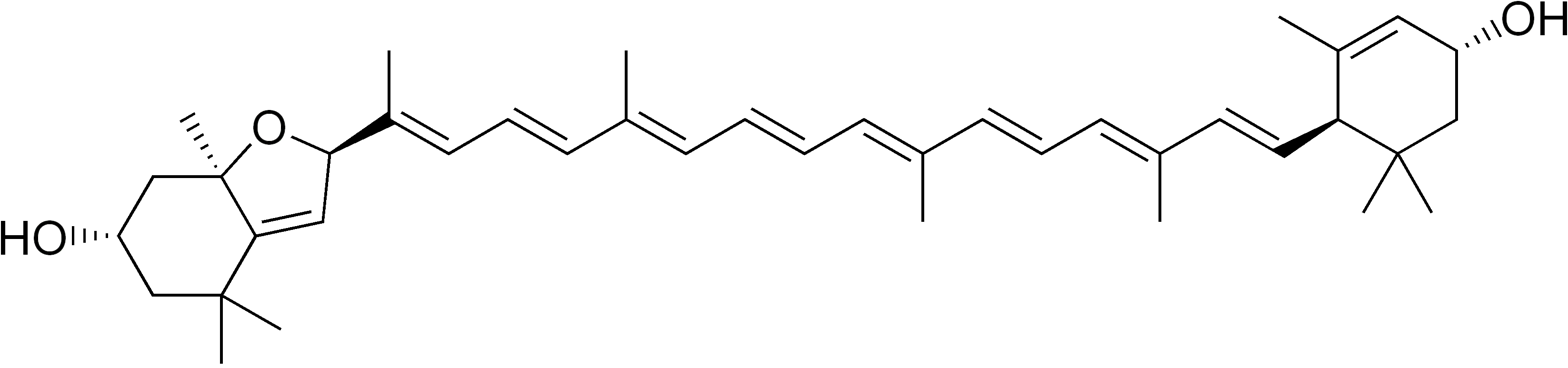

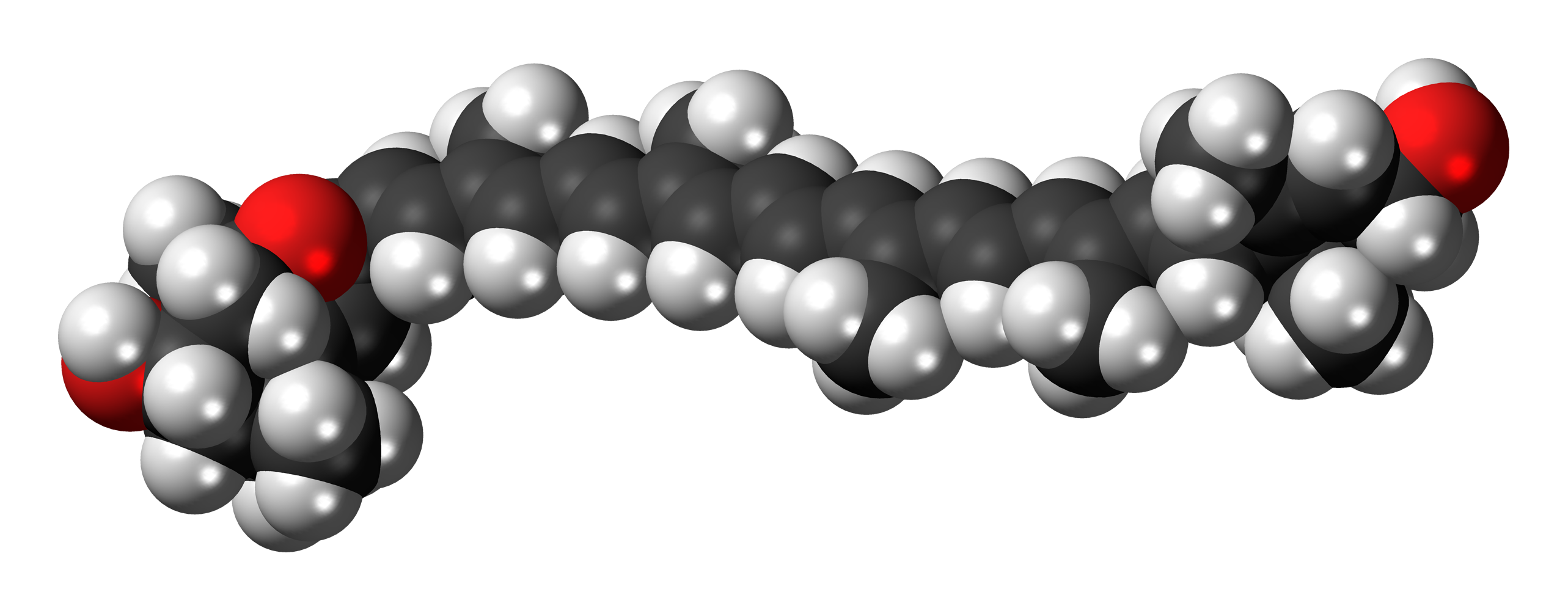

Names
- IUPAC name (3R,5R,8R,3′R,6′R)-5,8-Epoxy-5,8-dihydro-β,ε-carotene-3,3′-diol
- Systematic IUPAC name (2R,6S,7aR)-2-{(2E,4E,6E,8E,10E,12E,14E,16E)-17-[(1R,4R)-4-Hydroxy-2,6,6-trimethylcyclohex-2-en-1-yl]-6,11,15-trimethylheptadeca-2,4,6,8,10,12,14,16-octaen-2-yl}-4,4,7a-trimethyl-2,4,5,6,7,7a-hexahydro-1-benzofuran-6-ol
- Other names: 5,8-Epoxy-5,8-dihydro-γ-carotene-3,3'-diol; all-trans-Flavoxanthin; E161a

Identifiers
CAS Number	512-29-8
3D model (JSmol)	Interactive image
ChEBI	CHEBI:5087
ChemSpider	4444650
E number	E161a (colours)
KEGG	C08594
PubChem CID	5281238
UNII	S1D2WO17XX
- InChI: InChI=1S/C40H56O3/c1-28(17-13-18-30(3)21-22-35-32(5)23-33(41)25-38(35,6)7)15-11-12-16-29(2)19-14-20-31(4)36-24-37-39(8,9)26-34(42)27-40(37,10)43-36/h11-24,33-36,41-42H,25-27H2,1-10H3/b12-11+,17-13+,19-14+,22-21+,28-15+,29-16+,30-18+,31-20+/t33-,34-,35-,36+,40+/m0/s1 Key: JRHJXXLCNATYLS-NGZWBNMCSA-N; InChI=1/C40H56O3/c1-28(17-13-18-30(3)21-22-35-32(5)23-33(41)25-38(35,6)7)15-11-12-16-29(2)19-14-20-31(4)36-24-37-39(8,9)26-34(42)27-40(37,10)43-36/h11-24,33-36,41-42H,25-27H2,1-10H3/b12-11+,17-13+,19-14+,22-21+,28-15+,29-16+,30-18+,31-20+/t33-,34-,35-,36+,40+/m0/s1 Key: JRHJXXLCNATYLS-NGZWBNMCBG
- SMILES: CC1=C[C@@H](CC([C@H]1\C=C\C(=C\C=C\C(=C\C=C\C=C(/C)\C=C\C=C(/C)\[C@H]2C=C3C(C[C@@H](C[C@]3(O2)C)O)(C)C)\C)\C)(C)C)O

Properties
Chemical formula	C_{40}H_{56}O_{3}
Molar mass	584.87 g/mol
Appearance	Yellow solid
Melting point	184 °C (363 °F; 457 K)
- Except where otherwise noted, data are given for materials in their standard state (at 25 °C [77 °F], 100 kPa). verify (what is ?) Infobox references

Flavoxanthin is a natural xanthophyll pigment with a golden-yellow color found in small quantities in a variety of plants. As a food additive it is assigned the E number E161a as a food coloring although it is not approved for use in the EU, UK or USA. It is listed as food additive 161a in Australia and New Zealand where it is approved for usage as an ingredient in food products.
