= Dinoxanthin =

Names
- IUPAC name (3S,3'S,5R,5'R,6S)-3,5'-Dihydroxy-6',7'-didehydro-5,5',6,6'-tetrahydro-5,6-epoxy-β,β-caroten-3'-yl acetate

Identifiers
CAS Number	54369-12-9
3D model (JSmol)	Interactive image
ChemSpider	4947063
PubChem CID	16061289
UNII	3QQ722WU3N
- InChI: InChI=1S/C42H58O5/c1-30(18-14-20-32(3)22-23-37-38(6,7)28-36(46-34(5)43)29-40(37,10)45)16-12-13-17-31(2)19-15-21-33(4)24-25-42-39(8,9)26-35(44)27-41(42,11)47-42/h12-22,24-25,35-36,44-45H,26-29H2,1-11H3/b13-12+,18-14+,19-15+,25-24+,30-16+,31-17+,32-20+,33-21+/t23-,35-,36-,40+,41+,42-/m0/s1 Key: PVNVIBOWBAPFOE-CQZDCAQOSA-N
- SMILES: C[C@@]13O[C@]1(/C=C/C(C)=C/C=C/C(C)=C/C=C/C=C(C)/C=C/C=C(C)/[C@@H]=C=C2C(C)(C)C[C@@H](OC(C)=O)C[C@]2(C)O)C(C)(C)C[C@H](O)C3

Properties
Chemical formula	C_{42}H_{58}O_{5}
Molar mass	642.921 g·mol^{−1}
- Except where otherwise noted, data are given for materials in their standard state (at 25 °C [77 °F], 100 kPa). Infobox references

Dinoxanthin is a type of xanthophyll found in dinoflagellates. This compound is a potential antioxidant and may help to protect dinoflagellates against reactive oxygen species.
