= Violaxanthin =

Names
- IUPAC name (3S,3′S,5R,5′R,6S,6′S)-5,6:5′,6′-Diepoxy-5,5′,6,6′-tetrahydro-β,β-carotene-3,3′-diol
- Systematic IUPAC name (1R,1′R,3S,3′S,6S,6′S)-6,6′-[(1E,3E,5E,7E,9E,11E,13E,15E,17E)-3,7,12,16-Tetramethyloctadeca-1,3,5,7,9,11,13,15,17-nonaene-1,18-diyl]bis(1,5,5-trimethyl-7-oxabicyclo[4.1.0]heptan-3-ol)
- Other names: Zeaxanthin diepoxide; all-trans-Violaxanthin; E161e

Identifiers
CAS Number	126-29-4
3D model (JSmol)	Interactive image
ChEBI	CHEBI:35288
ChemSpider	395237
E number	E161e (colours)
PubChem CID	448438
UNII	51C926029A
CompTox Dashboard (EPA)	DTXSID901016934
- InChI: InChI=1S/C40H56O4/c1-29(17-13-19-31(3)21-23-39-35(5,6)25-33(41)27-37(39,9)43-39)15-11-12-16-30(2)18-14-20-32(4)22-24-40-36(7,8)26-34(42)28-38(40,10)44-40/h11-24,33-34,41-42H,25-28H2,1-10H3/b12-11+,17-13+,18-14+,23-21+,24-22+,29-15+,30-16+,31-19+,32-20+/t33-,34-,37+,38+,39-,40-/m0/s1 Key: SZCBXWMUOPQSOX-WVJDLNGLSA-N
- SMILES: C\C(=C/C=C/C=C(\C)/C=C/C=C(\C)/C=C/[C@]12C(C[C@@H](C[C@]1(O2)C)O)(C)C)\C=C\C=C(/C)\C=C\[C@]34C(C[C@@H](C[C@]3(O4)C)O)(C)C

Properties
Chemical formula	C_{40}H_{56}O_{4}
Molar mass	600.884 g·mol^{−1}
Appearance	Orange crystals
Melting point	200 °C (392 °F; 473 K)
- Except where otherwise noted, data are given for materials in their standard state (at 25 °C [77 °F], 100 kPa). verify (what is ?) Infobox references

Violaxanthin is a xanthophyll pigment with an orange color found in a variety of plants. Violaxanthin is the product of the epoxidation of zeaxanthin where the oxygen atoms are from reactive oxygen species (ROS). Such ROS's arise when a plant is subject to solar radiation so intense that the light cannot all be absorbed by the chlorophyll.

== Food coloring ==
Violaxanthin is used as a food coloring under the E number E161e and INS number 161e. The coloring is not approved for use in food in the EU or the United States, but is allowed in Australia and New Zealand.

== Violaxanthin cycle ==
Violaxanthin is a participant in the violaxanthin cycle.

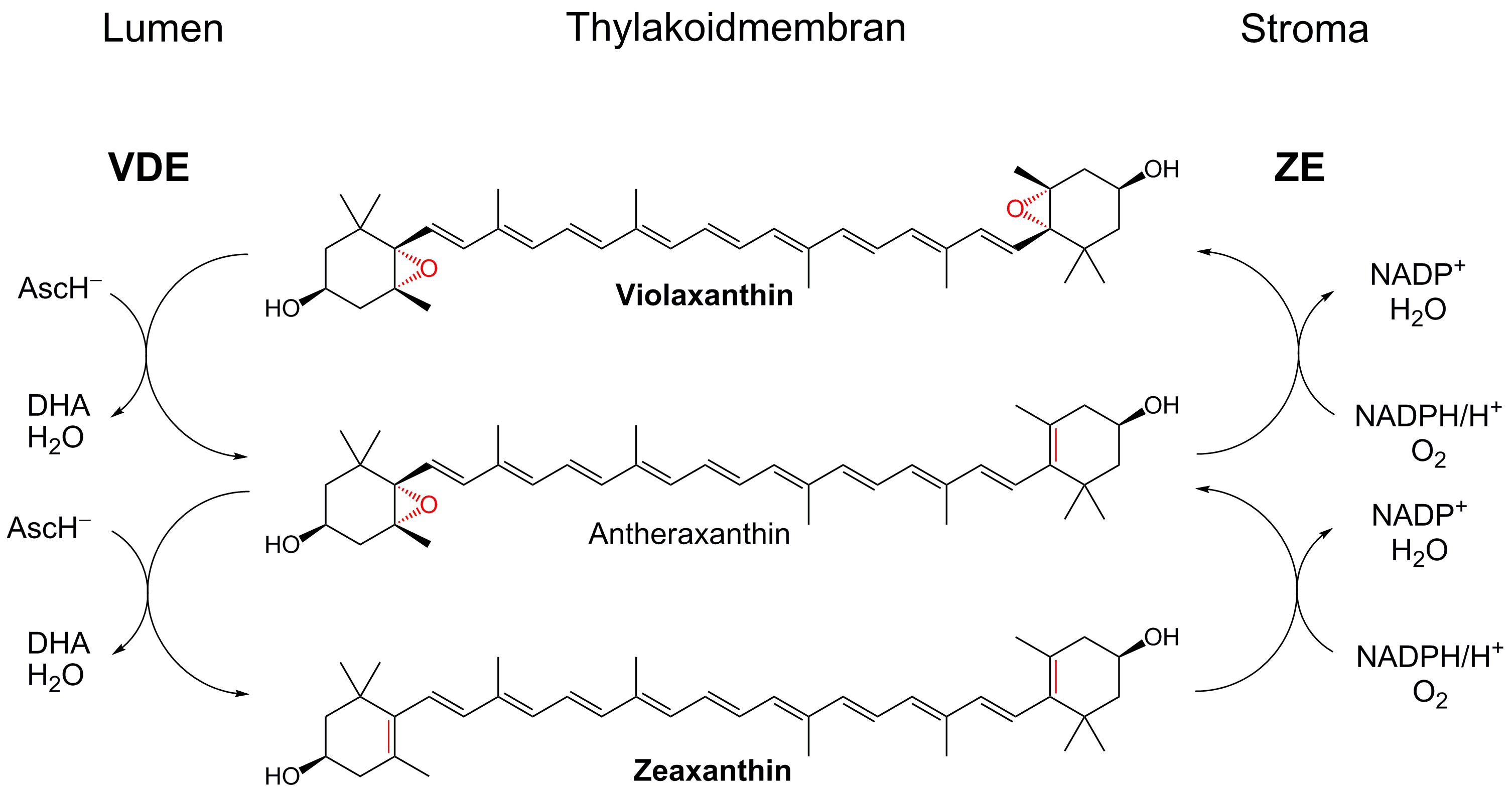
The xanthophyll cycle
