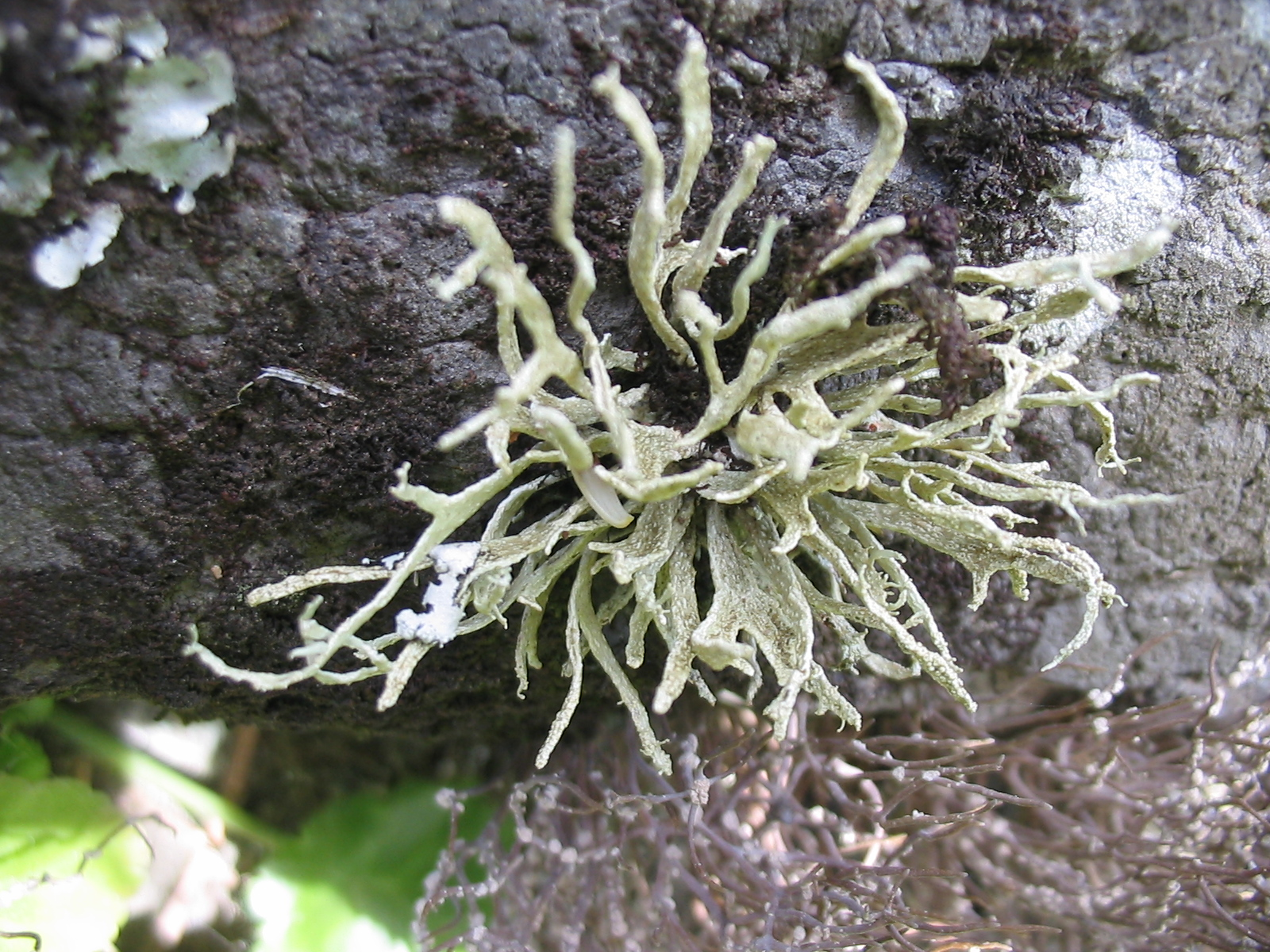

Scientific classification
- Kingdom: Fungi
- Division: Ascomycota
- Class: Lecanoromycetes
- Order: Lecanorales
- Family: Ramalinaceae
- Genus: Ramalina
- Species: R. azorica

Binomial name
- Ramalina azorica Aptroot & F.Schumm (2008)

= Ramalina azorica =

Species of lichen-forming fungus

Ramalina azorica is a species of saxicolous (rock-dwelling), fruticose lichen in the family Ramalinaceae. It is found in the Azores, where it grows on coastal rocks.

== Taxonomy ==
The lichen was formally described as a new species in 2008 by the lichenologists André Aptroot and Felix Schumm. The type specimen was collected by Schumm in the Azores, specifically at Ponta da Ferraia on São Miguel Island. The collection occurred at a minimal elevation of just 1 metre above sea level on June 4, 2003.

== Description ==
Ramalina azorica has a dull, shrubby thallus that clusters into dense groups of 5–25 branches. These branches originate from a commonly dark, often blackish base, and can extend up to 11 cm (4.3 in) in length. They are oriented upright to hanging and have a greenish to yellowish-grey hue. The thallus is somewhat fragile and shows a high degree of variability in its branching patterns. Some branches resemble antlers, while others are denser and become cylindrical towards the tips. The surface of these branches is wrinkled, featuring cartilaginous (cartilage-like) strands that rise to the surface to form lines known as pseudocyphellae—areas where the cortex is partially absent, revealing the underlying layer.

In cross-section, the branches are flattened and can be distinctly contorted in a cork-screw-like fashion. They typically have a diameter of up to about 5 mm, although they are often much slimmer. This species does not produce soredia, which are small, powdery propagules used for asexual reproduction. Reproductive structures called apothecia appear along the margins of the branches. These are 2–4 mm in diameter and can be flat to convex in shape. The ascospores within these structures are divided by a single septum, are clear (hyaline), and range from straight to slightly curved, measuring 8.8–12 μm long and 3.3–4.4 μm wide. Additionally, pycnidia—small fruiting bodies that release asexual spores—are located near the margins of the branches and are pale in colour.

Chemically, the medulla (the innermost layer of the thallus) does not react to common chemical spot tests (C−, K−, Pd−), but it does fluoresce white under ultraviolet light, indicating the presence of divaricatic acid and another unknown pigment. The cortex, or outer layer, contains usnic acid, which is commonly found in many lichen species and contributes to their colouration and protection from sunlight.

== Habitat and distribution ==
Ramalina azorica is found exclusively on the Azores islands of Pico, Terceira, Faial, and São Miguel. This species typically grows on coastal rocks and the lava of walls bordering coastal fields, where it occurs in local abundance.

== See also ==
- List of Ramalina species
