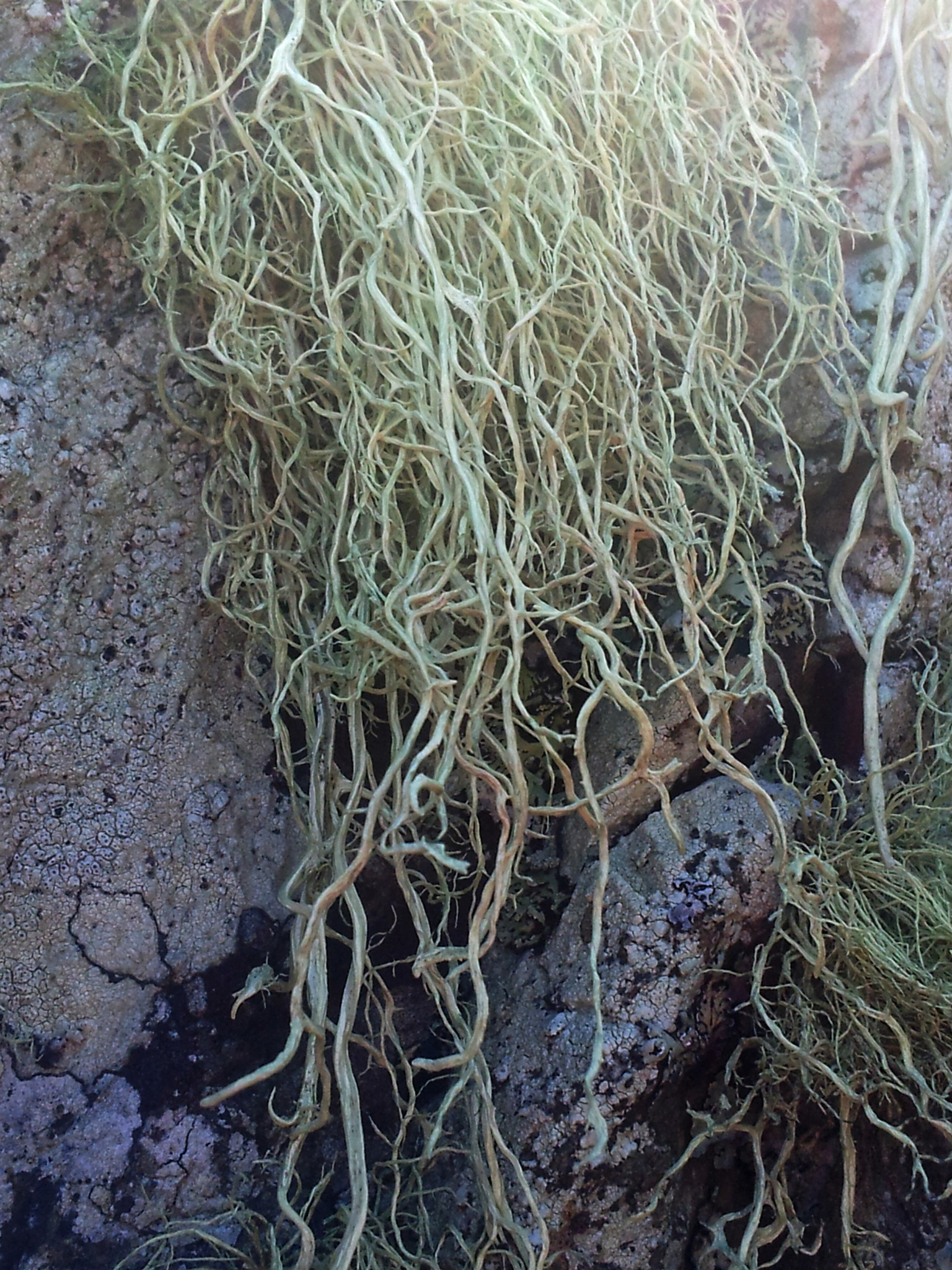

Conservation status
- Declining (NZ TCS)

Scientific classification
- Kingdom: Fungi
- Division: Ascomycota
- Class: Lecanoromycetes
- Order: Lecanorales
- Family: Ramalinaceae
- Genus: Ramalina
- Species: R. meridionalis

Binomial name
- Ramalina meridionalis Blanchon & Bannister

= Ramalina meridionalis =

Species of lichen-forming fungus

Ramalina meridionalis is a species of lichen in the family Ramalinaceae. The species was described in 2002 by Dan Blanchon and Jennifer Mary Bannister, and is found in New Zealand and on Norfolk Island and Lord Howe Island in Australia.

== Description ==
Ramalina meridionalis is grey-green to yellow green in colour, and has suberect to pendulous branches typically measuring between 3–12 cm (1.2–4.7 in) in length, but may grow up to 20 cm (7.9 in). The species is typically more densely branches at the base. It can be distinguished from Ramalina arabum due to R. meridionalis having terete and twisted young branches, and from Ramalina australiensis due to the presence of norstictic acid.

== Taxonomy ==
The species was first described in 2002 by Dan Blanchon and Jennifer Mary Bannister. Prior to this point, specimens of the species had been labelled Ramalina arabum.

== Distribution and habitat ==
The species is commonly found on Norfolk Island, on Lord Howe Island, and can also be found in rocky areas of northern New Zealand as far south as the Coromandel Peninsula, and as far northeast as the Kermadec Islands.

== Ecology ==
The species is either saxicolous (rock dwelling) or corticolous (bark-dwelling) in Australia. In New Zealand, the species is only very rarely corticolous, typically found on rock and rarely on pōhutukawa or coastal scrub plants, or on Avicennia marina mangroves in estuarine habitats in Northland.

== Gallery ==
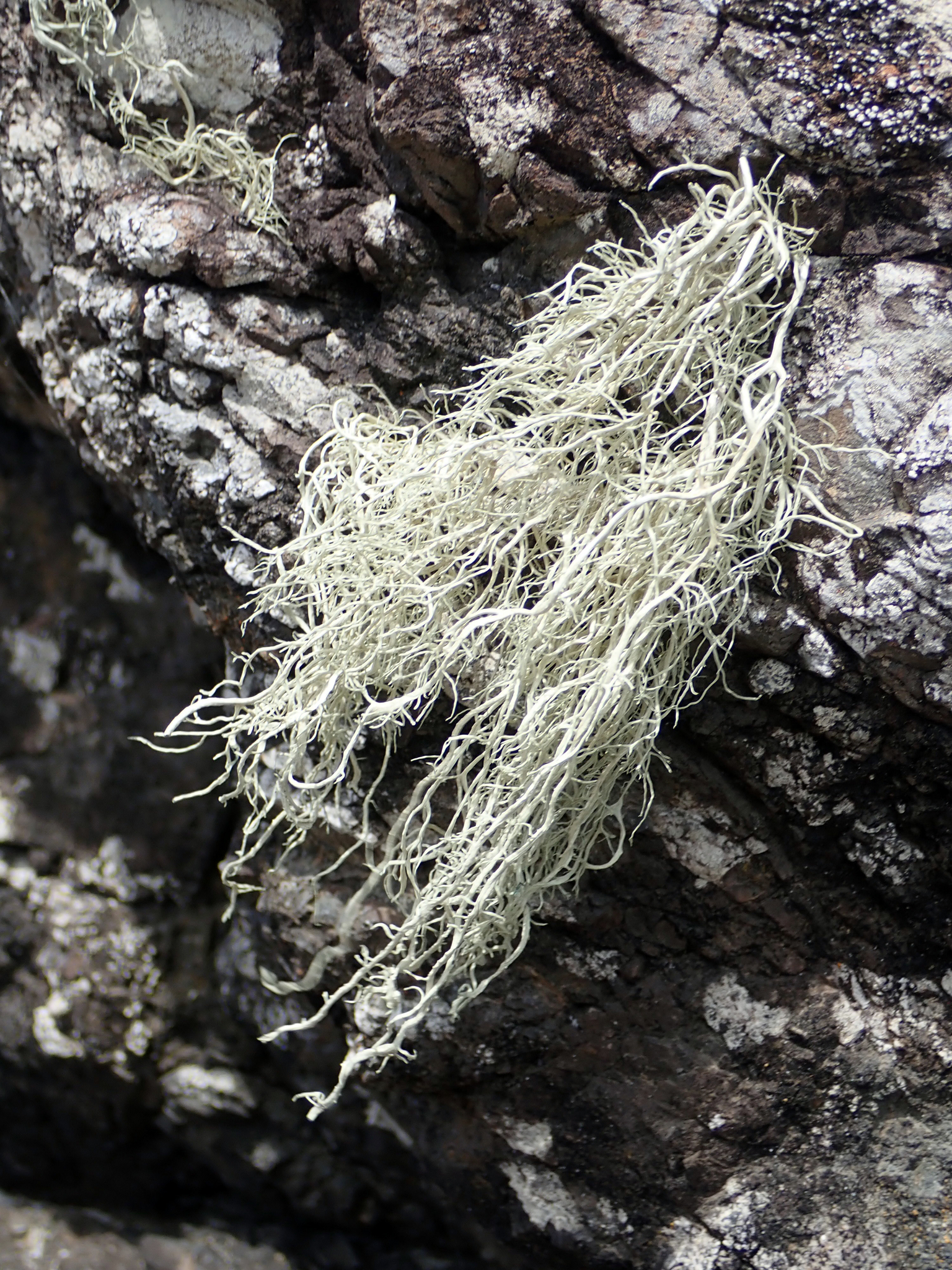

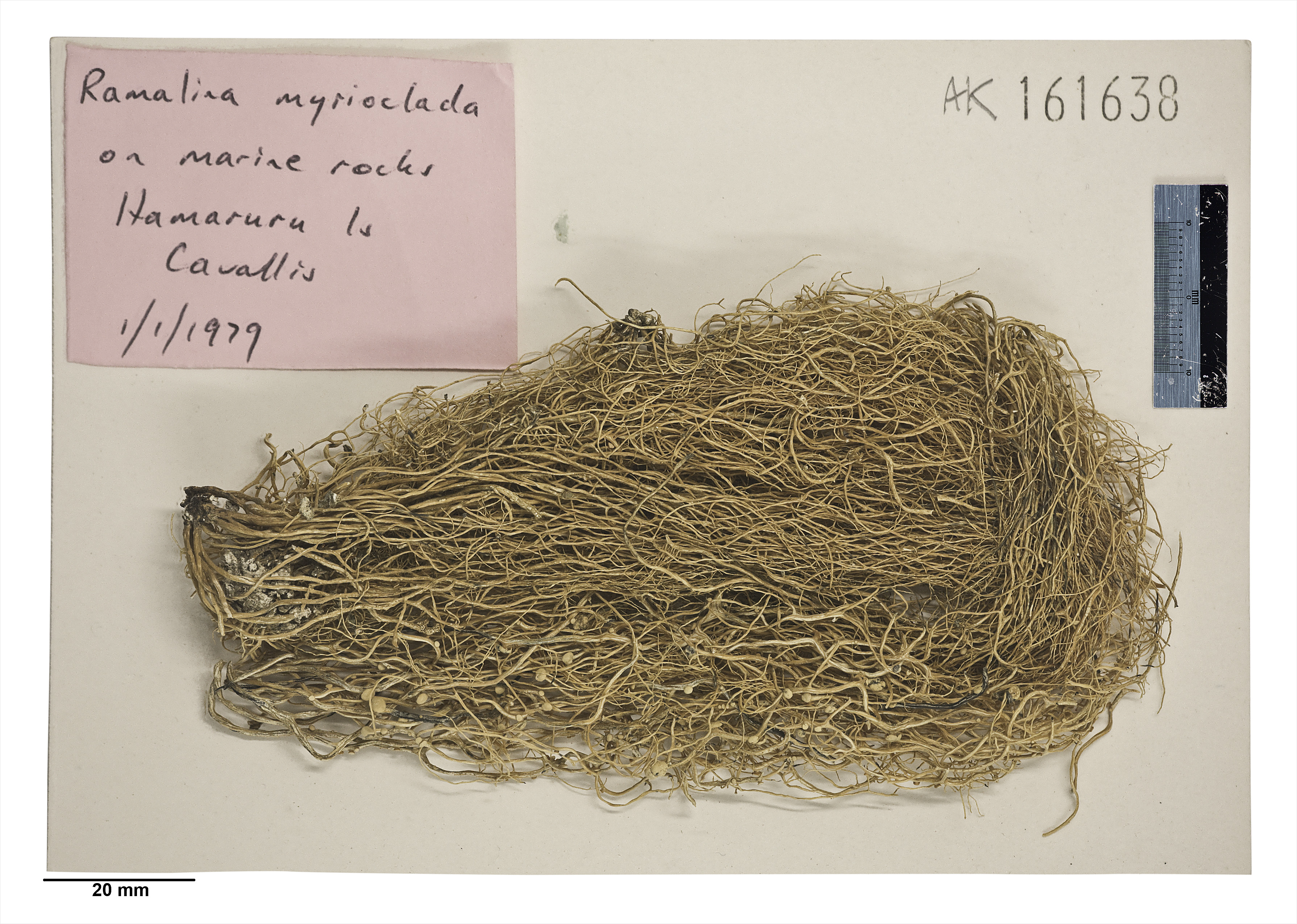

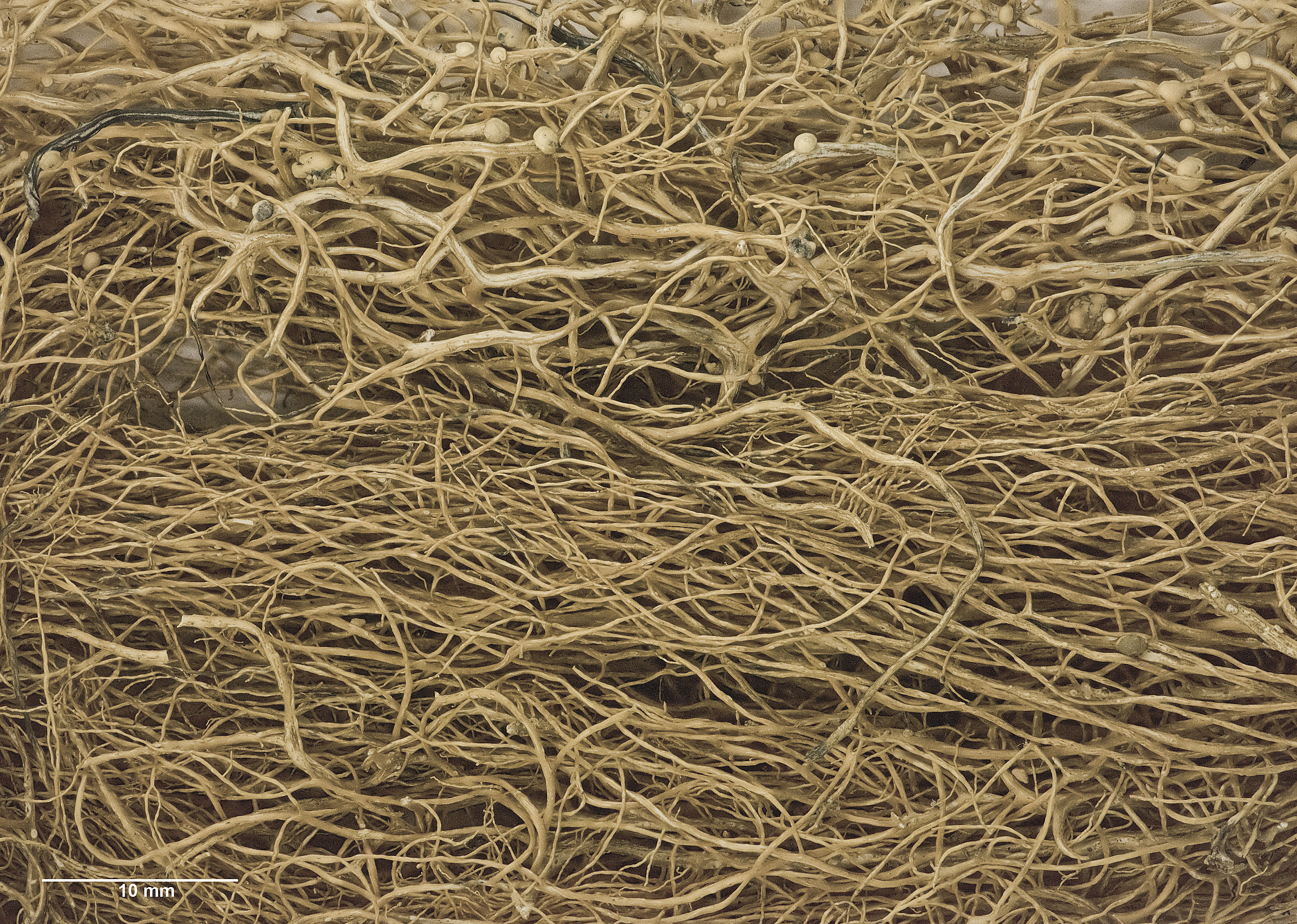

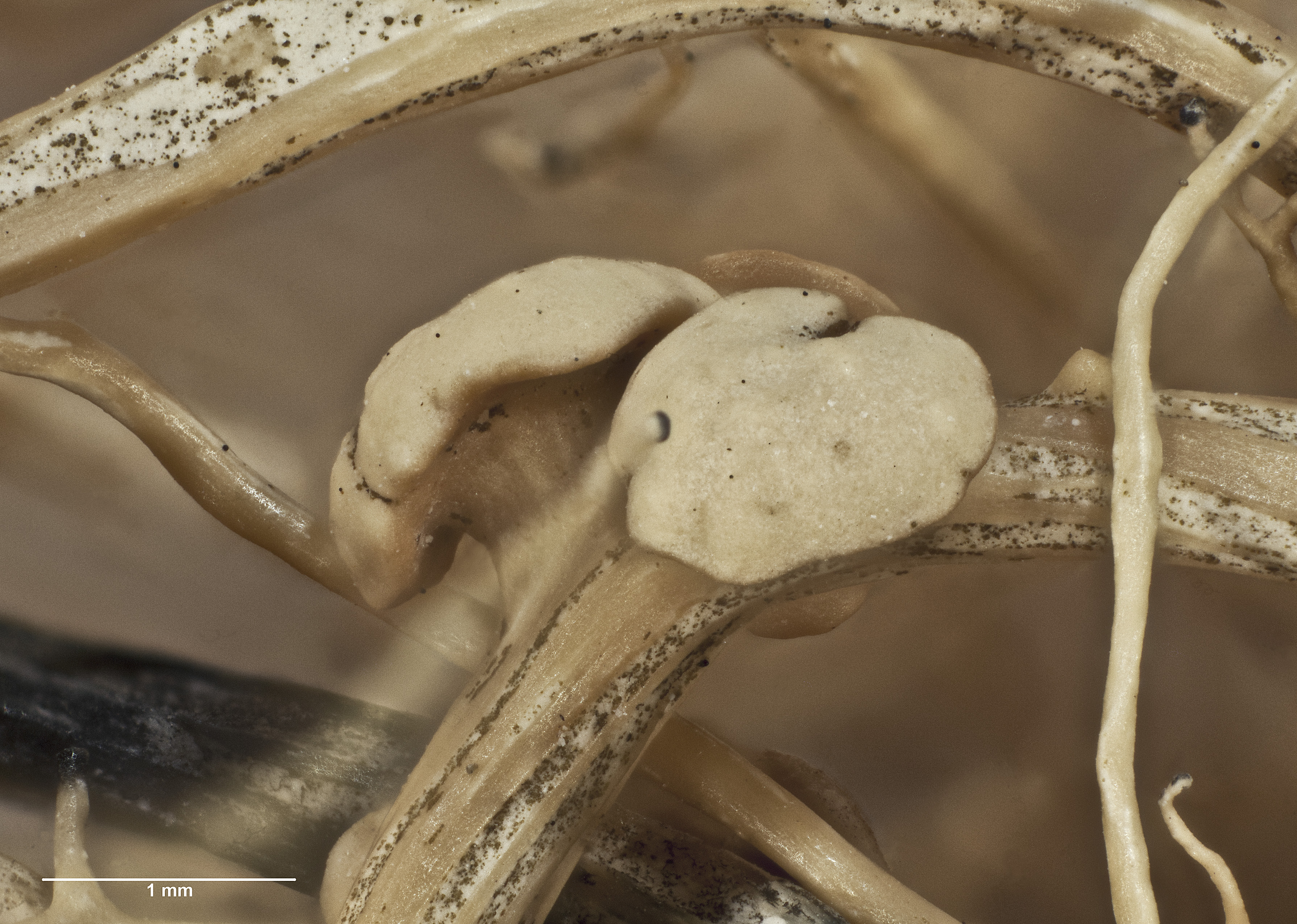

== See also ==
- List of Ramalina species
