= Ramalina ketner-oostrae =

Scientific classification
- Kingdom: Fungi
- Division: Ascomycota
- Class: Lecanoromycetes
- Order: Lecanorales
- Family: Ramalinaceae
- Genus: Ramalina
- Species: R. ketner-oostrae

Binomial name
- Ramalina ketner-oostrae Aptroot (2008)

Species of lichen-forming fungus

Ramalina ketner-oostrae is a species of saxicolous (rock-dwelling), fruticose lichen in the family Ramalinaceae. It is found in the remote tropical island of Saint Helena, where it occurs on cliffs. It was formally described as a new species in 2008 by Dutch lichenologist André Aptroot. The type specimen was collected by the author south of Gregory's Battery at an elevation of 300 m (980 ft); there, it was found growing on basalt. The fruticose thallus of the lichen becomes pendant with age, reaching lengths of up to 12 cm (4.7 in), although typically it is smaller, up to 7 cm (2.8 in). The branches are thin, flattened, papery, and fan-shaped (flabellate) in outline, lacking pseudocyphellae. Thin-layer chromatography shows that the species contains usnic acid and usually also norstictic acid and connorstictic acid. The photobiont partner is dispersed in irregular groups throughout the medulla. The species epithet honours the Dutch lichenologist and ecologist Rita Ketner-Oostra.

== See also ==
- List of Ramalina species
