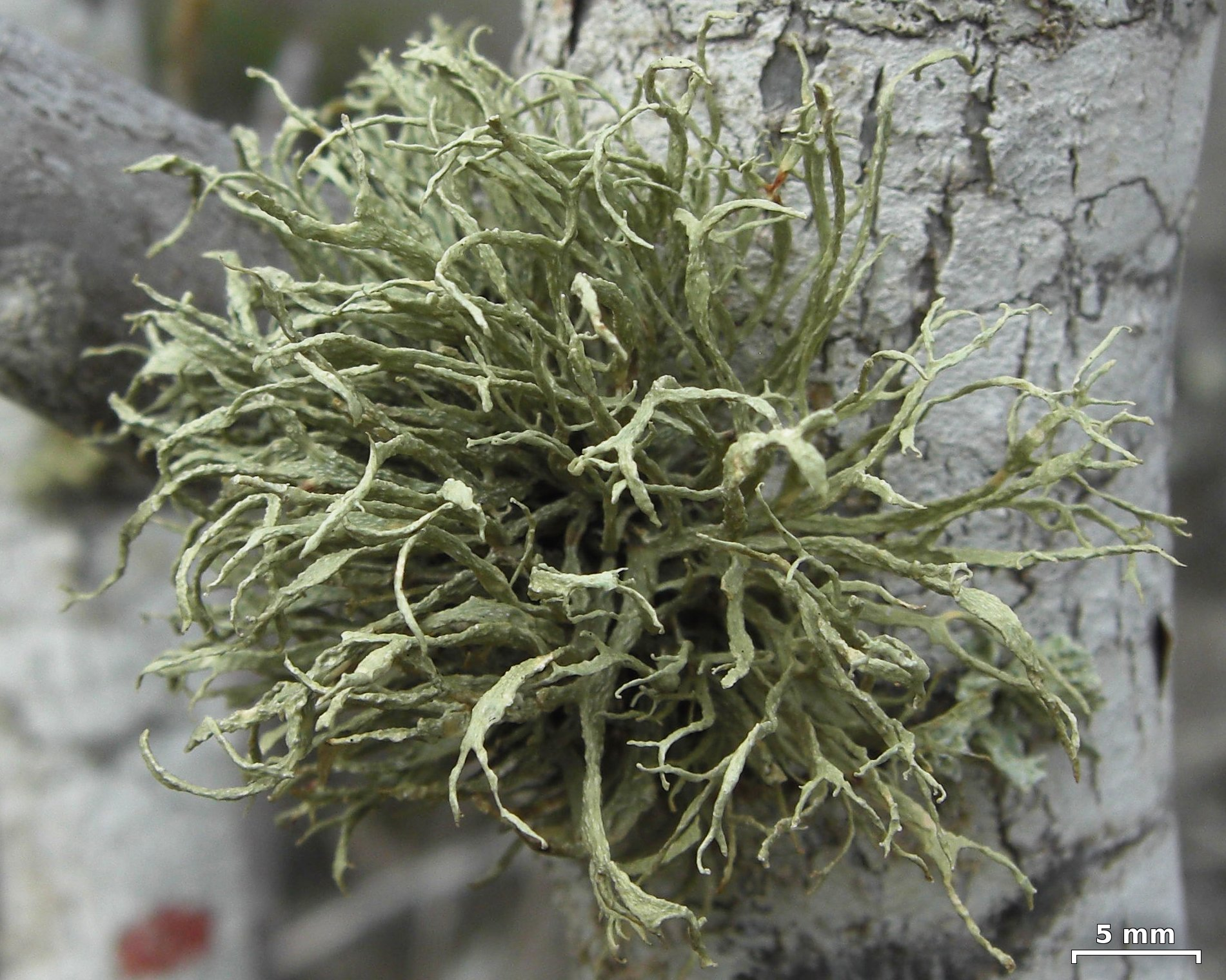

Scientific classification
- Kingdom: Fungi
- Division: Ascomycota
- Class: Lecanoromycetes
- Order: Lecanorales
- Family: Ramalinaceae
- Genus: Ramalina
- Species: R. sideriza

Binomial name
- Ramalina sideriza Zahlbr. (1911)

= Ramalina sideriza =

Species of lichen-forming fungus

Ramalina sideriza is a species of strap lichen in the family Ramalinaceae, first described by the German lichenologist Alexander Zahlbruckner in 1911 from Hawaiian specimens. It has since been identified in the Galápagos Islands, where it is a common epiphyte in coastal and arid zones. This shrubby lichen is characterised by its flattened thallus lobes with curled tips, a striate surface with distinct parallel ridges, and smooth apothecia (fruiting bodies). While primarily growing on bark or wood, it occasionally occurs on rocks. The species can be distinguished from similar Ramalina species by its unique morphology and chemical composition, including the presence of salazinic acid in its medulla.

== Taxonomy ==
Ramalina sideriza was formally described as a new species in 1911 by the German lichenologist Alexander Zahlbruckner. Joseph Rock collected the type specimens from tree branches in Parker Ranch in Hawaii. Zahlbruckner summarised his thoughts about the lichen: "Ramalina sideriza is best considered as a subspecies of Ramalina denticulata (Eschw.) Nyl. The distinguishing features of our lichen must be highlighted as the broad primary sections of the thallus, the more smoothed surface that is only slightly or not at all striated, covered with very few white soredia or without soredia, the almost smooth, not warty and not reticulate-wrinkled exciple of the apothecium, and the curved spores."

The species was later identified in the Galápagos Islands, where it is a common epiphyte in coastal and arid zones. However, the Galápagos specimens show some differences from their Hawaiian counterparts as distributed under Zahlbruckner, Krypt. Exs. no. 1876. While the Hawaiian specimens typically have marginal apothecia (reproductive structures) and a more pronounced geniculate growth (resembling bent knees), the Galápagos specimens generally display laminal apothecia (i.e., fruiting bodies throughout the thallus surface, rather than concentrated at the margins) and are only partially geniculate. These distinctions have led researchers to suggest that further comparisons with R. sideriza samples from other locations may be necessary to confirm the identity of the Galápagos population.

== Description ==
The lichen is characterised by its shrubby thallus with flattened lobes that are not (canaliculate). The lobe tips are often curled backwards, resembling shepherds' crooks. Its surface is conspicuously striate, developing distinct parallel ridges that abrade into broadened, linear pseudocyphellae. Unlike some similar species, the lower surface of its apothecia is relatively smooth and not tuberculate or ridged.

In terms of chemical spot tests, the medulla of R. sideriza reacts K+ yellow, slowly turning red, indicating the presence of salazinic acid. The cortex contains usnic acid and sometimes atranorin.

This species can be distinguished from the similar R. complanata by its conspicuously striate lobe surface, curled lobe tips, and smooth lower surface of the apothecia.

== Habitat and distribution ==
In the Galápagos, R. sideriza is primarily corticolous (bark-dwelling) or lignicolous, growing on the bark or wood of trees and shrubs. It is occasionally found growing on rocks. The species is common throughout the coastal and arid zones of the islands. It has been recorded from Española, Floreana, Genovesa, Isabela, San Cristóbal, Santa Cruz, Santa Fé, and Santiago islands.

== See also ==
- List of Ramalina species
