= Ramalina erosa =

Conservation status
- Vulnerable (IUCN 3.1)

Scientific classification
- Kingdom: Fungi
- Division: Ascomycota
- Class: Lecanoromycetes
- Order: Lecanorales
- Family: Ramalinaceae
- Genus: Ramalina
- Species: R. erosa

Binomial name
- Ramalina erosa Krog (1990)

Species of lichen-forming fungus

Ramalina erosa is a species of fruticose lichen in the family Ramalinaceae. It was described as a new species by Hildur Krog in 1990. The type specimen was collected from Pico do Facho on Porto Santo Island (Portugal), where it was found growing on acidic rock at an elevation of 500 m (1,600 ft).

The lichen grows as bushy tufts, up to 6 cm (2.4 in) high, ascending from a 2–4 mm diameter holdfast on the rock substrate. The branching pattern is either dichotomous (divided into two parts) or irregular. The laciniae (long, slender, thallus lobes characteristic of genus Ramalina) are typically 0.4–3 mm wide and taper gradually to blunt tips. The base of the thallus has linear pseudocyphellae (minute pores that facilitate gas exchange). Soralia are oval-shaped and arranged in a lateral fashion on the thallus surface. They produce coarse granules, measuring about 200 μm, which often have short branches with hook-shaped tips. Secondary chemicals present in the lichen include divaricatic acid, triterpenoids, and a trace of usnic acid.

Ramalina erosa is found on the exposed rock faces of old volcanoes on Porto Santo Island, and is often growing with other more dominant Ramalina species. It occurs in only two rocky outcrops at altitudes of 300 metres (980 ft) to 400 metres (1,300 ft). Because of the relatively small population estimate (500 to 1000 individuals) and its restricted distribution, in 2024 the lichen was assessed as vulnerable on the IUCN Red List of Threatened Species.

== See also ==
- List of Ramalina species
