= List of Ramalina species =

This is a list of species in Ramalina, a genus of fruticose lichens. As of February 2026, Species Fungorum (in the Catalogue of Life) accepts 281 species of Ramalina.

== A ==
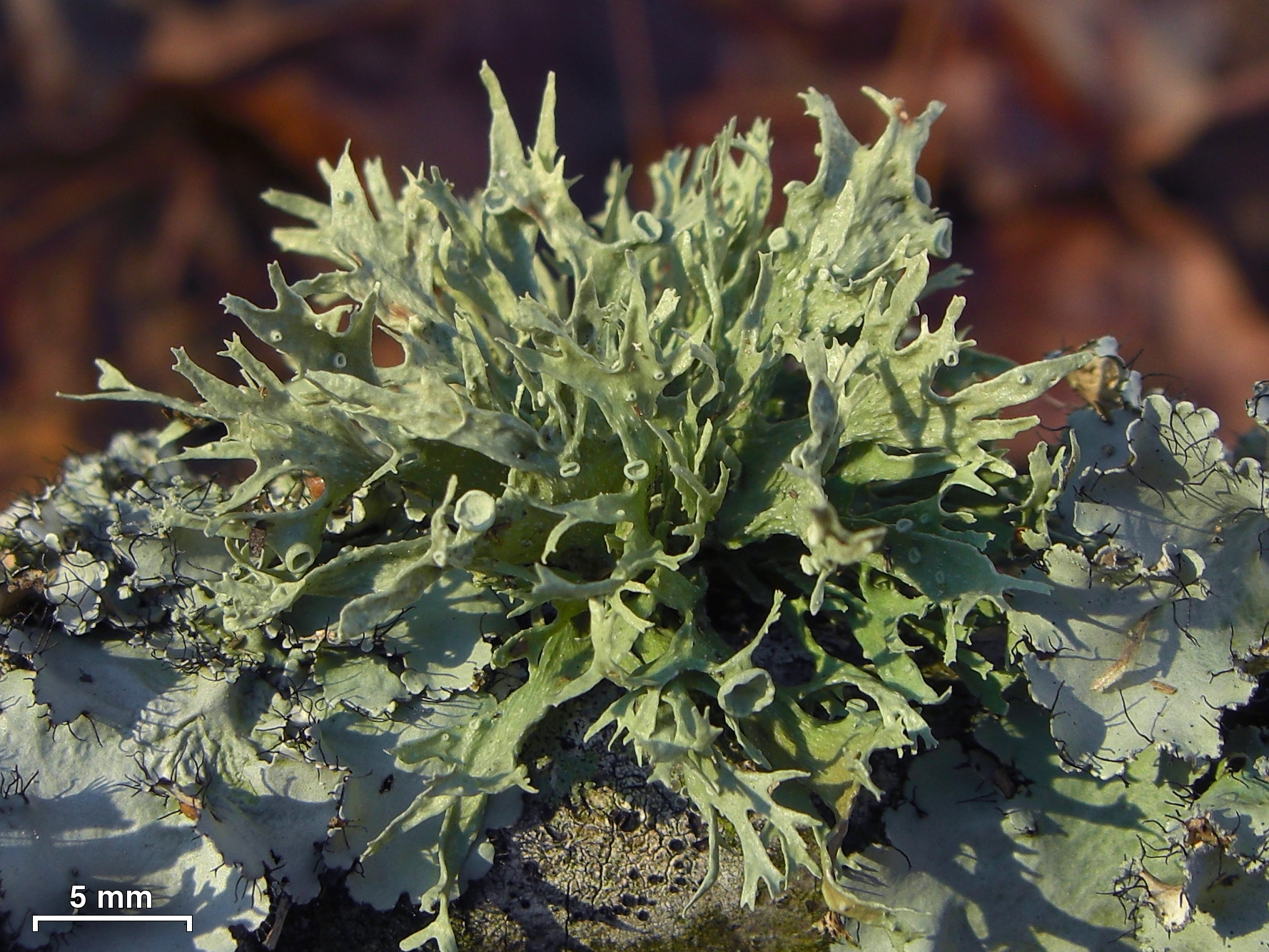
Ramalina americana

- Ramalina abyssinica Nyl. (1870)
- Ramalina ahtii Kashiw. & T.H.Nash (1994) – Mexico
- Ramalina ailaoshanensis S.Y.Guo & L.F.Han (2021) – China
- Ramalina alisiosae Pérez-Vargas & Pérez-Ort. (2013) – Canary Islands
- Ramalina americana Hale (1979) – North America
- Ramalina andina V.Marcano & A.Morales (1994) – Venezuela
- Ramalina anisitsiana Gyeln. (1931)
- Ramalina anteojina A.Morales & V.Marcano (2021)
- Ramalina arabum (Dill. ex Ach.) Meyen & Flot. (1843)
- Ramalina arbuscula Stizenb. (1890)
- Ramalina arsenii Sérus., van den Boom & Magain (2021) – Europe
- Ramalina asahinana Zahlbr. (1927)
- Ramalina aspera Räsänen (1944)
- Ramalina asperula Kremp. (1876)
- Ramalina aulota Stirt. (1874)
- Ramalina australiensis Nyl. (1870)
- Ramalina azorica Aptroot & Schumm (2008) – Azores

== B ==
- Ramalina banzarensis C.W.Dodge (1948)
- Ramalina bermudana Stirt. (1874)
- Ramalina bicolor Müll.Arg. (1877)
- Ramalina bigeniculata B.de Lesd. (1913)
- Ramalina bistorta Nyl. (1870)
- Ramalina boninensis Asahina (1938)
- Ramalina boulhautiana Maheu & A.Gillet (1925)
- Ramalina bourgaeana Mont. ex Nyl. (1870)
- Ramalina brevis F.Wilson (1889)
- Ramalina breviuscula (Nyl.) Nyl. (1872)

== C ==
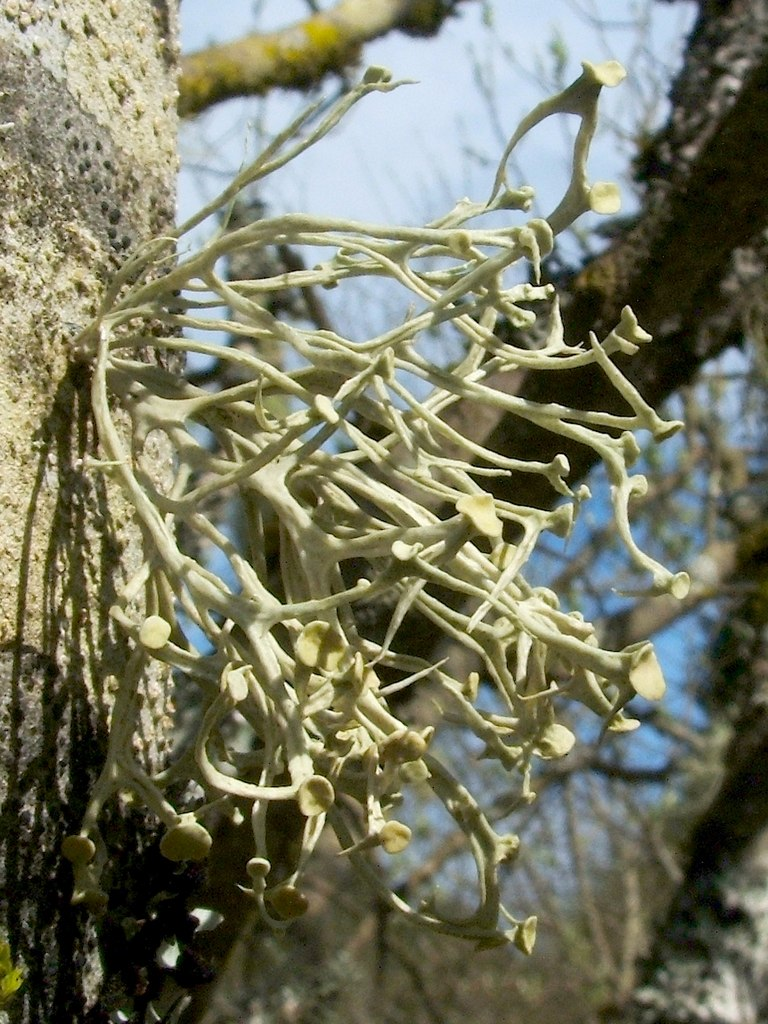
Ramalina calicaris

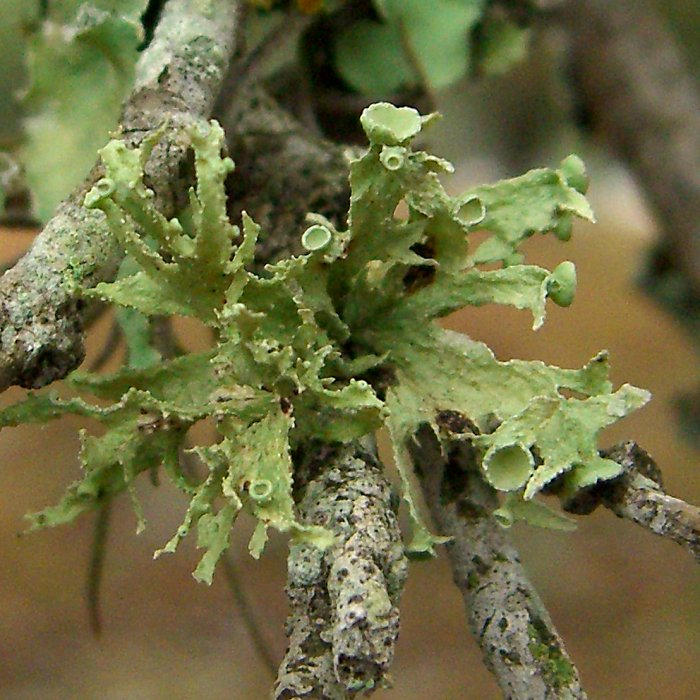
Ramalina complanata

- Ramalina caespitella G.N.Stevens (1986) – Australia
- Ramalina caespitosa H.Magn. (1955)
- Ramalina calcarata Krog & Swinscow (1974) – East Africa
- Ramalina calicaris (L.) Röhl. (1813)
- Ramalina camptospora Nyl. (1870)
- Ramalina canaguensis V.Marcano & A.Morales (1994)
- Ramalina canalicularis (Nyl.) Kashiw. (2004)
- Ramalina canariensis J.Steiner (1904)
- Ramalina cannonii Elix, Laily & Samsudin (1991) – Peninsular Malaysia
- Ramalina capensis Th.Fr. (1861)
- Ramalina capitata (Ach.) Nyl. (1872)
- Ramalina caracasana Müll.Arg. (1877)
- Ramalina carminae R.Arroyo & Seriñá (2011)
- Ramalina celastri (Spreng.) A.Massal. (1861)
- Ramalina ceratea Werner (1954)
- Ramalina cerinella Zahlbr. (1945)
- Ramalina cerinelloides H.Magn. (1955)
- Ramalina chiguarensis V.Marcano & A.Morales (1994) – Venezuela
- Ramalina chihuahuana Kashiw. & T.H.Nash (2002) – Mexico
- Ramalina chondrina J.Steiner (1904)
- Ramalina cinereovirens Kashiw., K.H.Moon & J.E.Han (2021) – South Korea
- Ramalina clementeana Llimona & Werner (1975)
- Ramalina cochlearis Zahlbr. (1905)
- Ramalina commixta Asahina (1939)
- Ramalina conduplicans Vain. (1921)
- Ramalina confirmata (Nyl.) Zahlbr. (1930)
- Ramalina confusa D.D.Awasthi (2006)
- Ramalina congesta Kashiw., K.H.Moon & J.E.Han (2023) – Japan, Korea
- Ramalina continentalis Malme (1935)
- Ramalina controversa Sbarbaro (1955)
- Ramalina coreana Kashiw. & K.H.Moon (2002) – Southeast Asia
- Ramalina corsicana Zahlbr. (1927)
- Ramalina corymbosa (Hue) Kotlov (2004)
- Ramalina costata Meyen & Flot. (1843)
- Ramalina cribrosa De Not. (1846)
- Ramalina crispata V.Marcano & A.Morales (1994) – Venezuela
- Ramalina culbersoniorum LaGreca (2000)
- Ramalina cumanensis Fée (1825)
- Ramalina cuspidata (Ach.) Nyl. (1870)

== D ==
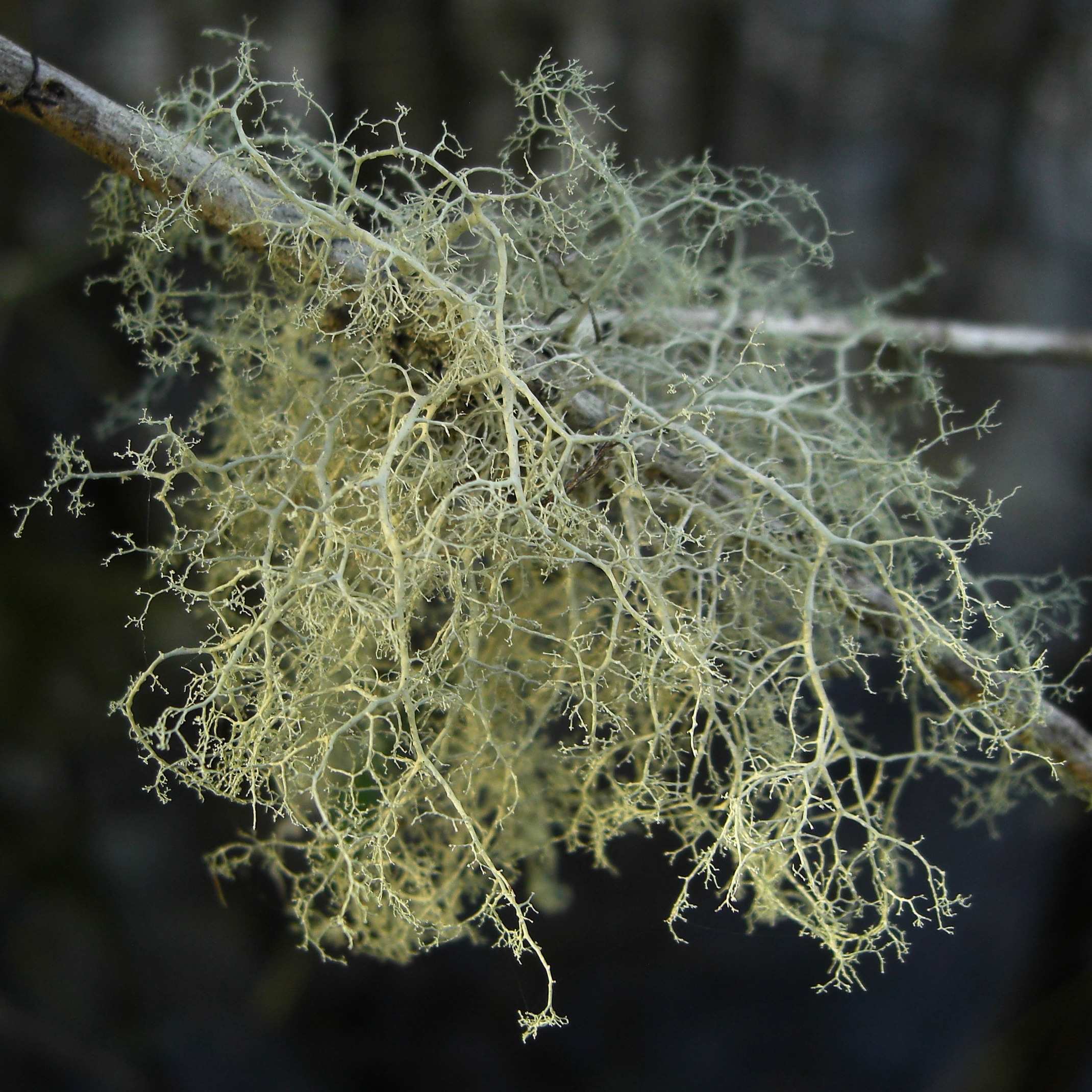
Ramalina dasypoga

- Ramalina dalmatica J.Steiner & Zahlbr. (1903)
- Ramalina darwiniana Aptroot & Bungartz (2007) – Galapagos
- Ramalina dasypoga Tuck. (1859)
- Ramalina debrecenensis Gyeln. (1932)
- Ramalina deliblatensis Gyeln. (1932)
- Ramalina delicata Blázquez, Pérez-Vargas & Pérez-Ort. (2024)
- Ramalina dendriscoidella Vain. (1926)
- Ramalina dendriscoides Nyl. (1876)
- Ramalina desolata H.Magn. (1942)
- Ramalina dichotoma Hepp (1854)
- Ramalina dictyota C.W.Dodge & Vareschi (1956)
- Ramalina digitata Meyen & Flot. (1843)
- Ramalina dilacerata (Hoffm.) Hoffm. (1825)
- Ramalina disciformis Kashiw., K.H.Moon & J.E.Han (2023) – Japan
- Ramalina disparata Krog & Swinscow (1976) – Africa
- Ramalina dissecta Kashiw. (1988)
- Ramalina dissimilis Krog (2000) – Tanzania
- Ramalina dumeticola Krog & Swinscow (1976) – Africa

== E ==
- Ramalina ecklonii (Spreng.) Meyen & Flot. (1843)
- Ramalina elegans (Bagl. & Carestia) Jatta (1909)
- Ramalina erosa Krog (1990)
- Ramalina erumpens Blanchon, Braggins & Alison Stewart (1996) – Australia, New Zealand
- Ramalina erythrantha Müll.Arg. (1879)
- Ramalina escorialensis V.Marcano & A.Morales (1994)
- Ramalina euphorbiae Vain. (1901)
- Ramalina europaea Gasparyan, Sipman & Lücking (2017) – Europe
- Ramalina exiguella Stirt. (1881)
- Ramalina exilis Asahina (1939) – Japan
- Ramalina extenuata H.Magn. (1955)

== F ==
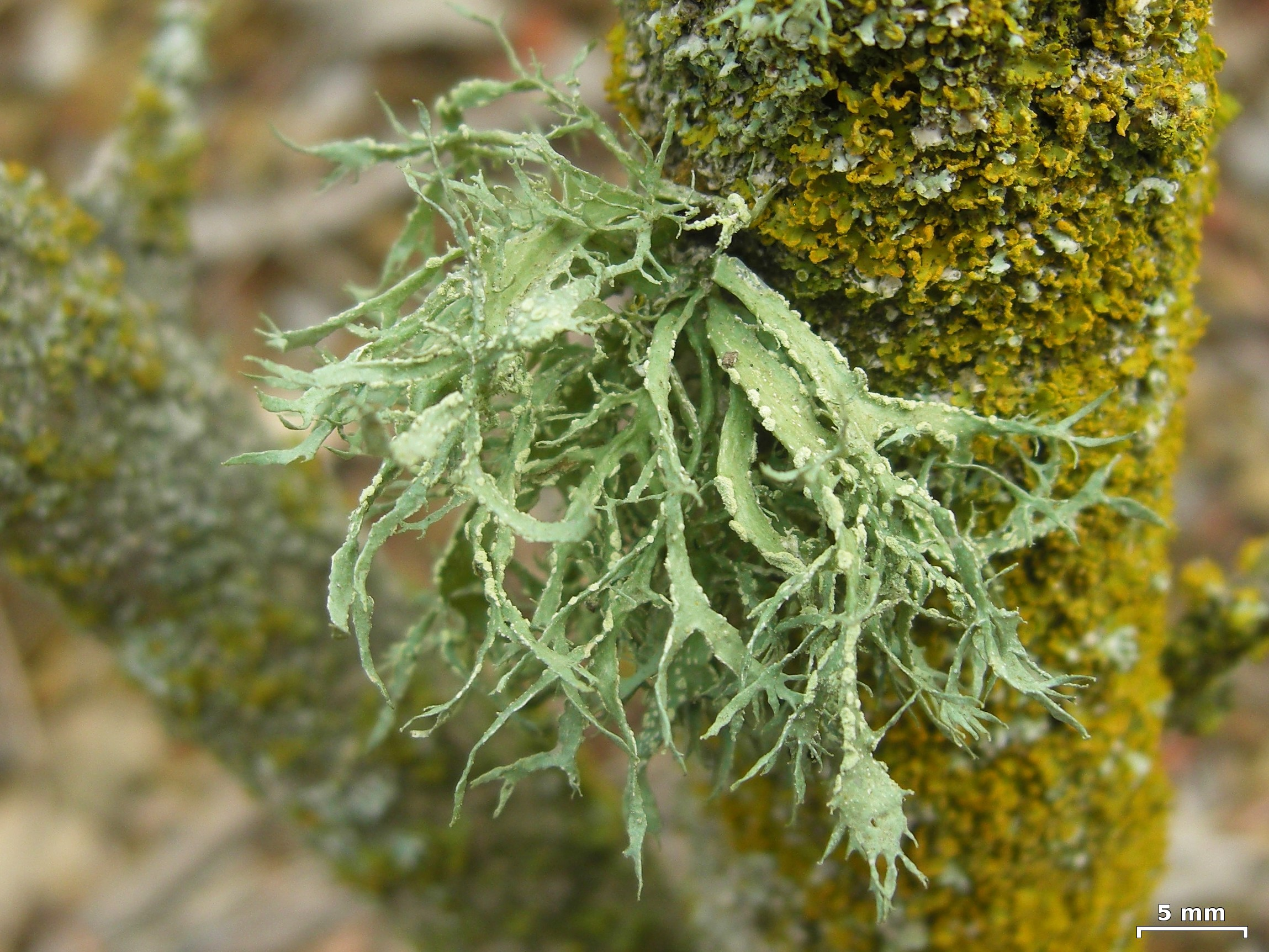
Ramalina farinacea

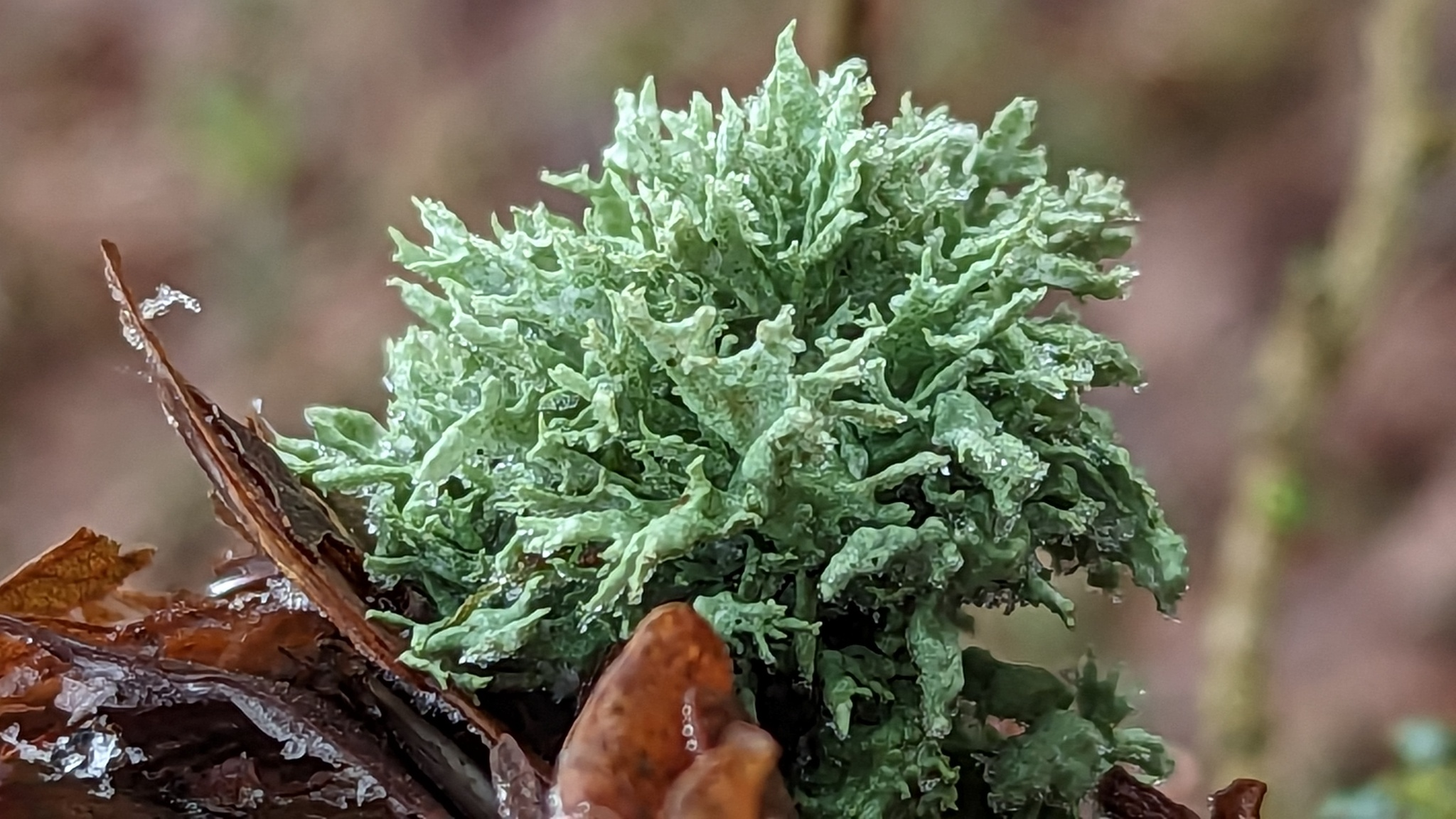
Ramalina fastigiata

- Ramalina fallax Motyka (1961)
- Ramalina farinacea (L.) Ach. (1810)
- Ramalina fasciata Kremp. (1876)
- Ramalina fastigiata (Pers.) Ach. (1810)
- Ramalina fastigiatofraxinea Hue (1898)
- Ramalina faurieana Zahlbr. (1945)
- Ramalina fecunda Krog & Swinscow (1976) – Africa
- Ramalina feldmannii Faurel, Ozenda & Schotter (1952)
- Ramalina fennica Räsänen (1931)
- Ramalina filicaulis G.N.Stevens (1987) – Australia
- Ramalina fimbriata Krog & Swinscow (1974) – East Africa
- Ramalina finkii Zahlbr. (1930)
- Ramalina fissa (Müll.Arg.) Vain. (1900)
- Ramalina flabelliformis Asahina (1955)
- Ramalina flaccidissima Bory (1826)
- Ramalina flagellifera Vain. (1890)
- Ramalina fleigiae Gumboski, Eliasaro & R.M.Silveira (2018)
- Ramalina floccosa Delile (1870)
- Ramalina foliosa Räsänen (1931)
- Ramalina fontqueri Maheu (1928)
- Ramalina fortunatarum Blázquez, Pérez-Vargas & Pérez-Ort. (2024)
- Ramalina fragilis Aptroot & Bungartz (2007) – Galapagos
- Ramalina fragilissima Krog (1983)
- Ramalina fraxinea (L.) Ach. (1810)
- Ramalina furcellangulida Aptroot (2007) – Galapagos

== G ==
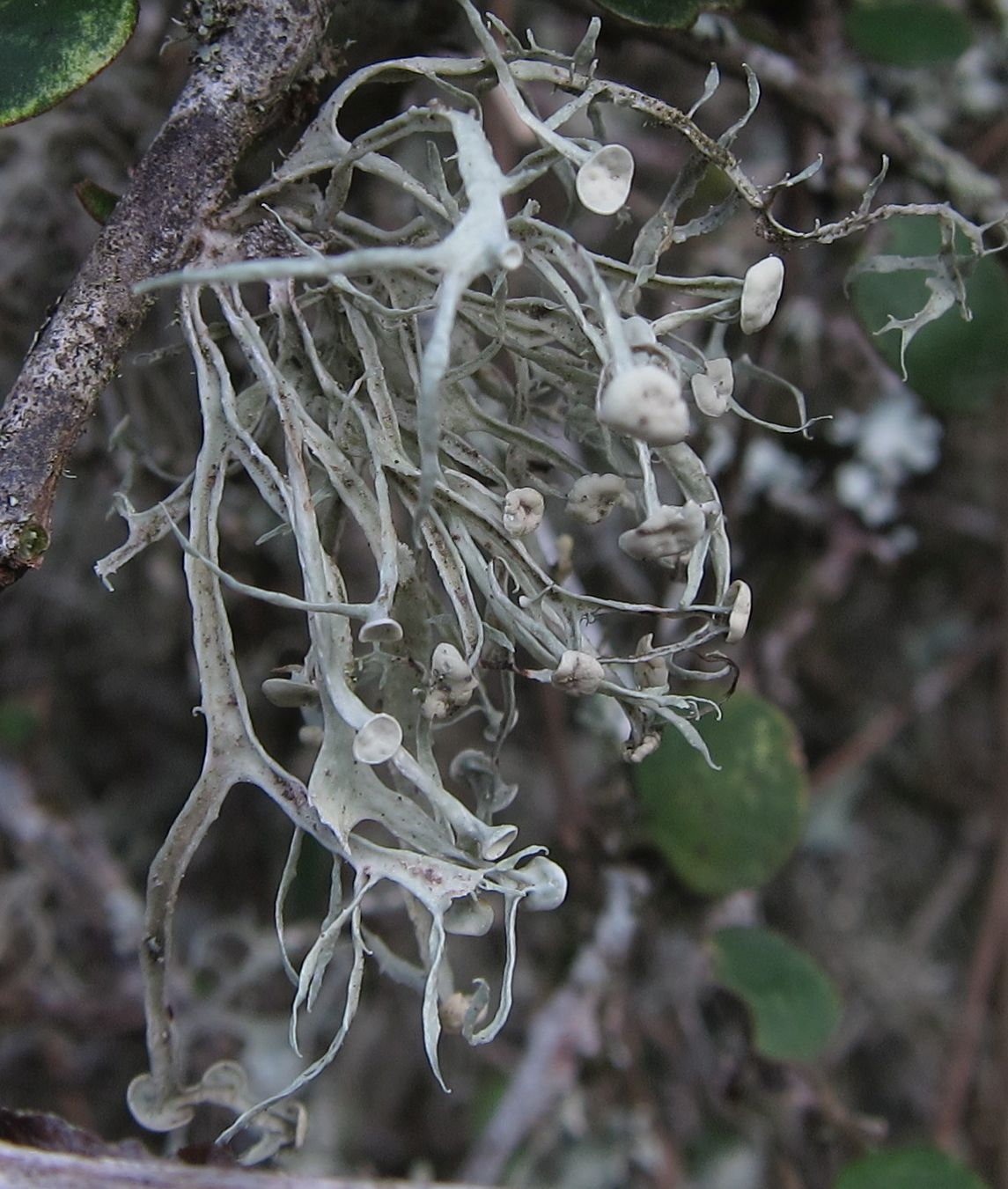
Ramalina glaucescens

- Ramalina gallowayi Kashiw., T.H.Nash & K.H.Moon (2007)
- Ramalina geniculatella Aptroot (2008) – Saint Helena
- Ramalina glaucescens Kremp. (1881)
- Ramalina gloriosensis R.Poncet (2021) – Scattered Islands
- Ramalina gomerana Blázquez, Pérez-Vargas & Pérez-Ort. (2024)
- Ramalina grappae Sambo (1936)
- Ramalina grumosa Kashiw. (1987)

== H ==
- Ramalina hengduanshanensis S.O.Oh & Li S.Wang (2014)
- Ramalina himalayensis Räsänen (1950)
- Ramalina hioramii B.de Lesd. (1934)
- Ramalina hivertiana R.Poncet (2021) – Scattered Islands
- Ramalina hoehneliana Müll.Arg. (1890)
- Ramalina hokkaidensis Kashiw. (1986)
- Ramalina hossei Vain. (1921)
- Ramalina huei Harm. (1911)
- Ramalina hypodectodes (Nyl.) Zahlbr. (1930)
- Ramalina hyrcana Sipman (2011)

== I ==
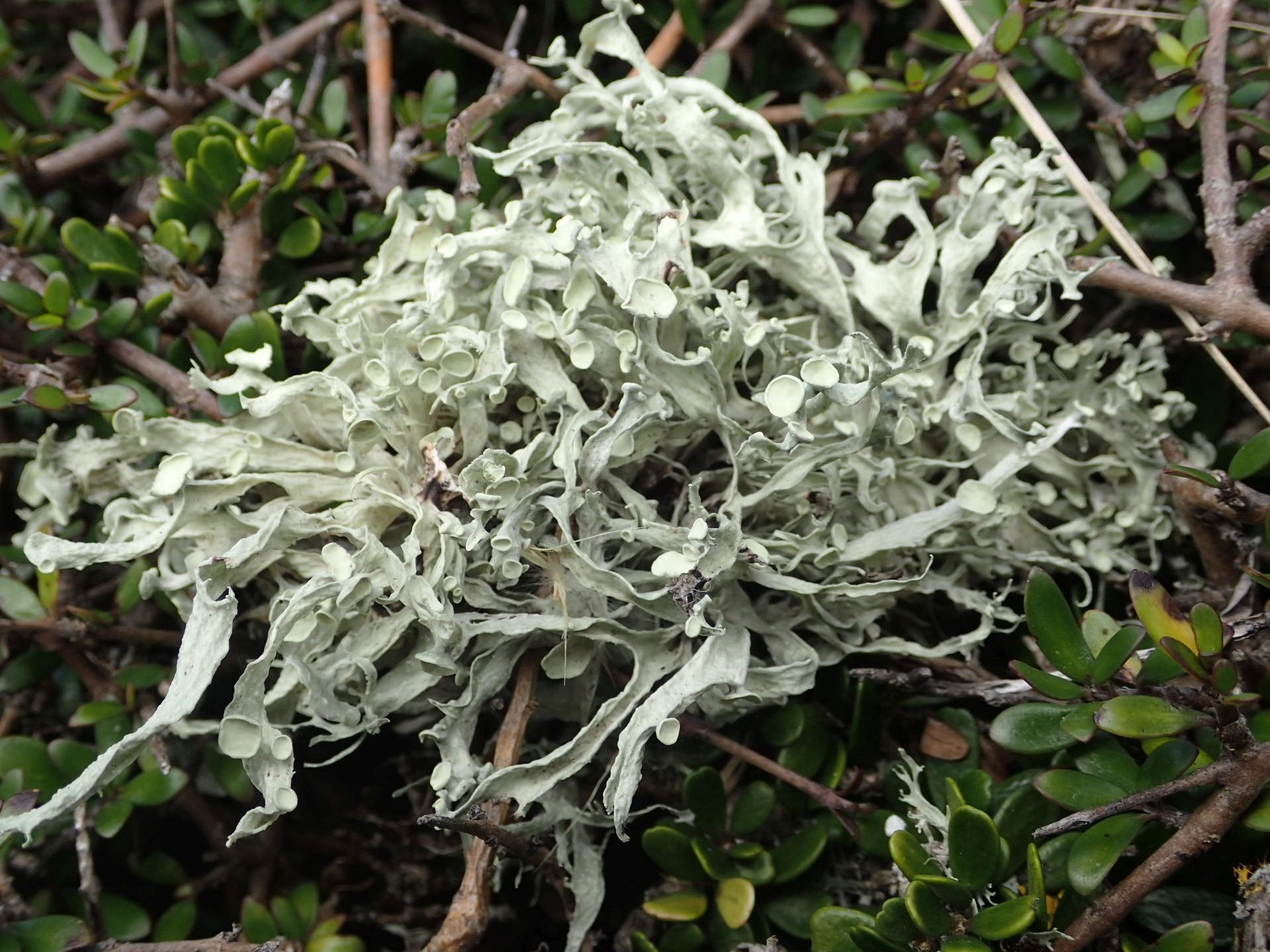
Ramalina inflexa

- Ramalina implectens Nyl. (1870)
- Ramalina implexa (Nyl.) Krog (1994)
- Ramalina inaequalis Nyl. (1870)
- Ramalina incana Kashiw. (1987)
- Ramalina inclinata Kashiw., K.H.Moon & M.J.Lai (2006) – Taiwan
- Ramalina incurvescens H.Magn. (1955)
- Ramalina indica Fr. (1820)
- Ramalina inflata (Hook.f. & Taylor) Hook.f. & Taylor (1845)
- Ramalina inflexa Blanchon, Braggins & Alison Stewart (1996) – New Zealand
- Ramalina insularum H.Magn. (1955)
- Ramalina intermedia (Delise ex Nyl.) Nyl. (1873)?
- Ramalina intermediella Vain. (1921)
- Ramalina intermixta Gyeln. (1932)
- Ramalina interponens (Nyl.) Zahlbr. (1930)
- Ramalina intestiniformis Kashiw. & K.H.Moon (2016) – Korea

== J ==
- Ramalina jamesii Krog (1990)

== K ==
- Ramalina kardakovae Oxner (1940)
- Ramalina kazakhorum Oxner (1940)
- Ramalina ketner-oostrae Aptroot (2008) – Saint Helena
- Ramalina krogiae Guissard & Sérus. (2020) – Canary Islands
- Ramalina kurokawae Kashiw. (1996) – Japan
- Ramalina kuschei B.de Lesd. (1921)

== L ==
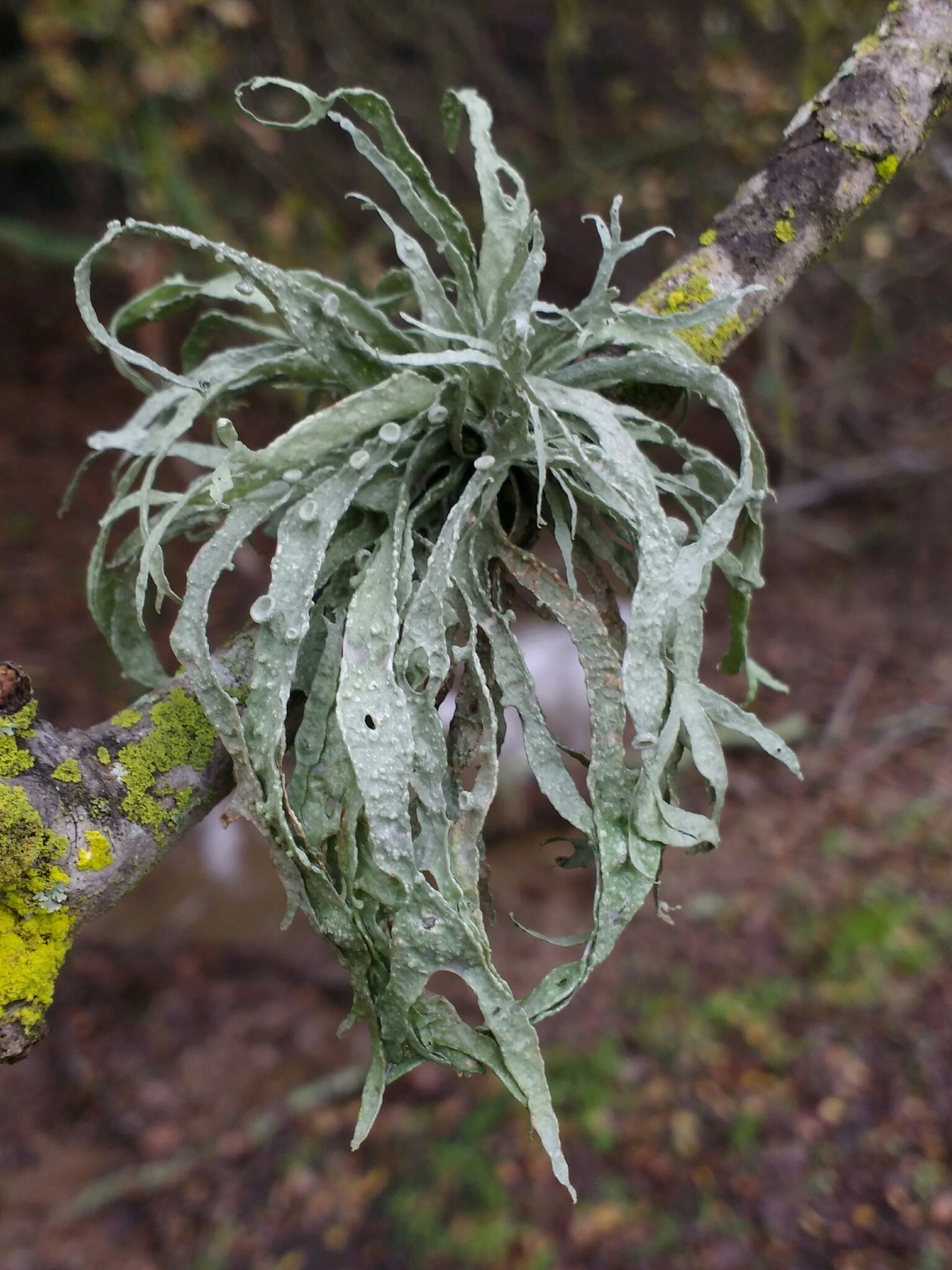
Ramalina leptocarpha

- Ramalina labiosorediata Gasparyan, Sipman & Lücking (2017) – North America
- Ramalina lacera (With.) J.R.Laundon (1984)
- Ramalina lacerata Müll.Arg. (1883)
- Ramalina laciniata Jatta (1903)
- Ramalina lafayettii Bory (1828)
- Ramalina lanceolata Nyl. (1870)
- Ramalina landroensis Zopf (1906)
- Ramalina latzelii Zahlbr. (1910)
- Ramalina lavicola H.Magn. (1945)
- Ramalina leiodea (Nyl.) Müll.Arg. (1883)
- Ramalina leptosperma Nyl. (1876)
- Ramalina leucosticta Taylor (1847)
- Ramalina litoralis Asahina (1939)
- Ramalina litorea G.N.Stevens (1986) – Australia
- Ramalina lojkana Motyka (1961)
- Ramalina lopezii V.Marcano & A.Morales (1994) – Venezuela
- Ramalina luciae Molho, Bodo, W.L.Culb. & C.F.Culb. (1981)
- Ramalina lusitanica H.Magn. (1956)
- Ramalina luxurians H.Magn. (1942)

== M ==
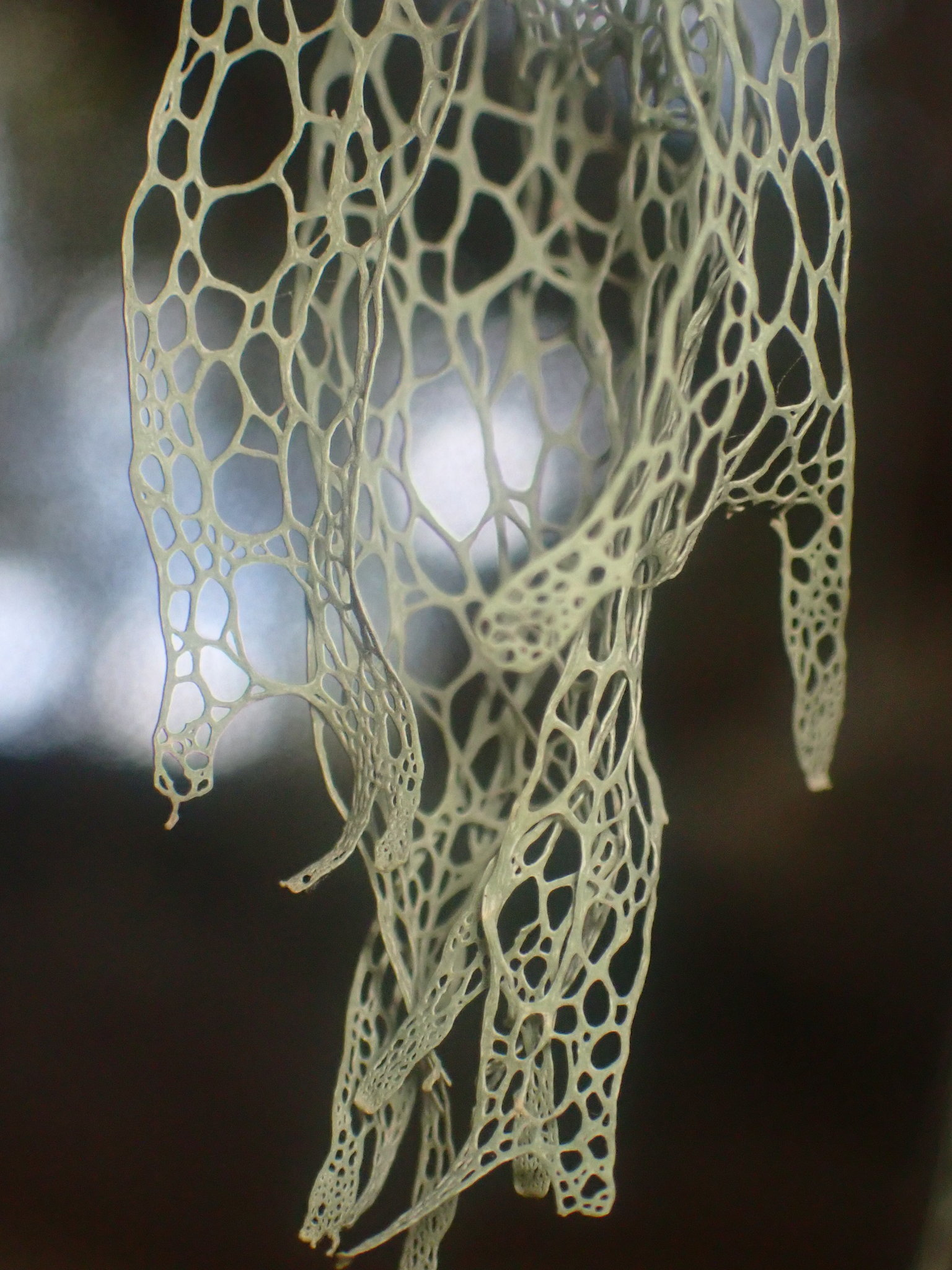
Ramalina menziesii

- Ramalina maciformis (Delile) Bory (1828)
- Ramalina macrospora Kashiw. (1987)
- Ramalina maculata Müll.Arg. (1877)
- Ramalina maderensis Motyka (1961)
- Ramalina maegdefraui V.Marcano & A.Morales (2021)
- Ramalina mahoneyi Quedensley & M.Véliz (2011)
- Ramalina maritima Krog & Swinscow (1976) – Africa
- Ramalina marteaui R.Poncet (2021) – Scattered Islands
- Ramalina mediterranea H.Magn. (1956)
- Ramalina membranacea Mont. (1839)
- Ramalina menziesii Taylor (1847)
- Ramalina meridionalis Blanchon & Bannister (2002) – Australia, New Zealand
- Ramalina mexicana Vain. (1926)
- Ramalina meyeri Stein (1888)
- Ramalina microphylla A.Morales & V.Marcano (1994) – Venezuela
- Ramalina microspora Kremp. (1876)
- Ramalina montagnei De Not. (1846)

== N ==
- Ramalina nervulosa (Müll.Arg.) Abbayes (1952)
- Ramalina nuda J.Steiner (1899)
- Ramalina nylanderiana Räsänen (1949)

== O ==
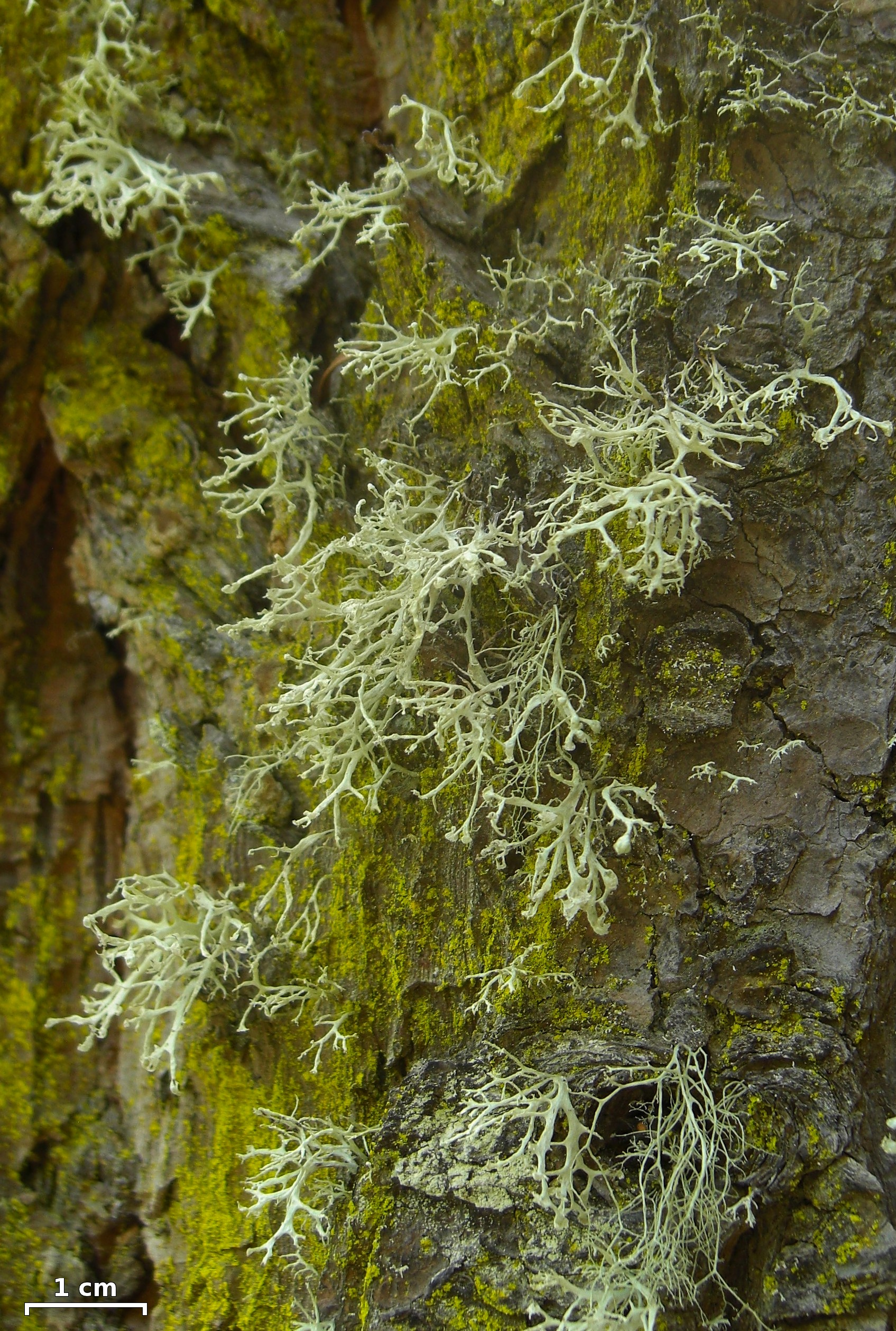
Ramalina obtusata

- Ramalina obtusata (Arnold) Bitter (1901)
- Ramalina osorioi Kashiw., T.H.Nash & K.H.Moon (2007)

== P ==
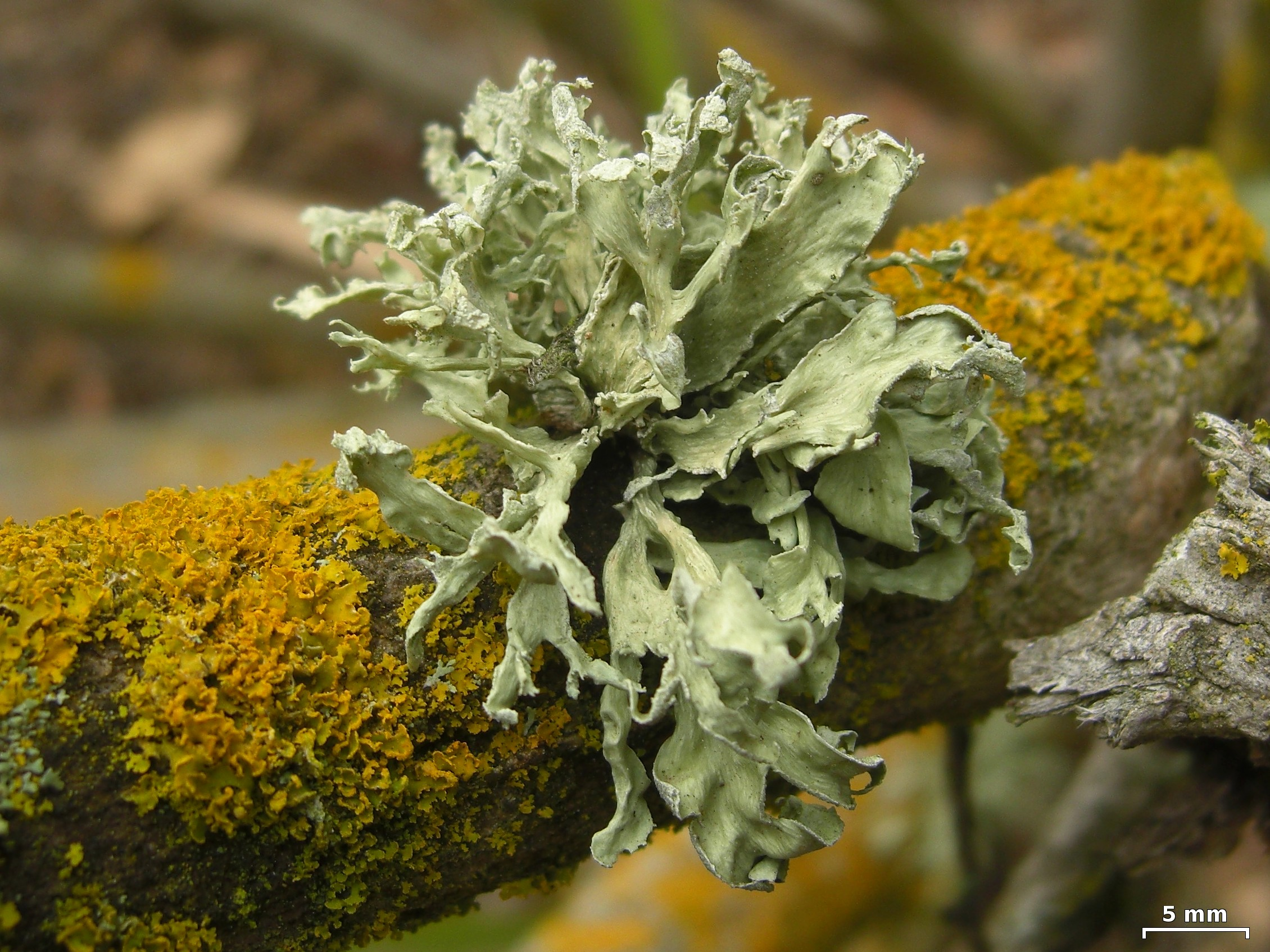
Ramalina pollinaria

- Ramalina pachyphloea J.Steiner (1904)
- Ramalina pacifica Asahina (1939) – Japan
- Ramalina palmiformis Kashiw. & T.H.Nash (1994) – Mexico
- Ramalina panizzii De Not. (1846)
- Ramalina papillifera J.Steiner (1907)
- Ramalina papyracea Blázquez, Pérez-Vargas & Pérez-Ort. (2024)
- Ramalina paradisensis A.Morales & V.Marcano (1995)
- Ramalina paraguayensis Gyeln. (1931)
- Ramalina patelliformis Kashiw. (1987)
- Ramalina pellucida Taylor (1847)
- Ramalina perlucens Hue (1899)
- Ramalina pertenuis H.Magn. (1945)
- Ramalina pertusa Kashiw. (1985)
- Ramalina peruviana Ach. (1810)
- Ramalina pichii Sambo (1941)
- Ramalina pilulifera Taylor (1847)
- Ramalina pollinaria (Westr.) Ach. (1810)
- Ramalina polyforma Aptroot (2007) – Galapagos
- Ramalina polymorpha (Lilj.) Ach. (1810)
- Ramalina portosantana Krog (1990)
- Ramalina portuensis Samp. (1924)
- Ramalina praetermissa Abbayes (1956)
- Ramalina prinii B.de Lesd. (1956)
- Ramalina pseudosekika Asahina (1941)
- Ramalina psoromica Kashiw. & T.H.Nash (2002) – Mexico
- Ramalina puberulenta Riefner & Bowler (1994)
- Ramalina puiggarii Müll.Arg. (1881)
- Ramalina pusilla Duby (1830)

== Q ==
- Ramalina qinlingensis S.Y.Guo & L.F.Han (2021) – China
- Ramalina quercicola Kashiw. & T.H.Nash (2004)

== R ==
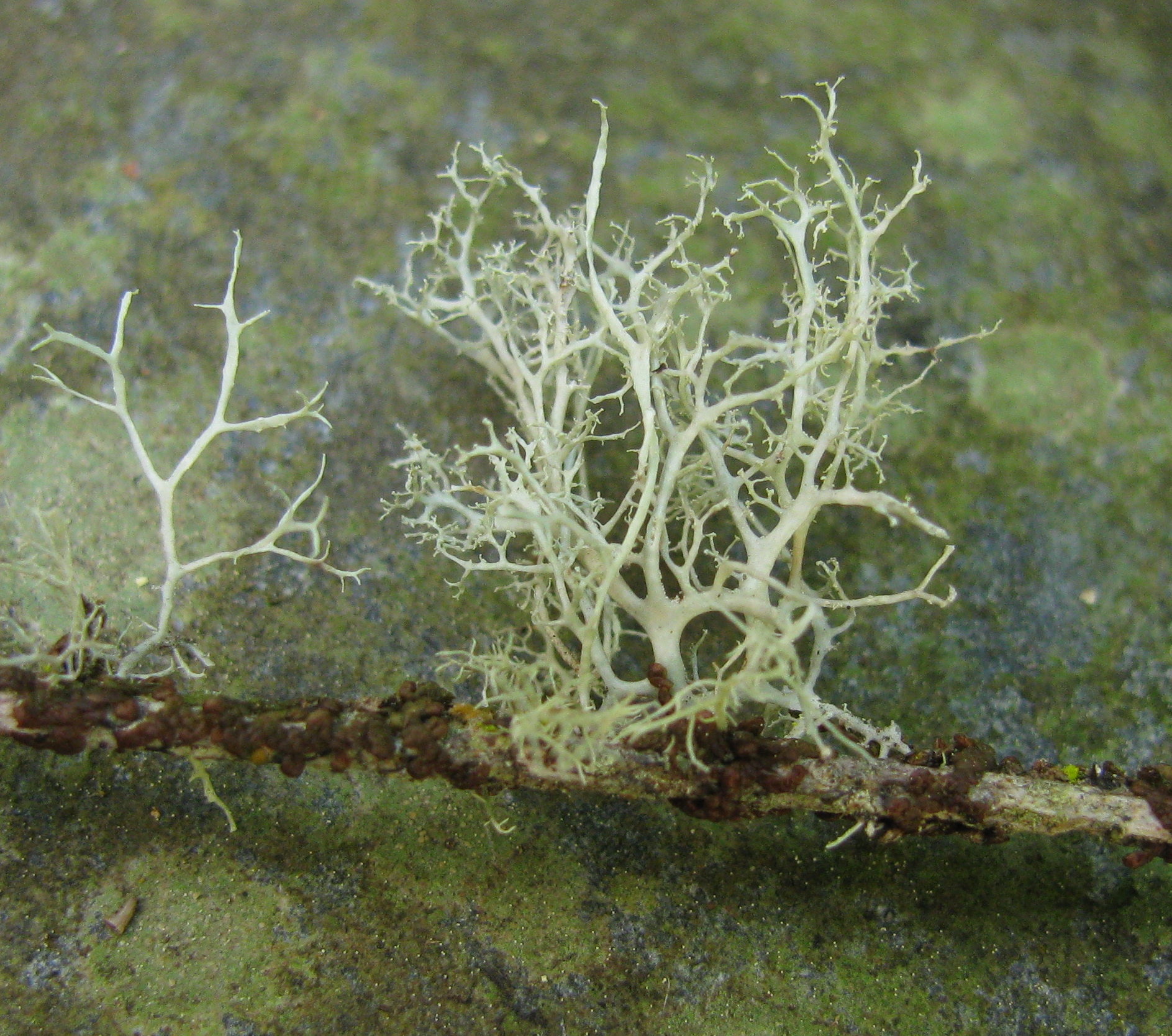
Ramalina roesleri

- Ramalina ramificans Seavey & J.Seavey (2017) – Florida
- Ramalina rectangularis Nyl. (1870)
- Ramalina reducta Krog & Swinscow (1976) – Africa
- Ramalina reptans Kashiw., C.W.Sm. & K.H.Moon (2002) – Hawaii
- Ramalina requienii (De Not.) Jatta (1892)
- Ramalina retiformis Menzies (1860)
- Ramalina rigidella Aptroot (2008) – Saint Helena
- Ramalina riparia Blanchon, Braggins & Alison Stewart (1996) – New Zealand
- Ramalina rjabuschinskii Savicz (1914)
- Ramalina roesleri (Schaer.) Nyl. (1870)
- Ramalina rosacea (A.Massal.) Hepp (1857)
- Ramalina ryukyuensis Kashiw. & K.H.Moon (2017) – Japan

== S ==
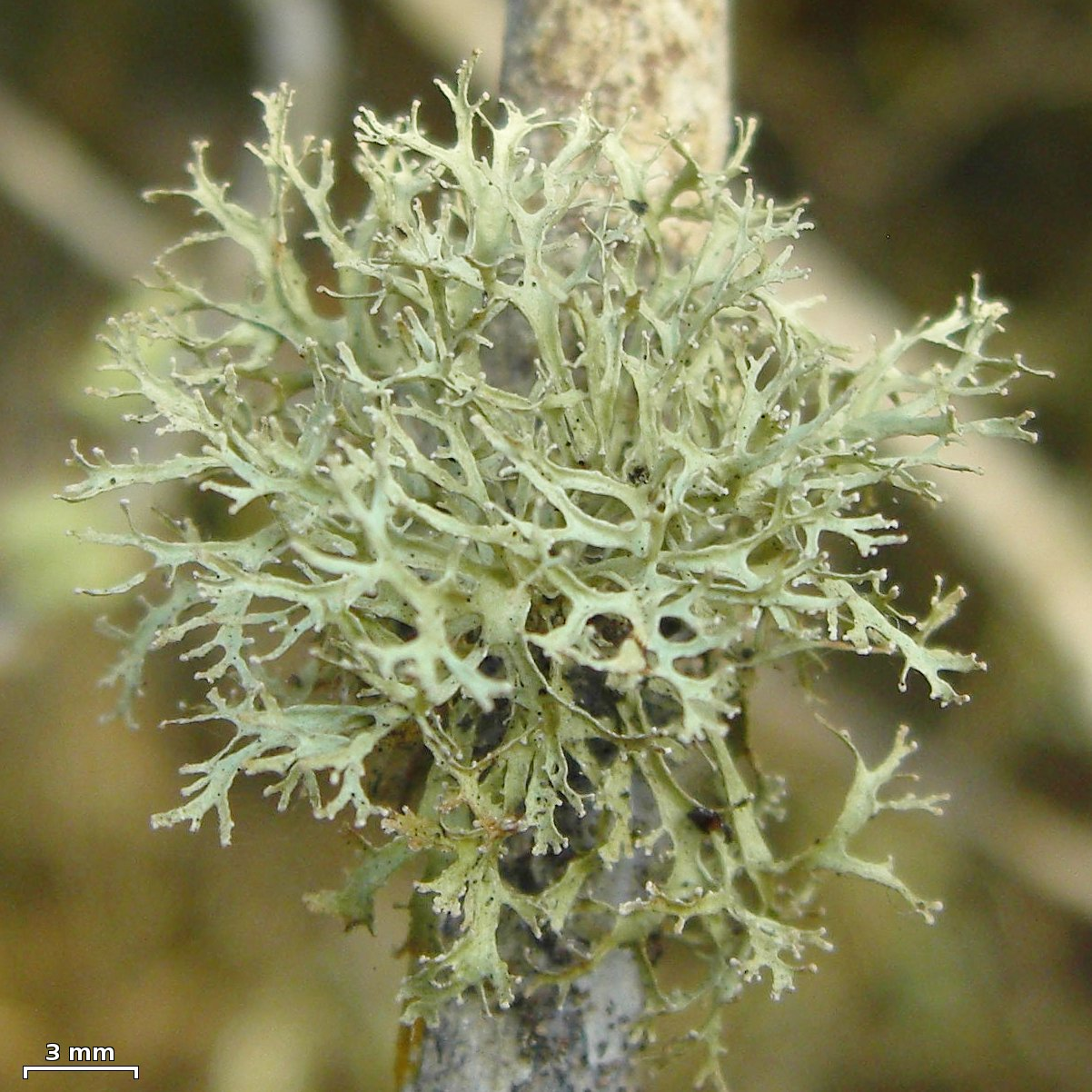
Ramalina sorediantha

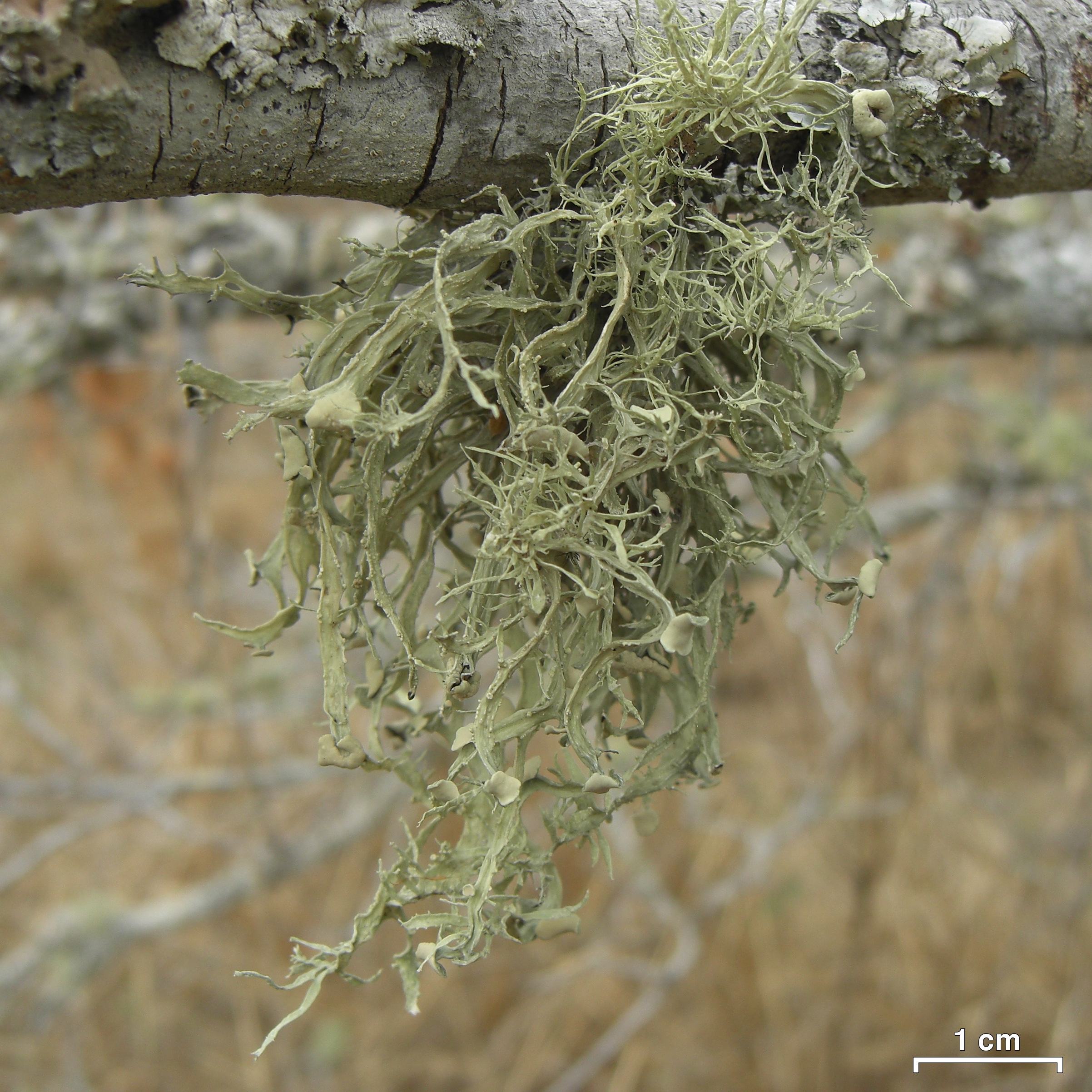
Ramalina stenospora

- Ramalina sabinosana Blázquez, Pérez-Vargas & Pérez-Ort. (2024)
- Ramalina sampaioana Blázquez, Pérez-Vargas & Pérez-Ort. (2024)
- Ramalina sanctae-helenae Aptroot (2008) – Saint Helena
- Ramalina sandwicensis Zahlbr. (1903)
- Ramalina santanensis V.Marcano & A.Morales (1994) – Venezuela
- Ramalina sarahae K.Knudsen, Lendemer & Kocourk. (2018) – Channel Islands (California)
- Ramalina saxicola Zahlbr. ex H.Magn. (1945)
- Ramalina scoriseda Zahlbr. (1914)
- Ramalina scrobiculata Müll.Arg. (1885)
- Ramalina seawardii Aptroot & Sipman (2001) – Hong Kong
- Ramalina sekika Asahina (1941)
- Ramalina semicuspidata (Räsänen) Sheard (1978)
- Ramalina shinanoana Kashiw. (1986)
- Ramalina sideriza Zahlbr. (1911)
- Ramalina siliquosa (Huds.) A.L.Sm. (1918)
- Ramalina similis H.Magn. (1945)
- Ramalina sinensis Jatta (1902)
- Ramalina sintenisii Müll.Arg. (1888)
- Ramalina sonorensis Kashiw. & T.H.Nash (1994) – Mexico
- Ramalina soraligera H.Magn. (1955)
- Ramalina sorediantha Nyl. (1870)
- Ramalina sphaerophora Kashiw. & K.H.Moon (2016) – Korea
- Ramalina stenospora Müll.Arg. (1877)
- Ramalina stevensiae Elix (1991) – Norfolk Island
- Ramalina stoffersii Sipman (2011)
- Ramalina strepsilis (Ach.) Zahlbr. (1894)
- Ramalina striatula Nees & Flot. (1835)
- Ramalina subasperata Nyl. (1876)
- Ramalina subbreviuscula Asahina (1939)
- Ramalina subcalcarata V.Marcano & A.Morales (2021)
- Ramalina subdecipiens J.Steiner (1904)
- Ramalina subdecumbens Kashiw., K.H.Moon & J.E.Han (2021) – South Korea
- Ramalina subfarinacea (Nyl. ex Cromb.) Nyl. (1873)
- Ramalina subfraxinea Nyl. (1870)
- Ramalina subgeniculata Nyl. (1870)
- Ramalina subleptocarpha Rundel & Bowler (1976)
- Ramalina sublitoralis Asahina (1939)
- Ramalina subpollinaria Nyl. (1870)
- Ramalina subrotunda Kashiw., C.W.Sm. & K.H.Moon (2002) – Hawaii
- Ramalina subulata Mont. (1852)
- Ramalina subvulcania Werner (1948)
- Ramalina sulcatula Nyl. (1870)

== T ==
- Ramalina taitensis Nyl. (1870)
- Ramalina tapperi Krog & Swinscow (1974) – East Africa
- Ramalina tenaensis V.Marcano & A.Morales (2021)
- Ramalina tenella Müll.Arg. (1879)
- Ramalina tenuis Fr. & Tuck. (1858)
- Ramalina tenuissima V.Marcano & A.Morales (1994) – Venezuela
- Ramalina thrausta (Ach.) Nyl. (1870)
- Ramalina thraustoides Vain. (1924)
- Ramalina throwerae Aptroot & Sipman (2001) – Hong Kong
- Ramalina timdaliana Krog (1990)
- Ramalina tingitana Salzm. (1870)
- Ramalina tovarensis V.Marcano & A.Morales (1994) – Venezuela
- Ramalina translucida Krog & Swinscow (1974) – East Africa
- Ramalina tropica G.N.Stevens (1987) – Australia
- Ramalina tucumanensis Räsänen (1949)
- Ramalina tumescens Kashiw., K.H.Moon & J.E.Han (2023) – Japan

== U ==
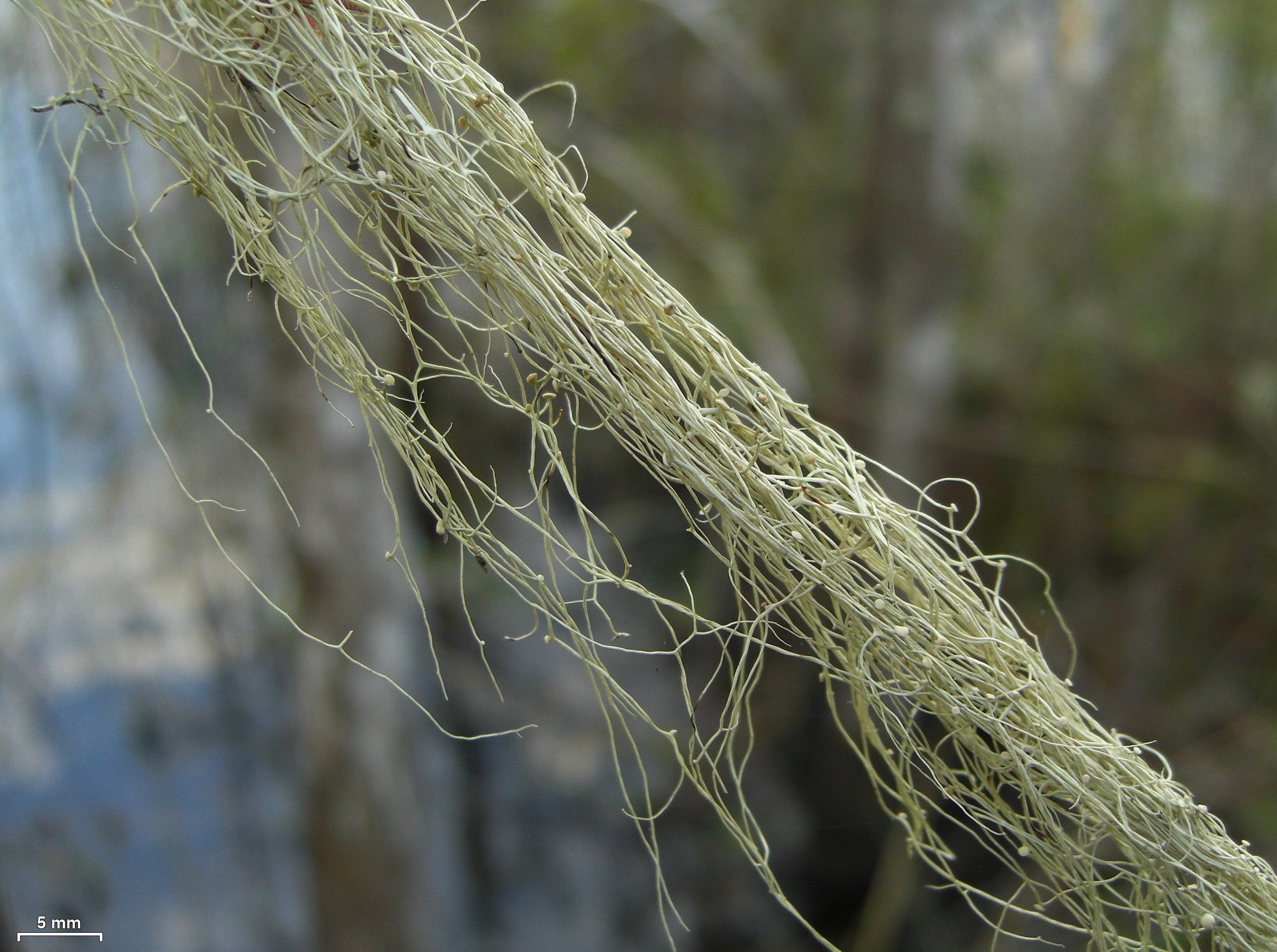
Ramalina usnea

- Ramalina umbilicata H.Magn. (1945)
- Ramalina unifolia J.W.Thomson (1990)
- Ramalina unilateralis F.Wilson (1889)
- Ramalina usnea (L.) R.Howe (1914)

== V ==
- Ramalina vareschii V.Marcano & A.Morales (1994)
- Ramalina venezuelensis V.Marcano & A.Morales (2021)
- Ramalina verrucosa Hook.f. & Taylor (1844)
- Ramalina victoriana V.Marcano & L.Castillo (2021)
- Ramalina vittata Nyl. (1870)
- Ramalina vizzavonensis Zschacke (1927)
- Ramalina vogulina Vain. (1928)
- Ramalina voukii Kušan & Zahlbr. (1933)

== W ==
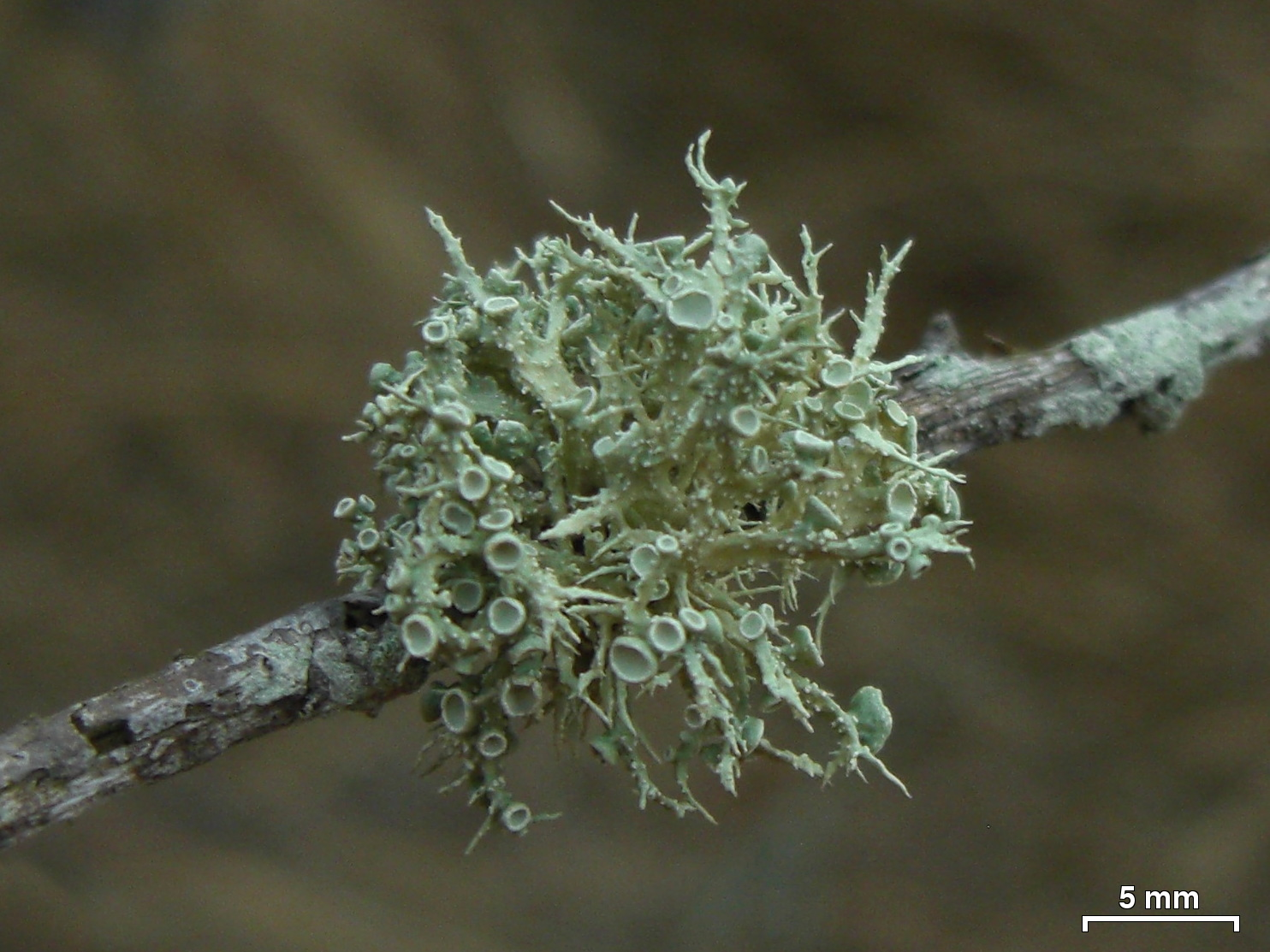
Ramalina willeyi

- Ramalina whinrayi G.N.Stevens (1986) – Australia
- Ramalina willeyi R.Howe (1914)
- Ramalina wirthii Aptroot & Schumm (2008) – Azores

== X ==
- Ramalina xalapensis V.Marcano & A.Morales (1994)

== Y ==
- Ramalina yasudae Räsänen (1940)
- Ramalina yokotae Kashiw. & K.H.Moon (2017) – Japan
- Ramalina zollingeri Szatala (1937)
