= Ramalina rigidella =

Scientific classification
- Kingdom: Fungi
- Division: Ascomycota
- Class: Lecanoromycetes
- Order: Lecanorales
- Family: Ramalinaceae
- Genus: Ramalina
- Species: R. rigidella

Binomial name
- Ramalina rigidella Aptroot (2008)

Species of lichen-forming fungus

Ramalina rigidella is a species of saxicolous (rock-dwelling), fruticose lichen in the family Ramalinaceae. It is found in the remote tropical island of Saint Helena, where it occurs on boulders and cliffs throughout the island. It was formally described as a new species in 2008 by Dutch lichenologist André Aptroot. The type specimen was collected by the author on the north slope of Dry Gut on Prosperous Bay Plain at an elevation of 280 m (920 ft); there, it was found growing on basalt. The fruticose thallus of the lichen, initially shrubby, become pendant as it ages, reaching lengths of up to 80 cm (31 in), although typically it is smaller, up to about 10 cm (4 in). Thin-layer chromatography shows that the species contains usnic acid, norstictic acid, and connorstictic acid. The photobiont partner is dispersed in irregular groups throughout the medulla. The author suggests that, based on the length of some observed specimens on exposed cliffs, some individuals might be up to 500 years old.

== See also ==
- List of Ramalina species
