= Ramalina geniculatella =

Scientific classification
- Kingdom: Fungi
- Division: Ascomycota
- Class: Lecanoromycetes
- Order: Lecanorales
- Family: Ramalinaceae
- Genus: Ramalina
- Species: R. geniculatella

Binomial name
- Ramalina geniculatella Aptroot (2008)

Species of lichen-forming fungus

Ramalina geniculatella is a species of saxicolous (rock-dwelling), fruticose lichen in the family Ramalinaceae. It is found in the remote tropical island of Saint Helena, where it grows on boulders and cliffs. It was formally described as a new species in 2008 by Dutch lichenologist André Aptroot. The type specimen was collected by the author from Prosperous Bay Plain at an elevation of 330 m (1,080 ft); there, it was found growing on basalt. The initially shrub-like, fruticose thallus of the lichen later becomes pendant, reaching lengths of up to 20 cm (8 in), although typically it is smaller, about 7 cm (2.8 in). The branches of the thallus are about 0.5–1.2 mm wide and about 0.2–0.5 mm thick; they are geniculate (sharply bent) below the apothecia. The species epithet refers to this characteristic feature. Although the branches are greenish-grey, they are covered with whitish pseudocyphellae, which gives the thallus an overall whitish appearance. Thin-layer chromatography shows that the species contains usnic acid, and sometimes boninic acid and protocetraric acids. The photobiont partner is dispersed in irregular groups throughout the medulla.

== See also ==
- List of Ramalina species
