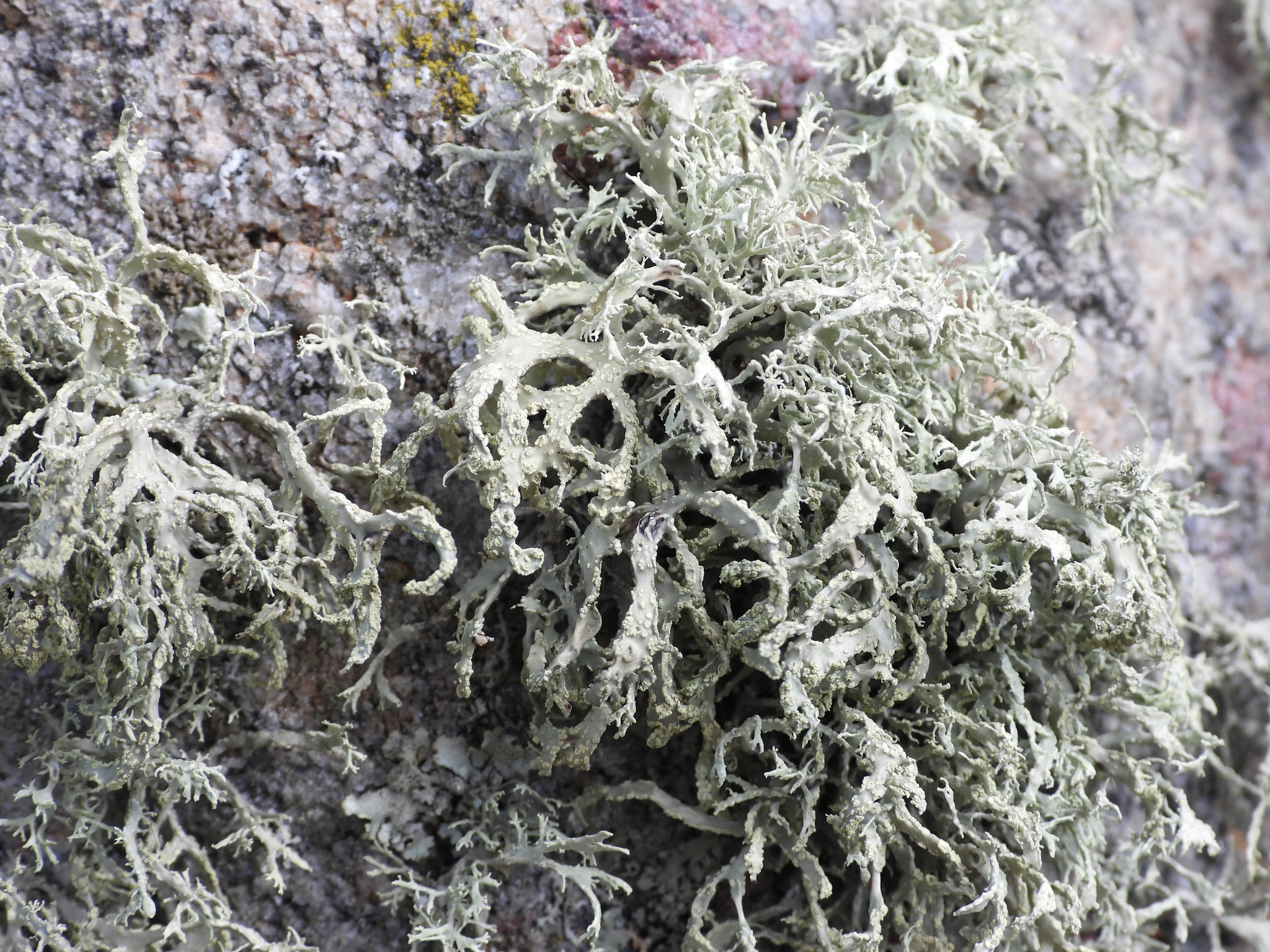

Scientific classification
- Kingdom: Fungi
- Division: Ascomycota
- Class: Lecanoromycetes
- Order: Lecanorales
- Family: Ramalinaceae
- Genus: Ramalina
- Species: R. subfarinacea

Binomial name
- Ramalina subfarinacea (Nyl. ex Cromb.) Nyl. (1872)

Synonyms
- Ramalina scopulorum var. subfarinacea Nyl. ex Cromb. (1872); Ramalina angustissima (Anzi) Vain. (1888)

= Ramalina subfarinacea =

Species of lichen-forming fungus

Ramalina subfarinacea is a species of lichen in the family Ramalinaceae. It was first described by Finnish lichenologist William Nylander in 1872 as Ramalina scopulorum var. subfarinacea. Nylander promoted it to species status in another publication that year.

Ramalina subfarinacea is known to contain both stictic acid and usnic acid.

== See also ==
- List of Ramalina species
