= Ramalina whinrayi =

Scientific classification
- Kingdom: Fungi
- Division: Ascomycota
- Class: Lecanoromycetes
- Order: Lecanorales
- Family: Ramalinaceae
- Genus: Ramalina
- Species: R. whinrayi

Binomial name
- Ramalina whinrayi G.N.Stevens (1986)

Species of lichen-forming fungus

Ramalina whinrayi is a species of fruticose lichen in the family Ramalinaceae. This Australian endemic forms rigid, tufted growths up to 10 cm tall on granitic boulders and basaltic cliffs in the harsh, wind-swept environment of Bass Strait islands and northern Tasmania. It is distinguished by its distinctive internal anatomy featuring a thick outer cortex and discontinuous cord-like tissue that creates islands of medullary tissue, a structure reminiscent of the Northern Hemisphere species R. capitata.

== Taxonomy ==
Ramalina whinrayi is a rock-dwelling (saxicolous) species described as new to science by G. Nell Stevens in 1986. The holotype was collected on Hogan Island in northern Bass Strait (on granite, 66 m above sea level) by John Whinray on 23 November 1973 (MEL 1012948); the specific name honours Whinray for his extensive Bass Strait collections. Stevens originally spelled the epithet "whinrayii", but under the International Code of Nomenclature for algae, fungi, and plants the genitive of a surname such as Whinray takes a single -i (cf. "grayi" from Gray), so the spelling is corrected to "whinrayi" without change of authorship or date.

Stevens noted that the species differs anatomically from other Australian Ramalina, with an internal structure reminiscent of the Northern Hemisphere taxon R. capitata.

== Description ==
The lichen forms rigid, tufted (caespitose) thalli up to about 10 cm tall. Branching is sparse and arises mainly from the base; branches are narrow (about 1.0–2.5 mm wide), mostly nearly cylindrical (somewhat terete to terete) and only rarely flattened, with tips that are tapered or blunt. The surface is matt. Tiny, coarse, dot-like pores in the skin (pseudocyphellae) are numerous. Attachment to the rock may be by a single holdfast or, in colonies, a more diffuse base. Powdery outgrowths for asexual reproduction (soralia) are absent. Sexual fruiting bodies (apothecia) are common, usually near the tips or along the sides, 3–10 mm across; the spores are straight, ellipsoid and relatively small (around 12 μm long and 4–5 μm wide).

The internal anatomy is distinctive: a thick outer cortex overlies a discontinuous sheath of supportive, cord-like tissue that intrudes into the medulla, creating islands of medullary tissue with clumps of algal cells. In chemical tests, the species contains divaricatic acid together with either nordivaricatic or sekikaic acid, plus 4-O-demethylsekikaic acid and usnic acid. Thalli growing on granite tend to be more cylindrical and produce many tiny, black pimply asexual structures (pycnidia), as well as abundant pseudocyphellae; granite and basalt forms share the same internal structure.

== Habitat and distribution ==
Ramalina whinrayi is an Australian endemic confined to a handful of Bass Strait islands and a single site on the Tasmanian north coast. It grows on granitic boulders at roughly 36–84 m above sea level, within a band from the Hogan Group south-east to the Kent Group and Craggy Island (about 39°12'–40°45' S). It also occurs at The Nut near Stanley, Tasmania, where it was collected from overhangs on a basaltic sea cliff at 143 m; all known localities are exposed, wind-swept sites with harsh conditions.

== See also ==
- List of Ramalina species
