= Ramalina hyrcana =

Scientific classification
- Kingdom: Fungi
- Division: Ascomycota
- Class: Lecanoromycetes
- Order: Lecanorales
- Family: Ramalinaceae
- Genus: Ramalina
- Species: R. hyrcana

Binomial name
- Ramalina hyrcana Sipman (2011)

Species of lichen-forming fungus

Ramalina hyrcana is a species of fruticose lichen in the family Ramalinaceae. Found in the Hyrcanian forest area along the Caspian coast in Iran, it was described as new to science in 2011.

== Taxonomy ==
Ramalina hyrcana was described as a new species in 2011 by Dutch lichenologist Harrie Sipman. The species name is derived from the type of forest where it is found. The type specimen was collected in Iran's Golestan province, on a Pterocarya trunk within a deciduous forest.

== Description ==
The thallus of Ramalina hyrcana forms bushy cushions 1–4 cm (0.4–1.6 in) thick and is densely branched with strap-shaped lobes. The surface of the lobes is sometimes slightly striate, and pseudocyphellae are absent. The species is characterised by the presence of tiny, fragile branchlets with hooked tips, mainly towards the lobe tips and occasionally on the soralia. The soralia are primarily marginal, round to elongate, and are turned downward, with the soredia mainly produced on the underside of more or less horizontal lobes. Apothecia and pycnidia are unknown for this species. Its secondary chemistry comprises trace amounts of usnic acid (in the cortex) and sekikaic acid with traces of related substances (in the medulla).

=== Similar species ===
Ramalina hyrcana is sympatric with R. farinacea and R. pollinaria, sharing similarities such as a deeply divided thallus with strap-like lobes and marginal soralia. However, it is distinguished from both species by the presence of sekikaic acid and down-turned soralia. While R. farinacea has lateral soralia that do not turn downward and contains protocetraric, salazinic, or norstictic acid in Iranian strains, R. pollinaria contains evernic acid and has less regularly divided thalli with wider lobes. Ramalina hyrcana shares its chemistry, thallus shape, and presence of soralia with R. nervulosa and R. peruviana but differs from both in its down-turned soralia.

== Habitat and distribution ==
Ramalina hyrcana is found exclusively in the Hyrcanian forests along the Caspian coast in Iran, between 10 metres (sea level) and approximately 400 metres (1,300 ft). It grows on tree trunks and is quite shade tolerant.

== See also ==
- List of Ramalina species
