= Ramalina inclinata =

Scientific classification
- Kingdom: Fungi
- Division: Ascomycota
- Class: Lecanoromycetes
- Order: Lecanorales
- Family: Ramalinaceae
- Genus: Ramalina
- Species: R. inclinata

Binomial name
- Ramalina inclinata Kashiw., K.H.Moon & M.-J.Lai (2006)

Species of lichen-forming fungus

Ramalina inclinata is a species of saxicolous (rock-dwelling) fruticose lichen in the family Ramalinaceae. Found in Taiwan, it was scientifically described by Hiroyuki Kashiwadani, Kwang Hee Moon, and Ming-Jou Lai in 2006.

== Description ==
Ramalina inclinata is saxicolous, meaning it grows on rocks, and can reach up to 3 cm (1.2 in) in length. It has a decumbent growth form, meaning it lies partially along the substrate with the tips ascending. The lobes are greenish-yellow, solid, cylindrical, and can grow up to 1.2 mm wide. The main branches have tapering side branches. Unlike some related species, R. inclinata lacks soralia (reproductive structures) and pseudocyphellae (small pores on the surface of the thallus). The cortex of the lobes is indistinct and 10–12 μm thick, with smooth, continuous chondroid tissue. The medulla is loose, with embedded strands of chondroid tissue. Apothecia (cup-like structures containing spore-bearing tissue) are rare and lateral, with a more or less convex disc lacking a white margin. Ascospores are short-fusiform, measuring 12–15 by 3.5–4.5 μm. Pycnidia (asexual reproductive structures) have not been observed to occur in this species.

Ramalina inclinata resembles Ramalina litoralis, a saxicolous species found on seaside rocks in eastern Asia. Both species have similar branches with ellipsoid pseudocyphellae. However, R. inclinata can be distinguished by the absence of soralia and the presence of norstictic acid together with sekikaic acid as major chemical substances. Additionally, the chondroid tissue of R. inclinata is smooth, while that of R. litoralis is distinctly cracked, and does not spread into the hyphae of the medulla.

Similar anatomical features have been reported in other species, such as Ramalina pluviariae and Ramalina scopulorum var. nematodes, both found in the Canary Islands. These species differ in having striate pseudocyphellae, a distinct cortex, and in producing protocetraric or salazinic acids.

=== Chemistry ===
Chemical analysis of Ramalina inclinata using thin-layer chromatography revealed the presence of usnic acid, sekikaic acid, 4-O-demethylsekikaic acid, and norstictic acid as major secondary metabolites.

== Habitat and distribution ==
Ramalina inclinata is known only from several locations near the type locality in Taiwan, specifically on steep conglomerate rocks near the top of Mount Dajian in Pingtung County. It grows on rocks at elevations ranging from 200 to 300 m (660 to 980 ft).

== See also ==
- List of Ramalina species
