= Ramalina stoffersii =

Scientific classification
- Kingdom: Fungi
- Division: Ascomycota
- Class: Lecanoromycetes
- Order: Lecanorales
- Family: Ramalinaceae
- Genus: Ramalina
- Species: R. stoffersii

Binomial name
- Ramalina stoffersii Sipman (2011)

Species of lichen-forming fungus

Ramalina stoffersii is a species of lichen in the family Ramalinaceae. It was formally described in 2011 by the lichenologist Harrie Sipman from material collected on the volcanic island of Saba in the Lesser Antilles and was named in honor of Dutch botanist A.L. Stoffers. The lichen forms pale yellow-green, semi-pendulous cushions with narrow, ribbon-like branches that fork repeatedly in a Y-shaped pattern and produce powdery reproductive patches along the margins. It is known from four Caribbean islands—Saba, Sint Eustatius, Sint Maarten, and Puerto Rico—where it grows primarily on sun-exposed rocks and stone walls in coastal areas below 500 meters elevation.

== Taxonomy ==
Ramalina stoffersii was formally described in 2011 by lichenologist Harrie Sipman from material collected on the volcanic island of Saba in the Lesser Antilles. The new species had long been confused with the look-alike R. dendroides—which often grows at the same sites—because both have intricately branched, pendulous cushions. Chemical and morphological study showed, however, that the two differ in both their secondary metabolites and their mode of vegetative reproduction. R. stoffersii produces divaricatic acid but lacks salazinic acid, the opposite pattern seen in R. dendroides. It also generates true soralia (powdery reproductive patches) instead of the corticate granules found on the short lateral branchlets of R. dendroides. The species epithet honors the Dutch botanist A.L. Stoffers, who encouraged early work on Antillean lichens.

== Description ==
The lichen forms pale yellow-green, semi-pendulous cushions 3–10 cm tall and up to about 20 cm across. The branching "strands" (technically called lobes) are narrow and ribbon-like—roughly 1–2 mm wide and 0.3 mm thick—and fork regularly in a Y-shaped (dichotomous) pattern as many as ten times along their length. Tiny longitudinal cracks called pseudocyphellae run mostly along the lobe edges; these slit-like pores, often more than 1 cm long, provide gas exchange and give the lobe a squarish cross-section. Near the tips, the lobes may carry minute, hook-shaped offshoots about 0.1 mm wide.

Asexual reproduction takes place in farinose (powdery) soralia that form along the lobe margins. Each soralium is circular to slightly elongated, 0.2–0.5 mm across, and releases microscopic soredia (roughly 50 μm in diameter) that contain both fungal and algal partners and can establish new thalli. No sexual fruiting bodies (apothecia) or pycnidia have been observed. Spot tests and thin-layer chromatography show usnic acid (responsible for the pale yellowish color) together with divaricatic acid; salazinic acid is absent, providing a quick chemical marker that separates the species from several close relatives.

== Habitat and distribution ==
Ramalina stoffersii is known from four islands in the northeastern Caribbean—Saba, Sint Eustatius, Sint Maarten, and Puerto Rico—where it inhabits maritime climates below about 500 m elevation. Most collections come from sun-exposed andesite boulders or stone walls bordering cultivated fields and footpaths; one specimen grew on the bark of a Mammea americana tree, suggesting that the species may be more commonly epiphytic in undisturbed coastal scrub.

== See also ==
- List of Ramalina species
