= Ramalina furcellangulida =

Scientific classification
- Kingdom: Fungi
- Division: Ascomycota
- Class: Lecanoromycetes
- Order: Lecanorales
- Family: Ramalinaceae
- Genus: Ramalina
- Species: R. furcellangulida

Binomial name
- Ramalina furcellangulida Aptroot (2007)

Species of lichen-forming fungus

Ramalina furcellangulida is a species of fruticose lichen in the family Ramalinaceae, described in 2007 from the Galápagos Islands. It forms small, greenish-grey tufts with angular, often hook-tipped branches that bear fine white lines (pseudocyphellae) and frequent cup-shaped fruiting discs. It is found mainly on bark in the coastal and arid zones of the archipelago and is considered endemic to the region.

== Taxonomy ==
Ramalina furcellangulida was introduced as a new species by André Aptroot in a 2007 revision of the Galápagos Ramalina funga. The holotype specimen was collected on the east slope of Volcán Alcedo, Isabela Island, at about 250 m elevation, from the bark of Bursera graveolens.

The species is distinguished by narrow, angular branches that often curl at the tips, abundant linear white breaks in the surface (pseudocyphellae), and branches that tend to kink at the fruiting discs (geniculate apothecia); the medulla gives a strong potassium hydroxide reaction (K+ yellow → red). It contrasts with the similar R. montagnei, which has pointed, non-hooked tips and a different K reaction pattern.

== Description ==
The thallus (lichen body) is small, usually 1–3 cm across (to about 5 cm), compactly branched and without a single, obvious holdfast. Branches start upright and may hang with age; in cross-section they are irregularly angular rather than flattened, and they are often bent in the lengthwise direction with tips that curve like a shepherd's crook. The surface commonly bears rounded warts that abrade into parallel, linear pseudocyphellae—tiny pale slits where the inner tissue shows through. Powdery reproductive spots (soralia) are absent. Fruiting bodies (apothecia) are common, 1–4 mm wide, cup-shaped and formed on the branch surfaces; the supporting branch is often sharply bent at each apothecium (geniculate). Spores are narrowly oblong and usually curved, about 16–20 × 3–4 μm. Small flask-like asexual structures (pycnidia) occur mainly along the margins; their conidia are rod-shaped, about 4–5 × 0.5–0.7 μm.

Standard spot tests show the inner layer (medulla) reacts K+ yellow swiftly turning red and is UV positive or negative, consistent with salazinic, sekikaic and/or divaricatic acids; the outer layer (cortex) contains usnic acid and often atranorin, accounting for the greenish- to pale-grey colour.

== Habitat and distribution ==
The species occurs mostly on bark (corticolous), only rarely on rock (saxicolous), and is frequent in the coastal and arid zones of the Galápagos. Records span several islands, including Isabela (Volcán Alcedo), Pinta, Pinzón, Plaza Sur, San Cristóbal, Santa Cruz and Santiago, from near sea level to around 250 m. Substrates documented include Bursera graveolens and other dry-zone shrubs and trees, and occasional coastal basalt. Ramalina furcellangulida is one of 16 Ramalina species reported to occur in the Galápagos. Its IUCN Red List status is listed as data deficient.

== See also ==
- List of Ramalina species
