= Ramalina caespitella =

Scientific classification
- Kingdom: Fungi
- Division: Ascomycota
- Class: Lecanoromycetes
- Order: Lecanorales
- Family: Ramalinaceae
- Genus: Ramalina
- Species: R. caespitella

Binomial name
- Ramalina caespitella G.N.Stevens (1986)

Species of lichen-forming fungus

Ramalina caespitella is a species of rock-dwelling, fruticose lichen in the family Ramalinaceae. Described in 1986 from specimens collected on Long Island in Bass Strait, this lichen is found only in Australia, where it grows on exposed rocky cliff faces on islands in Bass Strait and along the Tasmanian coast. It forms distinctive rigid, tufted cushions that can grow up to 10 centimetres tall. The species reproduces mainly through powdery propagules, and contains characteristic lichen products including sekikaic acid.

== Taxonomy ==
Ramalina caespitella is a maritime species described as new to science by Gweneth Nell Stevens in 1986. The holotype was collected by J. S. Whinray on Long Island (Bass Strait), on granite at 14 m elevation, on 19 November 1969 (MEL 1019904).

== Description ==
The thallus forms rigid, tufted cushions (caespitose) that are typically small but may reach about 10 cm tall. Branching is somewhat dichotomous to irregular: narrow plants are densely branched, whereas broader plants branch more sparingly. Branches are solid and range from flat to almost cylindrical (subterete to terete); most are 0.1–2.0 mm wide, with occasional thicker branches up to around 6 mm. Narrow branches often show small nodules; tips are broad and blunt. The surface is shiny, the holdfast may be a discrete pad or more diffuse. Powdery asexual propagules (soralia) are well developed on the margins and surfaces, where they may crack open; apothecia (disc-like sexual fruiting bodies) are rare, small, and usually occur near the branch tips, and no spores were observed. The lichen products are characteristic: sekikaic acid is present, together with traces of 4'-O-demethylsekikaic acid, several terpenes, and usnic acid.

Two morphs occur and intergrade, so they were not treated as separate taxa: one has narrow, almost cylindrical nodular branches with mainly apical and marginal soralia; the other has very thick, flat to somewhat terete branches bearing numerous soralia on both upper and lower surfaces. Internally the anatomy corresponds to the "R. farinacea-type" structure as defined by Krog and Østhagen in 1980.

== Habitat and distribution ==
Ramalina caespitella is a temperate maritime Australian endemic. It occurs on several islands in Bass Strait and at scattered sites on the Tasmanian coast, typically on siliceous rocks, granite on the islands and quartzite or dolerite in Tasmania, where it usually occupies exposed cliff faces. Ramalina caespitella is one of five Ramalina species that have been reported from Tasmania.

== See also ==
- List of Ramalina species
