= Ramalina litorea =

Scientific classification
- Kingdom: Fungi
- Division: Ascomycota
- Class: Lecanoromycetes
- Order: Lecanorales
- Family: Ramalinaceae
- Genus: Ramalina
- Species: R. litorea

Binomial name
- Ramalina litorea G.N.Stevens (1986)

Species of lichen-forming fungus

Ramalina litorea is a species of fruticose lichen in the family Ramalinaceae. This small, maritime lichen forms minute, rigid tufts on wave-exposed coastal cliffs and is distinguished from similar species by its unique chemistry, containing evernic acid rather than the divaricatic acid found in related species. It has a disjunct distribution, being known from tropical Queensland in Australia and also from islands in the Indian Ocean including Mauritius and Rodrigues.

== Taxonomy ==
Ramalina litorea is a small, rock-dwelling (saxicolous) sea-cliff species described by G. Nell Stevens in 1986 as part of a study of maritime Ramalina in Australia. It was segregated chiefly on chemistry and geography from the morphologically similar Hawaiian taxon R. microspora. Whereas R. microspora contains divaricatic acid, R. litorea has evernic acid as its major secondary metabolite; the two also differ slightly in branching details and in the form of their fruiting bodies (apothecia). Specimens from Mauritius and Rodrigues that had been labelled R. microspora were found to contain evernic acid and match the Australian material, and are therefore better referred to R. litorea; this raised the possibility that R. microspora may represent chemically distinct races across the Pacific and Indian Oceans.

== Description ==
The thallus of R. litorea forms minute, rigid tufts (caespitose), typically measuring 0.5–2.0 cm tall. Branching is subdichotomous to irregular, and very small side-branches ("spinules") arise laterally from the main axes. Branches are narrow (about 0.2–1.0 mm wide), mostly cylindrical to slightly rounded in cross-section (subterete to terete), with slender, often pointed and rather brittle tips. The surface is smooth and varies from shiny to matt; tiny cortex pores (pseudocyphellae) and powdery reproductive patches (soralia) are absent. Attachment to the rock is by a diffuse holdfast. Disc-like fruiting bodies (apothecia) are common, usually placed along the margins or sides just below the tips; they are small (about 1.0–2.0 mm across) with a thin to thick margin. Ascospores are small, oval to ellipsoid and straight, roughly 8–12 × 4–4.5 micrometres (μm), typically with thick walls.

The lichen chemistry is distinctive: evernic acid is the major lichen product, with traces of lecanoric and sekikaic acids, and usnic acid also present. This profile separates R. litorea from look-alikes such as R. microspora (divaricatic acid) despite their broadly similar appearance.

== Habitat and distribution ==
Ramalina litorea is maritime and saxicolous, growing on wave-exposed coastal cliffs. In Australia it is known from tropical Queensland between roughly 14°40'S and 24°20'S. Collections (few in number, partly because the thalli are so small) come from sea-cliff faces usually 10–20 m above the shore; an outlying record on Lizard Island reaches about 360 m elevation. Occurrences of the lichen have been recorded from Lizard Island south to the Capricorn Coast. R. litorea was included in the first checklist of lichens of Mauritius in 2020.

The species is not fussy about rock chemistry: it has been recorded on granite, siltstone, slates, rhyolitic breccia and tuff. The author inferred that the mechanical character of the cliff (its structure and exposure) matters more than the mineral composition. Colonies of R. litorea are scattered and small across the range.

== See also ==
- List of Ramalina species
