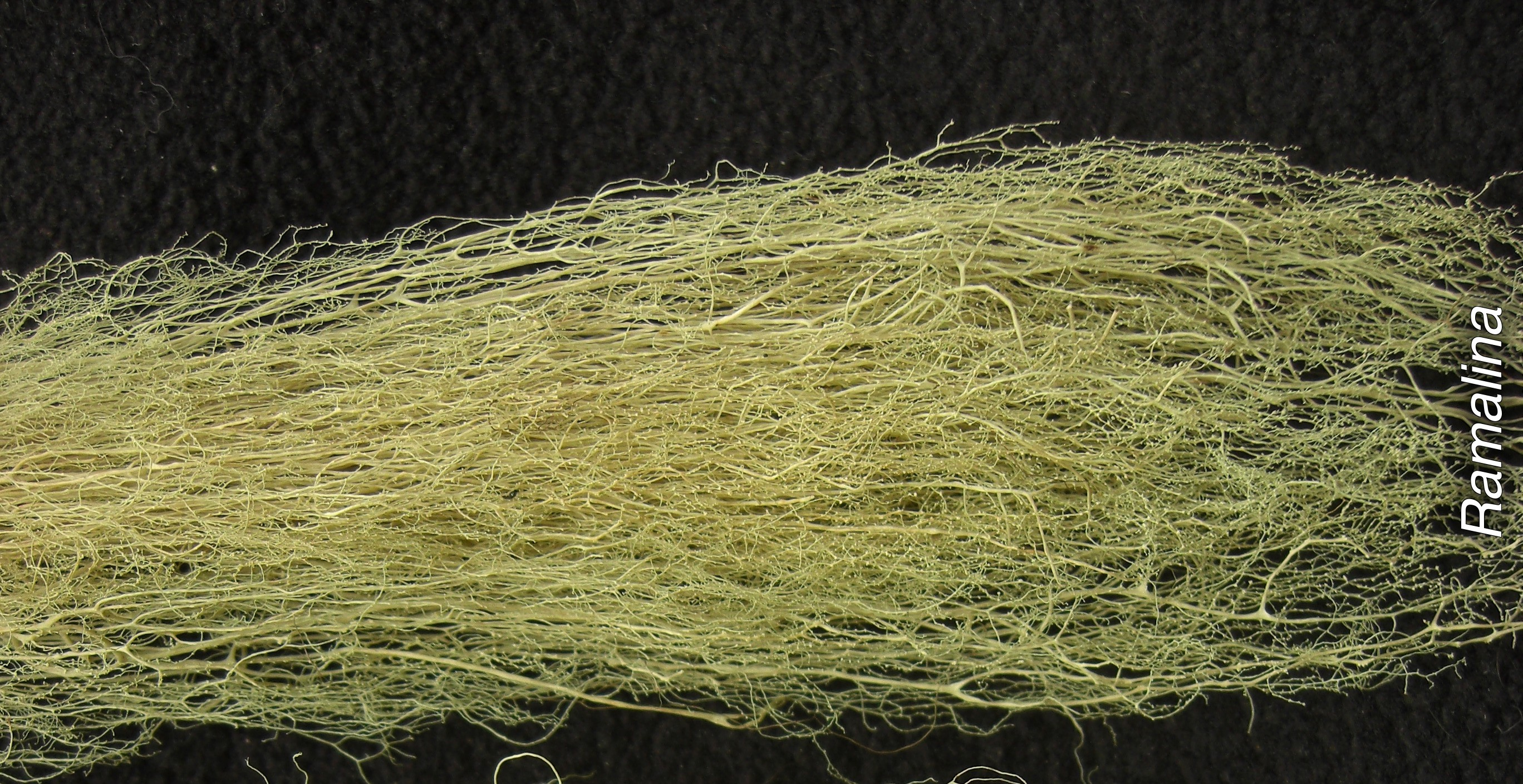

Conservation status
- Secure (NatureServe)

Scientific classification
- Kingdom: Fungi
- Division: Ascomycota
- Class: Lecanoromycetes
- Order: Lecanorales
- Family: Ramalinaceae
- Genus: Ramalina
- Species: R. thrausta

Binomial name
- Ramalina thrausta (Ach.) Nyl. (1870)

Synonyms
- Alectoria thrausta Ach. (1810)

= Ramalina thrausta =

Species of lichen-forming fungus

Ramalina thrausta is a species of fruticose lichen belonging to the family Ramalinaceae. It is found in Europe and Northern America.

== See also ==
- List of Ramalina species
