= Ramalina sanctae-helenae =

Scientific classification
- Kingdom: Fungi
- Division: Ascomycota
- Class: Lecanoromycetes
- Order: Lecanorales
- Family: Ramalinaceae
- Genus: Ramalina
- Species: R. sanctae-helenae

Binomial name
- Ramalina sanctae-helenae Aptroot (2008)

Species of lichen-forming fungus

Ramalina sanctae-helenae is a species of saxicolous (rock-dwelling), fruticose lichen in the family Ramalinaceae. It is found in the remote tropical island of Saint Helena, where it grows in semi-desert areas and on cliffs throughout the island. It was formally described as a new species in 2008 by Dutch lichenologist André Aptroot. The type specimen was collected by the author on the north slope of Prosperous Bay Plain at an elevation of 280 m (920 ft); there, it was found growing on basalt. The fruticose thallus of the lichen, initially shrubby, becomes pendant with age, reaching lengths of up to 40 cm (15.7 in), although typically it is smaller, up to about 7 cm (2.8 in). Thin-layer chromatography shows that the species contains usnic acid, and, depending on the strain, sometimes boninic acid, protocetraric acid, and divaricatic acid. The species epithet refers to the type locality. According to the author, the presence of various chemical strains of the lichen suggest that it is undergoing speciation.

== See also ==
- List of Ramalina species
