= Ramalina sarahae =

Scientific classification
- Kingdom: Fungi
- Division: Ascomycota
- Class: Lecanoromycetes
- Order: Lecanorales
- Family: Ramalinaceae
- Genus: Ramalina
- Species: R. sarahae

Binomial name
- Ramalina sarahae K.Knudsen, Lendemer & Kocourk. (2018)

Species of lichen-forming fungus

Ramalina sarahae is a species of fruticose lichen in the family Ramalinaceae. This species is endemic to the Channel Islands of California, USA.

== Taxonomy ==
Ramalina sarahae was first described in 2018 by the lichenologists Kerry Knudsen, James Lendemer, and Jana Kocourková. The species epithet honors Sarah Chaney, a retired ecologist and long-time Channel Islands National Park employee who guided various lichenological studies. The species shares similarities with Ramalina lacera in lacking chondroid strands in the cortex, but differs by having only linear pseudocyphellae and lacking soralia, and a growth form with thinner branches.

== Description ==
The thallus of Ramalina sarahae is caespitose, usually rounded, densely branched, and arises from a single holdfast. It reaches up to 4.5 cm (1.8 in) in height and 6 cm (2.4 in) in width. The branches are yellowish-green, smooth to irregularly ridged, especially near the thallus base, and are more or less dichotomously or irregularly branching. Pseudocyphellae are commonly found on the margins and are linear. The branches are solid and bifacial with a cortex thickness of 30–40 μm without chondroid strands. The algal layer is discontinuous, and the medulla consists of dirty white, thin-walled hyphae.

== Habitat and distribution ==
Ramalina sarahae is known only from two locations: San Miguel Island and San Nicolas Island, southern California, where it grows on the caudices (the thickened, woody, and persistent base) of Leptosyne gigantea. Its specific habitat requirements and limited distribution indicate that it is narrowly endemic.

== See also ==
- List of Ramalina species
