= Commemoration of Charles Darwin =

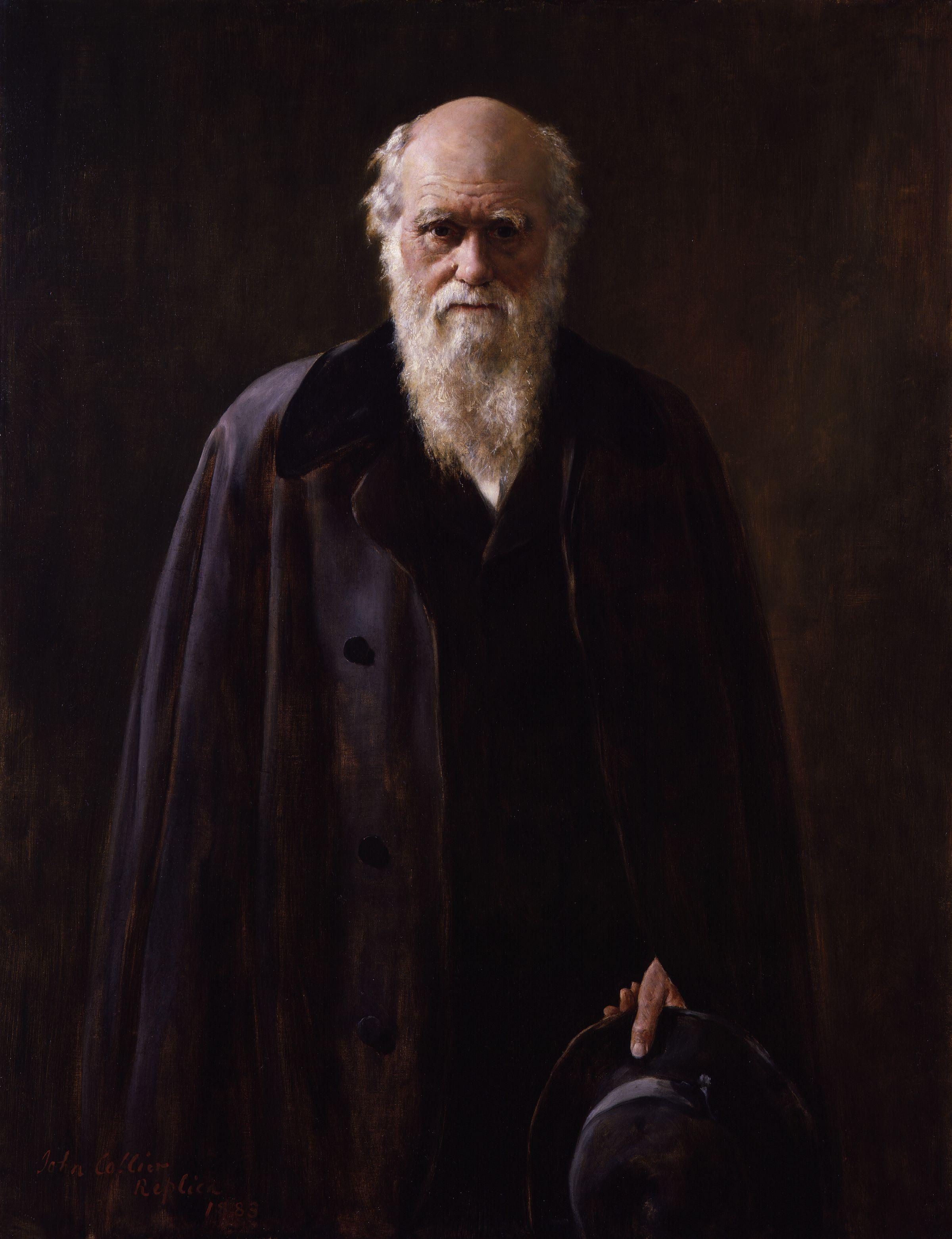
In 1881 Darwin was an eminent figure, still working on his contributions to evolutionary thought that had had an enormous effect on many fields of science.

Commemoration of Charles Darwin began with geographical features named after Darwin while he was still on the Beagle survey voyage, continued after his return with the naming of species he had collected, and extended further with his increasing fame. Many geographical features, species and institutions bear his name. Interest in his work has led to scholarship and publications, nicknamed the Darwin Industry, and his life is remembered in fiction, film and TV productions as well as in numerous biographies. Darwin Day has become an annual event, and in 2009 there were worldwide celebrations to mark the bicentenary of Darwin's birth and the 150th anniversary of the publication of On the Origin of Species.

== Geographical features ==
During Darwin's lifetime, many geographical features were given his name. An expanse of water adjoining the Beagle Channel was named Darwin Sound by HMS Beagle captain Robert FitzRoy after Darwin's prompt action, along with two or three of the men, saved them from being marooned on a nearby shore when a collapsing glacier caused a large wave that would have swept away their boats, and the nearby Mount Darwin in the Andes was named in celebration of Darwin's 25th birthday. Another Darwin Sound in British Columbia's Queen Charlotte Islands, between Moresby Island and Lyell Island, was named in 1878 by Canada's then-chief geographer George M. Dawson for Darwin. When the Beagle was surveying Australia in 1839, Darwin's friend John Lort Stokes sighted a natural harbour which the ship's captain Wickham named Port Darwin. The settlement of Palmerston founded there in 1869 was officially renamed Darwin in 1911. It became the capital city of Australia's Northern Territory.

== Scientific names ==
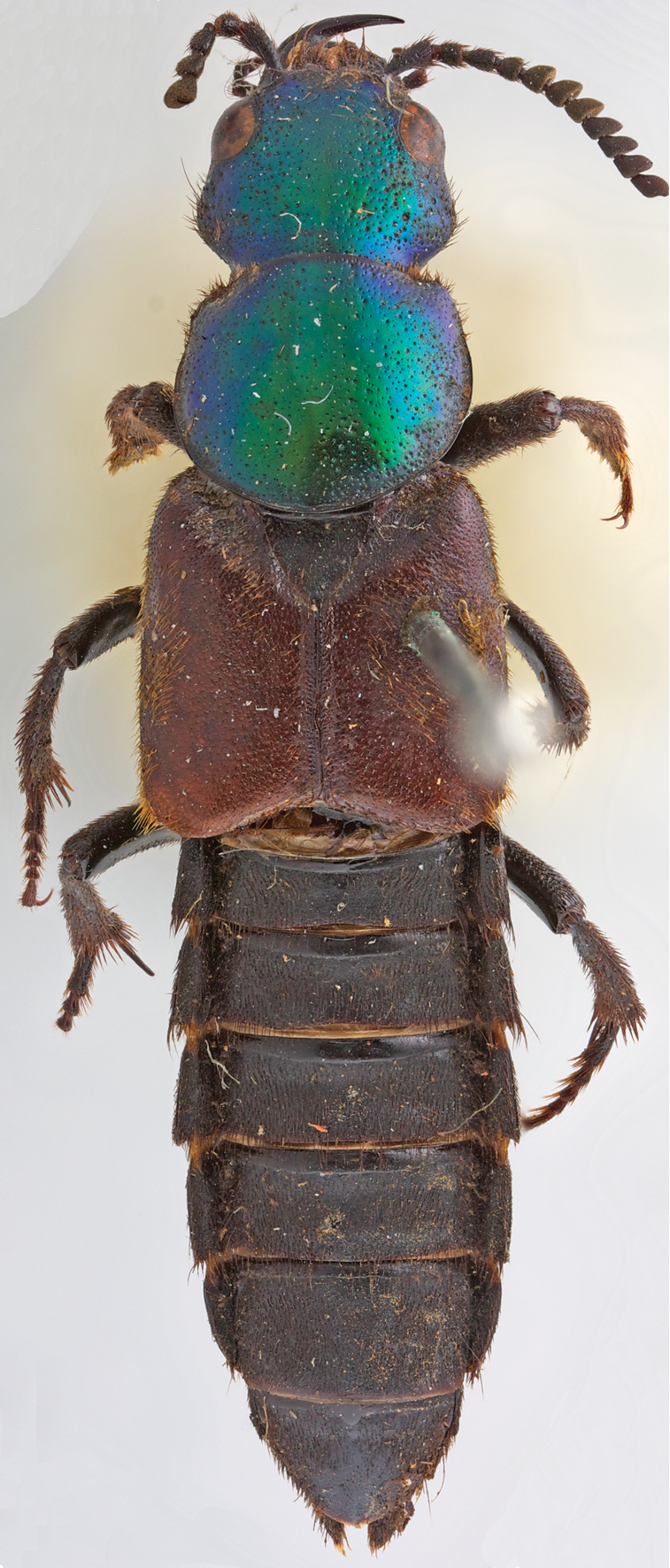
The holotype of Darwinilus sedarisi, published on Darwin's 205th birthday

More than 300 species, nine genera, and some higher taxa have been named after Darwin. In 1837, the ornithologist John Gould named a specimen Darwin had collected in Patagonia Rhea darwinii, priority was given to d'Orbigny's name for it, Rhea pennata, but it still has the common name of Darwin's rhea. Similarly, Darwin's frog, Rhinoderma darwinii, was so named because Darwin discovered the species in Chile, and the family Rhinodermatidae are commonly known as Darwin's frogs.

In 2009, a remarkably complete fossil primate from 47 million years ago was announced as a significant transitional fossil, and named Darwinius to celebrate Darwin's bicentenary. Puijila darwini, a primitive pinniped, was discovered in 2009.

Although related to American Emberizidae or tanagers rather than finches, the group of species related to those Darwin found in the Galápagos Islands became popularly known as "Darwin's finches" following publication of David Lack's book of that name in 1947, fostering inaccurate legends about their significance to his work.

Genera include:

- Darwinilus, a genus of staphylinid beetles
- Darwiniothamnus, a genus of flowering plant
- Darwinius, a genus of Eocene primates
- Darwinopterus, a genus of long-tailed pterosaurs from China
- Darwinula, an ostracod genus in the eponymous suborder Darwinulocopina, superfamily Darwinuloidea, family Darwinulidae.

Species Over 300 species are named darwinii, darwini, or charlesdarwini. Examples include:

- Rhinoderma darwinii, also called the Southern Darwin's frog, discovered by Darwin during the Second voyage of HMS Beagle
- Caerostris darwini, Darwin's bark spider, an orb-weaver spider discovered in Madagascar
- Demandasaurus darwini, a rebbachisaurid sauropod dinosaur from Spain.
- Minervarya charlesdarwini, an endangered frog of Southeast Asia
- Mastotermes darwiniensis, the most primitive extant termite species, native to Northern Australia

== Institutions ==
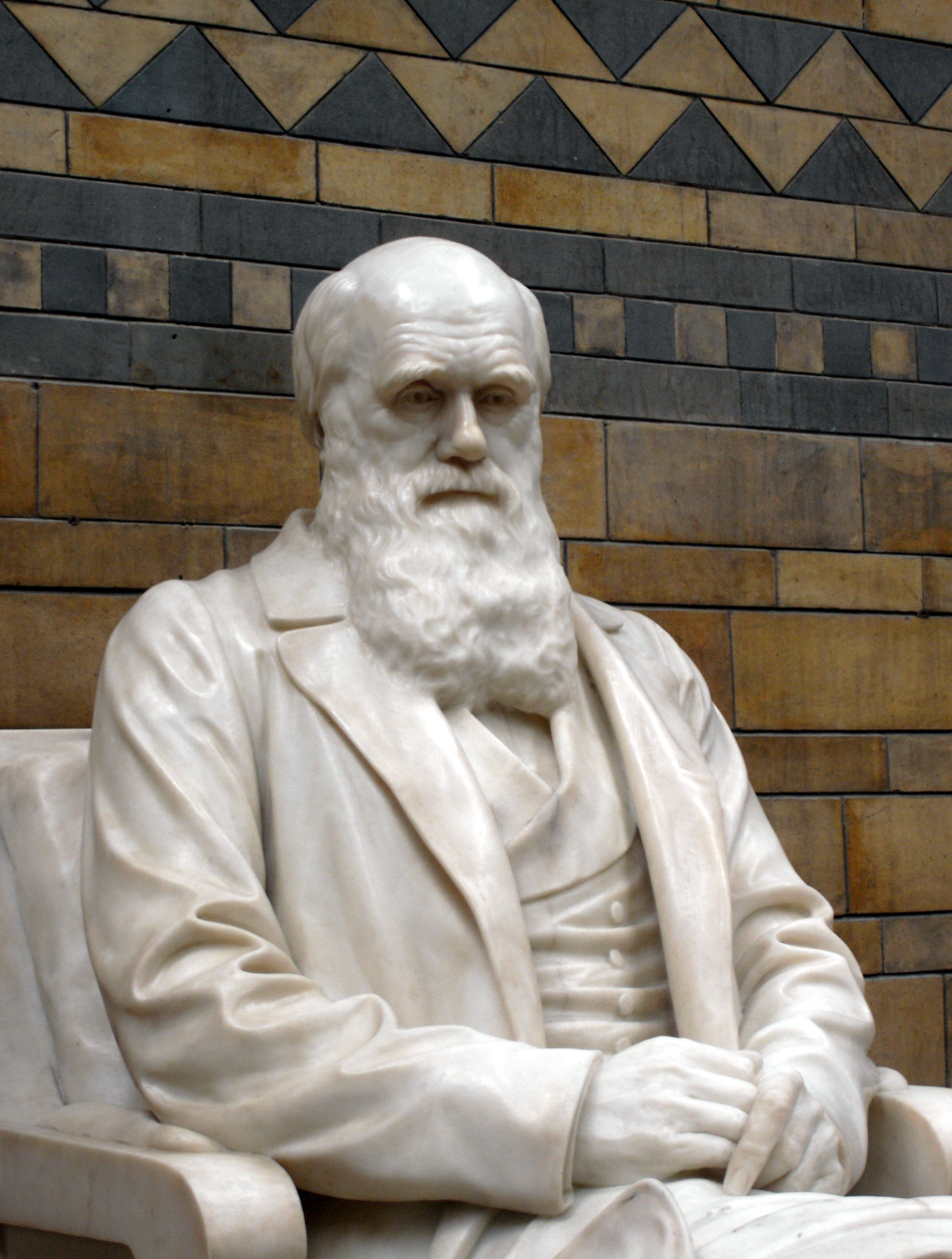
Statue of Charles Darwin at the Natural History Museum in London

Darwin in Australia features Charles Darwin University and Charles Darwin National Park. However, Darwin College, Cambridge, founded in 1964, was named in honour of the Darwin family, in part because they owned some of the site.

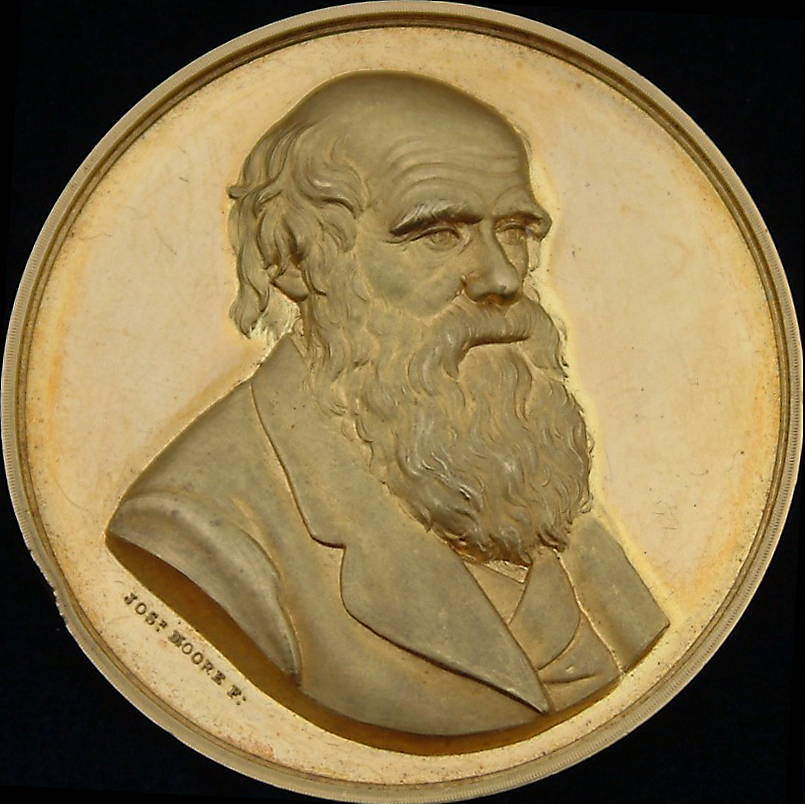
Gold Darwin Prize medal of the Midland Union of Natural History Societies, awarded to James Eustace Bagnall in 1888

In 1880, Darwin consented to a request from the Midland Union of Natural History Societies to name their annual prize and medal in his honour. The medal, by Joseph Moore, has an engraving of a bust of Darwin, on its obverse. The wax model for the medal, and the unissued 1886 medal, which was sent to Darwin's family at that time, are now at Darwin's former home, Down House, today a museum in his honour. The Linnean Society of London has commemorated Darwin's achievements by the award of the Darwin-Wallace Medal since 1908.

In the Galápagos Islands, the Charles Darwin Foundation based at the Charles Darwin Research Station does research and conservation. To mark 2009 they are helping to reintroduce to Floreana Island (Charles Island) the specific mockingbird which first alerted Darwin to species being unique to islands. It was eradicated from the main island by European species, mainly rats and goats, but survived on two small islands nearby.

Darwin came fourth in the Great Britons poll sponsored by the BBC and voted for by the public. In 2000 Darwin's image appeared on the Bank of England ten pound note, replacing Charles Dickens. His impressive, luxuriant beard (which was reportedly difficult to forge) was said to be a contributory factor to the bank's choice. The design also featured a hummingbird and HMS Beagle. He has been featured on postage stamps around the world.

=== Darwin day, and 2009 commemorations ===
Darwin Day has become an annual celebration, and in 2009 the bicentenary of Darwin's birth and the 150th anniversary of the publication of On the Origin of Species were celebrated by events and publications around the world. The Darwin exhibition, after opening at the American Museum of Natural History in New York City in 2005, was shown at the Museum of Science, Boston, the Field Museum in Chicago, the Royal Ontario Museum in Toronto, then from 14 November 2008 to 19 April 2009 in the Natural History Museum, London, as part of the Darwin200 programme of events across the United Kingdom. It also appears at the Palazzo delle Esposizioni in Rome from 12 February to 3 May 2009. The University of Cambridge featured a festival in July 2009. His birthplace, Shrewsbury, celebrated with "Darwin's Shrewsbury 2009 Festival" events during the year. An abstract sculpture, The Quantum Leap, was erected for the celebrations, and unveiled on 8 October 2009 by Randal Keynes, a great-great-grandson of Darwin. A 'geological garden' was created on its site to mark the interest which Darwin had in the field during his childhood. Darwin was commemorated by the Royal Mail in a series of postage stamps.

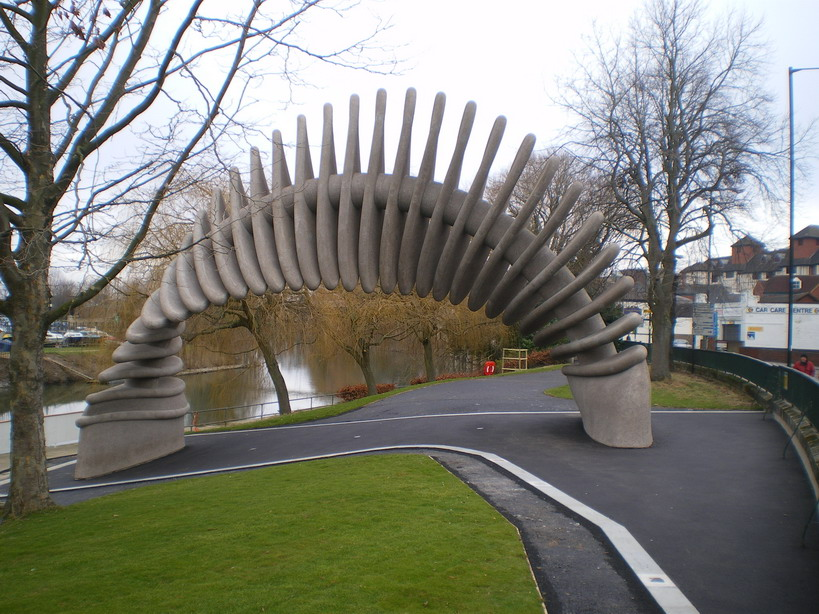
The Quantum Leap, an abstract sculpture erected in 2009 in Darwin's birthplace, Shrewsbury, for the bi-centennial of his birth

In the United Kingdom a special commemorative issue of the two pound coin shows a portrait of Darwin facing a chimpanzee surrounded by the inscription 1809 DARWIN 2009, with the edge inscription ON THE ORIGIN OF SPECIES 1859. Collector versions of the coin have been released at a premium, and during the year the coins will be available from banks and post offices at face value. To celebrate Darwin's life and achievements, the BBC has commissioned numerous television and radio programmes known collectively as the BBC Darwin Season.

In September 2008, the Church of England issued an article saying that the 200th anniversary of his birth was a fitting time to apologise to Darwin "for misunderstanding you and, by getting our first reaction wrong, encouraging others to misunderstand you still".

Since 2004, Universidad Francisco Marroquín (UFM) in Guatemala, has celebrated Darwin Day with a series of conferences that includes international speakers.

On 22 January 2013, a resolution was introduced to the United States Congress designating 12 February 2013 (Charles Darwin's 204th birthday) as "Darwin Day" to recognise "the importance of sciences in the betterment of humanity".

Darwin's alma mater, Christ's College, commemorated the bicentenary with the unveiling of a life-sized bronze statue of the young Darwin (aged 22). The statue was created by Anthony Smith and unveiled by Prince Philip on 12 February 2009. It now forms the centrepiece of the college's Darwin Garden.

== Media ==
Numerous biographies of Darwin have been written, and the 1980 biographical novel The Origin by Irving Stone gives a closely researched fictional account of Darwin's life from the age of 22 onward.

The Low Anthem's 2008 studio album Oh My God, Charlie Darwin is named after Darwin, whose theories influenced the lyrics and themes.

He was portrayed by Chris Larkin in the first episode of the PBS documentary series Evolution.

A biopic, Creation, was released in 2009, joining a short list of film dramas about Darwin, including The Darwin Adventure, released in 1972.

Beagle: In Darwin's wake was a Dutch-Flemish television series from 2009 and 2010 initiated by the VPRO in collaboration with Teleac and Canvas to commemorate the 150th anniversary of On the Origin of Species. The series is centered on an eight-month voyage around the world (commenced on September 1, 2009) on board of the clipper Stad Amsterdam which follows the route of the five-year-long voyage of Charles Darwin aboard HMS Beagle from 1831 and 1836.

Darwin is featured as an essential character in the 2004 comedy novel The Pirates! In an Adventure with Scientists. He also appears in the 2012 film of the same name.

== Online ==
- Darwin is one of the main characters of the animated web series Super Science Friends.
- He appears in a musical confrontation with the cartoon character Ash Ketchum in the internet series Epic Rap Battles of History.

== See also ==
- List of things named after Charles Darwin
