= Ramalina fragilis =

Conservation status
- Vulnerable (IUCN 3.1)

Scientific classification
- Kingdom: Fungi
- Division: Ascomycota
- Class: Lecanoromycetes
- Order: Lecanorales
- Family: Ramalinaceae
- Genus: Ramalina
- Species: R. fragilis

Binomial name
- Ramalina fragilis Aptroot & Bungartz (2007)

Species of lichen-forming fungus

Ramalina fragilis is a small, rock-dwelling fruticose lichen in the family Ramalinaceae, described in 2007 from the Galápagos Islands. It forms fragile, pale grey cushions with very thin, round branches and conspicuous whitish powdery tips. It is endemic to the archipelago. It is the rarest of the four Ramalina species thought to be endemic to the Galápagos, and is assessed as vulnerable species by the IUCN.

== Taxonomy ==
Ramalina fragilis was described as new to science in 2007 by André Aptroot and Frank Bungartz in a revision of Galápagos Ramalina published in The Lichenologist. The holotype was collected on a basalt lava cliff near Cerro Colorado on San Cristóbal Island at about 130 m elevation. The same study recognised fifteen Ramalina species on the islands, four of them newly described and thought to be Galápagos endemics: R. darwiniana, R. fragilis, R. furcellangulida, and R. polyforma.

Ramalina fragilis is separated from other sorediate species by its very small, coral-like thallus, its entirely round (terete) branches, matt, uneven surface, and its pale grey to lemon-tinged colour; it often resembles a diminutive Roccella. The species is saxicolous (rock-dwelling) and characteristic of coastal to lower transition zones.

== Description ==
The thallus (the lichen body) is dull and shrubby, typically up to about 3 cm across, upright or irregularly spreading, and distinctly fragile with very few branches. Branches are terete (round in cross-section), usually much thinner than 1 mm, and pale grey; the overall look can mimic a tiny Roccella. Soralia—powdery reproductive patches where minute grains of lichen tissue (soredia) are produced—are discrete, whitish and button-like (capitate), to about 1 mm across, and occur at branch tips. Apothecia (disc-like spore-bearing structures) and pycnidia were not observed in the available material.

Chemically, the cortex contains usnic acid and often atranorin, which accounts for the pale greyish to slightly yellow-tinged colour. The internal tissue (medulla) may have no detectable lichen substances (spot test K negative) or may give a faint pink K reaction (indicating sekikaic acid); in either case the ultraviolet reaction is negative.

== Habitat and distribution ==
Ramalina fragilis grows on volcanic rock, especially basalt, in the coastal and arid zones and up into the lower transition zone of the Galápagos. It has been documented from San Cristóbal and Pinzón, including shaded overhangs and crater rims (roughly 130–250 m elevation), as well as more exposed lava faces; the species' minute size and brittle, few-branched tufts mean it can be overlooked among other saxicolous lichens. It is consistently saxicolous and associated with relatively dry sites influenced by sea mist and trade winds. R. fragilis is one of 16 Ramalina species reported to occur in the Galápagos.

Beyond San Cristóbal and Pinzón, it is recorded from Española, Floreana, Santa Fé, and Isabela, with around twenty known localities overall, all on basaltic rock. Occurrences span three vegetation zones: coastal (sites in immediate proximity to the sea), dry (generally near the coast but not right at the shoreline), and the lower transition zone further inland. Substrates range from sheltered ledges to exposed cliff and boulder faces.

Several records fall within local lichen diversity "hot spots", including a refugial site near the trail to Post Office Bay on Floreana. In contrast to most Galápagos Ramalina, which are abundant epiphytes that drape shrubs and trees and give them a greenish-yellow cast from usnic acid pigmentation, R. fragilis is a pale, brittle saxicolous species confined to rock; it occasionally co-occurs with R. polyforma where their habitats overlap.

== Conservation ==
The IUCN assesses Ramalina fragilis as vulnerable under criterion A3c, projecting about a 40% reduction over three generations (about 45 years, using a 15-year generation length). It is the rarest of the four Ramalina species regarded as Galápagos endemics, with small, scattered subpopulations at roughly twenty sites. The main risks are climate-driven extremes: more frequent and intense El Niño events bring torrential rains, flash floods, and erosion that can strip saxicolous lichens from rock; several coastal localities are also exposed to exceptional high tides and compounded risk from sea level rise. All known sites lie within Galápagos National Park and face little direct tourism pressure, but the assessment recommends keeping visitors on established trails (especially around the Post Office Bay hot-spot area), avoiding activities that erode rock surfaces, and monitoring known sites during and after El Niño years to track impacts.

== See also ==
- List of Ramalina species
