= List of things named after Charles Darwin =

Several places, concepts, institutions, and things are namesakes of the English biologist Charles Darwin:

== Places ==
- Charles Darwin National Park
- Charles Darwin Foundation
- Charles Darwin Research Station
- Charles Darwin School
- Charles Darwin University
- Darwin College, Cambridge
- Darwin, Falkland Islands
- Darwin, Northern Territory
- Darwin Glacier (California)
- Darwin Guyot, a seamount in the Pacific Ocean
- Darwin Island, Galapagos Islands
- Darwin Island (Antarctica)
- Darwin Nature Reserve
- Darwin Sound (Canada)
- Darwin's Arch
- Mount Darwin (Antarctica)
- Mount Darwin (California)
- Mount Darwin (Tasmania)
- Mount Darwin (Zimbabwe)

== Things named after Darwin in relation to his Beagle voyage ==
- Cordillera Darwin
- Darwin's finches
- Darwin's frog
- Darwin's rhea
- Darwin Sound
- Mount Darwin (Andes)

== Scientific names of organisms ==
Some 250 species and several higher groups bear Darwin's name; most are insects.

- Darwinilus, a rove beetle
- Darwinius, an extinct primate
- Darwinopterus, a genus of pterosaur
- Darwinula, a genus of seed shrimp
- Darwinivelia, a water treader genus
- Darwinysius, a seed bug
- Darwinomya, a genus of flies
- Darwinella, a sponge genus
- Darwinsaurus, a dinosaur
- Darwinhydrus, a diving beetle
- darwini (multiple species)
- darwinii (multiple species)
- Minervarya charlesdarwini, a frog
- Ramalina darwiniana, lichen
- Bodianus darwini, a fish of the wrasse family.

== Philosophies ==
- Darwinism
- Social Darwinism

== Other ==
- Darwin, a unit of evolutionary change
- Darwin, an operating system
- Darwin (ESA) (a proposed satellite system)
- Darwin Awards
- Darwin Medal
- Darwin Prize
- Darwin fish
- Division of Darwin, a former electoral division in Australia
- 1991 Darwin, a stony Florian asteroid
- Darwin (lunar crater) a lunar crater
- Darwin (Martian crater) a Martian crater
- Darwinia (plant), species named not after Charles Darwin but his grandfather Erasmus Darwin
- Darwin's tubercle, a congenital ear condition which often presents as a thickening on the helix

== See also ==
- Commemoration of Charles Darwin
- Darwin (disambiguation)
- List of organisms named after famous people
