= History of the Northern Territory =

The history of the Northern Territory began over 60,000 years ago when Indigenous Australians settled the region. Makassan traders began trading with the indigenous people of the Northern Territory for trepang from at least the 18th century onwards.

Europeans first sighted the coast of the future Territory in the 17th century. British groups made attempts to settle the coastal regions of the Territory from 1824 onwards, but no settlement proved successful until the establishment of Port Darwin in 1869.

== Prehistory ==
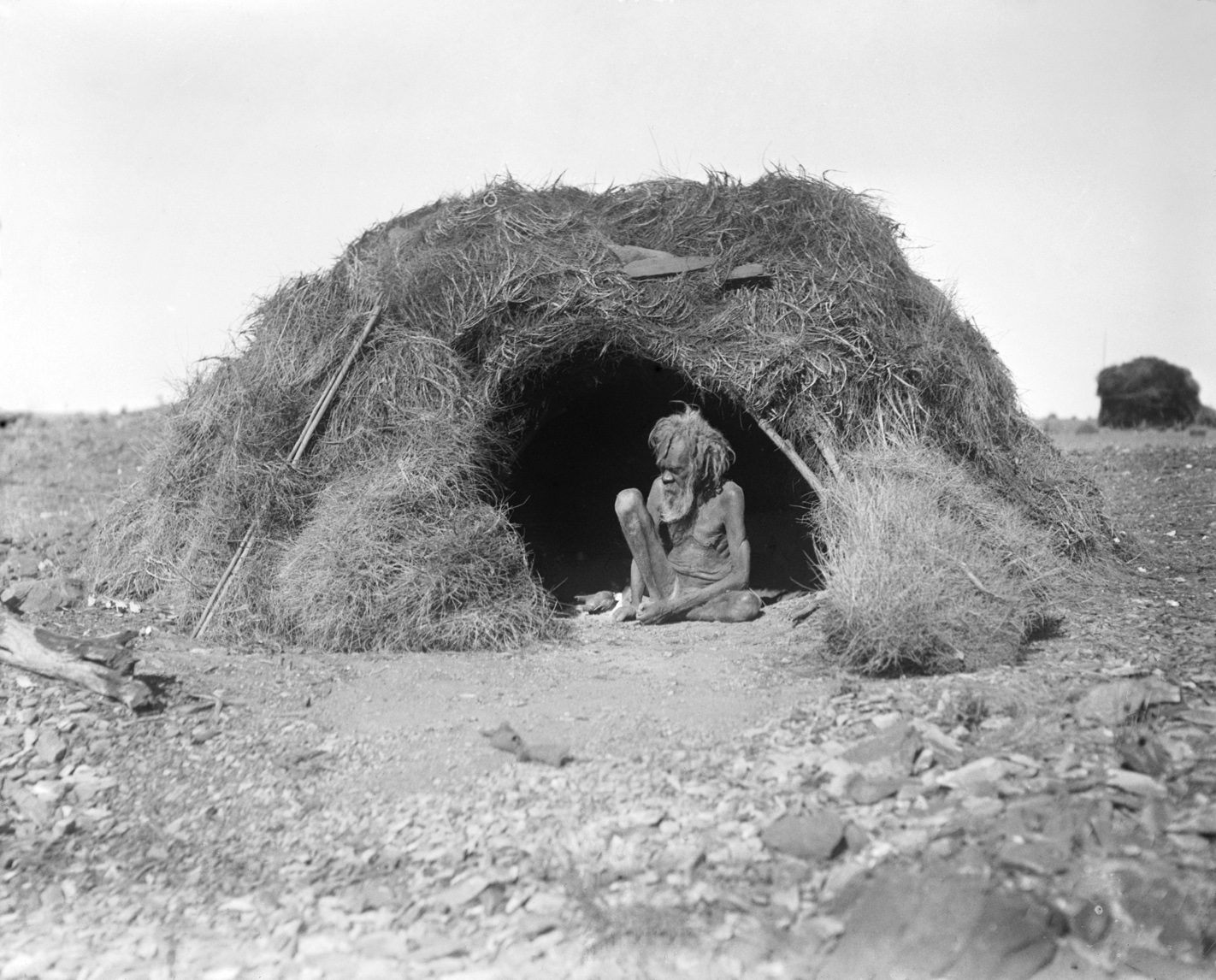
An Arrernte man in a traditional hut in 1920

Although sparse, the archaeological record of the Northern Territory provides evidence of settlement around 60,000 years ago at Malakunanja and Nauwalabila, although there is controversy surrounding the thermoluminescent dating of these sites. During this period, sea levels were 100–150 m (330–490 ft) lower than at present, and Australia and New Guinea along with large tracts of what is now the Timor Sea formed one single landmass.

Abundant and complex rock art testifies to the rich cultural and spiritual lives of the original inhabitants of the Northern Territory, and in many areas of the Northern Territory there is a cultural continuum between the earliest inhabitants and the indigenous population today. Rock art is extremely difficult to date with any reliability, and it can also be difficult to identify a linear sequence of art due to the reworking and reinterpretation of older art by younger generations.

However archaeologists have been able to identify three distinct phases of art: pre-estuarine (dry climate and extinct animals), estuarine (rising sea levels and marine fauna), and freshwater (freshwater fauna, moving into 'historical' subjects such as Makassan traders, and European technology e.g. guns). Rock art also demonstrates cultural and technological changes. For instance, boomerangs give way to broad spearthrowers which give way to long spearthrowers, which give way to guns and boats.

The dingo was introduced from Asia around 3,500 years ago and quickly became integrated into Aboriginal societies, where they played a role in hunting and provided warmth on cold nights.

== Makassan and Baijini trade ==
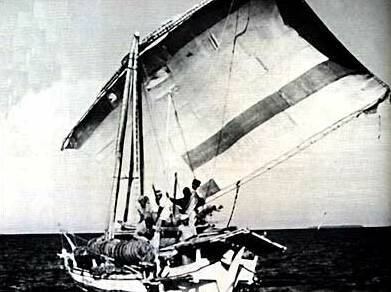
A Macassan perahu or prau

Sailors from the islands north of Australia were trading with northern coast of Australia before the Dutch arrived in the Indonesian Archipelago around 1600 AD. First the Baijini sea gypsy families came to trade for pearls and for oyster and turtle shell. The Baijini brought their entire families and built houses of stone and ironbark. They planted rice in Warrimiri country and Gumatj country. Later the people who traded out of Makassar came in search of trepang, which was prized for its culinary and medicinal values in Chinese markets. The Makassar came only to collect trepang, never setting up permanent camps with crops, apart from dropped tamarind seeds that sprouted. The annual Makassan voyages to the Kimberly and Arnhem Land dated from the 1700s, and ended in 1907 thanks to Australian regulations. However, there are reports of visits perhaps 300 years prior to that, and extended from the Kimberleys in the west, to the east of Gulf of Carpentaria. The Makassans had extensive contact with the indigenous tribes of the Northern Territory, trading cloth, knives, alcohol, and tobacco for the right to fish in Territory waters and use Aboriginal labour.

== European exploration and settlement ==
The first recorded sighting of the Northern Territory coastline was by Dutch navigator Willem Janszoon aboard the ship Duyfken in 1606. Abel Tasman and numerous French navigators also charted the coast, naming many prominent features. Captain Phillip Parker King also made surveys of the coast.

Following British settlement in New South Wales in 1788, four unsuccessful attempts were made to settle coastal areas of the Northern Territory prior to the establishment of Darwin.

=== 1824–1838 ===
On 30 September 1824, British Captain Gordon Bremer established Fort Dundas on Melville Island as a part of the Colony of New South Wales. Fort Dundas was the first settlement in Northern Australia. However, poor relations with the Tiwi people, cyclones, and other difficulties of tropical living, led to the Fort being abandoned in 1828. A second settlement was established on the Cobourg Peninsula at Raffles Bay on 18 June 1827. Fort Wellington was founded by Captain James Stirling, but it was also abandoned in 1829.

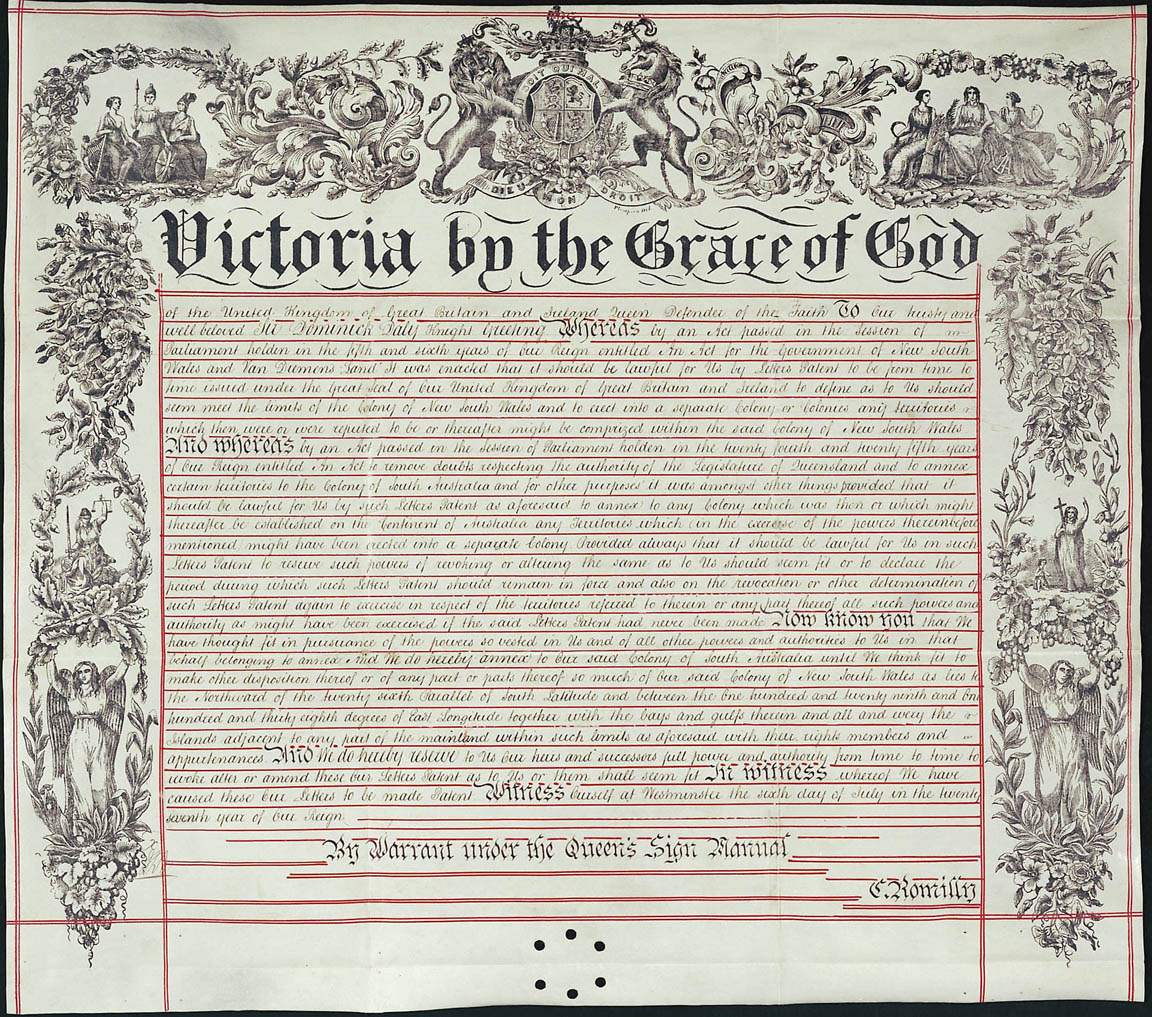
Letters Patent annexing the Northern Territory to South Australia, 1863

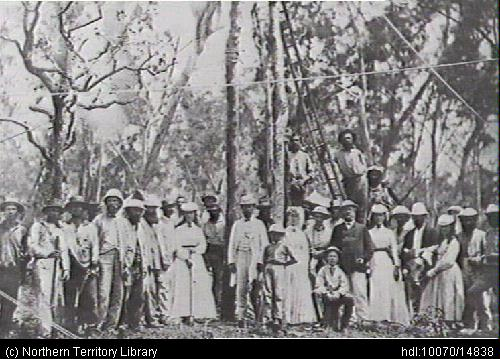
Planting the first telegraph pole, near Palmerston (Darwin) in September 1870

=== 1838–1861 ===
The British made a third attempt in 1838, establishing Fort Victoria at Port Essington on 27 October 1838. Gordon Bremer was also in command of the new settlement, which was visited in July 1839 by HMS Beagle and her crew. Bremer left in 1839 and, following his departure, conditions in the settlement deteriorated. The Prussian naturalist and explorer Ludwig Leichhardt, travelled from Moreton Bay, overland to Port Essington. An unsuccessful migration scheme was tried, and the first Catholic priest, Father Angelo Confalonieri, arrived in the area in 1846. However, the settlement disbanded on 1 December 1849.

European explorers made their last great, often arduous, and sometimes tragic, expeditions into the interior of Australia during the second half of the 19th century – some with the official sponsorship of the colonial authorities and others commissioned by private investors. By 1850, large areas of the inland were still unknown to Europeans. Trailblazers like Edmund Kennedy, and Ludwig Leichhardt, had met tragic ends during the 1840s, attempting to fill in the gaps, but explorers remained ambitious to discover new lands for agriculture or answer scientific questions. Surveyors also acted as explorers and the colonies sent out expeditions to discover the best routes for lines of communication. The size of expeditions varied considerably, from small parties of just two or three, to large, well-equipped teams, led by gentlemen explorers assisted by smiths, carpenters, labourers and Aboriginal guides, and accompanied by horses, camels or bullocks.

=== 1862–1868 ===
In 1862, John McDouall Stuart succeeded in traversing Central Australia from south to north. His expedition mapped out the route which was later followed by the Australian Overland Telegraph Line. Stuart wanted the newly discovered region to be called "Alexandra Land", in honour of the Princess of Wales. The name was gazetted in 1865 applying to the portion South of 16°S of what is now the Northern Territory. For some time, Northern Territory including Arnhem Land referred only to the region north of that line.

In 1863, the Northern Territory was annexed by South Australia by letters patent. Following the annexation, a fourth attempt at settlement occurred in 1864 at Escape Cliffs, about 75 km (47 mi) from present-day Darwin. Colonel Boyle Travers Finniss was responsible for the settlement. There were numerous confrontations with the local Marananggu people, and when he was recalled to Adelaide in 1867, the settlement disbanded. The South Australian government also tried to find sites for additional settlements, sending explorer John McKinlay to search in the region of the Adelaide River, but he had no success.

=== 1869–1900 ===
On 5 February 1869, George Goyder, the Surveyor-General of South Australia, established a small settlement of 135 men and women at Port Darwin. Goyder named the settlement Palmerston, after the British Prime Minister Lord Palmerston. In 1870, the first poles for the Overland Telegraph were erected in Darwin.

Uluru and Kata Tjuta were first mapped by Europeans in 1872, during the expeditionary period made possible by the construction of the Australian Overland Telegraph Line. In separate expeditions, Ernest Giles and William Gosse were the first European explorers to the area. While exploring the area in 1872, Giles sighted Kata Tjuta from a location near Kings Canyon, naming it Mount Olga for Queen Olga of Württemberg, and in the following year, Gosse observed Uluru and named it Ayers Rock, in honour of the Premier of South Australia Sir Henry Ayers. The barren desert lands of Central Australia disappointed the Europeans as unpromising for pastoral expansion, but would later come to be appreciated as emblematic of Australia.

The construction of the Overland Telegraph, connecting Australia to the rest of the world, led to more exploration of the interior of the Territory, and the discovery of gold at Pine Creek in the 1880s drove further economic development

== 20th century ==
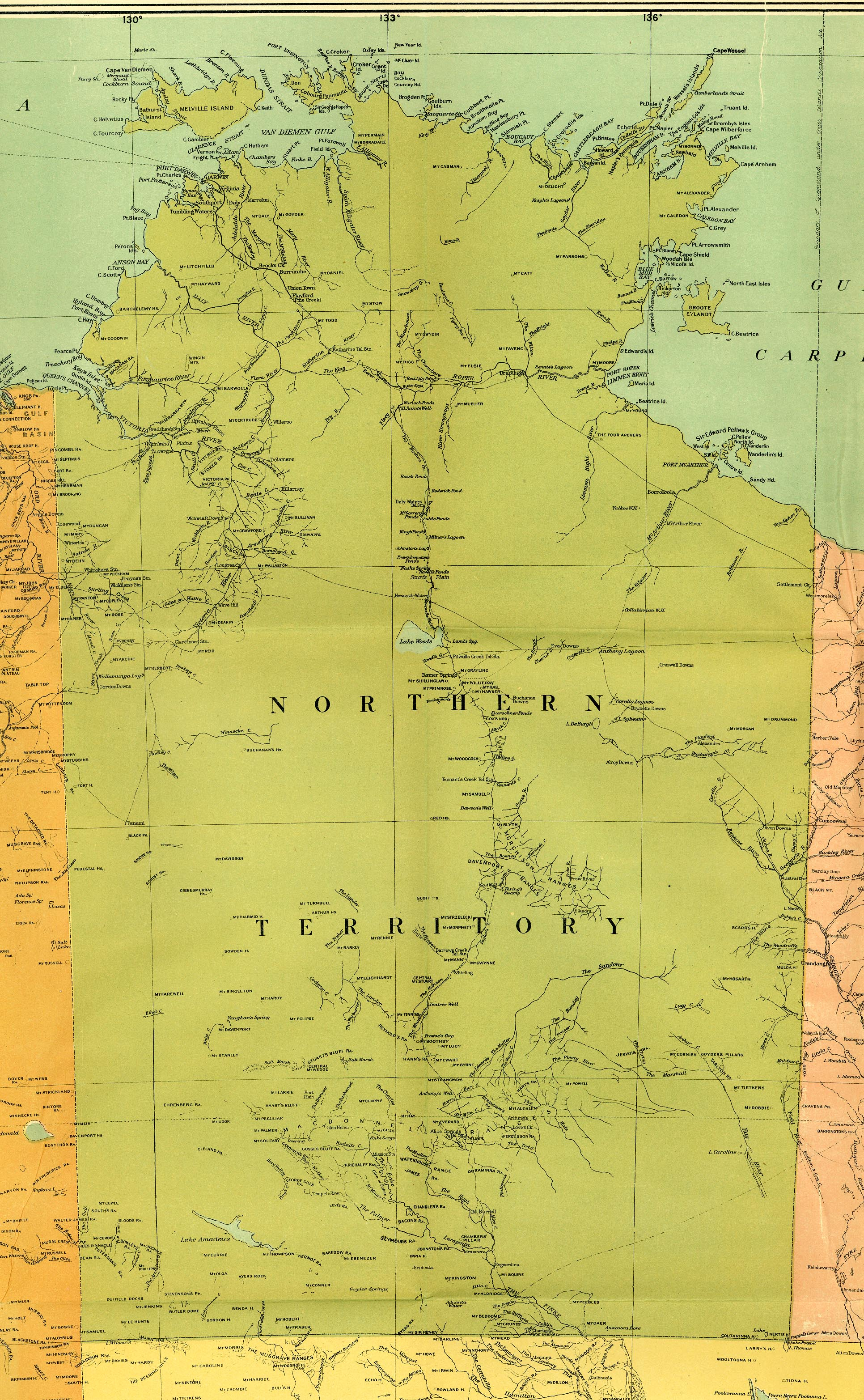
Map of the Northern Territory in 1916

On 1 January 1911, a decade after federation, the Northern Territory was separated from South Australia and transferred to Australian government control, under the South Australian Northern Territory Surrender Act 1907, and the federal Northern Territory Acceptance Act 1910. The Northern Territory (Administration) Act provided that there would be an Administrator appointed by the Governor-General to administer the Territory on behalf of the Australian Government, subject to any instructions given to him by the appropriate Minister from time to time.

In late 1912, there was growing sentiment that the name "Northern Territory" was unsatisfactory. The names "Kingsland" (after King George V and to correspond with Queensland), "Centralia" and "Territoria" were proposed, with Kingsland becoming the preferred choice in 1913. However, the name change never went ahead.

For a brief time between 1926 and 1931, the Northern Territory was divided into North Australia and Central Australia at the 20th parallel south of latitude. Soon after that, under the Kimberley Scheme, parts of the Northern Territory were considered as a possible site for the establishment of a Jewish Homeland, but it was understandably considered to be the "Unpromised Land".

=== Central Australia ===
Between 1918 and 1921, large areas of the Territory and adjacent states were classified as Aboriginal reserves and sanctuaries for remaining nomadic populations who had hitherto had little contact with Europeans. In 1920, the area including Uluru, in Anangu territory, was declared an Aboriginal Reserve under the Aboriginals Ordinance (Northern Territory). Nevertheless, small numbers of non-Aboriginal people continued to visit the area, including missionaries, adventurers, native welfare patrol officers and dingo scalpers. In 1931, the gold prospector Harold Lasseter died in the area, while searching for his famous reef of gold. The return of pastoralists to the region created conflict with the Aboriginal people, amid competition for scarce resources. In 1940, the reserve was reduced in size to facilitate access for gold prospecting.

Tourists had begun arriving at Uluru in 1936. A vehicular track was made in 1948. Post-war assimilation policies anticipated that the Pitjantjatjara and Yankunytjatjara people would assimilate into Australian society and welfare authorities moved them to Aboriginal settlements to facilitate this process.

=== Caledon Bay crisis ===
The Caledon Bay crisis of 1932–34 saw one of the last incidents of violent interaction on the 'frontier' between indigenous and non-indigenous Australians. It began with the spearing of Japanese poachers who had been molesting Yolngu women, and was followed by the killing of a policeman. As the crisis unfolded, national opinion swung behind the Aboriginal people involved, and the first appeal on behalf of an Indigenous Australian to the High Court of Australia was launched. Following the crisis, the anthropologist Donald Thomson was dispatched by the government to live among the Yolngu.

=== World War Two ===
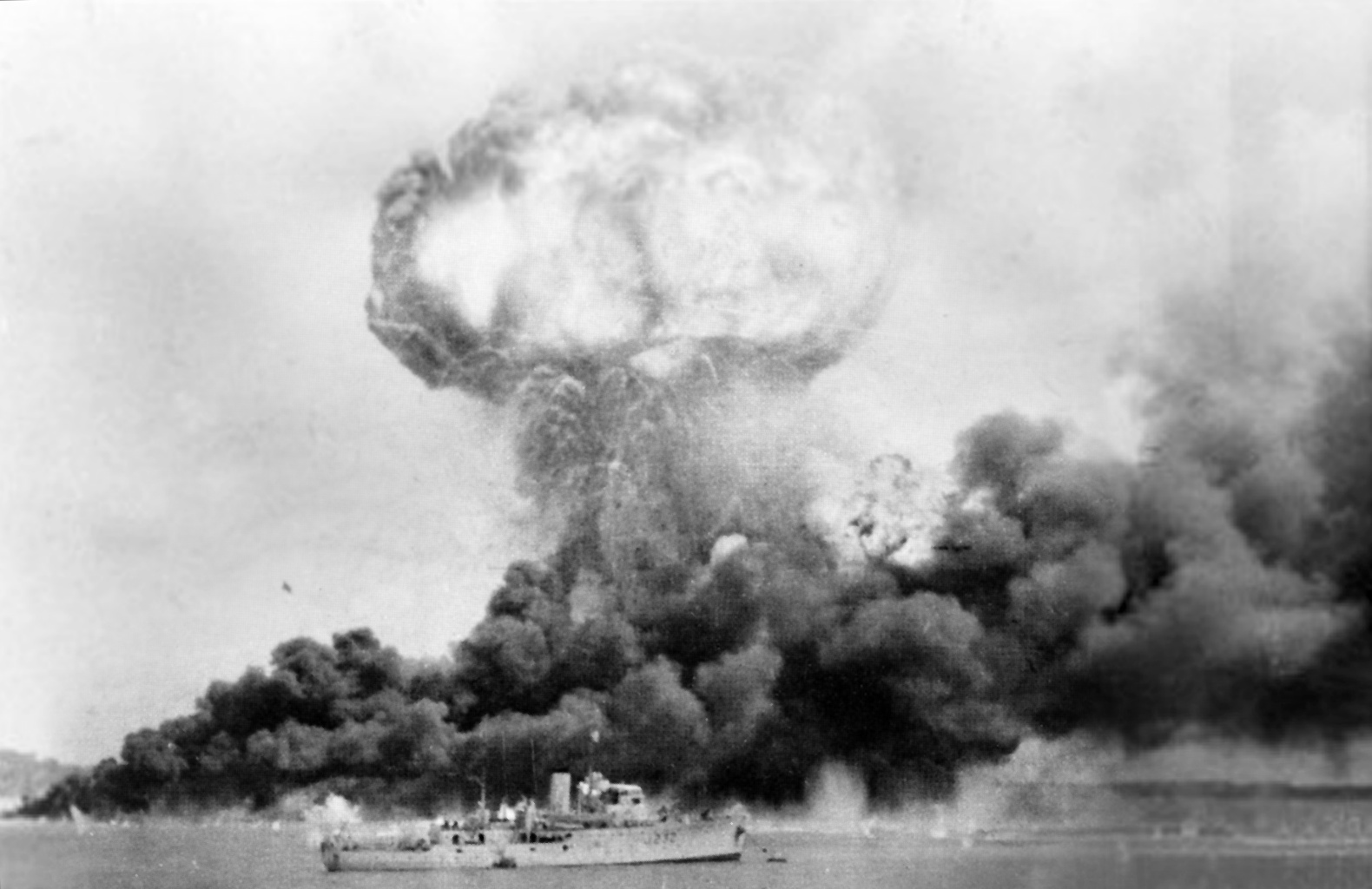
The Bombing of Darwin, 19 February 1942. During World War II the Territory suffered attacks from Imperial Japan.

Australia declared war on Nazi Germany following its invasion of Poland in 1939. After Japan entered the war in 1941, the Northern Territory came under direct attack. With most of Australia's best forces committed to fight against Hitler in the Middle East, Japan attacked Pearl Harbor, the US naval base in Hawaii, on 8 December 1941 (eastern Australia time). The British battleship HMS Prince of Wales and battle cruiser HMS Repulse sent to defend Singapore were sunk soon afterwards. British Malaya quickly collapsed, shocking the Australian nation. After the Fall of Singapore, Australian Prime Minister Curtin predicted that the "battle for Australia" would follow and, on 19 February, Darwin suffered a devastating air raid. Over the following 19 months, Australia was attacked from the air almost 100 times.

=== Aboriginal land rights ===
Indigenous Australians had struggled for rights to fair wages and land. An important event in this struggle was the strike and walk off by the Gurindji people at Wave Hill, cattle station in 1966. The Commonwealth Government of Gough Whitlam set up the Woodward Royal Commission in February 1973 set to inquire into how land rights might be achieved in the Northern Territory. Justice Woodward's first report in July 1973 recommended that a Central Land Council and a Northern Land Council be established in order to present to him the views of Aboriginal people. In response to the report of the Royal Commission a Land Rights Bill was drafted, but the Whitlam government was dismissed before it was passed.

The Aboriginal Land Rights (Northern Territory) Act 1976 was eventually passed by the Fraser government on 16 December 1976 and began operation on Australia Day, that is 26 January 1977.

=== Political representation ===
From 1863 to 1911, the Northern Territory was a part of South Australia. In 1890, South Australia made the Northern Territory a separate electoral district with two parliamentary representatives and granted the vote to its adult males (and adult females from 1895). Indigenous Australians also had the right to vote. Their status as South Australian voters also qualified them to vote in elections for both Houses of the Commonwealth Parliament at the first federal elections in 1901. In 1911, however, the Northern Territory was transferred to the Commonwealth government. The territory was placed under the direct control of the federal Minister for External Affairs and the population had no parliamentary representation or voting rights. At the time of the Commonwealth takeover, the Territory's population was 3,031.

In 1922 the territory was granted one representative in the Australian House of Representatives. The member could speak in the House and take part in committee work, but could not vote, and did not count for the purpose of forming government. Indigenous people were excluded from voting for the representative. Between 1936 and 1959 the Member was only able to vote in motions to disallow laws made for the Territory, and between 1959 and 1968, the Member could only vote on matters relating to the Territory alone. In 1968, the Member for Northern Territory acquired full voting rights.

In 1947, the territory was granted a Legislative Council with six elected members and seven members appointed by the Administrator for the Northern Territory. Adult European residents of the territory were entitled to vote. In 1962, Aboriginal Territorians were granted the right to vote in territorial and federal elections.

In 1974, a fully elected Legislative Assembly was established and the Northern Territory had its first representative parliament. In 1977 the Commonwealth Parliament passed the Northern Territory (Self-Government) Act and the territory achieved responsible government. In 1978, the first ministry was established and the assembly was given responsibility for the finances of the territory.

After the 1974 federal election, the Whitlam Labor government legislation to give the Australian Capital Territory and the Northern Territory representation in the Australian Senate, with two senators being elected from each, was passed by the subsequent Joint Sitting of parliament.

=== Self-government ===
In 1978 the Territory was granted responsible government, with a Legislative Assembly headed by a Chief Minister, publishing official notices in its own Government Gazette.

The Country Liberal Party (CLP) was established in the Northern Territory in 1974 by supporters of the Liberal and Country Parties of Australia living in the Territory; thereafter it enjoyed considerable electoral success. The Party has contested general elections in the Territory since 1974 and saw unbroken electoral success from 1974 until 2001 when it lost office to the Australian Labor Party. Clare Martin won a surprise victory at the 2001 territory election, becoming the first Labor Party, and first female Chief Minister. The ALP member for Arafura Marion Scrymgour, became the Labor Party Deputy Chief Minister of the Northern Territory from November 2007 until February 2009. She was the highest-ranked indigenous person in government in Australia's history. She was also the first indigenous woman to be elected to the Northern Territory Parliament.

The 2012 Northern Territory general election ended 11 years of Labor rule and saw Terry Mills defeat the Incumbent Labor government led by Paul Henderson. The victory was also notable for the support it achieved from indigenous people in pastoral and remote electorates. Large swings were achieved in remote Territory electorates (where the indigenous population comprised around two thirds of voters) and a total of five Aboriginal CLP candidates won election to the Assembly. Among the Aboriginal candidates elected was high-profile Aboriginal activist Bess Price and former Labor member Alison Anderson. Anderson was appointed Minister for Indigenous Advancement. In her first ministerial statement on the status of Aboriginal communities in the Territory she said the CLP would focus on improving education and on helping create real jobs for indigenous people. However, Alison Anderson resigned from the CLP in 2014, along with two other indigenous MPs, briefly becoming an independent once again. On 27 April 2014 the three MLAs had joined the Palmer United Party, with Anderson serving as parliamentary leader

== Recent history ==
The Northern Territory was briefly in 1995-6 one of the few places in the world with legal voluntary euthanasia, until the Federal Parliament overturned the legislation. Before the overriding legislation was enacted, three people had been voluntarily euthanized by Dr Philip Nitschke.

In 2007, the Australian Federal Government implemented the Northern Territory National Emergency Response (also referred to as "the intervention") a controversial policy package that enforced welfare, law enforcement and land provision measures to address allegations of child sexual abuse and neglect in Northern Territory Aboriginal Communities. The initiative attracted controversy for its implementation – including the overturning of the Racial Discrimination Act 1975, the deployment of over 600 Australian Defence Force personnel into Aboriginal communities, lack of community consultation and compulsory acquisition of townships. It has been condemned as nothing more than a hasty reaction to allegations made in 2006 regarding child sexual assault in Aboriginal communities. As well as this, some view it as another attempt by the government to control these communities.

== See also ==
- History of Darwin
- Timeline of Darwin history
