= History of Darwin =

Overview of the Australian city's development

The history of Darwin details the city's growth from a fledgling settlement into a thriving colonial capital and a modern city.

== Early history ==
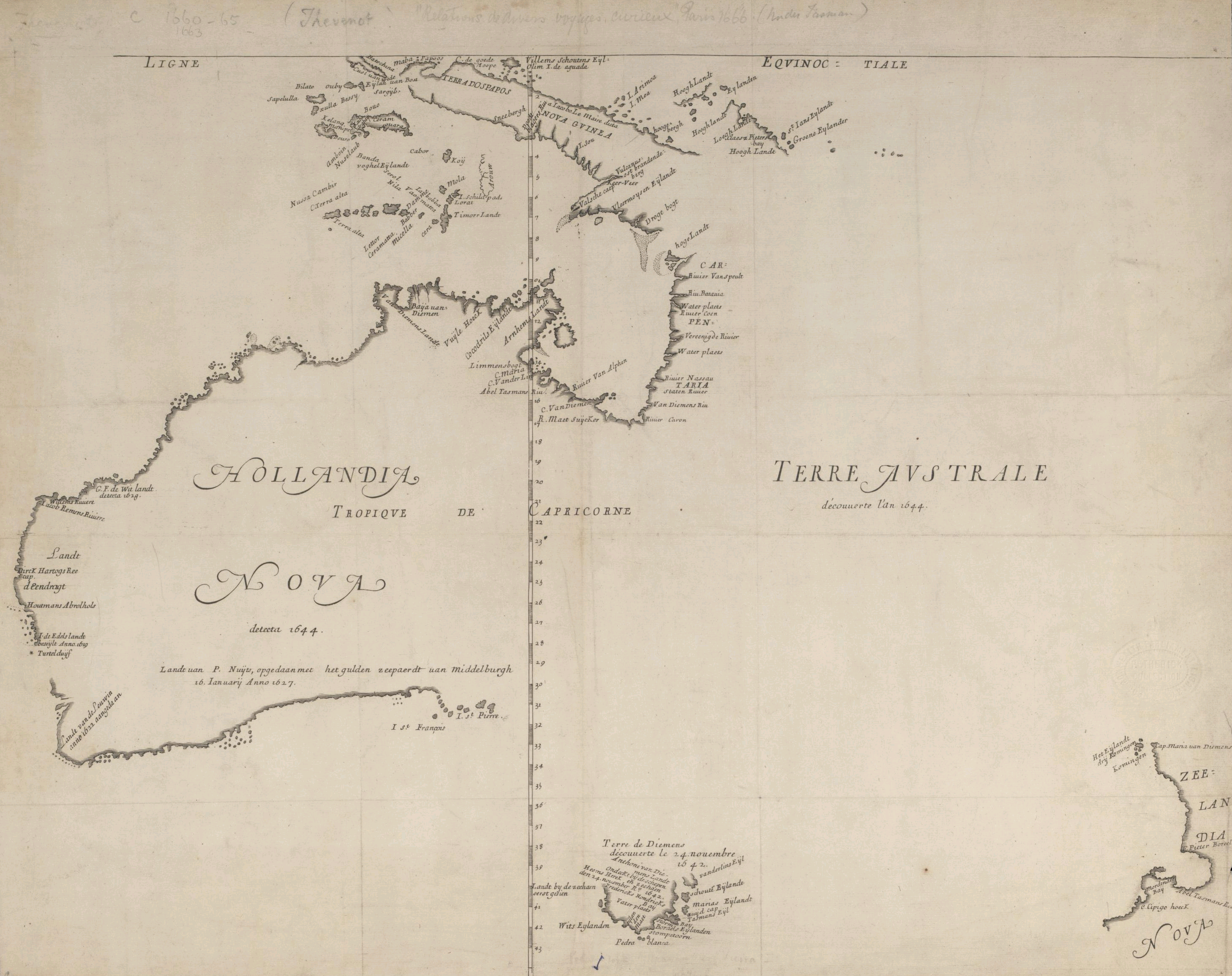
A 1644 European map of Australia, Melchisédech Thévenot

The Aboriginal people of the Larrakia language group lived in the greater Darwin Region before European settlement. They had trading routes with Southeast Asia (see Macassan contact with Australia), and imported goods from as far as South Australia and Western Australia. Established songlines penetrated throughout the country, allowing stories and histories to be told and retold along the routes.

The Dutch visited Australia's northern coastline in the 17th century, and created the first European maps of the area, hence the Dutch names in the area, such as Arnhem Land and Groote Eylandt, which bears the original old Dutch spelling for "large island".

== 1800s ==
Lieutenant John Lort Stokes of HMS Beagle was the first British person to encounter Darwin harbour on 9 September 1839, 51 years after the first European settlement of Australia. The ship's captain, Commander John Clements Wickham, named the port after Charles Darwin, the English naturalist who had sailed with them both on the earlier second expedition of the Beagle. In 1869, a permanent European settlement was established by the South Australian Government, who had responsibility for the Territory at that time.

On 5 February 1869, George Goyder, the Surveyor-General of South Australia, established a small settlement of 135 men and women at Port Darwin. Goyder named the settlement Palmerston, after the British Prime Minister Lord Palmerston. The Port of Darwin was first used for modern commerce in 1869. It was used to supply the new settlement of Palmerston.

In the 1870s, the 3,200-kilometre (2,000 mi) Australian Overland Telegraph Line was built between Port Augusta and Darwin, connecting Australia to the rest of the world. During the construction, workers discovered gold near Pine Creek, about 200 kilometres (120 mi) south of Darwin, which further boosted the young colony's development. In 1872, Government House, also known as the House of Seven Gables, was built. In the 1880s it was pulled down and rebuilt.

In February 1875, the SS Gothenburg left Darwin for Adelaide with approximately 100 passengers and 34 crew (surviving records vary). Many passengers and crew were Darwin residents. On 24 February, in heavy storms she hit a reef at low tide off the north Queensland coast and sank with the loss of about 102 lives. The tragedy severely affected Darwin's population and economy and it was slow to recover. Another ship, the SS Ellengowan, sank in Darwin harbour on 27 April 1888.

The Fannie Bay Gaol was built between 1882 and 1883.

In the 1870s, Chinese began to settle at least temporarily in the Northern Territory, many of whom worked the goldfields and on the Palmerston to Pine Creek railway. By 1888 there were 6,122 Chinese in the Northern Territory, mostly in or around Darwin. The early Chinese settlers were mainly from the Kwantung/Guangdong Province in southern China. At the end of the nineteenth century, anti Chinese feelings grew in response to the 1890s economic depression and the White Australia policy, with many Chinese leaving the Territory. Some families stayed, became Australian citizens, and established a commercial base in Darwin.

In 1884, the pearling industry brought people from Japan, Timor and the Philippines, many of whose descendants are prominent families in Darwin today.

In 1897, the settlement was completely destroyed by a cyclone which killed 28 people.

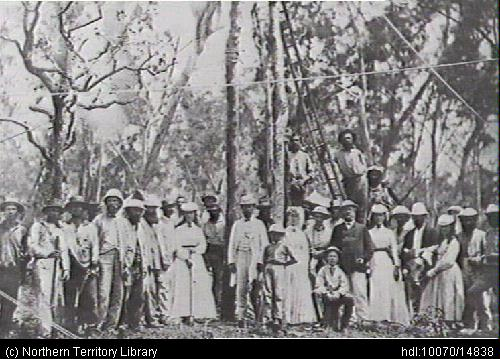
The planting of the first telegraph pole on 15 September 1870.

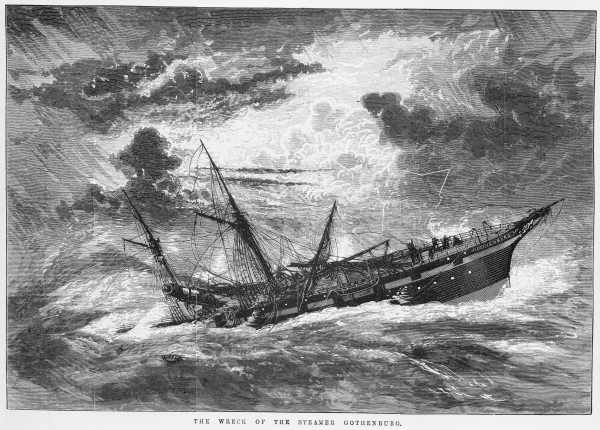
Wreck of the SS Gothenburg.

== 1900s ==
Historical Populations of Darwin
| Year | Pop. | ±% |
|---|---|---|
| 1911 | 1,082 | — |
| 1921 | 1,399 | +29.3% |
| 1933 | 1,566 | +11.9% |
| 1947 | 2,538 | +62.1% |
| 1954 | 8,071 | +218.0% |
| 1961 | 15,477 | +91.8% |
| 1966 | 21,671 | +40.0% |
| 1971 | 37,100 | +71.2% |
| 1976 | 44,200 | +19.1% |
| 1981 | 61,412 | +38.9% |
| 1986 | 75,360 | +22.7% |
| 1991 | 86,415 | +14.7% |
| 1996 | 95,829 | +10.9% |
| 2001 | 106,842 | +11.5% |
| 2006 | 105,991 | −0.8% |
| 2009 | 124,800 | +17.7% |
| 2010 | 127,829 | +2.4% |
| 2011 | 129,106 | +1.0% |
| 2012 | 132,321 | +2.5% |
| 2013 | 137,353 | +3.8% |
| 2014 | 140,386 | +2.2% |

In 1911, the city's name changed from Palmerston to Darwin. The Northern Territory was initially settled and administered by South Australia, until its transfer to the Commonwealth in 1911.

=== Darwin Rebellion ===
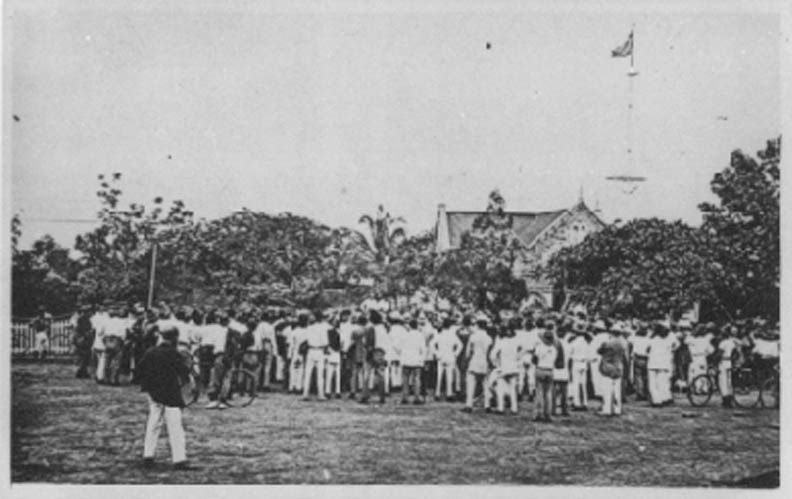
Demonstrators during the 1918 Darwin Rebellion.

On 17 December 1918, the Darwin Rebellion occurred. During the rebellion, members of the Australian Workers' Union, led by Harold Nelson, burnt an effigy of the Administrator of the Northern Territory, John Gilruth at Government House, and demanded his resignation.

=== Bombing of Darwin ===
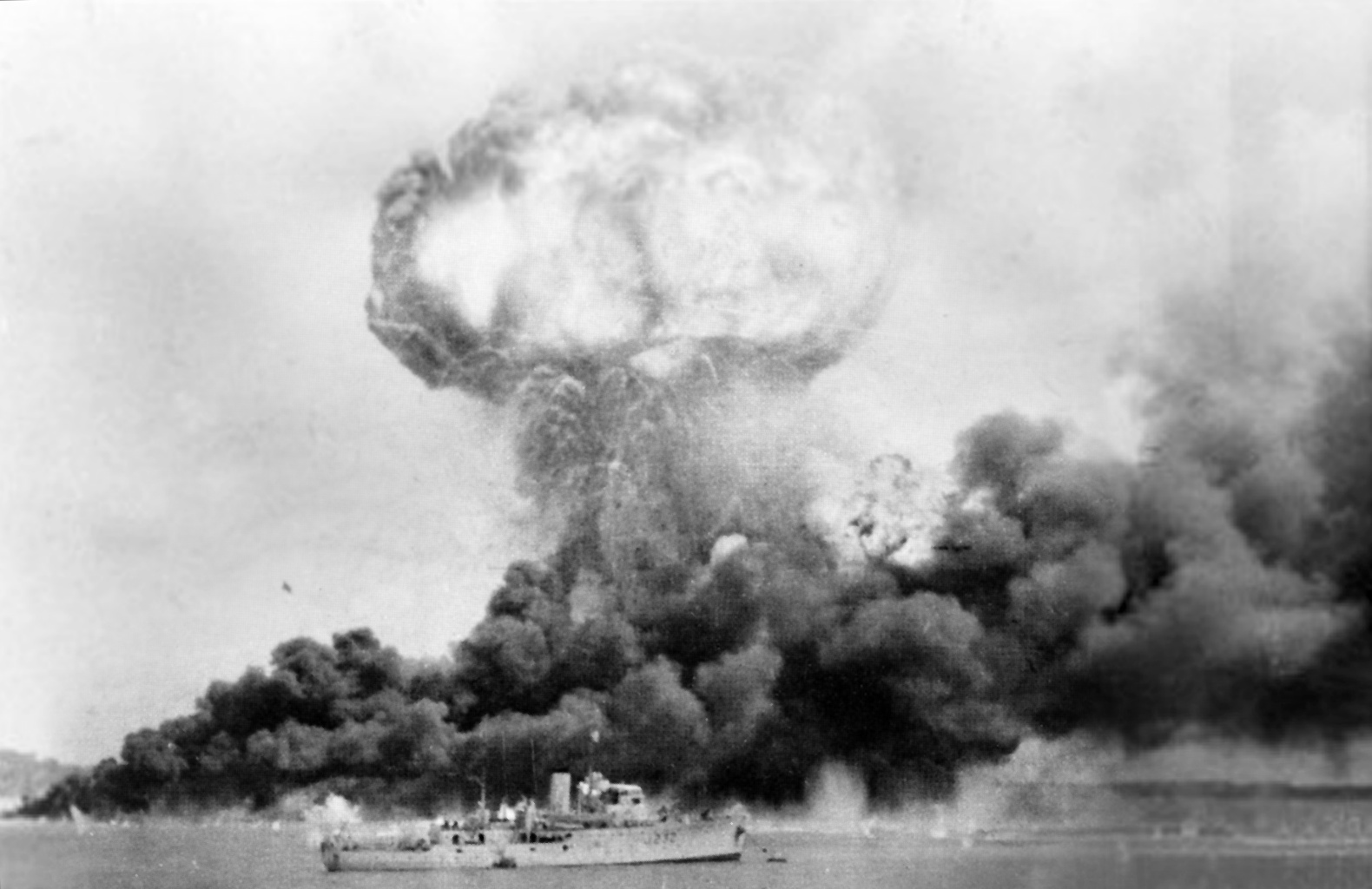
The explosion of an oil storage tank during the bombing of Darwin, 1942.

On 19 February 1942, at 9:57 am, during World War II, 188 Japanese warplanes attacked Darwin in two waves. The incoming Japanese planes were first spotted by Father John McGrath at the Bathurst Island Mission north of Darwin. McGrath radioed at 9:30 am and the sirens wailed at 9:57 am. It was the same fleet that had bombed Pearl Harbor, and although it was a less significant target, a greater number of bombs were dropped on Darwin than were used in the attack on Pearl Harbor.

The attack killed at least 243 people and caused immense damage to Darwin. They were the most serious war-time attacks on Australia, in terms of fatalities and damage. They were the first of many raids on Darwin.

This event is often called the "Pearl Harbor of Australia". As was the case at Pearl Harbor, Darwin was unprepared, and although it came under attack from the air another 58 times in 1942 and 1943, the raids on 19 February were massive and devastating by comparison.

On 2 May 1943, another significant raid was conducted by the Japanese.

In 1959, Darwin was granted city status on Australia Day (26 January).

=== Cyclone Tracy ===
On 25 December 1974, Darwin was struck by Cyclone Tracy. It killed 71 people and destroyed over 70% of Darwin's buildings, including many old stone buildings such as the Palmerston Town Hall, the Old Police Station, the Court House and Cell Block. Buildings along the Esplanade, which runs along Lameroo Beach, could not withstand the lateral forces generated by the strong winds.

It was Australia's worst natural disaster. The anemometer at Darwin Airport recorded winds of 217 kilometres per hour (135 mph) at 3:00 am before it stopped working. Winds of up to 250 kilometres per hour (160 mph) were estimated to have hit the city. The total damage cost $1 billion. Sixteen people were lost at sea, their bodies never recovered. The historic schooner Booya sunk due to the cyclone.

After the disaster, an airlift evacuated 30,000 people, which was the biggest airlift in Australia's history. The population was evacuated by air and ground transportation. Due to communications difficulties with Darwin airport, landing was limited to one plane every ninety minutes. At major airports, teams of Salvation Army and Red Cross workers met refugees, with the Red Cross taking responsibility for keeping track of the names and temporary addresses of the refugees.

Evacuations were prioritised according to need. Women, children, the elderly and sick were evacuated first. There were reports of men dressing up as women to escape with the early evacuations.

By 31 December only 10,900 people remained in Darwin, mostly men who were required to help clean up the city. Darwin enacted a permit system. Permits were only issued to those who were involved in either the relief or reconstruction efforts, and were used to prevent the early return of those who were evacuated.

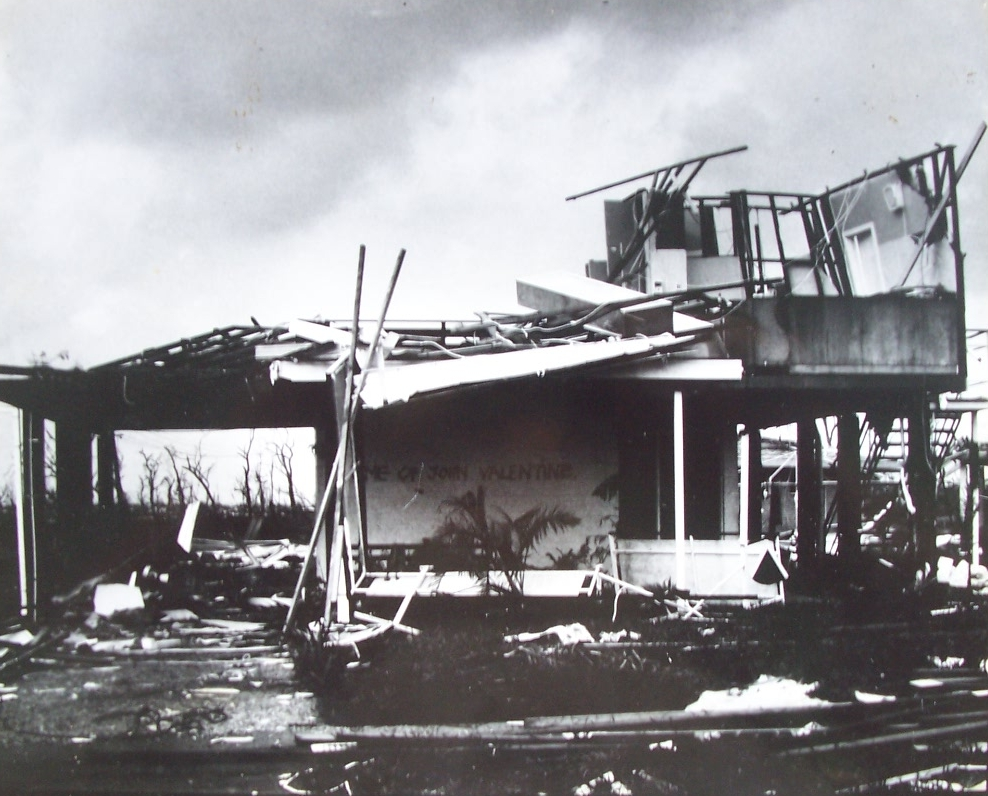
A house in Nakara, Northern suburbs, after Tracy.

== Post 1970s ==
In the late 1970s, Darwin was rebuilt with newer materials and techniques by the Darwin Reconstruction Commission. In the early 1980s, a satellite city of Palmerston was built 20 kilometres (12 mi) south of Darwin.

As a result of air raids and cyclones, Darwin has few historic buildings, although some of the stronger stone structures survived and have been restored. Since Cyclone Tracy all buildings are constructed to a strict cyclone code. Steel is a popular building material and led to a distinctive modern style associated with Darwin, known as Troppo. Southeast Asian influences are also present in some of the architecture. A growing population and relatively scarce land has seen a boom in high rise apartment style housing in recent years, especially around the central business district and coastal fringes.

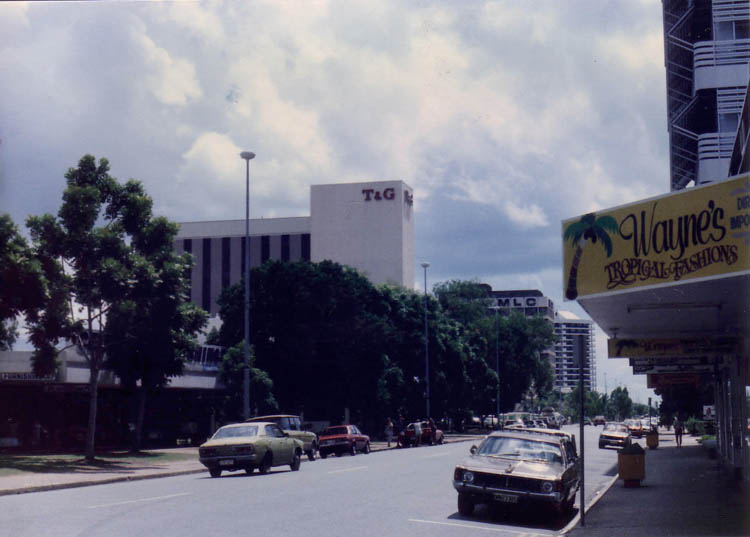
The Darwin CBD in 1986.

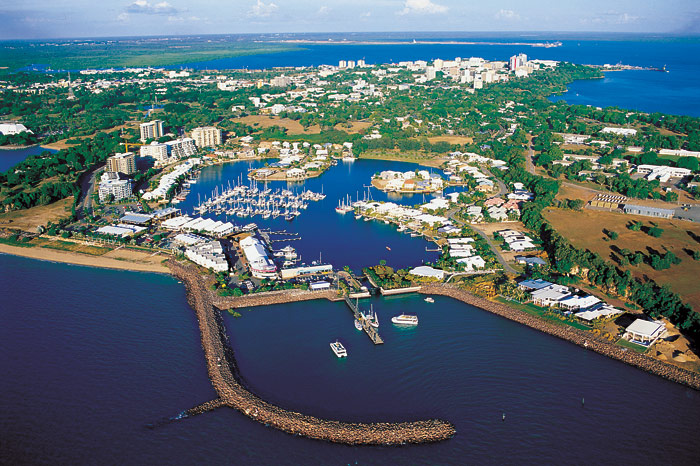
An aerial view of Darwin, 2007.

== See also ==
- Timeline of Darwin History
- History of the Northern Territory
- Aviation history of Darwin
