= Eastern and African Cold Storage Supply Company =

The Eastern and African Cold Storage Supply Co. Ltd. was an Anglo-Australian consortium that existed in the early 1900s which was involved in the commercial business of mass production and cold storage of beef. It was based in London and South Australia, with much of its cattle-raising operations being located on the massive Arafura cattle station in the Arnhem Land region of the Northern Territory. The Company remains known today due to its ruthless policy of employing armed gangs to patrol the company's land and shoot on sight any of the resident Aboriginal Australians that they encountered.

== Formation ==
The Company was formed in 1903 with a starting market capitalisation of £75,000 and a 42 year lease from the Government of South Australia on a parcel of land 20,000 square miles in size. This was the Arafura property which was a consolidation of two previous pastoral leases known as the Florida and Wongalara stations. The company also purchased the adjoining Elsey, Hodgson Downs and Wollogorang cattle stations. This land was exempt from normal rental fees and stock regulations. There was a board of directors both in London and in South Australia which included prominent colonists such as Sir John Cockburn and William Acton Adams.

== Patrols to shoot Aboriginal people ==
During its existence, the Company employed two gangs of up to fourteen people each to patrol and shoot resident Aboriginal people living on the Company's property. George Conway was hired to head one of these patrols in 1905-06 when he and his group shot dozens of Aboriginal people.

== Collapse of the Company ==
In 1906 the Company suffered significant financial burdens and sold off Elsey Station. In 1908 the Company terminated all its operations and went into liquidation the following year.
