= Timmy 'Djawa' Burarrwanga =

Aboriginal Australian businessman and cultural leader

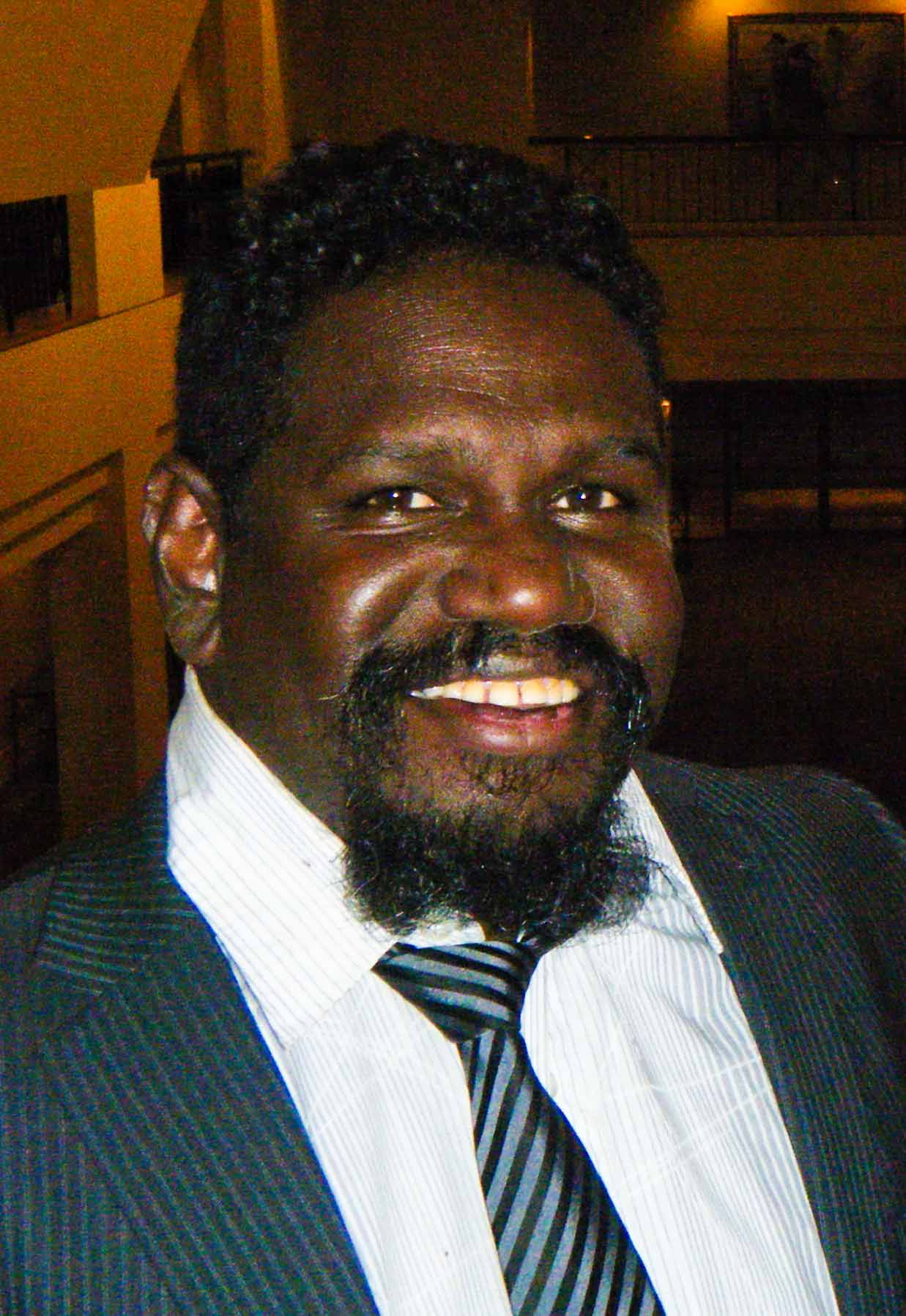

Timmy Murmurrga Burarrwanga, also known by his tribal name Djawa Djuwait, is an Aboriginal Australian who belongs to the Gumatj clan. He is a business operator, cultural leader and current chairman of the Yirrkala Dhanbul Aboriginal Corporation, a community development organization associated with the Bunuwal group of companies. He was formerly a director of the Lanyhapuy Homelands Association, and is heavily active in the outstation movement, numerous other Aboriginal organizations, and has lent his support to the One Laptop Per Child Australia group.

== Aboriginal tourism initiatives ==
Burarrwanga has spent much of his time working toward authenticity in Aboriginal tourism, a culmination of which was the creation of Lirrwi Tourism in 2010.

=== Bawaka ===
With his family he operates Bawaka, an Indigenous tourism venture that operates on their ancestral homeland in north eastern Arnhem Land, in the Northern Territory of Australia. Together they move between Yirrkala and Bawaka to welcome small groups of people from across Australia and from around the world to share their culture and history. One of Burarrwanga's initiatives is promoting tourism as a culturally appropriate way of Aboriginal people earning a living and has welcomed numerous high-profile Australians to Bawaka to participate in a number of cultural awareness programs on offer. Renowned chef Tony Bilson is one of many people who have spent time at Bawaka.

=== Garma Festival ===
Burarrwanga has been actively involved in the management of cultural programs at the annual Garma Festival of Traditional Cultures held at the Gulkula site in north eastern Arnhem Land. A keynote speech involved his experiences in developing his own company and the importance of employing and training Yolŋu people at home, to give them respect and responsibilities for their rights and for their future. This led to the 2012 launch of the Yolngu Cultural Tourism Masterplan, the first of its kind in Australia.

== Constitutional recognition of Indigenous Australians ==
In December 2010 the Australian Government announced that Burarrwanga was invited to join other prominent members to sit on the "Expert Panel" on constitutional recognition of Indigenous Australians. The role of the panel was to lead a wide-ranging national public consultation and engagement program throughout 2011, before reporting its findings to the Australian Government by December 2011.

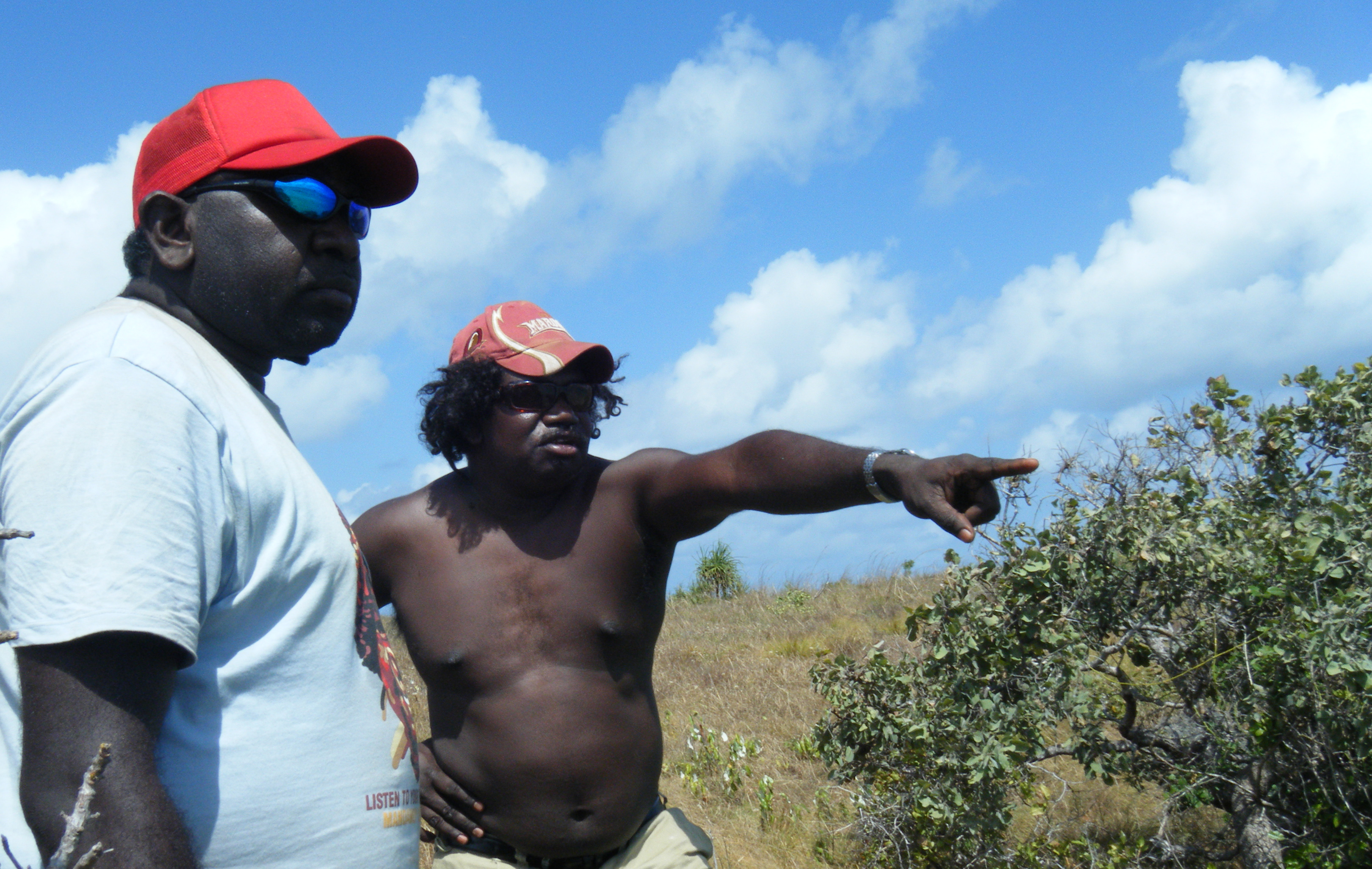
Timmy pointing out fish in Port Bradshaw
