= Arnhem Land =

Coordinates: 12°43′48″S 134°35′24″E

- Region
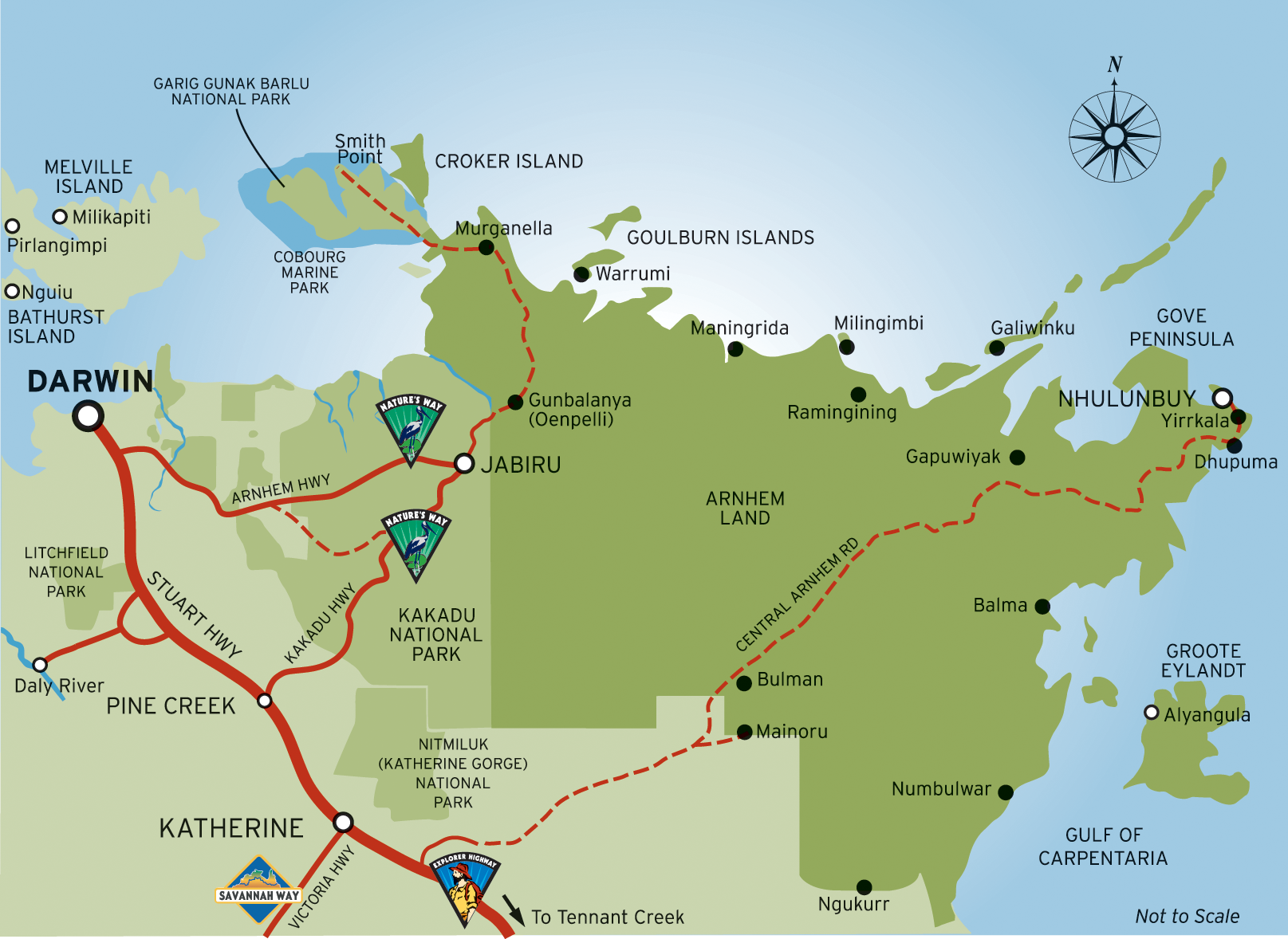
- Country: Australia
- State: Northern Territory

Government
  - Territory electorate: Arafura, Mulka, Arnhem
  - Federal division: Lingiari

Area
  - Total: 97,000 km^{2} (37,000 sq mi)

Arnhem Land is a region of the Northern Territory of Australia. It is located in the north-eastern corner of the territory and is around 500 km (310 mi) from the territorial capital, Darwin. In 1623, Dutch East India Company captain Willem Joosten van Colster (or Coolsteerdt) sailed into the Gulf of Carpentaria and Cape Arnhem is named after his ship, the Arnhem, which itself was named after the city of Arnhem in the Netherlands.

The area covers about 97,000 km^{2} (37,000 sq mi). Two regions are often distinguished as East Arnhem (Land) and West Arnhem (Land). The region's service hub is Nhulunbuy, 600 km (370 mi) east of Darwin, set up in the early 1970s as a mining town for bauxite. Other major population centres are Yirrkala (just outside Nhulunbuy), Gunbalanya (formerly Oenpelli), Ramingining, and Maningrida.

A substantial proportion of the population, who are mostly Aboriginal, live on small outstations or homelands. This outstation movement started in the early 1980s. Many Aboriginal groups moved to usually very small settlements on their traditional lands, often to escape the problems of the larger towns. These population groups have very little Western cultural influence, and Arnhem Land is arguably one of the last areas in Australia that could be seen as a completely separate country. Many of the region's leaders have called and continue to call for a treaty that would allow the Yolŋu people to operate under their own traditional laws.

In 2013–14, the entire region contributed around A$1.3 billion or 7 percent to the Northern Territory's gross state product, mainly through bauxite mining.

In 2019, it was announced that NASA had chosen Arnhem Land as the location for a space launch facility, the Arnhem Space Centre. On 27 June 2022, NASA launched the first rocket there, the first rocket launch from a commercial spaceport outside the US, and two further launches followed within weeks.

== History ==
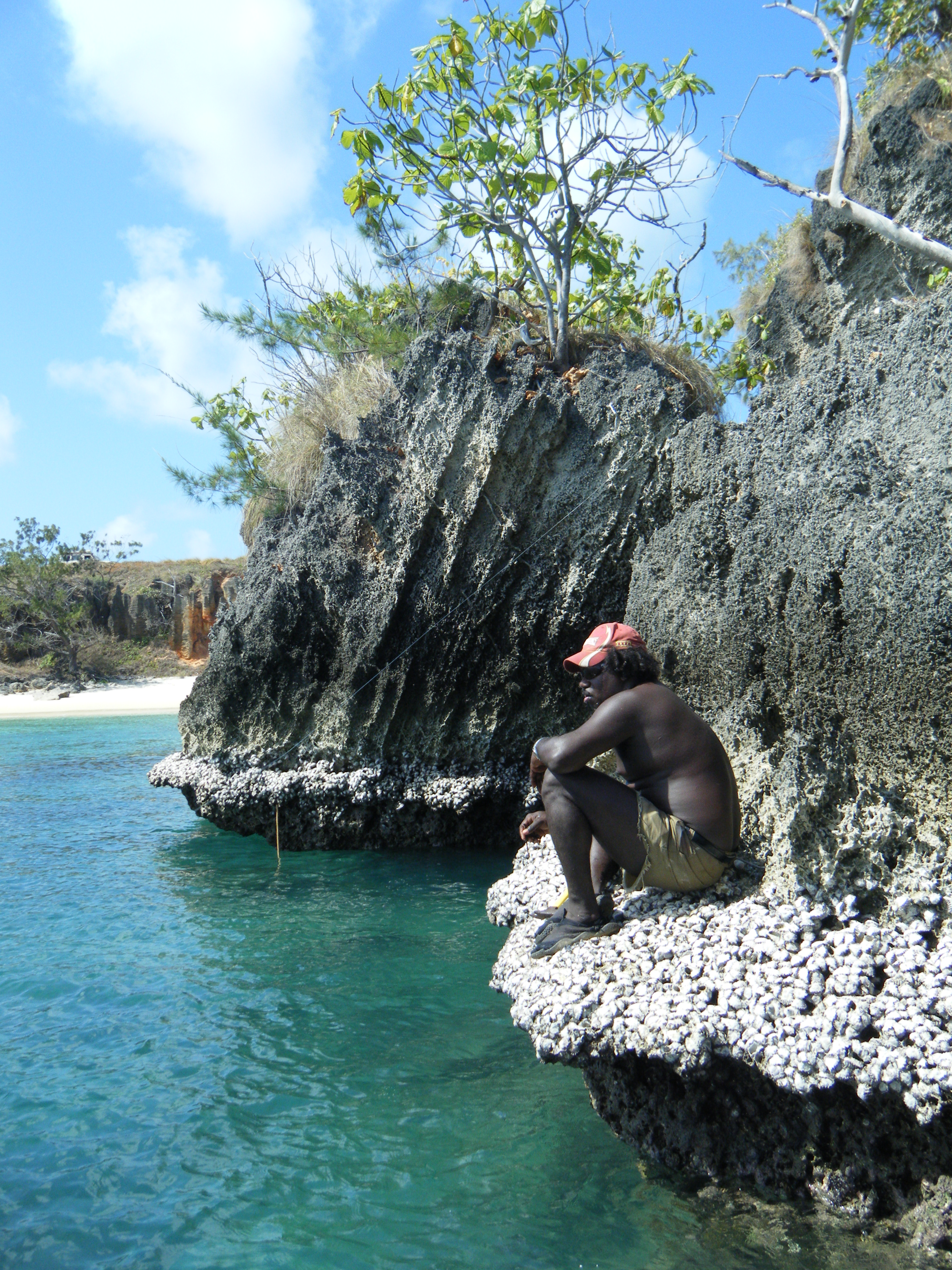
Yolŋu man Timmy Burarrwanga at Bawaka

The Yolŋu culture in East Arnhem Land is possibly one of the oldest living cultures on Earth; humans are known to have inhabited the region for about 60,000 years. DNA studies have confirmed that "Aboriginal Australians are one of the oldest living populations in the world, certainly the oldest outside of Africa"; their descendants left the African continent 75,000 years ago. They may have the oldest continuous culture on earth. Oral histories comprising complex narratives have been passed down through hundreds of generations, and the Aboriginal rock art, dated by modern techniques, shows continuity of their culture.

Arnhem Land is the location of the oldest-known (as of 2010) stone axe of its kind, which scholars believe to be 35,500 years old.

=== Prehistoric warfare ===
Rock art depicting what may be acts of violence between people in Arnhem Land has been tentatively dated to 10,000 years ago.

=== Makassan contact ===
At least since the 18th century (and probably earlier) Muslim traders from Makassar of Sulawesi visited Arnhem Land each year to trade, harvest, and process sea cucumbers or trepang. This marine animal is highly prized in Chinese cuisine, for folk medicine, and as an aphrodisiac.

This Makassan contact with Australia is the first recorded example of interaction between the inhabitants of the Australian continent and their Asian neighbours.

The Makassan name for Arnhem land or the northern Australian coast is Marege', meaning "wild country".

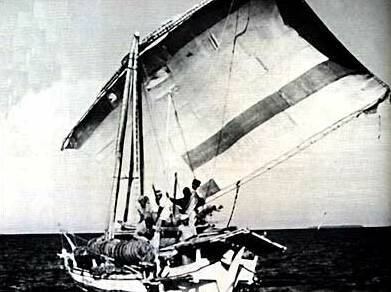
A Makassan wooden sailboat or prau of the type trepangers have used for centuries

This contact had a major effect on local Aboriginal Australians. The Makassans exchanged goods such as cloth, tobacco, knives, rice, and alcohol for the right to trepang coastal waters and employ local labour. Makassar pidgin became a lingua franca along the north coast among several indigenous Australian groups who were brought into greater contact with each other by the seafaring Makassan culture.

These traders from the southwest corner of Sulawesi also introduced the word balanda for white people, long before western explorers set foot on the coasts of northern Australia. In Arnhem Land, the word is still widely used today to refer to white Australians. The Dutch started settling in Sulawesi Island in the early 17th century.

Archaeological remains of Makassar contact, including trepang processing plants (drying, smoking) from the 18th and 19th centuries, are still found at Australian locations such as Port Essington and Groote Eylandt. The Makassans also planted tamarind trees (native to Madagascar and East Africa). After processing, the sea cucumbers were traded by the Makassans to Southern China.

In 2014, an 18th-century Chinese coin was found in the remote area of Wessel Islands off the coast on a beach on Elcho Island during a historical expedition. The coin was found near previously known Makassan trepanger fishing sites where several other Dutch coins have been discovered nearby, but never a Chinese coin. The coin was probably made in Beijing around 1735.

=== Florida Station ===
In 1884, 10,000 square miles of Arnhem Land was sold by the colonial British government to cattle grazier John Arthur Macartney. The property was called Florida Station and Macartney stocked it with cattle overlanded from Queensland. Monsoonal flooding, disease and strong resistance from the local Aboriginal population resulted in Florida Station being abandoned by Macartney in 1893. The first manager of the property, Jim Randell, bolted a swivel cannon to the verandah of the homestead to keep the Indigenous people away, while Jack Watson, the last manager of the property, reportedly "wiped out a lot" of "the blacks" living on the coast at Blue Mud Bay. During the period of Watson's management, another large massacre is recorded to have happened at Mirki on the north coast of Florida Station. The Yolngu people today remember this massacre where many people including children were shot dead.

=== Eastern and African Cold Storage Supply Company ===
From 1903 to 1908, the property rights of much of Arnhem Land were held by the Eastern and African Cold Storage Supply Company. This Anglo-Australian consortium leased the region under the name of Arafura cattle station and attempted to construct a massive cattle raising and meat production industry. The company employed roving gangs of armed men to shoot the resident Aboriginal population.

=== Gove land rights case ===
After exploration for bauxite commenced near Yirrkala mission on the Gove Peninsula without consulting the local people, the Yirrkala bark petitions were created and presented to federal parliament in 1963. In 1971, the Gove land rights case (Milirrpum v Nabalco Pty Ltd) was the first litigation on native title in Australia, and the first significant legal case for Aboriginal land rights in Australia. The ruling was upheld by the High Court on 12 March 2025, where parties are entitled to a fair compensation of at most AUD700 million.

== Geography ==
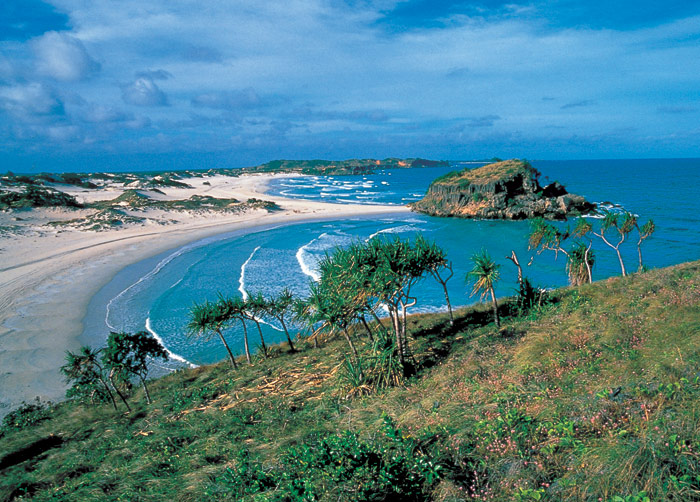
Nanydjaka Cape Arnhem Coast

The area is from Port Roper on the Gulf of Carpentaria around the coast to the East Alligator River, where it adjoins Kakadu National Park. The major centres are Jabiru on the Kakadu National Park border, Maningrida at the Liverpool River mouth, and Nhulunbuy (also known as Gove) in the far north-east, on the Gove Peninsula. Gove is the site of large-scale bauxite mining with an associated alumina refinery. Its administrative centre is the town of Nhulunbuy, the fourth-largest population centre in the Northern Territory.

The climate of Arnhem Land is tropical monsoon with a wet and dry season. The temperature has little seasonal variation; however, it can range from overnight lows of 15 °C (59 °F) in the dry season (April to September) to daily highs of 33 °C (91 °F) in the wet season (October to March).

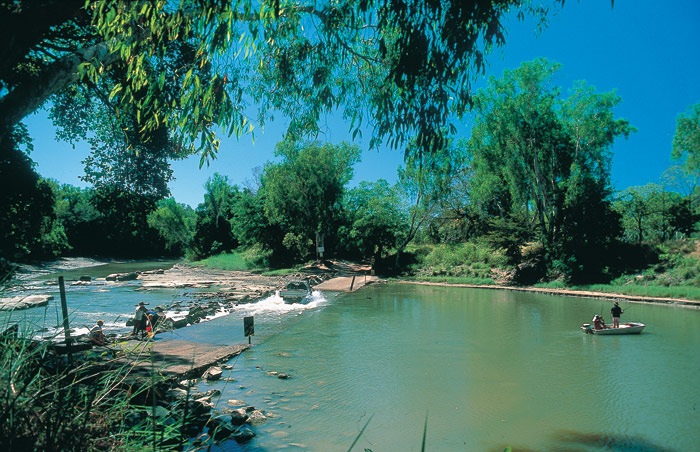
East Alligator River Crossing (Cahills Crossing)

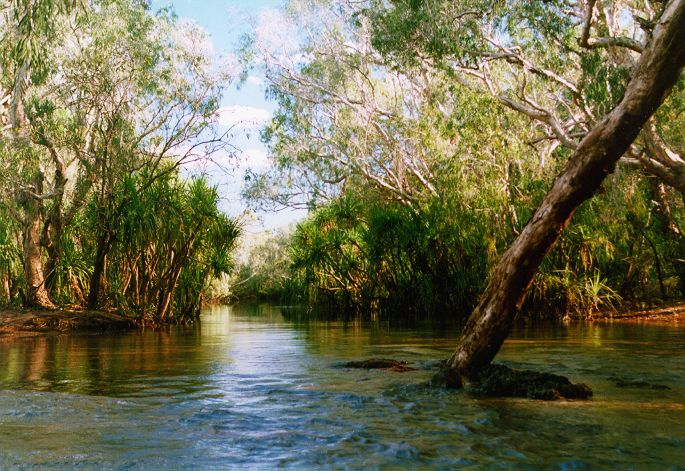
Goyder River Crossing, Central Arnhem Highway

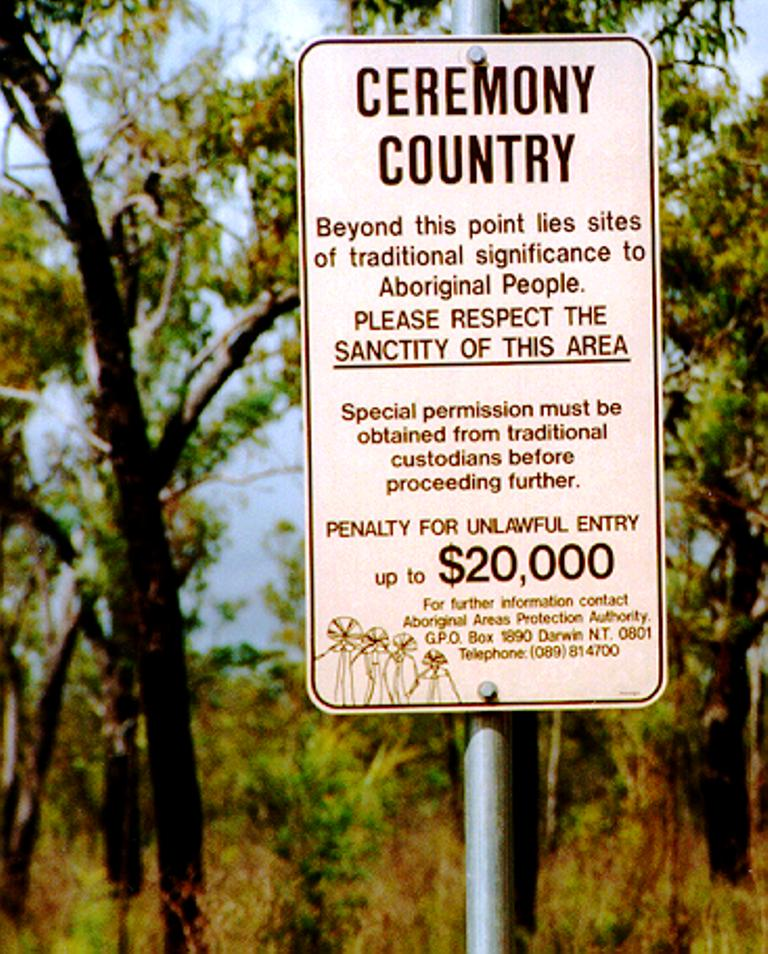
Some areas of deep cultural significance to the Indigenous inhabitants are off-limits even to those with permission to travel across Arnhem Land.

== Governance and demographics ==
=== Indigenous land ===
Various Aboriginal peoples lived across the continent before the colonisation of Australia, including various tribes across the Northern Territory before its colonisation. Yolngu peoples lived in Arnhem Land for centuries, first encountering outsiders when they traded with Macassans.

In 1931, an area of 96,000 km^{2} (37,000 sq mi) was proclaimed as an Aboriginal reserve, named Arnhem Land Aboriginal Reserve. As of 2007 the Land Trust held about 100,000 km^{2} (39,000 sq mi) as Aboriginal freehold land (with the exception of mining leases).

Arnhem Land is composed of many different Aboriginal countries and language groups. North-east Arnhem Land is home to the Yolngu people, one of the largest Indigenous groups in Australia, who have succeeded in maintaining a vigorous traditional culture, and whose name for this area is Miwatj. The term Yolngu simply means "person", but has come to mean the group of intermarrying clans who live in this part of Arnhem Land, and whose members speak mainly one of many Yolŋu languages, or Yolngu Matha. The North East Arnhem Land Aboriginal Corporation (NEAL) is made up of 26 elder-leaders (dilak), representing the 26 clans (bäpurru) of North East Arnhem Land who have sovereignty over certain areas of land and waters. Kinship ties, territorial claims, and other social issues are managed by the clan system.

In West Arnhem Land, large groups include the Bininj people and the Maung people of the Goulburn Islands.

=== State, federal, and local governments ===
There are three electoral districts within Arnhem land for the purpose of electing members of the Northern Territory Government. These are Arafura, Mulka, and Arnhem. For federal government, Arnhem Land lies within the Division of Lingiari.

East Arnhem Regional Council services six remote communities in East Arnhem Land: Galiwin'ku (Elcho Island), Gapuwiyak, Ramingining, Yirrkala, Milingimbi Island, and Gunyangara.

In the 2021 census, 6,281 people were living in West Arnhem, of whom around 81 per cent are Aboriginal. The West Arnhem Regional Council covers an area of just under 50,000 km^{2} (19,000 sq mi), which includes five remote communities or wards: Jabiru, Gunbalanya, Maningrida, Warruwi (on South Goulburn Island), and Minjilang, as well as two islands and over 100 homelands.

== Economy ==
In 2013–14, the entire region contributed around A$1.3 billion or 7% to the Northern Territory's gross state product, mainly through bauxite mining.

In 2019, it was announced that NASA had chosen Arnhem Land as the location for a space launch facility. The Arnhem Space Centre was built near Nhulunbuy, employing mostly local labour, and on 27 June 2022, NASA launched the first rocket there, which was the first rocket launch from a commercial spaceport outside the US. Two further launches followed, the third on 11 July. The facility ceased operations in 2024.

== Film ==
The 2006 film Ten Canoes captures life in Arnhem Land through a story tapping into the Aboriginal mythic past; it was co-directed by one of the indigenous cast members. The film and the documentary about the making of the film, The Balanda and the Bark Canoes, give a remarkable testimony to the indigenous struggle to keep their culture alive – or rather revive it in the wake of considerable relative modernisation and influence of white (balanda) cultural imposition.

High Ground (2020 film), a 2020 feature film directed by Stephen Maxwell Johnson, based on historical fact and reflecting the history and culture of the Yolngu people, was filmed in Arnhem land.

== Art ==
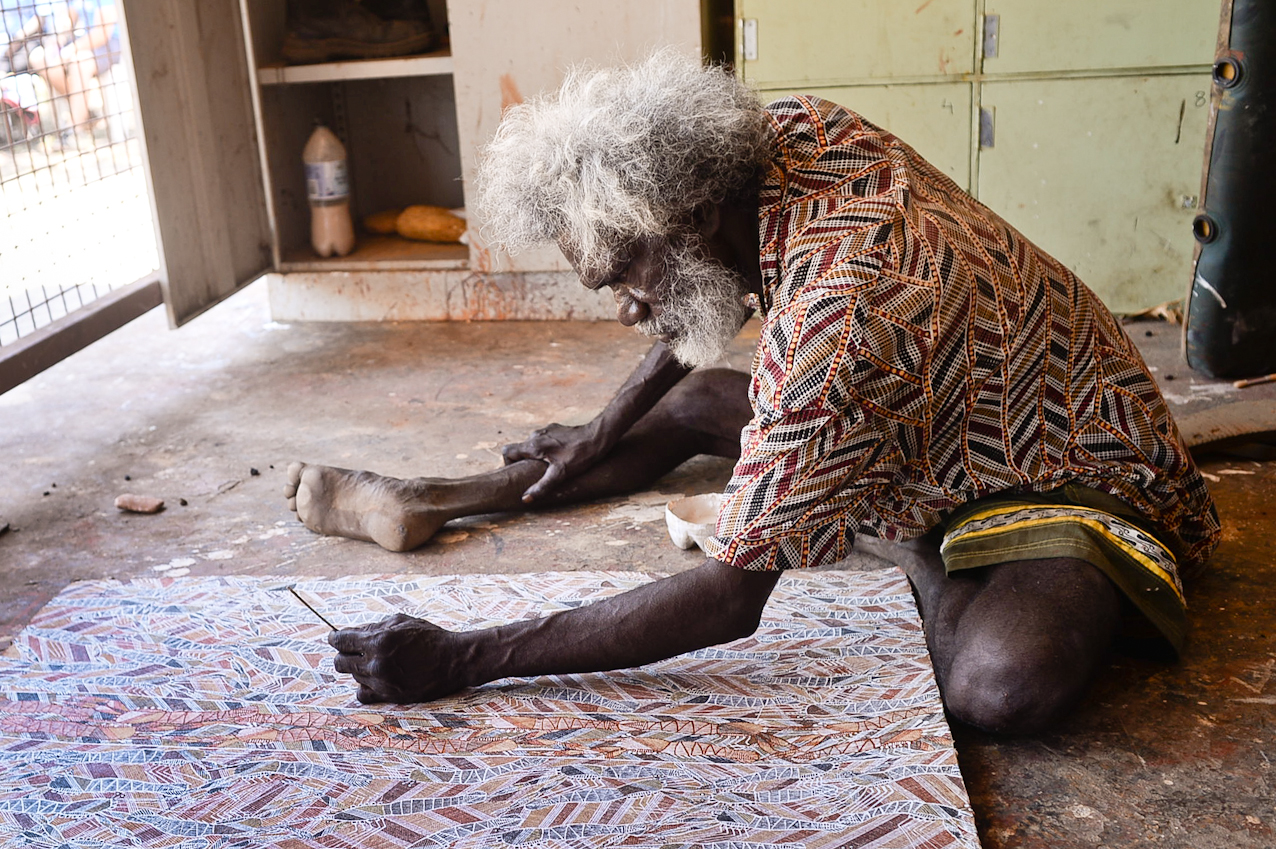
Glen Namundja, an Australian Aboriginal artist from Arnhem Land, at work

The Aboriginal community of Yirrkala, just outside Nhulunbuy, is internationally known for bark paintings, promoting the rights of Indigenous Australians, and as the origin of the yidaki, or didgeridoo. The community of Gunbalanya (previously known as Oenpelli) in Western Arnhem Land is also notable for bark painting. The indigenous inhabitants also create temporary sand sculptures as part of their sacred rituals.

Arnhem Land is also notable for Aboriginal rock art, some examples of which can be found at Ubirr Rock, Injalak Hill, and in the Canon Hill area. Some of these record the early years of European explorers and settlers, sometimes in such detail that Martini–Henry rifles can be identified. They also depict axes, and detailed paintings of aircraft and ships. One remote shelter, several hundred kilometres from Darwin, has a painting of the wharf at Darwin, including building and boats, and Europeans with hats and pipes, some apparently without hands (which they have in their trouser pockets). Near the East Alligator River crossing, a figure was painted of a man carrying a gun and wearing his hair in long pigtails down his back, characteristic of the Chinese labourers brought to Darwin in the late 19th century.

One Yolngu prehistoric stone arrangement at Macassans Beach near Yirrkala shows the layout of the Makassan praus used for trepang (sea cucumber) fishing in the area. This was a legacy of Yolngu trade links with the people on the Indonesian island of Sulawesi. The trading relationship antedated European settlement by some 200 years.

Aboriginal artists in Arnhem Land are primarily represented by Aboriginal Art Centres, nonprofit, community-owned organisations. In East Arnhem Land, primarily Yolngu Matha-speaking artists are promoted by Buku-Larrnggay Mulka in Yirrkala, Bula'bula Arts in Ramingining, Elcho Island Arts and Crafts on Elcho Island, Gapuwiyak Culture and Arts in Gapuwiyak and Milingimbi Art and Culture on Milingimbi Island. In Central Arnhem Land, Maningrida Arts & Culture in Maningrida promotes the work of a diverse range of Kuninjku, Burarra, and Gurrgoni artists, amongst others. In West Arnhem Land, Injalak Arts in Gunbalanya represents mainly Kunwinjku artists. Ngukurr Arts is located on the Roper River in Southern Arnhem Land. Art is also produced on the many islands of Arnhem Land, and there are art centres on the Anindilyakwa speaking Groote Eylandt (Anindilyakwa Art) and the Maung speaking Goulburn Islands (Mardbalk Arts & Crafts).

== Homelands ==
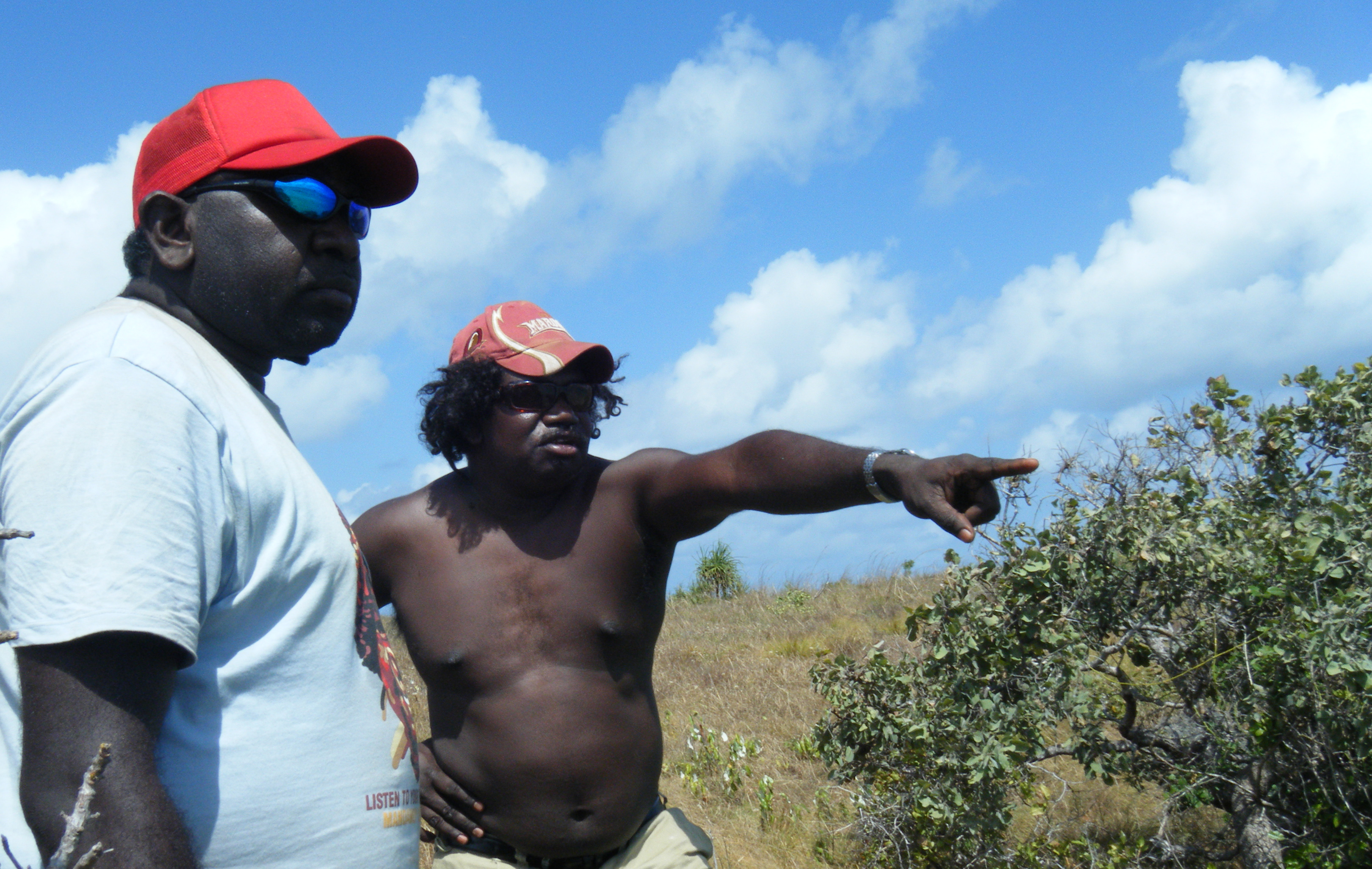
Timmy 'Djawa' Burarrwanga pointing out fish in Yalangbara

Arnhem Land is also known for embracing the homeland movement, sometimes referred to as the outstation movement. For many decades prior to 1970, the East Arnhem Land Yolngu people lived on mission stations, such as Yirrkala. From April 1972, Yolngu families began moving away, back to their traditional clan lands. This was instigated by Yolngu people, before there was government support for the outstation movement. The people cleared land for airstrips and built their own houses from local timber, with the help of non-Indigenous people from the mission. The elders of the clans aimed to determine their own futures, basing their societies on Yolngu law, while living and raising their children on their lands in a sustainable and self-sufficient way. In 1985, Laynhapuy Homelands Aboriginal Corporation (LHAC), an Aboriginal corporation, was established to assist the homelands.

Homelands are tiny communities where members of related clan groups live on their traditional land, living according to Yolngu rom (law). There are benefits to the people to be living in these homelands, including:

- Homelands people have a strong connection to their land, and maintain their traditional language and cultural values. They choose to live on their traditional land to maintain this strong spiritual connection, social wellbeing, and to provide a positive future for their children and their families by staying away from widespread problems in large communities.
- By living on their traditional land, homelands people retain a degree of autonomy. They are empowered to manage their own land, resources and affairs.
- They have the power to make decisions affecting their lives, and reduce their dependence on government.

Homelands also reduce pressure on other Indigenous communities, which are already suffering from problems in the housing, health and education services areas.

In the early 21st century, a focus from governments about the "viability" of the homelands has caused tensions and uncertainty within the Arnhem Land community.

In September 2008, then Darwin correspondent for The Age, Lindsay Murdoch, wrote: "Elders tell of their fears that Yolngu culture and society will not survive if clans cannot continue to live on and access their land through homelands. They warn that if services are cut, many of the 800 people in the Laynhapuy homelands will be forced to move to towns such as Yirrkala on the Gove Peninsula, creating new law and order problems, while those who stay will be severely disadvantaged."

In response to changes made by the Northern Territory government surrounding reduced support for the homelands in 2009, the Indigenous leader Patrick Dodson criticised the Northern Territory Government's controversial new policy on remote Aboriginal communities, describing it as a "die on the vine" plan that will "slowly but surely" kill indigenous culture.

Born in the 1930s, Dr. Gawirrin Gumana AO was a leader of the Dhalwangu clan, renowned for his artwork and knowledge of traditional culture and law. In May 2009, he had the following to say about the significance of the homelands to his people:

"We want to stay on our own land. We have our culture, we have our law, we have our land rights, we have our painting and carving, we have our stories from our old people, not only my people, but everyone, all Dhuwa and Yirritja, we are not making this up.
I want you to listen to me Government.
I know you have got the money to help our Homelands. But you also know there is money to be made from Aboriginal land.
You should trust me, and you should help us to live here, on our land, for my people.
I am talking for all Yolŋu now.
So if you can't trust me Government, if you can't help me Government, come and shoot me, because I will die here before I let this happen."

Despite facing government concerns and policy confusion, a number of people have developed commercial enterprises that have centred on using the best elements of their homelands. Indigenous tourism ventures incorporating the controlled use of homelands are now showing signs of success for a select number of Yolngu.

=== Communities ===
- Gan Gan, aka Gangan, is a remote inland riverside community, in the traditional lands of the Dhalwaŋu people. There are several well-known artists in the community, notably Malaluba Gumana, Nongirrnga Marawili, Gawarrin Gumana and Garawan Wanambi. Gan Gan is also the site of an event known as the Gan Gan massacre that occurred in 1911, when over 30 men, women and children were killed by colonial police and settlers.
- Cannon Hill – family outstation

== See also ==
- Arnhem Land tropical savanna
- Regions of Australia
- Gabarnmung – Aboriginal archaeological and rock art site
- Kakadu National Park
  - Flora of Kakadu National Park
- Protected areas of the Northern Territory
- Ubirr
- Wongalara Sanctuary
