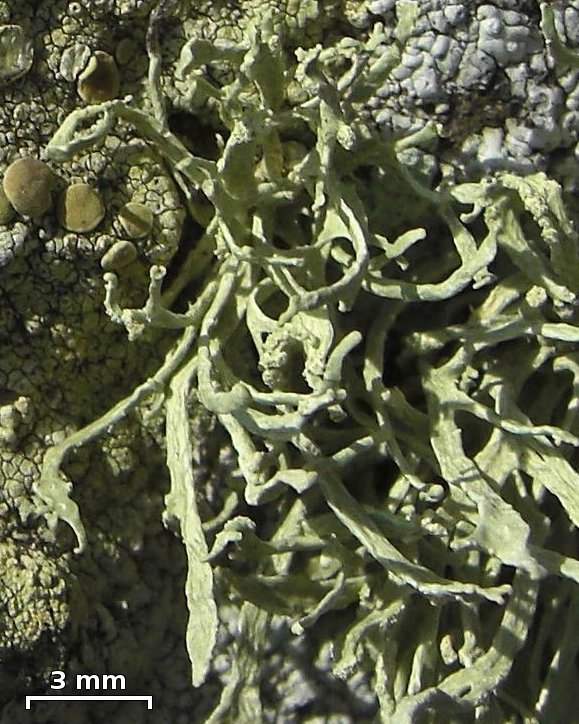
- Growing on basalt, South Plaza Island

Scientific classification
- Kingdom: Fungi
- Division: Ascomycota
- Class: Lecanoromycetes
- Order: Lecanorales
- Family: Ramalinaceae
- Genus: Ramalina
- Species: R. polyforma

Binomial name
- Ramalina polyforma Aptroot (2007)

= Ramalina polyforma =

Species of lichen-forming fungus

Ramalina polyforma is a species of saxicolous (rock-dwelling), fruticose lichen in the family Ramalinaceae. This greenish-grey shrubby lichen, endemic to the Galápagos Islands, was formally described as a new species in 2007 by Dutch lichenologist André Aptroot.

== Taxonomy ==
Ramalina polyforma was first identified and described in 2007 by Dutch lichenologist André Aptroot. The species epithet, polyforma, reflects the variable physical structure of this species, aptly capturing its morphological diversity. The type specimen for this species was collected by the author on the coastal lava cliffs east of Puerto Ayora near the Charles Darwin Research Station in the Galápagos Islands.

== Description ==
Characterised by its highly variable branching pattern, Ramalina polyforma is generally shrubby with a dull appearance, its greenish-grey thallus reaching diameters up to 3 cm (1.2 in). The branching pattern can range from few, stout, and broadly flattened branches reminiscent of antlers with curled tips, to densely ramified, irregularly angular branches. These branches tend to become rounder at their tips and occasionally display curled ends, resembling hooks.

The surface of this lichen is irregularly striate and wrinkled due to the cartilaginous cortical strands. The yellowish soredia, capitate or irregular in form, usually appear terminal and can reach diameters of approximately 1 mm.

Neither apothecia nor pycnidia have been observed to occur in this species. The medulla reacts to a K spot test by turning orange-yellow and then red, and emits a white glow under UV light. The presence of salazinic acid, sekikaic acid, and divaricatic acids is a distinctive chemical characteristic of the species, along with the presence of usnic acid in the cortex.

== Habitat and distribution ==
Ramalina polyforma inhabits the rocky landscapes of the Galápagos Islands and is commonly found across all vegetation zones, particularly on rocks with moderate exposure to sheltered conditions. This lichen is especially prevalent along coastal areas, throughout the arid zone, and the lower transition zone. It is notably the most commonly found saxicolous Ramalina on the Galapagos and often serves as the dominant species in its habitats; more than a dozen species of Ramalina have been recorded from the islands. At the time of its publication, only a single specimen of Ramalina polyforma had been documented from higher altitudes.

== See also ==
- List of Ramalina species
