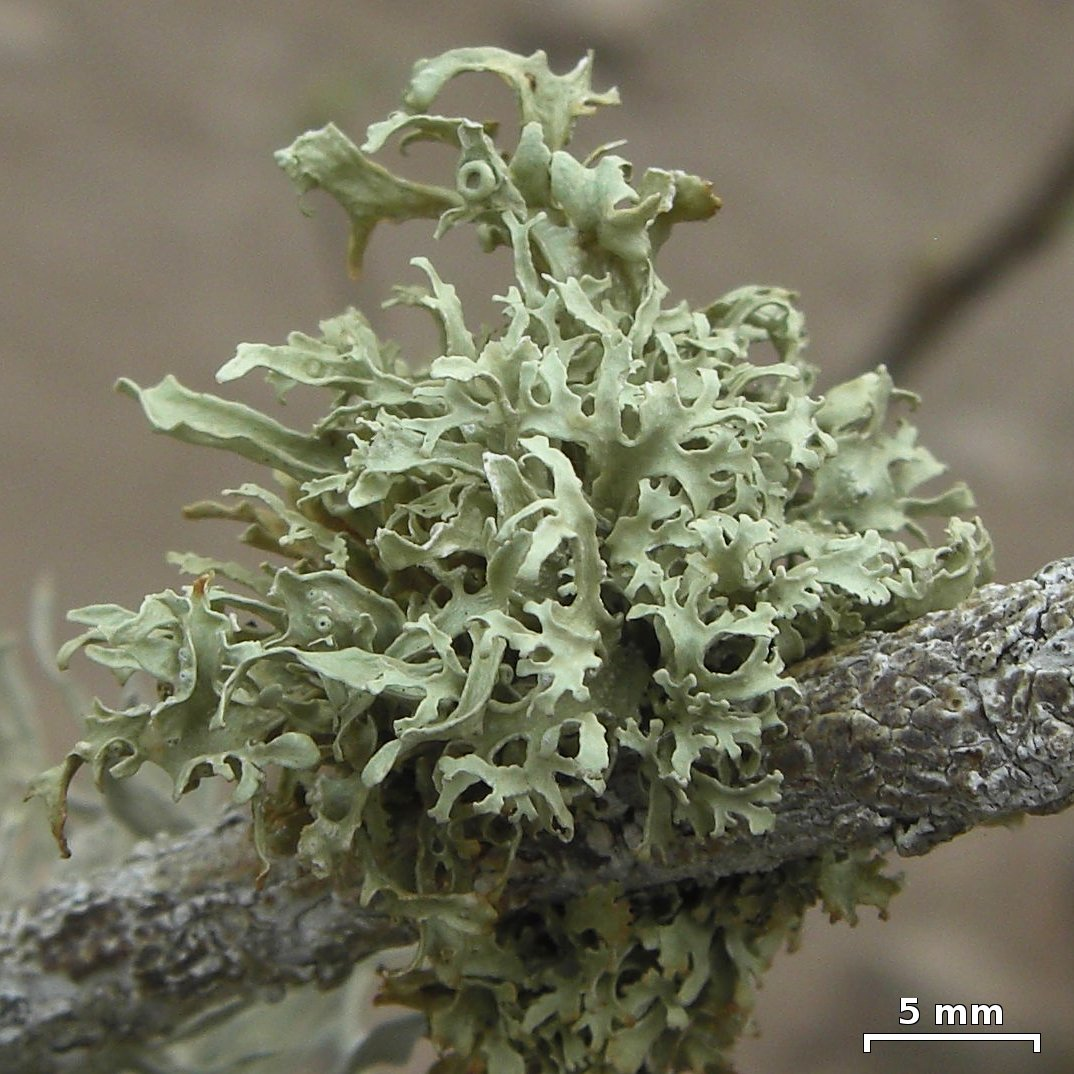

Scientific classification
- Kingdom: Fungi
- Division: Ascomycota
- Class: Lecanoromycetes
- Order: Lecanorales
- Family: Ramalinaceae
- Genus: Ramalina
- Species: R. darwiniana

Binomial name
- Ramalina darwiniana Aptroot & Bungartz (2007)
- Holotype: South Plaza Island, Galápagos Islands

= Ramalina darwiniana =

Species of lichen-forming fungus

Ramalina darwiniana is a species of strap lichen in the family Ramalinaceae. Found only in the Galápagos Islands, it was first described in 2007 and named in honour of Charles Darwin's work on the archipelago's biodiversity. This shrub-like lichen grows up to 15 centimetres wide and is typically found on tree bark or wood in coastal and arid areas of the islands. It is characterised by its greenish-grey colour, grooved branches that often curl at the tips, and the occasional presence of small holes where branches fuse together. R. darwiniana reproduces through cup-shaped structures called apothecia and can be identified by its chemical reaction to potassium hydroxide solution (a standard chemical spot test), which turns its inner layer orange-yellow then red. The species is well-adapted to the harsh, dry conditions of its native habitat and is often abundant where it grows.

== Taxonomy ==
Ramalina darwiniana was formally described as a new species in 2007 by the lichenologists André Aptroot and Frank Bungartz. The type specimen (holotype) was collected by Aptroot on 21 February 2006 on the eastern part of South Plaza Island in the Galapagos. It was found at sea level in the coastal zone, growing on a wood twig. The species epithet, darwiniana, honours Charles Darwin, recognising his contributions to the study of biodiversity in the Galápagos Archipelago.

The species was discovered during fieldwork conducted between 2005 and 2007, which focused on the lichens of the Galápagos Islands. This study resulted in the collection and analysis of numerous Ramalina specimens from various habitats, particularly in coastal zones. R. darwiniana is closely related to other species within Ramalina that exhibit similar growth forms and chemical characteristics, but its distinct morphology and habitat preferences helped classify it as a new species.

The authors also described a variety of R. darwiniana, named Ramalina darwiniana var. curvida. This variety is distinguished from the typical form by its narrower lobes, which are more deeply and strongly grooved (canaliculate). The lobes of var. curvida typically measure up to 3 mm in diameter, compared to the broader lobes of the typical variety. This morphological distinction can often be observed in the field, where the two varieties may grow side by side.

== Description ==
Ramalina darwiniana has a shrubby, greenish-grey thallus that can grow up to 15 cm in diameter, although most individuals are typically smaller, ranging between 3 and 7 cm. Its branches start off erect but become pendulous as the lichen ages. These branches are distinctly grooved and can vary from broadly crescent-shaped to somewhat flattened in cross-section. In some cases, the branches curve along their length, with their tips curling backward in a characteristic "shepherd's crook" appearance.

The margins of the lobes are adorned with irregular warts, from which small, dot-like structures called pseudocyphellae may develop. Unlike some other Ramalina species, R. darwiniana lacks soralia (specialised structures that produce powdery reproductive propagules). The species is known for its distinctive lobes, which can occasionally fuse (anastomose), forming small, oval holes within the thallus.

Apothecia (fruiting bodies) are quite common in this species. These structures measure between 2 and 7 mm in diameter and are often cup-shaped, located either along the edges or at the ends of the branches. The apothecia are generally pinkish-grey to yellowish in colour. The ascospores, produced within the apothecia, are elongated and slightly curved, measuring around 10–12 by 4–5 μm. In addition to apothecia, R. darwiniana has small, spherical pycnidia (structures that produce asexual spores), which are found along the margins of the branches.

In terms of chemical properties, the medulla (inner layer) of the lichen reacts positively to potassium hydroxide solution (K+), turning orange-yellow and then red, indicating the presence of salazinic acid. Usnic acid, a compound common in many lichens, is present in the cortex (outer layer), and some specimens also contain atranorin.

== Habitat and distribution ==
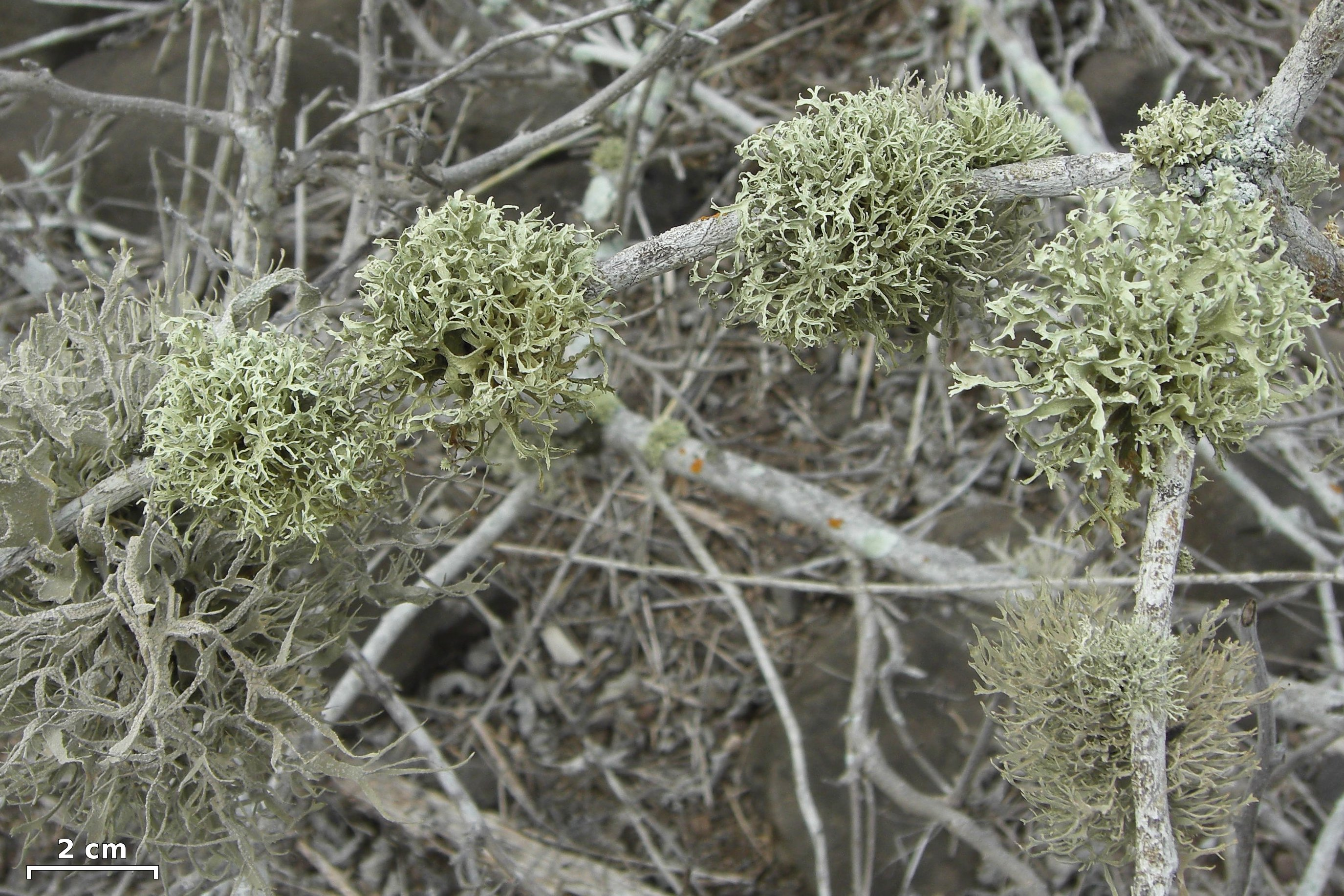
Growing on branches on Fondeadero, Santa Fe Island

Ramalina darwiniana is endemic to the Galápagos Islands, where it is found primarily in the coastal and arid zones. It typically grows on the bark and twigs of shrubs and trees, particularly in dry forests and open shrublands that are characteristic of the scrubland mosaic ecosystem. The lichen is corticolous (growing on bark) or lignicolous (growing on wood), though it has occasionally been observed on rocks (saxicolous) in some areas.

The species thrives in exposed, sunny environments, often subjected to wind and rain. It can be found at low elevations, typically between 1 and 250 metres above sea level, across various islands, including Santa Cruz, Santiago, Isabela, and Española. Common host trees for R. darwiniana include Bursera graveolens, Castela galapageia, and Acacia rorudiana. R. darwiniana is well adapted to the harsh conditions of the Galápagos, particularly in areas with sparse vegetation, basalt outcrops, and dry conditions. It is often abundant in these habitats, covering twigs and branches in areas where other lichen species are also found.

== See also ==
- List of Ramalina species
- List of things named after Charles Darwin
