= Charles Darwin National Park =

National park in Australia

- IUCN category II (national park)
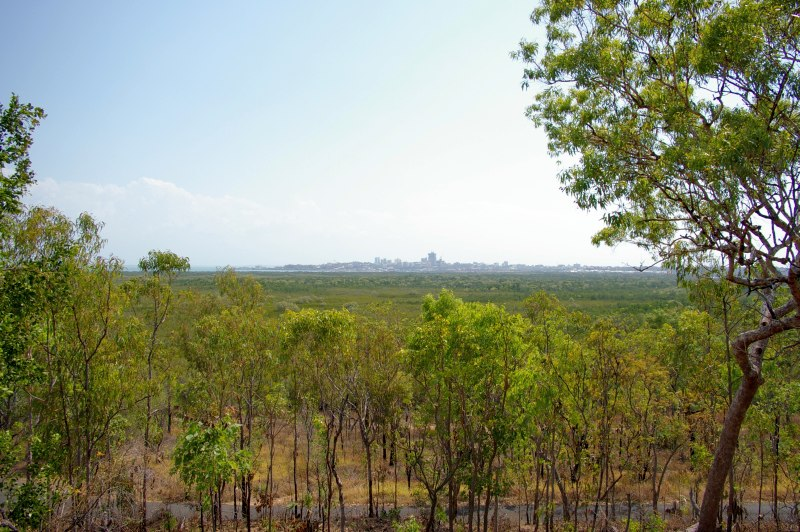
- Looking at Darwin from a park lookout

- Location within Northern Territory
- Location: Northern Territory
- Nearest city: Darwin
- Coordinates: 12°27′03″S 130°52′24″E
- Area: 13.03 km^{2} (5.03 sq mi)
- Established: 8 April 1998
- Governing body: Parks and Wildlife Commission of the Northern Territory; Aboriginal traditional land owners
- Website: https://nt.gov.au/leisure/parks-reserves/find-a-park-to-visit/charles-darwin-national-park

Charles Darwin National Park is a national park in the Northern Territory of Australia, 4 km southeast of Darwin. It is notable for its World War II–era concrete bunkers, one of which has been converted into a visitors centre and display of World War II memorabilia. It also has lookouts towards the city of Darwin. It contains middens used by the Larrakia people.

The park has extensive fire trails suitable for bush walking, as well as a mountain bike trail maintained by the Darwin Off-Road Cyclists Club. Regular events held in the park include the Earthdance festival.

== See also ==
- Protected areas of the Northern Territory
