= Darwin Sound (Canada) =

Sound in British Columbia, Canada

Coordinates: 52°40′00″N 131°43′00″W

Darwin Sound is a sound in the Queen Charlotte Islands of British Columbia, Canada. It is located between Moresby Island (W) and Lyell Island (E) and was named in 1878 by Canada's chief geographer George M. Dawson in honour of Charles Darwin, the eminent naturalist.
