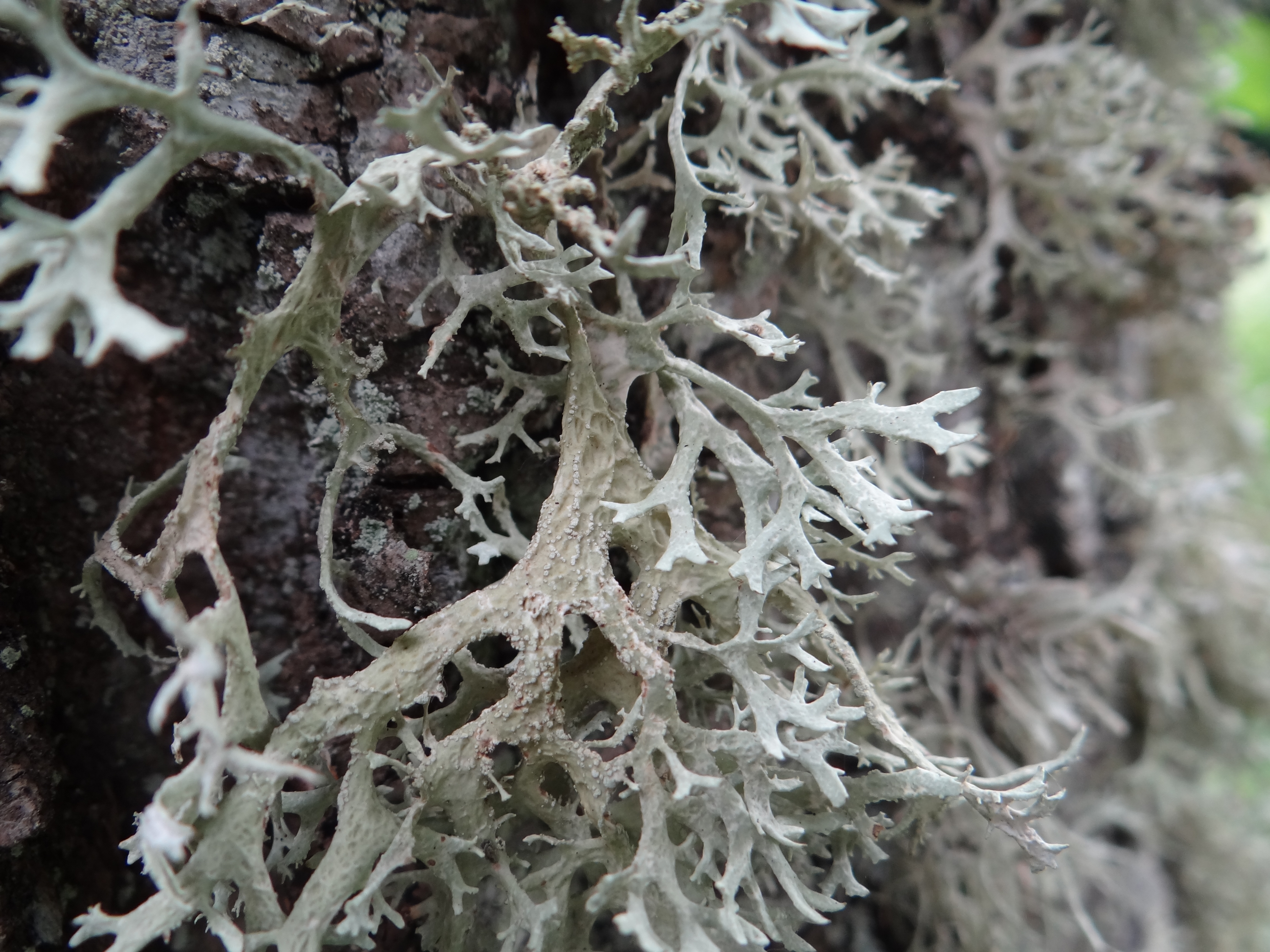
- Growing on tree bark

Scientific classification
- Kingdom: Fungi
- Division: Ascomycota
- Class: Lecanoromycetes
- Order: Lecanorales
- Family: Ramalinaceae
- Genus: Ramalina
- Species: R. pollinaria

Binomial name
- Ramalina pollinaria (Westr.) Ach. (1810)

Synonyms
- List: Lichen pollinarius Westr. (1795); Parmelia pollinaria (Westr.) Ach. (1803); Ramalina fraxinea var. pollinaria (Westr.) Fürnr. (1839); Ramalina pollinaria [unranked] lenormandii De Not. (1846); Ramalina pollinaria var. humilis Ach. (1810); Lichen squarrosus * humilis (Ach.) Lam. (1813); Ramalina humilis (Ach.) Röhl. (1813); Ramalina polymorpha var. humilis (Ach.) A.Massal. (1853); Ramalina pollinaria f. humilis (Ach.) Anders (1928); Ramalina squarrosa f. humilis (Ach.) Oxner (1937)

= Ramalina pollinaria =

Species of lichen-fungus

Ramalina pollinaria is a Eurasian, rock- and bark-dwelling fruticose lichen in the family Ramalinaceae. This lichen forms pale green to yellowish branching structures that grow 1–5 cm long and produce powdery reproductive particles called soredia. It was originally discovered in Sweden in 1795 and was noted by early botanists as valuable for producing dyes, yielding light-green colours on silk and brown shades on wool. The species grows on both tree bark and rocks across Europe and Asia, though it is not particularly common in any location. Recent molecular phylogenetics studies have helped scientists separate this European species from similar-looking lichens found in East Asia and North America.

== Taxonomy ==
The species was first described in 1795 by the Swedish botanist Johan Peter Westring, who called it Lichen pollinarius. Westring recorded it from many places, particularly in the south of Sweden on rocks and old walls, and remarked that although it mostly resembles L. calicaris (now Ramalina calicaris) it differs in its nature and has its own specific marks. He considered it in some respects intermediate between L. prunastri (now Evernia prunastri) and L. calicaris, but distinct from both in colour. He also remarked on its value as a dyestuff, noting that it yields a firm light-green on silk and brown shades on wool after prolonged digestion, and that it grew commonly enough to be worth gathering for dye use.

Erik Acharius reclassified the species in the genus Ramalina in 1810. His fuller 1810 treatment set out a sharper diagnosis: the soredia spread from the lobe margins and sides so that much of the surface becomes powdery, and the apothecia sit near the lobe tips, somewhat sessile, shallowly concave at first and later broadly expanded with a raised margin. Acharius separated the species from the lookalikes Ramalina farinacea, R. fraxinea and R. fastigiata on that combination of soralial development, apothecial form and broader, flatter lobes. He also recognised infraspecific variation, formalising a low, narrow-lobed variety as var. humilis. The epithet pollinaria (Latin, 'powdery') refers to the conspicuous powdery soredia noted by both Westring and Acharius.

In 1977, Krog and James designated a neotype (a replacement reference specimen) for the species (H-ACH 1831D), but this specimen does not match Ramalina pollinaria in the strict sense. To stabilise the application of the name, Gasparyan, Sipman, and Lücking (2017) chose a new neotype from Acharius's herbarium sheet held at the BM (BM 001107258, specimen 6), together with an epitype (an interpretive companion specimen) from Sweden backed by an ITS barcode. In the same publication they designated a lectotype (a specimen selected from original material to serve as the definitive type) for var. elatior as R. pollinaria s.str., and reassigned the former Krog and James neotype as the lectotype of var. humilis. Before later reassessment of the complex, Hiroyuki Kashiwadani and co-authors treated Ramalina pseudosekika Asahina as a synonym of R. pollinaria and regarded R. pollinaria as widely distributed in China, citing representative collections from Hebei, Heilongjiang, Jilin, Liaoning and Shandong.

An integrative reassessment of the Ramalina pollinaria group based on morphology, chemistry and internal transcribed spacer (ITS) sequences showed that East Asian material traditionally included under R. pollinaria belongs to two distinct species, R. yasudae and R. sekika. The ITS-derived phylogenetic tree placed R. yasudae and R. sekika together in a well-supported clade, with R. pollinaria outside that lineage, and the authors retained R. sekika and R. yasudae as separate species owing to consistent differences in soredium size, chemistry, distribution and ecology. The study examined about forty herbarium specimens and generated and analysed ITS rDNA data. Most North American records previously assigned to R. pollinaria were found to belong to R. labiosorediata.

== Description ==
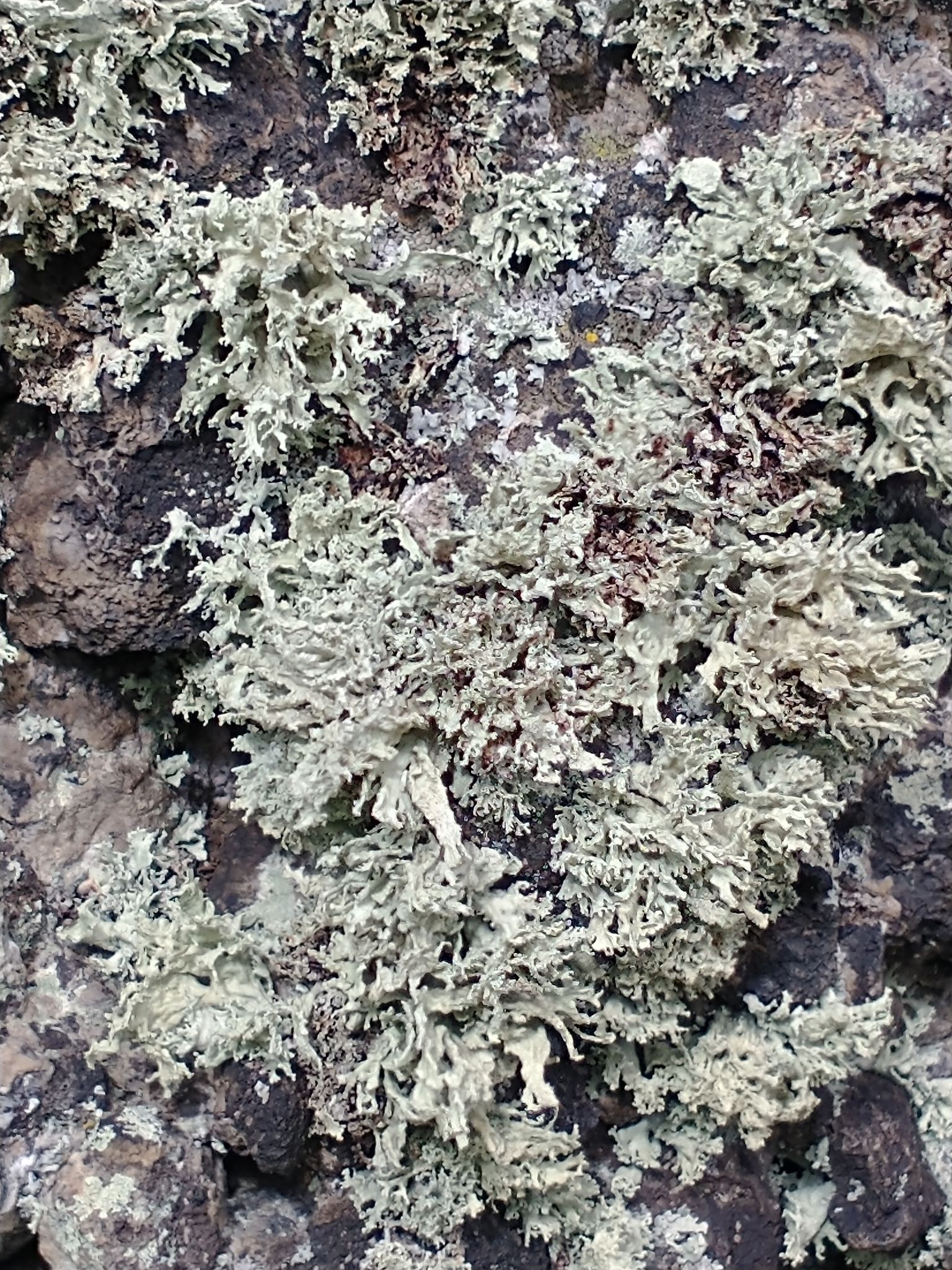
Growing on bark near Burg-Reuland, Belgium

Ramalina pollinaria has a thallus that is pale green to pale yellow, with lengths ranging from 1–2 cm, occasionally reaching up to 5 cm. The thallus is composed of discrete lobes or forms dense mats. Its lobes are flattened and measure about 3 mm broad at the base, quickly branching into numerous finer branches. These branches can be partially terete, measuring 1–2 mm in diameter, or more flattened with undulating, deeply incised, or notched margins. The surface of the lichen is smooth and shiny, giving it a cartilaginous appearance. Internally, the medulla is dense and not hollow, with a cartilaginous subcortex.

The lichen's soralia are mostly found near the tips of the branches but can sometimes appear along the edges or surfaces of the branches. These structures originate from degenerating regions of the cortex, initially presenting as excavated soralia that irregularly spread and often resemble lips at the branch apices. Soredia are fine and measure 30–45 μm in diameter. Apothecia (fruiting bodies) have not been observed in this species.

The medulla and soralia show negative reactions to chemical spot tests (C−, K−, KC−, Pd−). However, under ultraviolet light, they may show a faint blue-white or pale violet-grey fluorescence. This lichen contains usnic acid as its primary secondary metabolite (lichen product), sometimes accompanied by an evernic acid complex. In the East Asian lookalikes, R. sekika is chemically distinct by sekikaic-series compounds (often with salazinic acid), whereas R. pollinaria/R. yasudae lack sekikaic acid; the authors noted no evidence of mixed evernic acid and sekikaic acid strains within a single species. Gasparyan and co-authors did not confirm earlier reports of obtusatic acid in R. pollinaria s.str.

=== Similar species ===
Several species closely related to Ramalina pollinaria have been segregated from it in recent decades. Ramalina europaea, widespread in Europe, is distinguished by small, spine-like branchlets with punctiform soralia; Ramalina labiosorediata, found in North America, has terminal, labriform soralia originating from the underside of lobes. A phylogenetic analysis using ITS sequences identified three well-supported clades corresponding to morphological differences among these species, and historical names within the group were reassessed, including the designation of new types for several taxa. Ramalina arsenii, described in 2021 from a mid-elevation montane area in Western Europe, grows on underhangs of slightly calcareous rock outcrops. The East Asian species R. yasudae and R. sekika differ from R. pollinaria by their larger soredia (typically around 100–150 μm versus 30–45 μm); R. sekika is further separated by the presence of sekikaic-series metabolites. Substrate preferences also help distinguish them: R. pollinaria grows on both bark and rock, R. yasudae is usually saxicolous in full sun, and R. sekika favours slightly shaded, shrub-covered sites.

== Habitat and distribution ==
As circumscribed by Gasparyan et al. (2017), Ramalina pollinaria is mainly a Eurasian species, with confirmed specimens from Sweden, the Netherlands, Belarus, Russia and Armenia. It tolerates a broad ecological niche yet is nowhere particularly common, growing at a wide range of elevations on the bark and old wood of various broad-leaved trees (e.g., Acer platanoides, Carpinus betulus, Fagus orientalis, Quercus robur, Tilia cordata, Robinia) as well as on different rock types. Records from South America and Australia have been referred to other taxa (R. chilena, R. unilateralis); African reports remain unverified; and the authors could not confirm any North American records, with most such material instead attributable to R. labiosorediata. A regional survey of Ramalina in the Hengduan Mountains reported material identified as Ramalina pollinaria from Sichuan and Yunnan, including collections on Quercus and Sorbus bark and one saxicolous specimen, at elevations of about 2,900–3,800 m.

== See also ==
- List of Ramalina species
