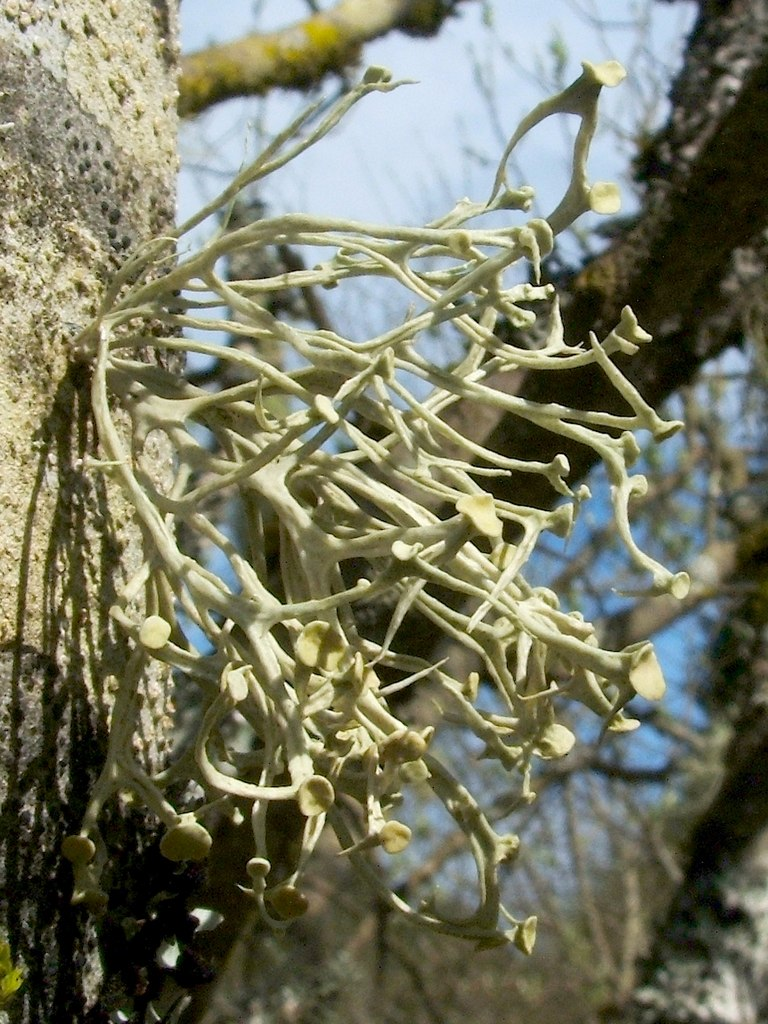

Scientific classification
- Kingdom: Fungi
- Division: Ascomycota
- Class: Lecanoromycetes
- Order: Lecanorales
- Family: Ramalinaceae
- Genus: Ramalina
- Species: R. calicaris

Binomial name
- Ramalina calicaris (L.) Röhl. (1813)

Synonyms
- List: Lichen calicaris L. (1753); Lobaria calicaris (L.) Hoffm. (1796); Parmelia fastigiata var. calicaris (L.) Ach. (1803); Ramalina fastigiata var. calicaris (L.) Ach. (1810); Platisma calicare (L.) Frege (1812); Platysma calicare (L.) Frege (1812); Ramalina fastigiata f. calicaris (L.) Ach. (1814); Physcia fastigiata var. calicaris (L.) Mérat (1821); Parmelia calicaris (L.) Wallr. (1831); Evernia calicaris (L.) Link (1833); Parmelia fraxinea var. calicaris (L.) Schaer. (1840); Ramalina fraxinea var. calicaris (L.) Schaer. (1850); Ramalina fraxinea f. calicaris (L.) Bosch (1853); Ramalina polymorpha C calicaris (L.) A.Massal. (1853); Ramalina polymorpha var. calicaris (L.) Bagl. (1857); Ramalina fraxinea subf. calicaris (L.) B.de Lesd. (1954); Lichen rostratus Scop. (1772); Lobaria calicaris var. dilacerata Hoffm. (1796); Ramalina calicaris f. canaliculata Fr. (1831); Ramalina calicaris var. canaliculata D.Dietr. (1832); Evernia calicaris var. canaliculata Link (1833); Ramalina calicaris var. subampliata Nyl. (1870); Ramalina calicaris subvar. subampliata (Nyl.) Boistel (1903); Ramalina fastigiata var. subampliata (Nyl.) R.Howe (1914); Ramalina subampliata (Nyl.) Fink (1935); Ramalina calicaris var. subfastigiata Nyl. (1870); Ramalina calicaris subvar. subfastigiata (Nyl.) Boistel (1903); Ramalina calicaris subvar. canaliculata Boistel (1903); Ramalina canaliculata Herre (1910); Ramalina calicaris subsp. canaliculata Fink (1910); Ramalina fraxinea subsp. canaliculata B.de Lesd. (1954)

= Ramalina calicaris =

Species of lichen-forming fungus

Ramalina calicaris is a species of fruticose, bark-dwelling lichen-forming fungus in the family Ramalinaceae. The lichen forms tufted to hanging, greenish-grey shrubby growth anchored by a holdfast at the base, with branches that are often distinctly channelled and strap-shaped, typically 2–3 mm wide and reaching 15–20 cm in length. Its reproductive structures are frequently produced, appearing as pale pink-ochre discs borne at the tips or margins of the branches, often on bends of angled branches with short spur-like projections. The species grows primarily on the branches and twigs of trees and shrubs with nutrient-rich bark, particularly in coastal settings and humid forests. Chemically, the cortex contains usnic acid, while the medulla may contain compounds of the sekikaic acid complex or lack additional substances.

The species occurs across Europe (where it is most frequent in western districts), North Africa, Macaronesia, and parts of Asia including China, India, and Thailand. The taxonomy of R. calicaris has been complicated by historical confusion over which specimens should be considered the original type material, leading to ongoing nomenclatural debates about the proper application of the name. Linnaeus's original Lichen calicaris encompassed both rock-dwelling and bark-dwelling material, but subsequent lectotypification fixed the name to a rock-dwelling specimen corresponding to Ramalina siliquosa, conflicting with long-established usage for the bark-dwelling species. Several taxa historically described as infraspecific forms of R. calicaris are now recognised as distinct species, including Ramalina farinacea, Ramalina fastigiata, and Ramalina fraxinea. The species is commonly fertile and has been shown (in at least one Asian variety) to be sensitive to nitrogen pollution.

== Taxonomy ==
The name Ramalina calicaris is based on the basionym Lichen calicaris, attributed to Carl Linnaeus in 1753. During this era, the term Lichen was used as a broad generic descriptor for nearly all known lichenized fungi, reflecting an early stage of biological classification where the symbiotic nature of the organism was not yet understood. In the protologue Linnaeus characterized it as an erect, narrow, branching lichen with a pitted (lacunose), convex surface and pointed (mucronate) tips, and gave its habitat as "in Europe, on trees and rocks". The species was reclassified in Ramalina by Johann Christoph Röhling in 1813, a genus erected by Erik Acharius in 1810. Some secondary and regional treatments instead cite the author as Elias Magnus Fries (1824), reflecting a later combination that remains in circulation in parts of the literature and regional databases.

In a 1913 revision of North American Ramalina, Reginald Heber Howe, Jr. reviewed the Linnean Society herbarium sheets associated with Lichen calicaris and reported that, among the specimens he regarded as original material, the better-preserved thalli correspond to the rock-dwelling taxon then treated as Ramalina scopulorum. He therefore argued that Linnaeus's brief diagnosis was more consistent with that concept than with Fries's later f. canaliculata, illustrating that uncertainty over how the epithet calicaris should be applied predates modern typification and conservation work. In a subsequent instalment of his North American revision, Howe (1914) treated the canaliculate taxon that had often circulated as R. calicaris in older American usage under the name Ramalina canaliculata (Fr.) Herre, tying it to Fries's R. calicaris "canaliculata" concept and summarizing its diagnostic features (including canaliculate laciniae and typically subterminal, spurred apothecia).

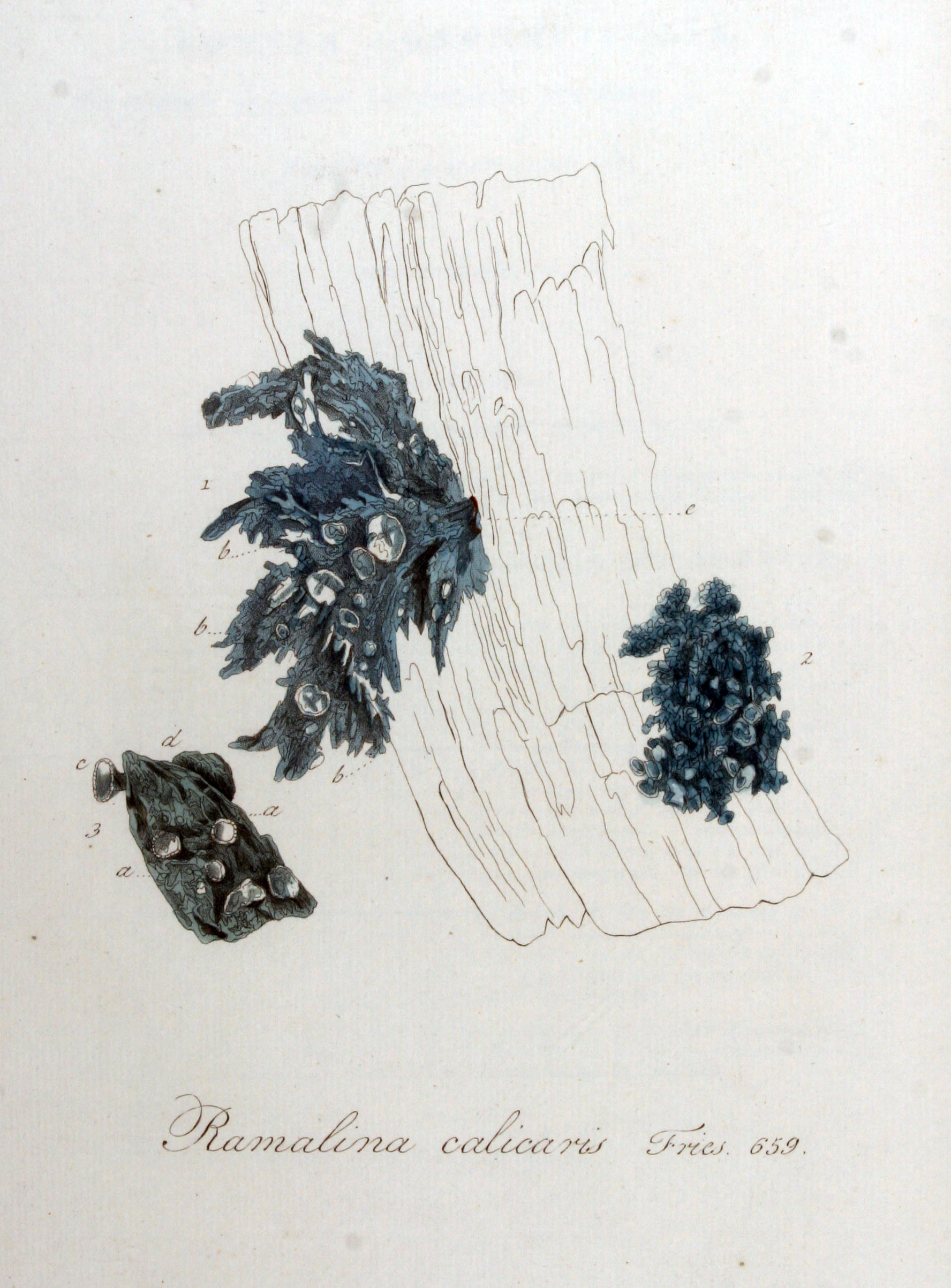
Ramalina calicaris, as illustrated by Christiaan Sepp in Flora Batava of Afbeelding en Beschrijving van Nederlandsche Gewassen (1846)

Howe also commented on the older "catch-all" use of R. calicaris in North American literature for intergrading forms, and reviewed Vainio's 1888 argument that Linnaeus's epithet calicaris should be applied to Fries's canaliculata on the basis of specimens in the Linnean herbarium. He rejected that evidentiary basis, arguing that the specimens in question were not Linnean types (and were probably added after Linnaeus's death) and that Linnaeus's original description is not diagnostic for the canaliculate taxon.

Sheard and James (1976), in a typification study of the Ramalina siliquosa species aggregate, re-examined the lectotype of Lichen calicaris (LINN 1273.115; lectotype designated by Howe) and reported that it belongs to the R. siliquosa complex and contains protocetraric acid. They also noted that other Linnean material previously treated as "type" for L. calicaris is in poor condition and does not correspond to the corticolous species that most lichenologists had long been calling Ramalina calicaris. A nomenclatural review of Linnaean lichen names reported that Linnaeus's original concept of Lichen calicaris encompassed both saxicolous (rock-dwelling) and corticolous (bark-dwelling) material. It concluded that Howe's lectotypification nevertheless fixes the name to a saxicolous specimen corresponding to Ramalina siliquosa and is "formally correct" under the Code; however, the authors described this outcome as "most unfortunate" because it conflicts with long-established usage of Ramalina calicaris for a corticolous species. To avoid a disruptive name change, the same review indicated that conservation of the name would be proposed so that Lichen calicaris could continue to be used in its traditional sense for the bark-dwelling species. In a separate paper, Jørgensen, James and Jarvis formally proposed conserving Lichen calicaris with a conserved type (from Dillenius's herbarium) that matches the corticolous species, so that Ramalina calicaris would continue in its long-established sense. The Nomenclature Committee for Fungi later recommended acceptance of the Linnaean-name proposals, including conservation of Lichen calicaris, supporting continued use of the name for the bark-dwelling species.

In discussing confusion among fertile, corticolous Ramalina in European herbaria, Groner and LaGreca (1997) traced long-running misapplications to imprecise original and subsequent diagnoses that did not cleanly delimit similar shrubby species, meaning that morphology alone often proved insufficient for routine identification in collections.

=== Former infraspecific taxa ===
Several taxa historically described as infraspecific types of Ramalina calicaris (forms, varieties, or subspecies) are now recognized as distinct species in Ramalina. These include:

- Ramalina calicaris f. ecklonii (Spreng.) Nyl. (1860), now Ramalina ecklonii
- Ramalina calicaris f. farinacea (L.) Nyl. (1857), Ramalina calicaris subsp. farinacea (L.) Fink (1910), and Ramalina calicaris var. farinacea (L.) Rabenh. (1845), now Ramalina farinacea
- Ramalina calicaris f. fastigiata (Pers.) Fr. (1831) and Ramalina calicaris var. fastigiata (Pers.) Fr. (1831), now Ramalina fastigiata
- Ramalina calicaris f. fraxinea (L.) Fr. (1831), Ramalina calicaris subsp. fraxinea (L.) Fink (1910) and Ramalina calicaris var. fraxinea (L.) Mont. (1840), now Ramalina fraxinea
- Ramalina calicaris f. thrausta (Ach.) Fr. (1831), Ramalina calicaris subsp. thrausta (Ach.) Ach. (1860), and Ramalina calicaris var. thrausta (Ach.) Flagey (1882), now Ramalina thrausta
- Ramalina calicaris var. dilacerata (Hoffm.) Flot. (1850), now Ramalina dilacerata
- Ramalina calicaris var. inflata (Hook.f. & Taylor) Tuck. (1868), now Ramalina inflata

== Description ==
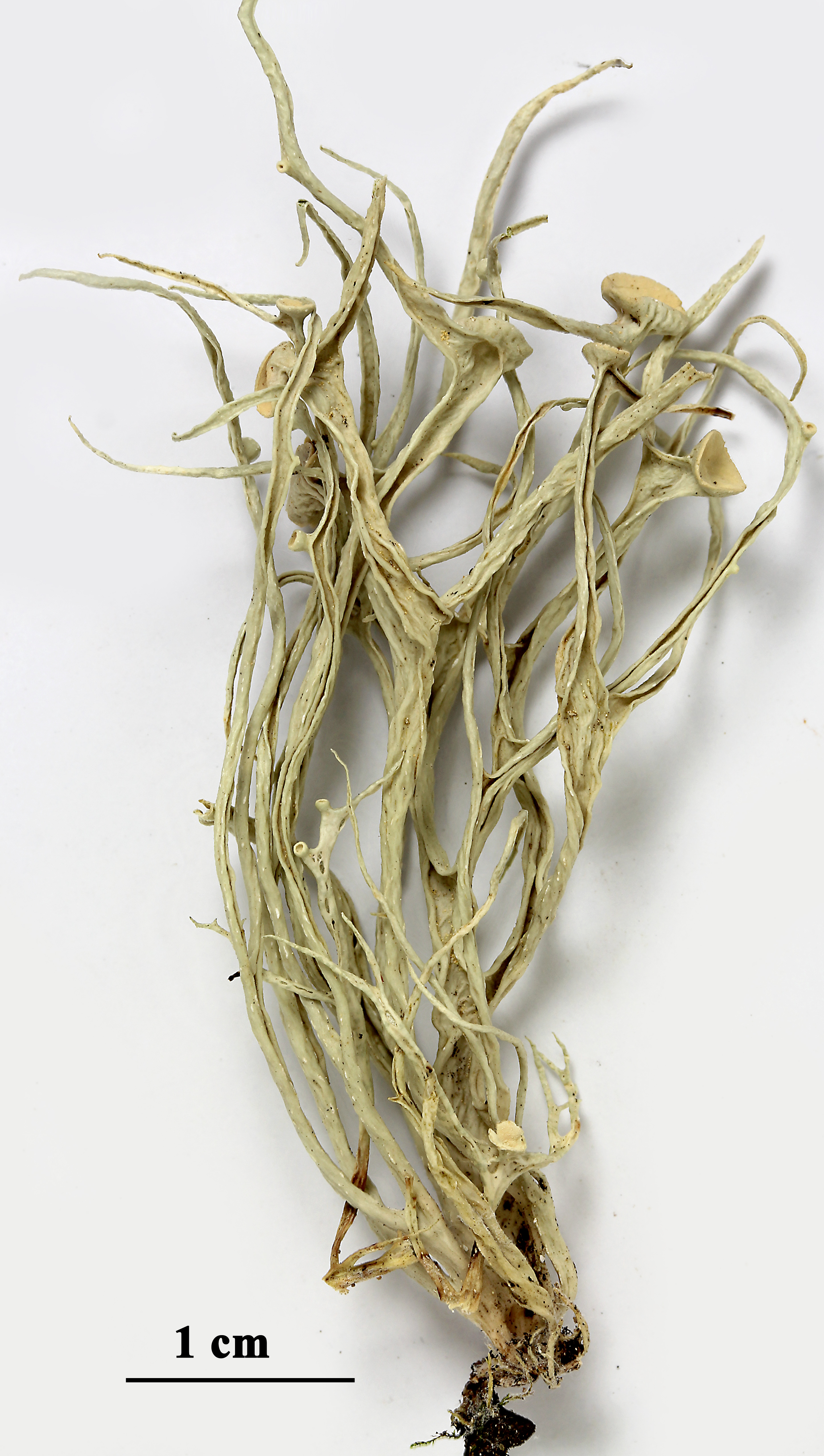
Specimen collected from Oberbayern, Germany

Ramalina calicaris is a fruticose (shrubby) lichen with a greenish grey thallus, anchored to the substrate by a basal holdfast. Thalli are often tufted when young, but may become longer and more pendent with age, reaching about 15–20 cm in length in some accounts. The branches (laciniae) are typically strap-shaped and relatively sparingly branched. They are often distinctly channelled (canaliculate) and commonly about 2–3 mm wide, though broader forms have been reported. The surface is described as smooth to weakly wrinkled, and thalli may appear stiff and spiky when dry. Small pores (pseudocyphellae) penetrate the surface; these range from dot-like to spindle-shaped and may be few or numerous depending on the specimen.

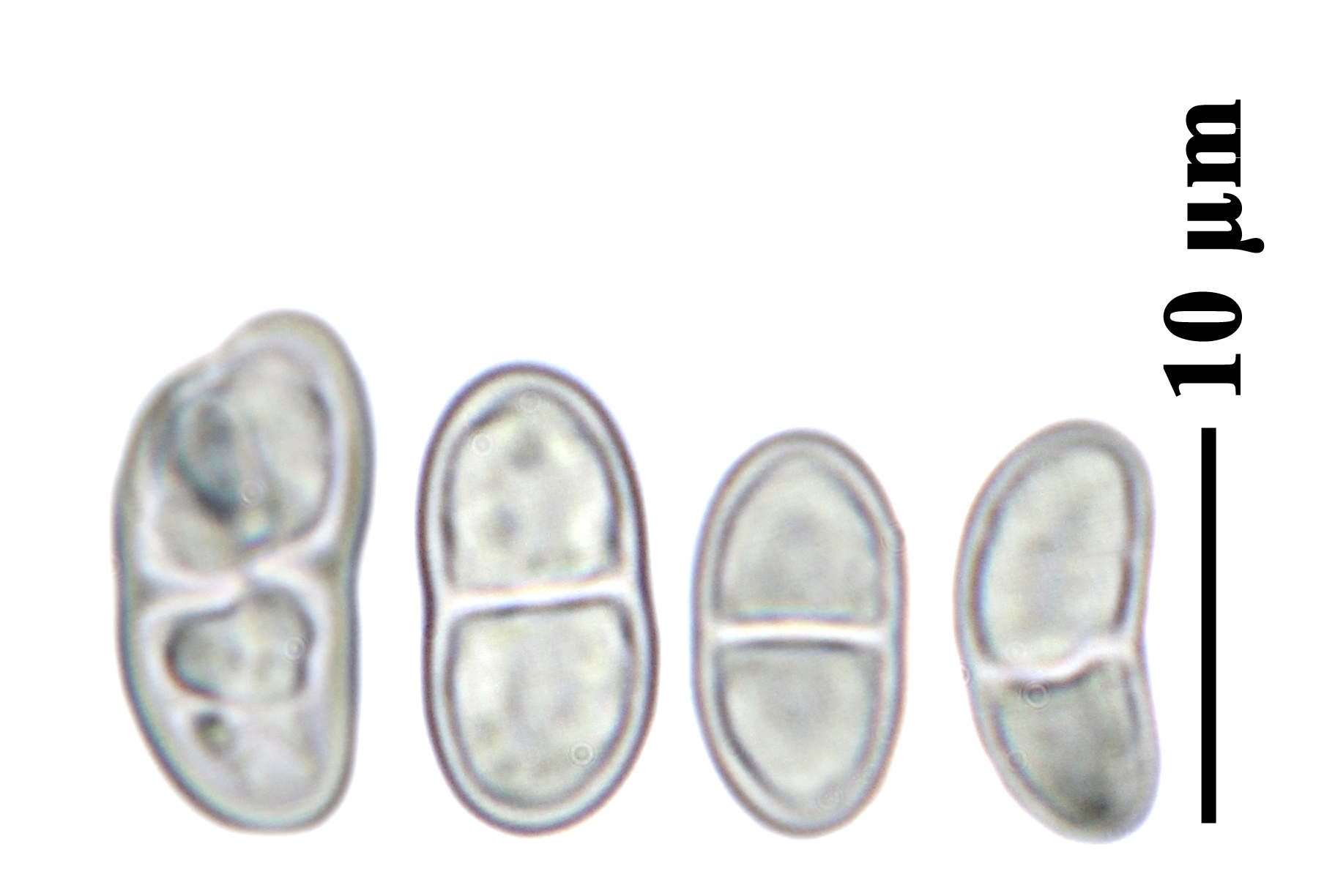
Examples of the hyaline, 1-septate ascospores of R. calicaris

Apothecia (spore-producing structures) are usually frequent and lecanorine in form, typically positioned at or near the tips of the branches, though they can also occur along the margins. They may develop on bends of angled branches and can sometimes show a short spur-like projection. The disc has been described as pale pink-ochre with a thin thalline margin. The spore-bearing structures (asci) each contain eight spores and have an apical tip whose iodine-staining pattern matches the Bacidia type. Ascospores are hyaline and 1-septate, with reported sizes around 10–16 × 5–7 μm.

The photosynthetic partner (photobiont) is a chlorococcoid green alga. Spot tests on the medulla have been reported as negative (K−, C−, KC−, P−, UV−), with some regional treatments summarizing this as K−/C−. Chemically, the cortex contains usnic acid, while the medulla is variably reported as lacking additional substances or containing compounds of the sekikaic acid complex (including sekikaic and homosekikaic acids). A biochemical study of bark-dwelling lichens on Pyrenean oak (Quercus pyrenaica) in central Spain detected several polyamines—small nitrogen-containing molecules involved in stress responses and growth—in R. calicaris thalli. These compounds (putrescine, spermidine, and spermine) were found both in free form and chemically bound to other cellular components. The same study confirmed the presence of usnic acid and sekikaic acid (the two main secondary metabolites characteristic of this species), and found that usnic acid also occurs in a chemically bound form rather than existing only as free crystals in the lichen tissue.

In some forms the thallus can resemble Evernia prunastri, but R. calicaris has been distinguished by its tough, cartilaginous subcortex and by photobiont cells occurring beneath all thallus surfaces in that comparison. Brandt (1906), in a comparative anatomical study of European Ramalina, described the cortex as a thin layer of cell-like tissue underlain by a near-continuous ring of strengthening hyphae; beneath this lies a loosely woven medulla, with algal cells clustered in a band near the boundary between cortex and medulla. In the same material he reported calcium oxalate in the medulla, no yellow or red colour change of the medulla with potassium hydroxide or barium hydroxide solution ("baryta water"), and no observed breaks of the medulla through the cortex, treating these as anatomical characters useful for comparison among European species.

=== Similar species ===
In the field and in herbaria, R. calicaris has often been confused with other fertile, shrubby Ramalina, especially R. fastigiata and R. subgeniculata; Groner and LaGreca (1997) summarized R. calicaris as typically having narrow, canaliculate branches and apothecia that are often subapical to lateral, frequently with an apical "spur", and emphasized secondary chemistry as a practical separator within this complex (for example, evernic acid in R. fastigiata versus divaricatic acid in R. subgeniculata, with R. calicaris reported with sekikaic-acid group substances or sometimes lacking medullary substances).

Wirth (2011) likewise contrasted R. calicaris with R. fastigiata and R. fraxinea, noting differences in growth form and branch morphology, and reported sekikaic acid verified by thin-layer chromatography (TLC) for the 1999 material. Ramalina calicaris can resemble R. elegans, but it differs in having a solid thallus, a more regularly grooved (sulcate) surface toward the base, and apothecia that are mostly marginal.

== Habitat and distribution ==
Ramalina calicaris is primarily corticolous (bark-dwelling), typically growing on branches and twigs rather than on trunks. It is most often associated with trees and shrubs with relatively nutrient-rich bark, and is reported as occurring frequently in coastal settings in parts of its European range. Aptroot and de Bruyn (2011) described it as occurring mostly in coastal regions in Europe but emphasized that, unlike several other Ramalina species, it is not a maritime lichen; they also suggested that its frequent occurrence on small twigs, possibly in the canopy, may contribute to under-recording. In Italy it is recorded mainly from deciduous trees (more rarely conifers), with occurrences reported especially on branches in humid beech forests, though some older records have been flagged as needing confirmation.

In Britain and Ireland, the species is mapped and assessed as Least Concern within that framework, and it is described as most frequent in western districts, with more easterly records considered local. Italian records span multiple regions, but distribution reporting has been complicated by historical misidentifications, with at least one earlier regional report explicitly attributed to confusion with other taxa. The species has also been documented from Bosnia and Herzegovina and Greece. Aptroot and de Bruyn (2011) reported two recent German records: fertile thalli on Salix caprea on Borkum (East Frisian Islands), about 4 m above ground in a well-lit but sheltered site and occurring with R. fastigiata and R. farinacea, and a large sterile thallus from near Gerolstein in the Eifel, identified by its canaliculate form and reported (by TLC) to contain only usnic acid. They also reported a marked decline since the 19th century and noted that the species is considered extinct in several countries, including the Netherlands. In Germany, R. calicaris has been re-documented from several areas in the south-west in recent decades. Wirth (2011) argued that the species was apparently a continuous element of the regional lichen biota: it was correctly reported until the 1950s, then overlooked or misinterpreted, before being rediscovered under its correct name in 1999 in the Swabian Alb; subsequent revision of herbarium material revealed additional mid-20th-century collections, supporting persistence rather than recent immigration. The current sites are described as mostly in well-lit habitats in areas with annual precipitation above about 900 mm, with thalli recorded mainly on Fraxinus and Acer (including Acer campestre), occurring on both branches and the mid-trunk and reaching roughly 15 cm in diameter in some stands.

Beyond Europe, the species' range extends into Macaronesia and North Africa, with records also reported from Asia. In North America, what was traditionally called R. calicaris is now understood to be a complex of species, including R. americana and R. culbersoniorum. While these species look nearly identical to the European R. calicaris, they form distinct phylogenetic lineages and often differ in their medullary chemistry. R. calicaris is reported from China, where it grows on bark at elevations of about 1,350–3,500 m in the Hengduan Mountains material treated there. It has also been recorded from northern Thailand (Chiang Mai Province), and broader summaries of its Asian distribution include China, India, Indonesia, Taiwan, Armenia, and Iran.

== Ecology ==
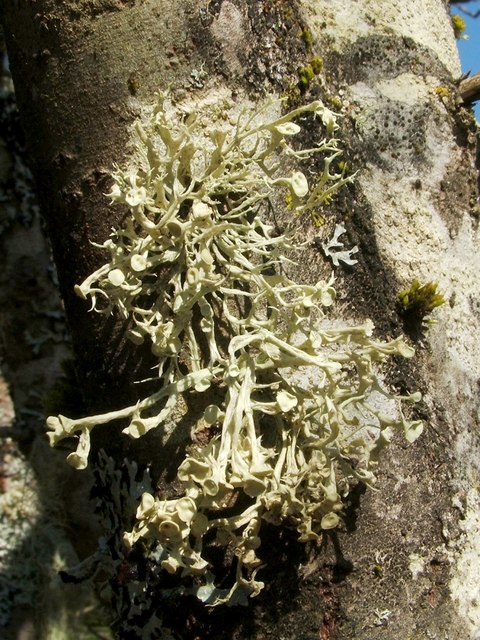
On a tree in Luss, Scotland

Ramalina calicaris is a symbiotic lichen with a chlorococcoid (green) algal photobiont. Thalli are commonly fertile, with apothecia reported as frequent in multiple regional accounts, suggesting that sexual reproduction is an important means of persistence and dispersal in this species where it occurs.

Experimental work on Ramalina calicaris var. japonica (a variety from East Asia) indicates sensitivity to increased nitrogen pollution. In that study, higher nitrogen deposition was associated with reduced growth of the lichen body and lower survival of reproductive fragments, and the researchers proposed that this variety begins to suffer harm at nitrogen deposition levels above about 6 kg per hectare per year under the experimental conditions used. Because the work focused on this particular variety, it remains unclear whether other populations of R. calicaris share the same sensitivity threshold. A separate short-term study conducted in the Shennongjia Mountains of China examined how the lichen responds to increased nitrogen deposition. The researchers simulated nitrogen pollution at various levels and found that as nitrogen increased, the lichen absorbed more nitrogen while phosphorus levels increased more slowly, creating an imbalance between these two essential nutrients. The lichen responded by producing more of an enzyme (phosphomonoesterase) that releases phosphorus from organic matter. The researchers interpreted this as a shift from nitrogen limitation to phosphorus limitation—in effect, trading one nutrient shortage for another. In Britain, Ramalina calicaris has been treated as one of the epiphytic indicator lichens used in qualitative mapping of sulphur dioxide pollution. In the zonation scheme summarised by Broad (after Hawksworth & Rose), it appears only in the cleaner-air zones on basic or nutrient-enriched bark (around 40 μg per cubic metre mean winter SO_{2} and below), and is reported as well developed in the least polluted zones.

The species' secondary chemistry has been discussed in regional and broader treatments of the genus. Usnic acid is consistently reported from the cortex, while compounds of the sekikaic acid group (including sekikaic and homosekikaic acids) are variably reported from the medulla. Chemical investigations of Ramalina have also included work explicitly addressing constituents of R. calicaris in the context of wider reviews of metabolites and biological activity in the genus. A field study on Pyrenean oak branches supporting a heavy cover of epiphytic lichens found that spermidine was the only polyamine detected in xylem exudates and that its concentration was higher in exudates from defoliated, lichen-colonised branches than from branches without lichens. The same study detected atranorin in xylem exudates only from the defoliated, lichen-covered branches, and discussed these findings as possible evidence for transfer of lichen metabolites into host tissues.

Several lichenicolous (lichen-dwelling) fungi have been recorded growing on R. calicaris. In Britain, Hawksworth (1976) described a Lichenoconium fungus infecting the apothecia of R. calicaris in South Devon (on Salix), causing a brownish-black, often patchy discolouration, and noted co-occurrence of Abrothallus suecicus and its presumed pycnidial state Phoma ramalinae on the same host at the site. Other lichenicolous fungi reported on the species include Polycoccum sp. and Marchandiomyces corallinus in Britain and Ireland, and A. suecicus in material from the northwest Iberian Peninsula.

== See also ==
- List of lichens named by Carl Linnaeus
- List of Ramalina species
