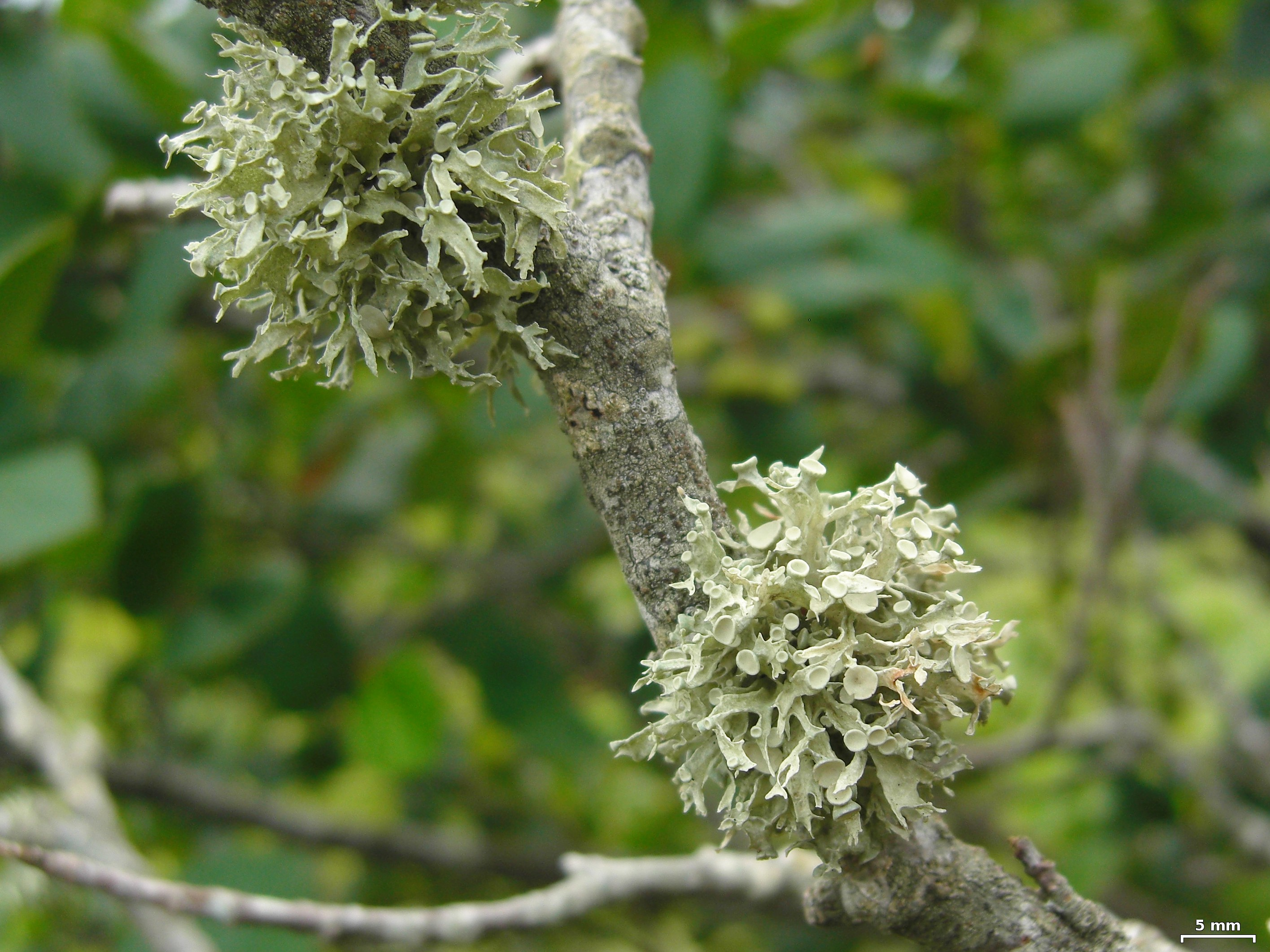

Conservation status
- Secure (NatureServe)

Scientific classification
- Kingdom: Fungi
- Division: Ascomycota
- Class: Lecanoromycetes
- Order: Lecanorales
- Family: Ramalinaceae
- Genus: Ramalina
- Species: R. americana

Binomial name
- Ramalina americana Hale (1979)

= Ramalina americana =

Species of lichen-forming fungus

Ramalina americana, commonly known as the sinewed ramalina, is a pale green fruticose lichen that is found across the Northern US Midwest, extending into Southern Canada and the Eastern Seaboard. It is characterized morphologically by the presence of pseudocyphellae, straight spores, and its unique chemical diversity.

== Taxonomy ==
The species first characterized by American lichenologist Mason Hale in 1978, who distinguished it from the similar European species Ramalina fastigiata. The type specimen was collected by Clara Eaton Cummings in Plymouth, New Hampshire, and featured in her work Decades of North American Lichens no. 43. A vernacular name used for the species is "sinewed ramalina".

== Morphology ==
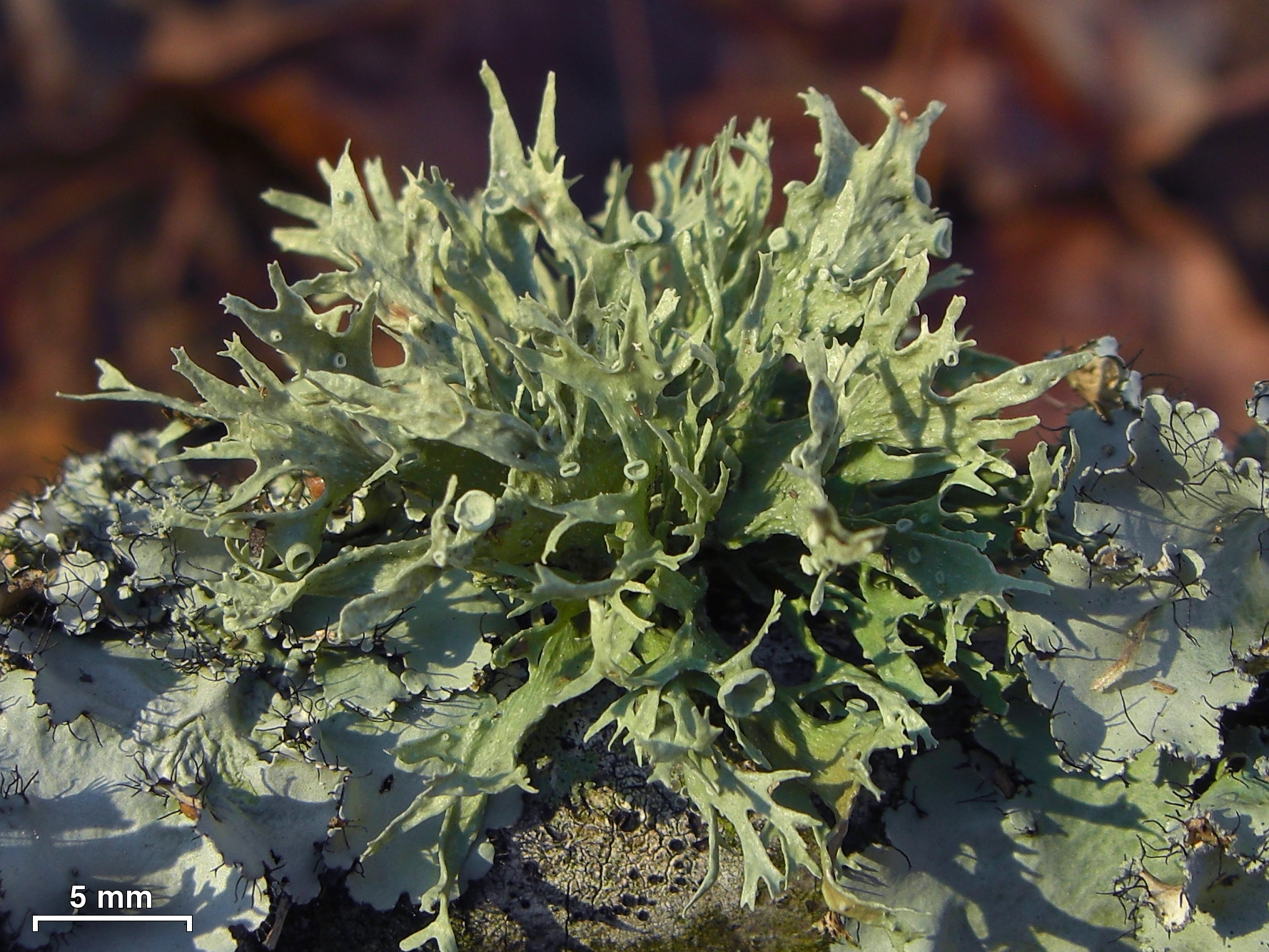
Note the apothecia growing from the tips of the thallus as well as the narrow, divided branches.

R. americana grows as a pale green thallus from a singular holdfast. It features narrow, divided branches that are marked with depressions and ridges. The apothecia grow close or on the tips of the branches. Its spores are predominantly straight, and it has pseudocyphellae on the thallus surface. It contains the lichen product usnic acid.

== Distribution ==
R. americana is found throughout the Midwest, southern Canada, and areas of the Eastern coastline. The Ramalina genus is well distributed and highly prolific. R. americana is obligately epiphytic, growing exclusively attached to the bark of living trees, as opposed to Ramalina siliquosa, which grows on rocks.

== Taxonomy and chemotyping ==
Ramalina americana features a well studied chemotype that has frequently undergone varying taxonomic reclassification. When first differentiated by Hale in 1978, it was described both as having a largely acid-deficient population in the northern ends of its range, as well as a much more chemically diverse southern distribution featuring five varying chemotypes. These chemotypes were later classified by Jonathan Dey in 1978, who discovered a varying range of depsidones, acids, and other lichen products.

In 1999, genetic internal transcribed spacer regions were used to identify a considerably similar sequence data compared to the highly varying chemotypes of neighboring R. americana populations. These results suggested similar biosynthetic pathways for many of the secondary metabolites produced in the R. americana chemotype.

The same 1999 study identified an unlikelihood that environmental variation results in the variation in the chemotypes as observed. Other studies attribute some variation in chemotype to potential gene-environment interactions, but still emphasize the consistent genetic inheritance of chemotypical variance.

Findings in the 1999 study identify a potential polyphyly of the southeastern chemotype rich R. americana varieties, and further separated the northern, acid deficient species as R. americana, and the southern distribution as R. culbersoniorum. This was further expanded upon in a study in 2012 that revealed despite evidence for monophyly found in 2004, novel ITS data further emphasized a low support for monophyly. In 2020, the separation of the R. americana chemotype complex into two distinct species was reemphasized in a new paper.

== Evolutionary history ==
Ramalina americana is presumed to have differentiated from its European sister species, Ramalina fastigiata.

== See also ==
- List of Ramalina species
