= Xanthoparmelia equalis =

Scientific classification
- Kingdom: Fungi
- Division: Ascomycota
- Class: Lecanoromycetes
- Order: Lecanorales
- Family: Parmeliaceae
- Genus: Xanthoparmelia
- Species: X. equalis

Binomial name
- Xanthoparmelia equalis Hale (1986)

Species of lichen

Xanthoparmelia equalis is a species of saxicolous (rock-dwelling), foliose lichen in the family Parmeliaceae. Endemic to Namibia, it was formally described as a new species in 1986 by the American lichenologist Mason Hale. The type specimen was collected from the Laguneberg Mountains, in district Omaruru. It contains evernic acid, usnic acid, and trace amounts of lecanoric acid. Two other similar species that occur in similar localities are Xanthoparmelia lagunebergensis and Xanthoparmelia serusiauxii; the former can be distinguished from X. equalis by having protocetraric acid, and the latter by having lecanoric acid.

== See also ==
- List of Xanthoparmelia species
