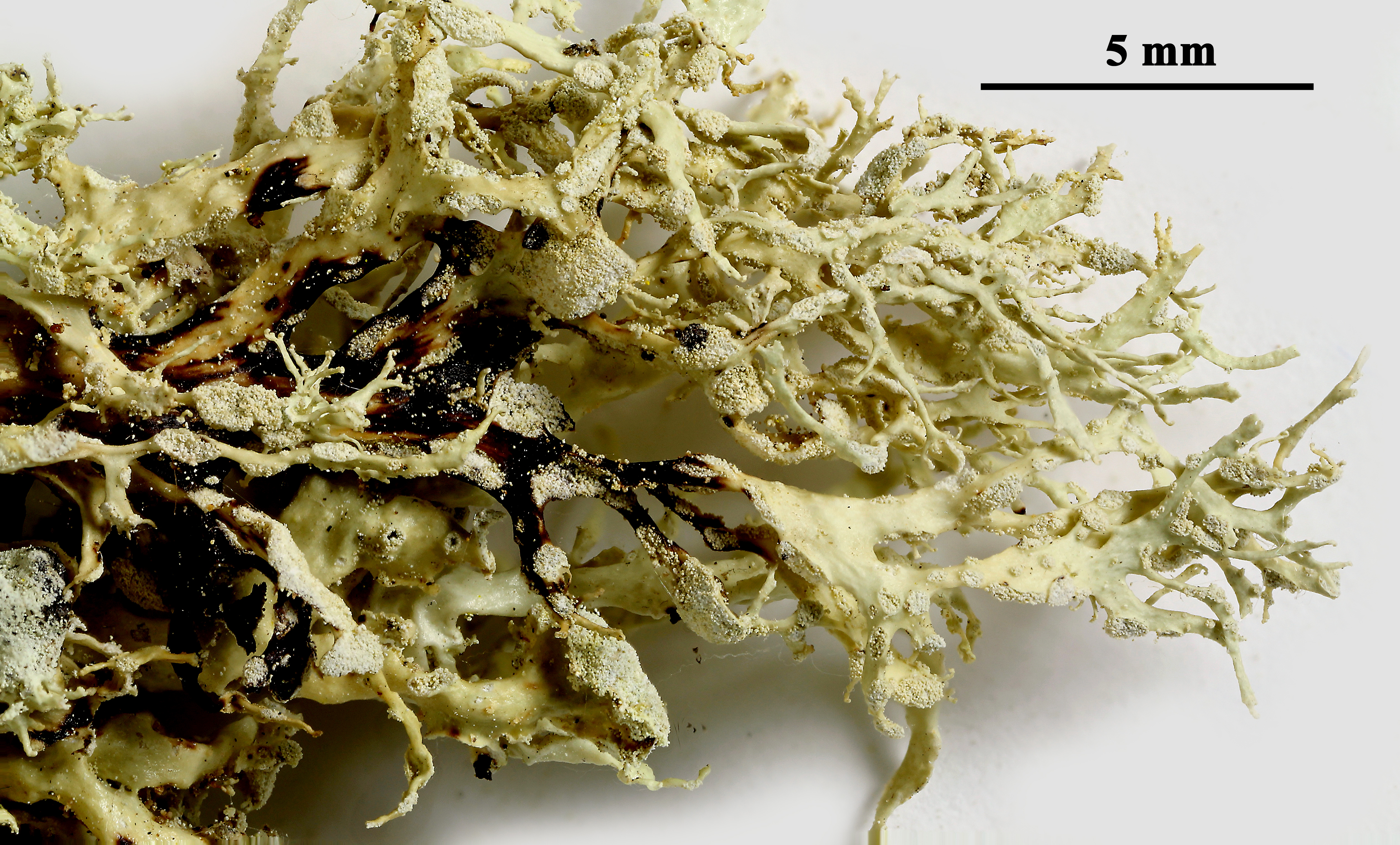

Scientific classification
- Kingdom: Fungi
- Division: Ascomycota
- Class: Lecanoromycetes
- Order: Lecanorales
- Family: Ramalinaceae
- Genus: Ramalina
- Species: R. europaea

Binomial name
- Ramalina europaea Gasparyan, Sipman & Lücking (2017)
- Holotype: Dagöholmsbackarna, Sweden

= Ramalina europaea =

Species of lichen-forming fungus

Ramalina europaea is a species of fruticose lichen in the family Ramalinaceae. This species is widely distributed across Europe and is distinguished by its small, punctiform (point-like) soralia that often develop terminally on spine-like branchlets.

== Taxonomy ==
The species was formally described in 2017 by Arsen Gasparyan, along with co-authors Harrie Sipman and Robert Lücking, in a publication focusing on the taxonomy and phylogeny of the Ramalina pollinaria group. The species was found to be closely related to Ramalina pollinaria, but it differs by its morphological characteristics, particularly the presence of terminal soralia. The species is also phylogenetically distinct, as shown through internal transcribed spacer sequence analysis. The type specimen of Ramalina europaea was collected on 7 May 2015, by Gasparyan in Sweden. It was found in Södermanland County, Lerbo parish, approximately 1.7 km northeast of Lerbo Church and 600 m southwest of Dagöholm, in a Natura 2000-designated habitat known as Dagöholmsbackarna. The habitat is an old wooded meadow with grazing, featuring ancient oak trees (Quercus robur) where the lichen was growing on the bark. This specimen, designated as the holotype (B 60 0201019), is preserved in the herbarium of the Berlin Botanical Garden and Botanical Museum.

The species epithet europaea refers to its broad distribution across Europe. It was described alongside another species, Ramalina labiosorediata, which is mainly found in North America.

== Description ==
Ramalina europaea is a fruticose (bushy or shrubby) lichen with a pale yellow-green thallus, which can grow up to 4–6 cm tall. The branches are narrow, angular to flattened, and are typically 1–2 mm wide. These branches lack a central cord, a feature that distinguishes species in the genus Ramalina from similar lichens in genera such as Usnea and Evernia.

A key identifying feature of Ramalina europaea is its soralia, which are the reproductive structures that produce soredia—a powdery mix of fungal and algal cells used for asexual reproduction. The soralia are small and punctiform (dot-like), often appearing at the ends of spine-like branchlets. They are typically 0.1–0.5 mm in diameter and can develop both terminally (at the tips of the branches) and subterminally (just below the tips). The soralia start off granular, eventually becoming more extensive as they spread over the branch surface. R. europaea typically develops ovoid excavate depressions on its lower surface, which are a key identifying feature. When the species grows on rocks (saxicolous), these depressions are much smaller than those observed in specimens growing on trees (epiphytic), though they remain present and identifiable.

This species contains two main secondary metabolites: usnic acid, responsible for its light green colour, and evernic acid. These compounds can be identified using thin-layer chromatography, a technique often used to analyse lichen chemistry.

Unlike many other lichens, Ramalina europaea does not form apothecia, which are the sexual fruiting bodies responsible for releasing spores. Instead, this species reproduces entirely through its soredia, which are dispersed by wind or rain to new surfaces, where they can establish and grow.

The surface of the thallus is relatively smooth, though the areas around the soralia may appear slightly roughened as the soredia develop. Ramalina europaea does not produce isidia (small, finger-like structures that some lichens use for reproduction), which helps distinguish it from other related species that do.

Microscopically, Ramalina europaea has hyaline (translucent) ascospores that are single-celled and measure approximately 8–12 μm in length and 4–5 μm in width. Although apothecia are absent, these spore measurements help place the species within its taxonomic group. The photobiont in R. europaea is a green alga.

== Habitat and distribution ==
Ramalina europaea is widely distributed in temperate regions across Europe, including Armenia, France, Germany, Greece, Italy, Poland, Russia, Spain, Sweden, and Ukraine. More recent research has expanded its known range to include Belgium, Iran, Norway, Romania, Lithuania, and Dagestan in the North Caucasus. The species has been found in both lowland and upland areas, with specimens collected at elevations ranging from as low as 125 m (410 ft) in Norway to 1,800 m (5,900 ft) in the French Alps.

This lichen typically grows on the bark of trees and sometimes on wood. It has been observed on various tree species, including Quercus (oak) and Tilia (linden), as well as in disturbed deciduous forests and open forest environments. R. europaea is not limited to arboreal habitats; it has also been found growing on volcanic breccia, demonstrating its ability to colonise rocky substrates.

== See also ==
- List of Ramalina species
