= Xanthoparmelia calvinia =

Scientific classification
- Kingdom: Fungi
- Division: Ascomycota
- Class: Lecanoromycetes
- Order: Lecanorales
- Family: Parmeliaceae
- Genus: Xanthoparmelia
- Species: X. calvinia

Binomial name
- Xanthoparmelia calvinia Hale (1986)

Species of lichen-forming fungus

Xanthoparmelia calvinia is a species of saxicolous (rock-dwelling), foliose lichen in the family Parmeliaceae. Found in the Cape Province of South Africa, it was formally described as a new species in 1986 by the American lichenologist Mason Hale. The type specimen was collected from the Akkerendam Nature Reserve near Calvinia, at an elevation of about 1,000 m (3,300 ft); there, it was found growing on low dolerite ridges. The lichen contains usnic acid in addition to three unidentified lichen substances. The lichen is characterized by its hollow, roughly spherical isidia, which are somewhat similar to Xanthoparmelia evernica.

== See also ==
- List of Xanthoparmelia species
