= Xanthoparmelia serusiauxii =

Scientific classification
- Domain: Eukaryota
- Kingdom: Fungi
- Division: Ascomycota
- Class: Lecanoromycetes
- Order: Lecanorales
- Family: Parmeliaceae
- Genus: Xanthoparmelia
- Species: X. serusiauxii

Binomial name
- Xanthoparmelia serusiauxii Hale (1986)

Species of lichen

Xanthoparmelia serusiauxii is a species of foliose lichen in the family Parmeliaceae. Found in Namibia, it was formally described as a new species in 1986 by American lichenologist Mason Hale. The type specimen was collected by Hale from the Laguneberg Mountains, southeast of Cape Cross. There, it is common on dolerite boulders and small, flat pebbles. The specific epithet honours Emmanuël Sérusiaux, who, according to Hale, "was the first lichenologist to collect this unusual lichen in Namibia".

The lichen has a foliose thallus measuring 5–10 cm (2–4 in) wide with a dull greenish-yellow colour that tends to blacken in the centre with age. The lobes that comprise the thallus are 1–2 mm wide, and have black rims. Isidia and soredia are absent from the thallus. The medulla is particularly thick and soft. The few rhizines it has are coarse, black, and measure 0.3–0.5 mm long. Xanthoparmelia serusiauxii contains the secondary compounds lecanoric acid and usnic acid. Other Xanthoparmelia species that commonly occur in the same area are X. evernica and X. lagunebergensis.

In a study of the lichen growth form distributions within the lichen fields of the Central Namib desert, Xanthoparmelia serusiauxii was found to occur in areas subject to the abrasive action of strong winds carrying sand, and subject to more severe drought due to less frequent occurrence of fog.

== See also ==
- List of Xanthoparmelia species
