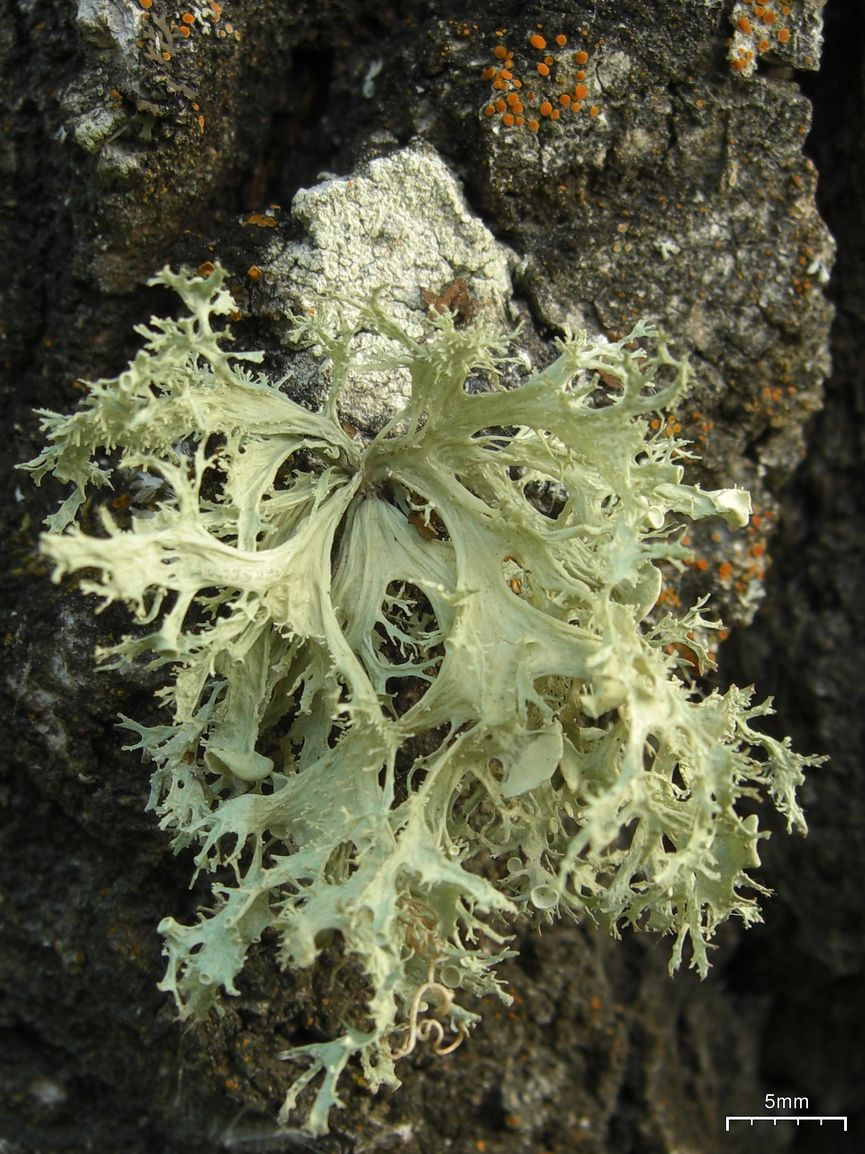

Conservation status
- Secure (NatureServe)

Scientific classification
- Kingdom: Fungi
- Division: Ascomycota
- Class: Lecanoromycetes
- Order: Lecanorales
- Family: Ramalinaceae
- Genus: Ramalina
- Species: R. dilacerata

Binomial name
- Ramalina dilacerata (Hoffm.) Hoffm.

= Ramalina dilacerata =

Species of fungus

Ramalina dilacerata, commonly known as punctured ribbon lichen, is a lichen species belonging to the family Ramalinaceae. The species was first described in 1796 as Lobaria dilacerata Hoffm., and later transferred to the genus Ramalina by Hoffmann in 1825.

== Description ==
Ramalina dilacerata exhibits a fruticose growth form, with a pale yellowish-green thallus reaching up to 1.5(-2) cm in height. The thallus is erect to ascending and abundantly branched, firmly attached to the substrate by a basal holdfast, resulting in shrubby tufts up to 2 cm broad.

The branches are less than 1 mm wide, inflated and hollow (fistulose), pellucid when wet, and bear a few to numerous small, elongated or rounded openings (fenestrations). The cortex is thin, while the medulla is white, very lax, especially beneath the apothecia, with sparse hyphae forming discontinuous bundles of chondroid tissue.

Apothecia are frequently present, lecanorine in nature, with a greenish disc and a thin, smooth thalline margin. These reproductive structures are mostly situated subterminal on the smaller branches, subtended by a short, pointed spur.

The asci are 8-spored, clavate, and of the Bacidia-type. The ascospores are 1-septate, hyaline, and shortly fusiform, measuring 12-15 x 4-6 μm.

The photobiont associated with R. dilacerata is a chlorococcoid green alga.

== Chemistry ==
Spot tests on the thallus and medulla yield negative results for K, C, KC, and P.

The thallus of Ramalina dilacerata contains usnic acid in the cortex, while the medulla is characterized by the presence of sekikaic acid, without any detectable amounts of homosekikaic or divaricatic acids.

== Distribution and ecology ==
The geographical range of R. dilacerata extends across North America, stretching from Alaska down to California and westward of the Cascade Mountain range. This lichen can also be found further inland, as far as western Montana. It thrives primarily in riparian forests and shrublands at low elevations, though it may occasionally occur in areas with strong oceanic influences, east of the Cascades.

In Europe, records of R. dilacerata have been documented in a handful of locations across northern and central Italy, including the regions of Veneto, Trentino-Alto Adige, Abruzzo, Molise, Campania, and Basilicata. However, the species is considered extremely rare in the montane and subalpine belts of the Italian peninsula.

Ramalina dilacerata typically colonizes the bark and twigs of acid-barked trees, especially conifers. More rarely, this lichen may also grow on lignum (woody material) in highly humid environments.

== Conservation status ==
Globally, Ramalina dilacerata is ranked as G5 by NatureServe, indicating that it is "secure" and commonly encountered throughout its range.

In Canada, the species is classified as N5, meaning it is "common, widespread, and abundant" at the national level. At the provincial scale, its status varies from S1S3 (critically imperiled to vulnerable) in Newfoundland, to S5 (secure) in several other provinces.

Within the United States, R. dilacerata has not been formally assessed, but it is known to occur in the state of Montana.

In Italy, R. dilacerata is included in the national red list of epiphytic lichens as "Vulnerable" due to its extreme rarity in the montane and subalpine regions of the country.

== Synonyms ==
Synonyms for this species include:

- Fistulariella dilacerata (Hoffm.) Bowler & Riefner
- Ramalina minuscula Nyl.

== See also ==
- List of Ramalina species
