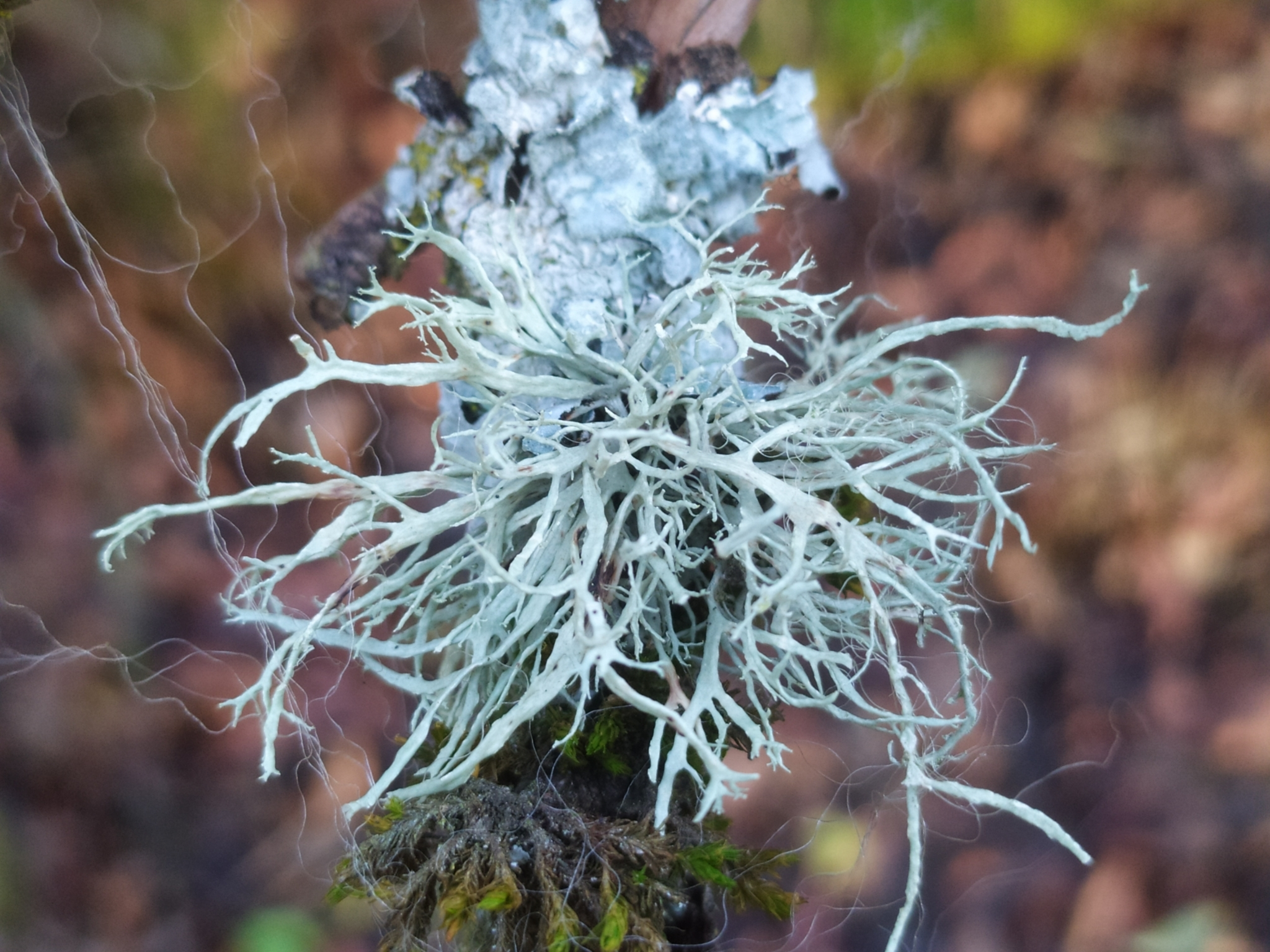

Conservation status
- Secure (NatureServe)

Scientific classification
- Kingdom: Fungi
- Division: Ascomycota
- Class: Lecanoromycetes
- Order: Lecanorales
- Family: Ramalinaceae
- Genus: Ramalina
- Species: R. farinacea

Binomial name
- Ramalina farinacea (L.) Ach. (1810)

Synonyms
- Lichen farinaceus L. (1753)

= Ramalina farinacea =

Species of lichen-forming fungus

Ramalina farinacea is a species of fruticose lichen in the family Ramalinaceae. It appears as small, shrub-like tufts typically 3–6 cm (1.2–2.4 in) long that hang from tree branches and trunks, particularly in woodland areas and on isolated trees. Distinguished by its flattened, yellow-green to grey-green branches with powdery white spots along the edges, this lichen is widespread throughout temperate regions, especially in coastal areas with oceanic climates. First scientifically described by Carl Linnaeus in 1753 and later reclassified by Erik Acharius in 1810, it is remarkably tolerant of air pollution compared to other lichens, which enables it to thrive in environments where similar species cannot survive. While primarily reproducing through the dispersal of powdery particles called soredia, it occasionally produces disc-shaped fruiting bodies (apothecia) along its branches.

== Taxonomy ==
The species was first scientifically described by Carl Linnaeus in 1753. In his original description, published in Species Plantarum, Linnaeus named it Lichen foliaceus and diagnosed it as "a leafy, erect, compressed, branched, mealy lichen with warty sides". He provided several synonyms used by earlier botanists, including references to works by Dillenius (Historia Muscorum) and Vaillant (Botanicon Parisiense).

In 1810, Erik Acharius formally transferred the species to the genus Ramalina in his work Lichenographia Universalis. His detailed Latin description characterised the species as having an erect-compressed, glabrous (smooth), somewhat lacunose (pitted), sorediate, rigid, branched thallus with a whitish-greyish colouration and linear-attenuated branches. Acharius noted the apothecia as scattered, stalked, flat, slightly immarginate, and whitish, though he remarked they were very rare. He also carefully distinguished R. farinacea from similar species including R. fastigiata, R. scopulorum, and R. pollinaria, noting differences in soredia, thallus form, branch structure, rigidity, and apothecial characteristics.

The specific epithet farinacea derives from the Latin word farina (flour or meal), referring to the mealy or powdery appearance of the soredia that develop along the margins of the thallus branches.

Ramalina farinacea belongs to a broader taxonomic group known as the "Ramalina farinacea complex" that includes several closely related species distributed worldwide. The species boundaries within this complex have been subject to considerable confusion, particularly in tropical and subtropical regions. Throughout much of the 20th century, many tropical sorediate Ramalina specimens were misidentified as R. farinacea, despite showing distinctive "nervulose" markings (longitudinal striations and pseudocyphellae) that differentiate them from the temperate species. Studies by Stevens (1983) clarified that these tropical specimens actually represent a separate but related complex comprising species such as R. pacifica and R. nervulosa with their respective varieties. True R. farinacea is predominantly a temperate species, though it has been documented at higher elevations (above 600 m) in otherwise tropical regions such as Puerto Rico, Hawaii, and the Canary Islands. This taxonomic reassessment has helped define more accurate geographical and morphological boundaries for the species, though chemical variation within R. farinacea itself remains complex, with several distinct chemotypes recognised throughout its range.

== Description ==
Ramalina farinacea typically grows 3–6 cm long, though it can reach up to 10 cm in some specimens. It forms tufted, hanging structures that originate from a clearly defined holdfast (attachment point). The lichen often divides into numerous flattened branches measuring up to 3 mm in width, which may occasionally appear slightly concave. Its colour ranges from yellow-green to dark grey-green.

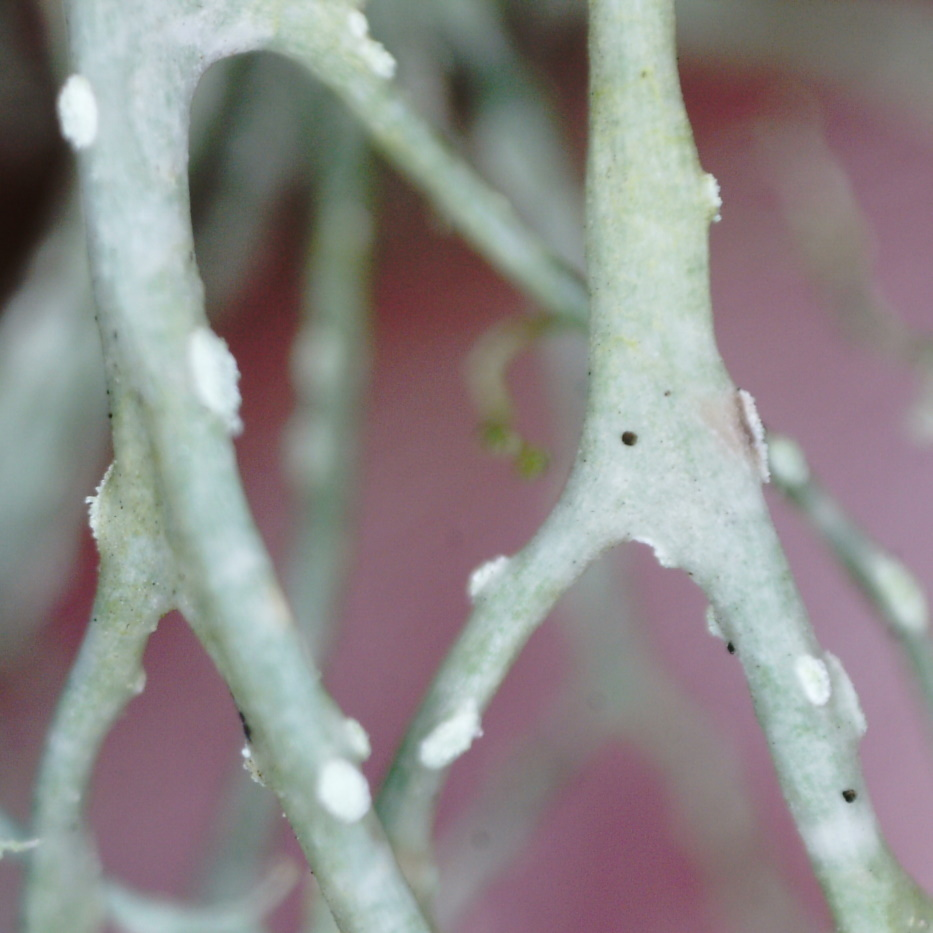
Close-up of the flattened branches, showing the pale marginal soralia characteristic of the species

The surface of Ramalina farinacea is matt and smooth, with a firm texture. Internally, it possesses a solid medulla (inner tissue layer) and a cartilaginous subcortex (supportive layer beneath the outer surface). A distinctive feature of this lichen is its numerous soralia—specialised structures for asexual reproduction—which are located along the margins of the branches. These soralia are discrete, circular to elliptical, saucer-shaped when young, and become flat with maturity. They produce fine, powdery soredia (reproductive propagules) measuring 20–30 μm in diameter that are pale yellow-green in colour.

Sexual reproductive structures called apothecia are rarely observed and, when present, develop laterally on the branches. The ascospores (spores produced in sacs called asci) are broadly ellipsoidal and measure 8–15 by 5–7 μm.

Chemically, Ramalina farinacea has four distinct chemotypes (chemical variants), all containing usnic acid in the medulla and soralia. These chemotypes can be distinguished by their chemical reactions: some show orange-brown or orange-red reactions with chemical tests (containing protocetraric acid), others display yellow-red or yellow-orange reactions (containing salazinic acid, sometimes with norstictic acid), some fluoresce blue-white under ultraviolet light (containing hypoprotocetraric acid), while others show no distinctive chemical reactions.

=== Photobionts ===
A 2010 study of Spanish populations found that thalli of Ramalina farinacea can contain two distinct Trebouxia photobionts within the same thallus. On the basis of plastid LSU rDNA sequences and ultrastructural characters, one of these algae corresponded to Trebouxia jamesii, whereas the other appeared to represent an undescribed species closely related to T. jamesii. Both algae were detected in all sampled thalli from peninsular Spain and Tenerife, suggesting high selectivity in a symbiosis that nonetheless includes two coexisting photobionts.

The same study found a geographical difference in photobiont dominance: the T. jamesii-like alga predominated in peninsular populations, while the second alga predominated in Canary Island material. The authors suggested that this ability to balance different algal partners may help explain the ecological breadth of R. farinacea, although they also noted that additional sampling and markers would be needed to confirm the pattern.

== Similar species ==
Ramalina farinacea can be confused with several related species within the genus Ramalina, particularly those in tropical and subtropical regions. The most similar tropical counterparts include R. pacific and R. nervulosa (with their respective varieties), which were historically misidentified as R. farinacea. These tropical species can be distinguished by several key characteristics:

Ramalina farinacea typically possesses a more loosely woven, arachnoid (spider web-like) medulla compared to the densely compacted medullary hyphae found in the tropical species. The branches of R. farinacea are generally less flattened and compressed than those of its tropical relatives. In subtropical regions, specimens of R. pacifica from New Zealand and Japan exhibit a smooth, bony-textured cortex that resembles R. farinacea, but differ in their chemical composition.

The distinctive "nervulose" markings—longitudinal striations and pseudocyphellae on the thallus surface—are often present in tropical species but less pronounced or absent in typical R. farinacea. While the shape of soralia (reproductive structures) is similar across these species, their distribution and prominence on the thallus can vary.

Chemically, R. farinacea contains usnic acid in the cortex and various medullary substances (protocetraric acid, salazinic acid, or occasionally no medullary substances), while the tropical species contain different combinations of depsides or depsidones, such as divaricatic and stenosporic acids (R. nervulosa) or salazinic acid (R. pacifica).

In field settings, R farinacea is primarily a temperate species, though it may appear at higher elevations in tropical regions. By contrast, species like R. pacifica and R. nervulosa predominantly occupy coastal tropical and subtropical habitats, particularly in mangrove ecosystems. Evernia prunastri may also superficially resemble shade forms of R. farinacea, but the latter can be identified by its tough, cartilaginous subcortex and cylindrical structure with photobiont cells distributed beneath all surfaces.

== Habitat and distribution ==
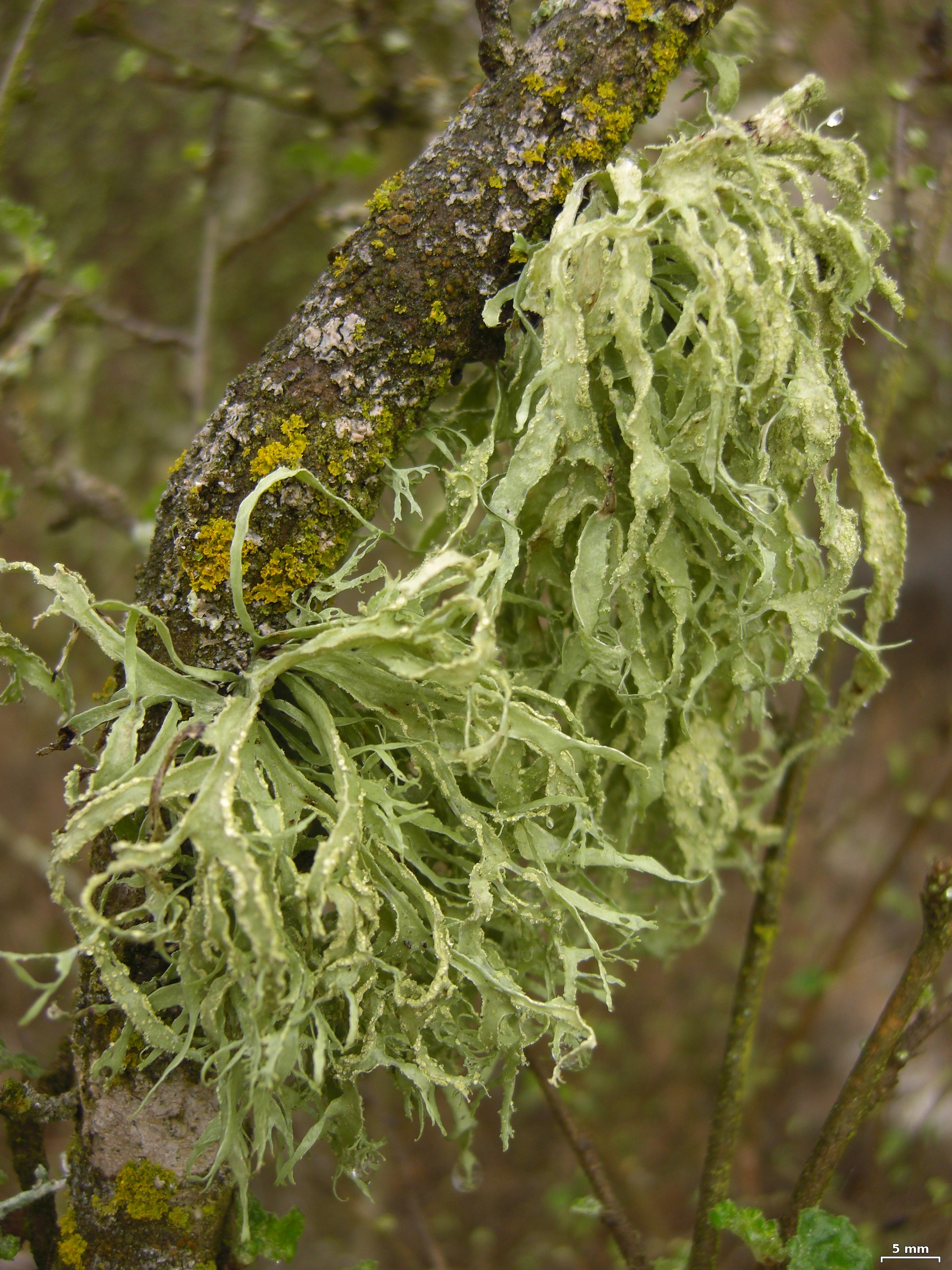
Hanging thalli of Ramalina farinacea on a tree branch at Conejo Mountain, Santa Monica Mountains, southern California

Ramalina farinacea occupies a diverse range of habitats and substrates. It commonly grows on trunks and twigs within shaded deciduous woodlands, but also thrives on sun-exposed, wind-swept isolated trees, hedgerows, and scrub. The species can colonise wooden posts and is occasionally found free-living on sand dunes, though it very rarely occurs on rock surfaces. In North America, it is most abundant along coastal regions from approximately 30–60°N latitude, with several races extending inland. The species shows a strong preference for oceanic climates along both the Atlantic and Pacific coasts. In the United Kingdom, it is found throughout Britain, Ireland, and Wales. In Europe, R. farinacea ranges from the boreal north through the mountains of central and southern Europe into xeric Mediterranean areas, occurring on a variety of shrubs and trees and often in oak forests.

The morphology of Ramalina farinacea shows distinct variation in response to environmental conditions. In air-polluted environments, specimens often develop as dark green, tufted forms with short, decumbent (lying flat), contorted or recurved branches. By contrast, in deeply shaded woodland settings, the lichen typically grows more elongated and pale in colour, with sparse, narrow branching patterns. These shade forms may superficially resemble Evernia prunastri, but can be distinguished by their tough, cartilaginous subcortex (the layer beneath the outer surface) and their terete (cylindrical) structure with photobiont cells (the algal partner cells) distributed beneath all surfaces. Morphological features in this species are largely responses to microenvironmental conditions of substrate and climate rather than chemical composition. Research has shown that specific substrates or habitats often have characteristic branch widths and morphologies, with coastal localities typically having thinner-branched thalli than inland localities.

Among Ramalina species, R. farinacea demonstrates considerable tolerance to environmental pollutants. It is the least sensitive member of its genus to sulphur dioxide pollution (withstanding concentrations below 60 μg per cubic metre) and can also endure wind-blown inorganic fertilisers that might prove toxic to other lichen species. This environmental resilience contributes to its status as a common lichen throughout its range. The species shows distinct substrate preferences that vary by chemical race and geographic region. For example, in North America, the protocetraric acid race dominates populations on coastal and inland oaks (80–90%), while other chemical races compose major proportions of populations on alders in adjacent localities. A latitudinal gradient has been observed in the distribution of chemical races, with the hypoprotocetraric acid race becoming more frequent northward.

While typically sterile, fertile specimens with apothecia do occur in some populations at rates ranging from zero to 14%. These fertile plants are usually found on tree trunks rather than on crown branches, and are typically large thalli in well-established populations from favourable, localized mesic habitats.

== See also ==
- List of lichens named by Carl Linnaeus
- List of Ramalina species
