= Xanthoparmelia evernica =

Scientific classification
- Kingdom: Fungi
- Division: Ascomycota
- Class: Lecanoromycetes
- Order: Lecanorales
- Family: Parmeliaceae
- Genus: Xanthoparmelia
- Species: X. evernica

Binomial name
- Xanthoparmelia evernica Hale (1986)

Species of lichen

Xanthoparmelia evernica is a species of saxicolous (rock-dwelling), foliose lichen in the family Parmeliaceae. Found in South Africa, it was formally described as a new species in 1986 by the American lichenologist Mason Hale. The type specimen was collected from Laguneberg Mountain (district Omaruru, Namibia. The lichen has a somewhat dark yellow-green thallus measuring 3–5 cm (1.2–2.0 in) broad, comprising more or less linear lobes that are 0.3–1 mm wide. The large, hollow, spherical isidia are a characteristic feature of this lichen. It contains evernic acid and usnic acid, and trace amounts of lecanoric acid.

== See also ==
- List of Xanthoparmelia species
