= Xanthoparmelia lagunebergensis =

Scientific classification
- Kingdom: Fungi
- Division: Ascomycota
- Class: Lecanoromycetes
- Order: Lecanorales
- Family: Parmeliaceae
- Genus: Xanthoparmelia
- Species: X. lagunebergensis

Binomial name
- Xanthoparmelia lagunebergensis Hale (1986)

Species of lichen-forming fungus

Xanthoparmelia lagunebergensis is a species of saxicolous (rock-dwelling), foliose lichen in the family Parmeliaceae. Found in Namibia, it was formally described as a new species in 1986 by the American lichenologist Mason Hale. The type specimen was collected from the Laguneberg Mountains (Omaruru Constituency). The thallus of the lichen, which is closely attached to its rock substrate, is yellowish-green and reaches 2–4 cm (0.8–1.6 in) in diameter. It contains protocetraric acid and usnic acid.

== See also ==
- List of Xanthoparmelia species
