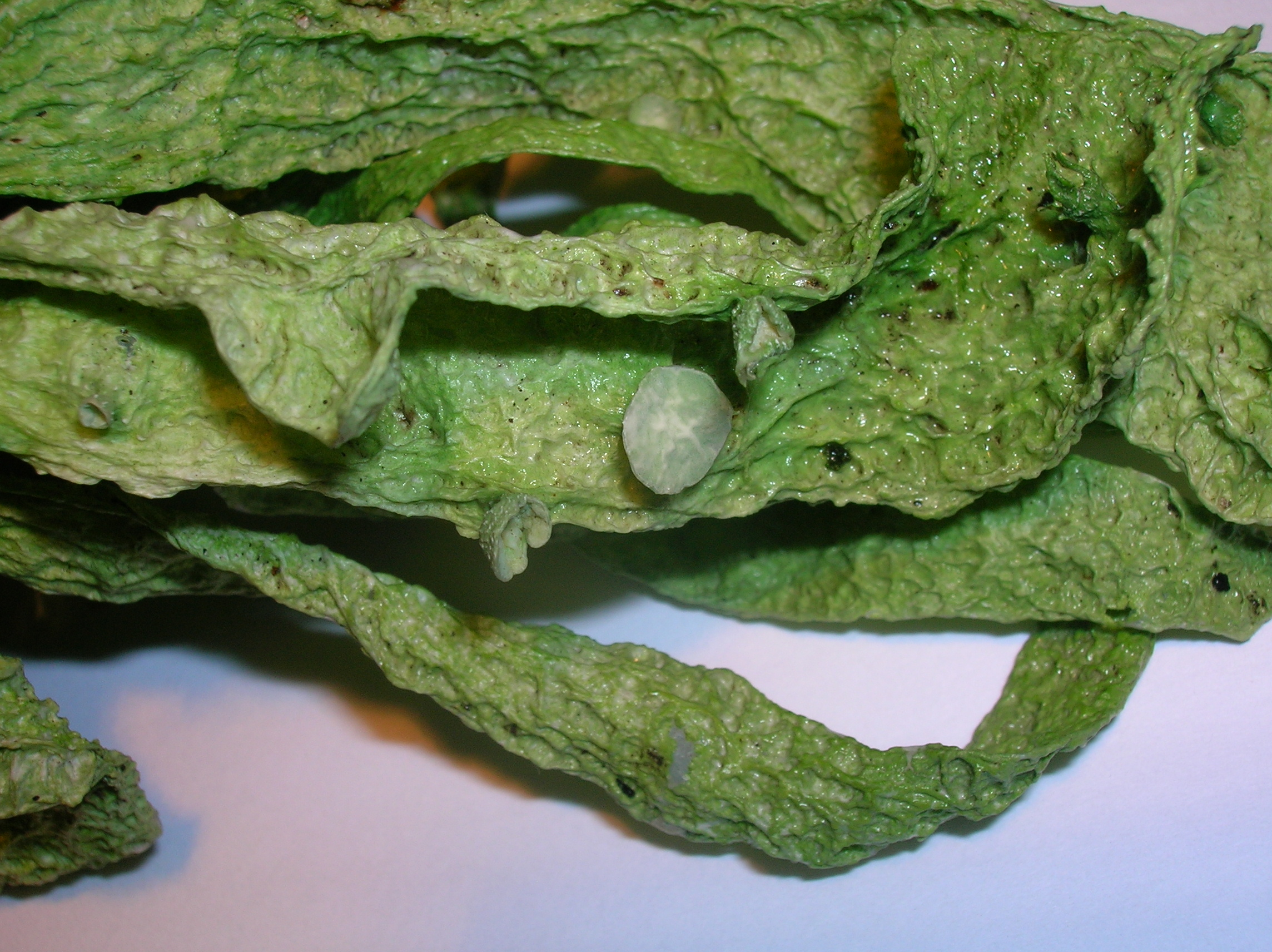
- Ramalina fraxinea growing in Eglinton Country Park, Scotland. Note the stalked apothecia.

Scientific classification
- Kingdom: Fungi
- Division: Ascomycota
- Class: Lecanoromycetes
- Order: Lecanorales
- Family: Ramalinaceae
- Genus: Ramalina
- Species: R. fraxinea

Binomial name
- Ramalina fraxinea (L.) Ach. (1814)

Synonyms
- Lichen fraxineus L.; Ramalina fraxinea f. ampliata (Ach.) Anders; Ramalina fraxinea subsp. calicariformis (Nyl.) de Lesd. (1954); Ramalina fraxinea var. ampliata (Ach.) Ach. (1810); Ramalina fraxinea var. calicariformis Nyl. (1870); Ramalina fraxinea var. calicaris (L.) Schaer.

= Ramalina fraxinea =

Species of lichen-forming fungus

Ramalina fraxinea, the cartilage lichen, is a fruticose lichen with erect or pendulous thalli and branches that are flattened. Colour varies from pale green though yellow-grey to white-grey; apothecia are frequent and soralia may also be present.

== Habitat and distribution ==
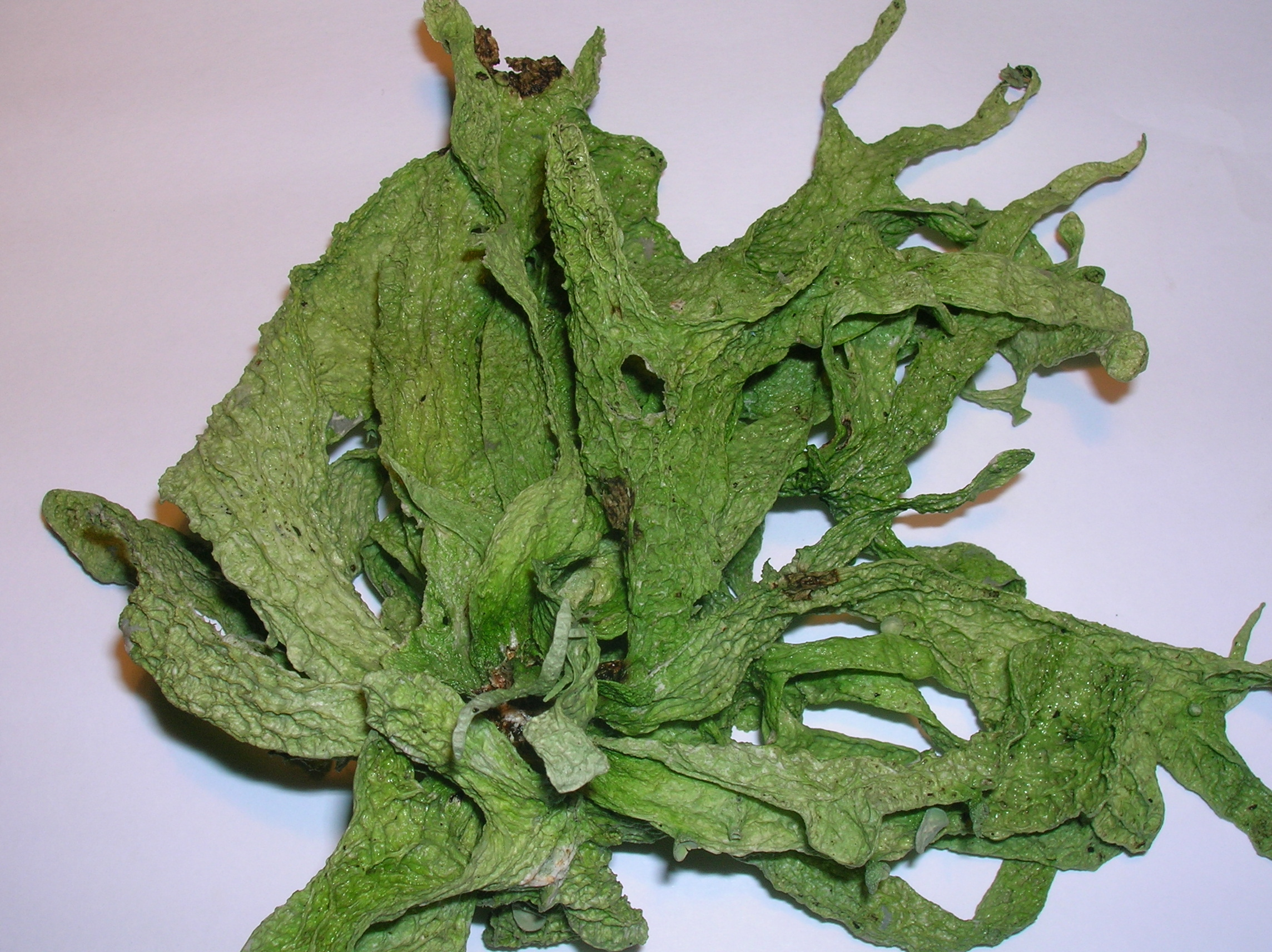
Detail of thallus upper surface.

This lichen is widespread in the United Kingdom, being found on tree bark. In north-eastern England and eastern Scotland it is often well developed, growing up to 12 cm with thongs of up to 2 cm wide. In less favourable areas it is much smaller. The species has declined markedly since the mid 20th century and is now rare or absent in many UK areas. Its sensitivity to air pollution and fertilizer enrichment may be reasons for the decline. It is mainly found on the bark of Acer, Fraxinus, Populus, Tilia and Ulmus; it has been found growing on Rhododendron and oak.

It has been recorded in Netherlands, Spain, Belgium, Luxembourg, France, England, Scotland, Hungary, Norway and Latvia. The species has been widely recorded in the United States of America.

Ramalina fraxinea likes windy, exposed and well-lit sites and it is found on species with nutrient-rich bark. The species also likes humid or foggy areas near ponds or rivers.

== Structure and appearance ==
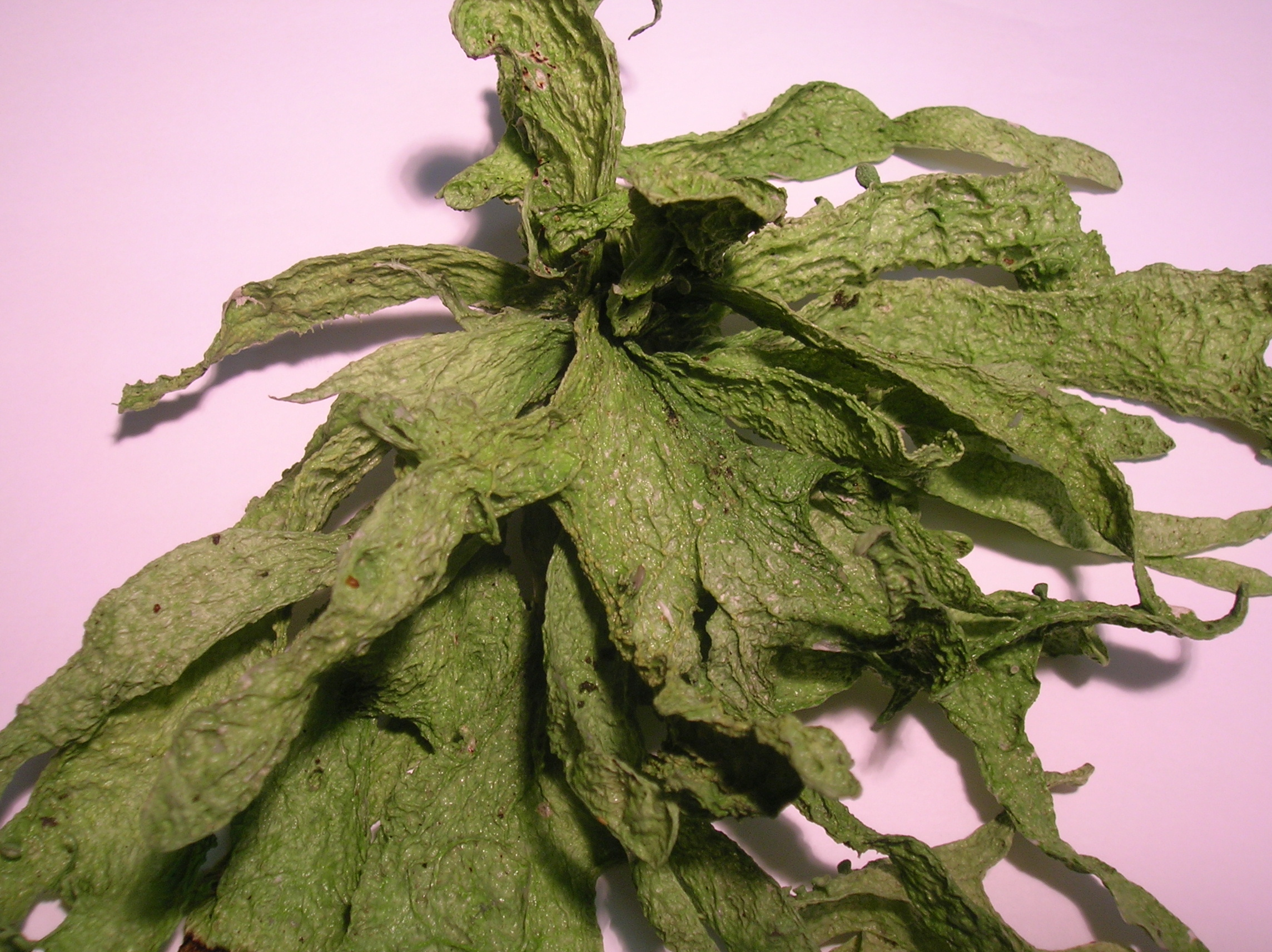
Detail of the thallus under surface.

The Latin word ramas means 'branch'. This genus is a shrubby or fruticose group with erect or pendulous thalli. The branches are flattened and rather stiff. Colour varies from pale green though yellow-grey to white-grey. Apothecia are frequent and soralia may be present. Apothecia are usually concave and often pruinose.

The branches of R. fraxinea have a very distinctive shape, being widest toward the middle (as much as 4.5 cm in some specimens) and tapering at both the point of attachment and toward the tip (to about 1 cm). The thallus is green-grey in colour, pendent and may be as long as 10 cm. It has the overall appearance of being coarsely tufted, individual branches showing a channelled, wrinkled appearance. The branches may have a twist or turn to them. The apothecia are cup-like and convex and are found both along the edges of the branches and on the surface or lamina.

The Ramalinas are also known as 'bush', 'strap', or 'gristle' lichens. They always grow upside-down, and this plant looks like seaweed nailed to a tree.

== Life cycle ==
The spores are kidney-shaped. It does not contain as many apothecia as Ramalina fastigiata. The specimens in the photographs here shown here are very large, but does not have many apothecia, the spore-producing discs. The few that were present were borne on short stalks, and were located on the surface of the lobes, especially near the edges. Ramalina fraxinea is a polycarpic species, so sexual reproduction does not cause the death of the thallus; once apothecia have developed, it can continue producing sexual propagules throughout its lifespan.

== Sensitivity to air pollution ==
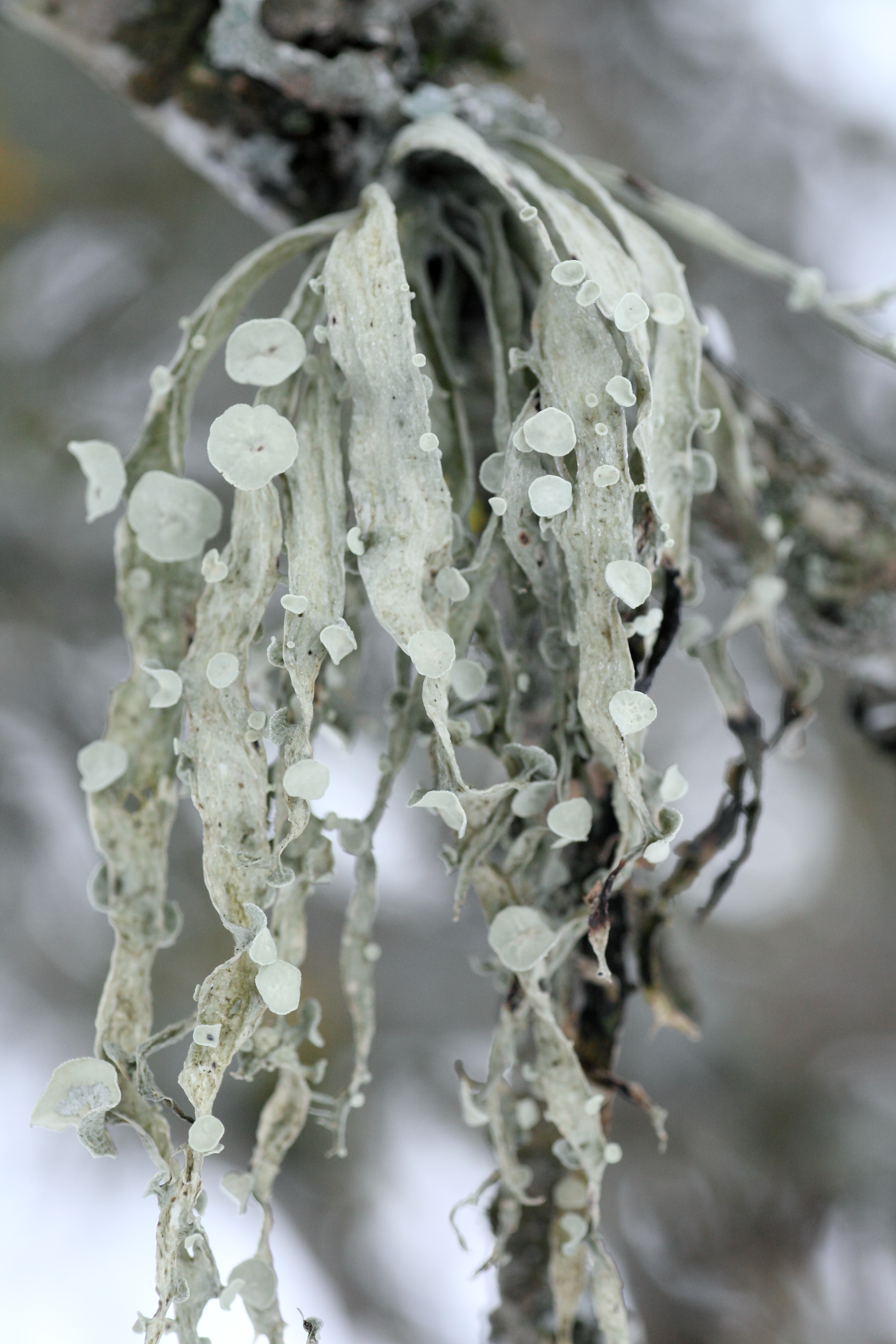

Ramalina fraxinae is very sensitive to air pollution (SO2). It likes windy, exposed and well-lit sites and is found mainly on trees. It was found in Edinburgh in 2008 after an absence since 1797 due to air pollution.

== Uses ==
Ramalina species were at one time dried and ground down to produce a white hair powder and also used as a cure for chilblains. It was also used in making perfumes and in Sweden, northern Europe and northern Russia, R. fraxinea has been used to make brandy. This process was most commonly used with Cladina rangiferina, but several other lichen species have been used.

== See also ==
- List of lichens named by Carl Linnaeus
- List of Ramalina species
