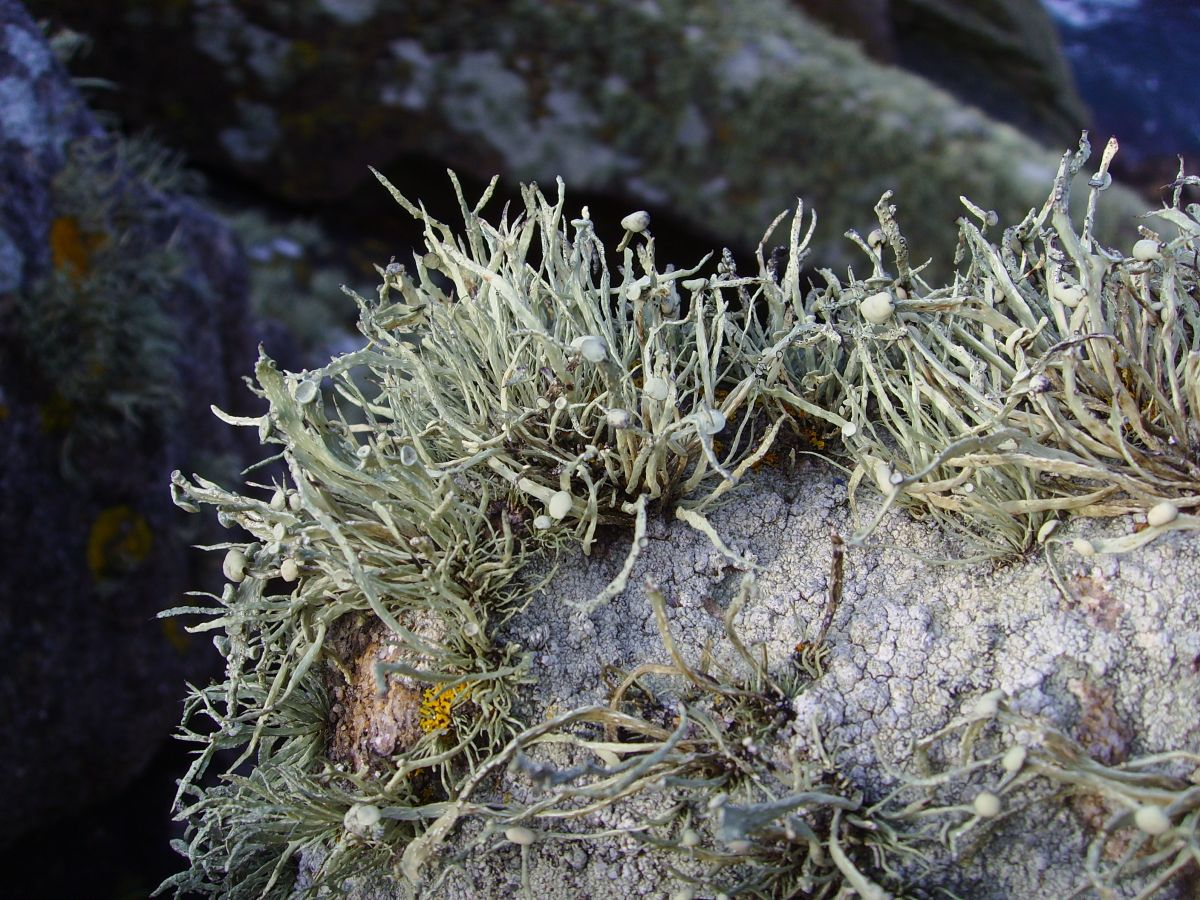

Scientific classification
- Kingdom: Fungi
- Division: Ascomycota
- Class: Lecanoromycetes
- Order: Lecanorales
- Family: Ramalinaceae
- Genus: Ramalina
- Species: R. siliquosa

Binomial name
- Ramalina siliquosa (Huds.) A.L.Sm. (1918)

Synonyms
- Lichen siliquosus Huds. (1762)

= Ramalina siliquosa =

Species of lichen-forming fungus

Ramalina siliquosa, also known as sea ivory, is a tufted and branched lichen which is widely found on siliceous rocks and stone walls on coastlands round the British Isles, occasionally slightly inland. It grows well above the high-tide mark but is still very tolerant of salt spray. The branches are flattened and grey, and bear disc-like spore-producing bodies. It forms part of the diet of sheep in Shetland and on the coast of North Wales. It is found in Iceland where it has a conservation status of a vulnerable species.

== Taxonomy ==
The species was originally described as Lichen siliquosus by the botanist William Hudson in 1762. It was transferred to the genus Ramalina by Annie Lorrain Smith in 1918.

Ramalina siliquosa is part of a complex of closely related lichen species that grow on maritime cliffs in Europe and East Asia. Molecular phylogenetics analysis has revealed that this complex comprises three distinct evolutionary lineages:

- Ramalina siliquosa sensu stricto – Found in Europe, includes the hypoprotocetraric, protocetraric and salazinic acid chemotypes.
- Ramalina cuspidata – Also found in Europe, includes the norstictic and stictic acid chemotypes.
- Ramalina semicuspidata – Found in Japan and Korea, includes four chemotypes (salazinic, divaricatic, protocetraric, and acid-deficient).

The European species R. siliquosa and R. cuspidata show distinct zonation patterns on cliffs, with different chemotypes occupying different vertical zones. This zonation is not observed in the East Asian R. semicuspidata.

Contrary to previous hypotheses, R. siliquosa and R. cuspidata are not closely related "sibling species", but represent separate evolutionary lineages. The chemical variation and zonation patterns in this complex appear to be a result of parallel or convergent evolution rather than recent speciation.

== See also ==
- List of Ramalina species
