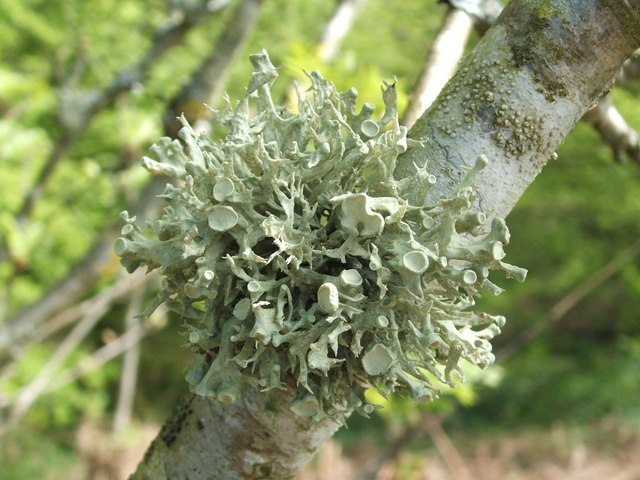

Scientific classification
- Kingdom: Fungi
- Division: Ascomycota
- Class: Lecanoromycetes
- Order: Lecanorales
- Family: Ramalinaceae
- Genus: Ramalina
- Species: R. fastigiata

Binomial name
- Ramalina fastigiata (Pers.) Ach. (1810)

Synonyms
- Lichen fastigiatus Pers. (1794)

= Ramalina fastigiata =

Species of lichen-forming fungus

Ramalina fastigiata is a species of fruticose lichen in the family Ramalinaceae. It is a common species found in Asia, Europe, and North America.

== Taxonomy ==
The lichen was first formally described in 1794 by Christiaan Hendrik Persoon as Lichen fastigiatus. Erik Acharius transferred it to the genus Ramalina in his 1810 publication Lichenographia universalis.

== Research ==
Ramalina fastigiata is sensitive to air pollution and has been used in several studies as a biomonitor of atmospheric pollution.

== See also ==
- List of Ramalina species
