= Evernic acid =

Names
- IUPAC name 2-hydroxy-4-(2-hydroxy-4-methoxy-6-methylbenzoyl)oxy-6-methylbenzoic acid
- Other names NSC 81164

Identifiers
CAS Number	537-09-7
3D model (JSmol)	Interactive image
ChEBI	CHEBI:111284
ChEMBL	ChEMBL1484978
ChemSpider	10372
ECHA InfoCard	100.007.873
EC Number	208-658-2
PubChem CID	10829
UNII	2EQ5W5403J
CompTox Dashboard (EPA)	DTXSID20201956
- InChI: InChI=1S/C17H16O7/c1-8-5-11(7-12(18)14(8)16(20)21)24-17(22)15-9(2)4-10(23-3)6-13(15)19/h4-7,18-19H,1-3H3,(H,20,21); Key: GODLCSLPZIBRMG-UHFFFAOYSA-N
- SMILES: CC1=CC(=CC(=C1C(=O)OC2=CC(=C(C(=C2)C)C(=O)O)O)O)OC

Properties
Chemical formula	C_{17}H_{16}O_{7}
Molar mass	332.308 g·mol^{−1}
- Except where otherwise noted, data are given for materials in their standard state (at 25 °C [77 °F], 100 kPa). Infobox references

Evernic acid is an organic compound and depside with the molecular formula C_{17}H_{16}O_{7}. Evernic acid was first isolated from the lichen Usnea longissima. Evernic acid is soluble in hot alcohol and poorly soluble in water. Evernic acid is produced by the lichens Ramalina, Evernia, and Hypogymnia.
