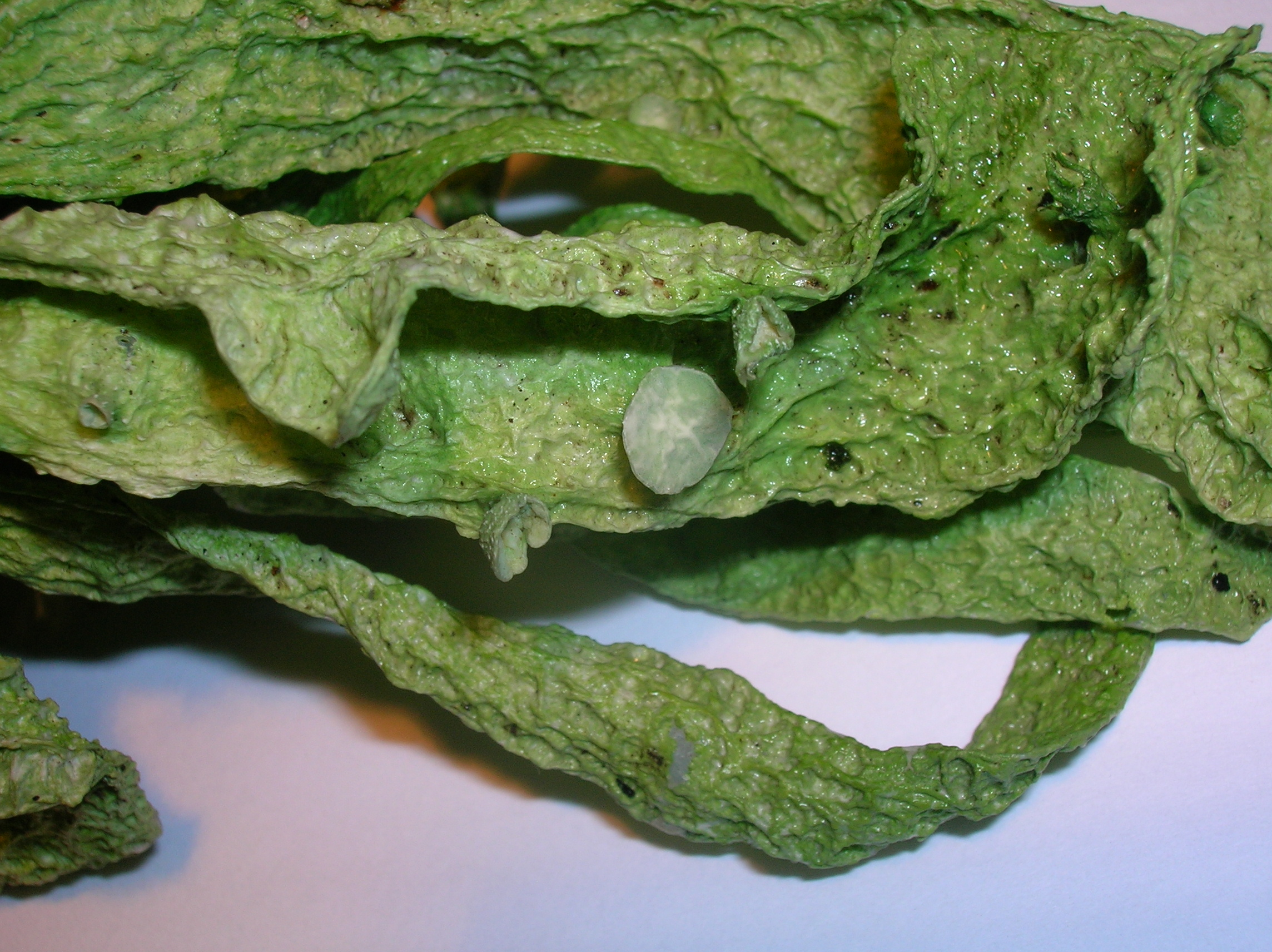
- Ramalina fraxinea

Scientific classification
- Kingdom: Fungi
- Division: Ascomycota
- Class: Lecanoromycetes
- Order: Lecanorales
- Family: Ramalinaceae
- Genus: Ramalina; Ach. (1809)

Type species
- Ramalina fraxinea (L.) Ach. (1810)

Species
- About 280

Synonyms
- Alectoriopsis Elenkin (1929); Chlorodictyon J.Agardh (1870); Dievernia M.Choisy (1931); Fistulariella Bowler & Rundel (1977); Platisma P.Browne ex Adans. (1763); Platysma Hill (1773); Ramalinomyces E.A.Thomas ex Cif. & Tomas. (1953); Trichoramalina Rundel & Bowler (1974)

= Ramalina =

Genus of lichen-forming fungi

Ramalina is a genus of greenish fruticose lichens that grow in the form of flattened, strap-like branches. Members of the genus are commonly called strap lichens or cartilage lichens. Apothecia are lecanorine.

It is in the family Ramalinaceae and in the suborder Lecanorineae.

== Description ==
The genus Ramalina consists of shrubby (fruticose) lichens that often appear tufted, ranging from erect to hanging (pendulous) forms. The lobes of the thallus, which is the body of the lichen, typically emerge from a well-defined or more spread-out holdfast—a structure that anchors the lichen to its substrate. In rare cases, these lichens can be free-living, unattached to any surface. The branches within the thallus can vary from singular to many, and their branching pattern may be either regularly forked (dichotomous) or more irregular. These branches are commonly compressed and strap-shaped, although they can occasionally be rounded or symmetrical when viewed in cross-section. Some species may have channels, and a few can even develop window-like openings (fenestrations) or small, wart-like structures called papillae. In addition, the surface may be smooth or display ridges.

The outer layer of the thallus, the cortex, is typically thin and sometimes indistinct. Beneath the cortex lies a well-developed, cylindrical layer of interwoven fungal filaments hyphae), which is absent in species like Ramalina lacera. The inner side of this layer is often invaded by the photobiont layer, where the symbiotic algae reside. The algal partner in Ramalina lichens belongs to the trebouxioid group. The medulla, a loosely packed layer of hyphae beneath the photobiont, is usually airy and web-like (arachnoid) but can be denser or even absent in hollow branches.

Soralia—structures that produce asexual reproductive granules—are commonly found in Ramalina species. These granules can sometimes resemble tiny isidia, which are small, vegetative reproductive outgrowths. The reproductive structures where sexual reproduction occurs (apothecia), are usually short-stalked and located at or near the tips of the branches, often on the curved sections. The apothecia may range from concave to flat or convex as they age, with disc colours varying from pale yellow to pale green, brown, or pinkish-yellow, and sometimes covered with a white powdery coating (pruina). The edge of the apothecium, called the thalline margin, is usually present and may persist or become almost unnoticeable over time.

The asci, which are the spore-producing cells within the apothecia, are elongated and club-shaped, typically containing eight spores. These spores are one-septate, meaning they have a single division, and are broadly ellipsoidal or kidney-shaped, remaining colourless. Ramalina also produces asexual reproductive structures called pycnidia, which are tiny, flask-shaped bodies with an opening (ostiole) that may be pale or darkened. The cells within these pycnidia that generate conidia (asexual spores) are generally cylindrical, and the conidia themselves are rod-shaped, colourless, and without internal divisions (aseptate).

Chemically, Ramalina lichens often contain usnic acid, a compound that gives them a yellowish-green hue, along with various other substances, including depsides, depsidones, and aliphatic compounds. Lichen spot tests on the cortex are K−, C−, KC+ dark yellow, and P−.

== Photobionts ==
Studies of photobiont diversity in Ramalina species have shown that they primarily associate with green algae from the genus Trebouxia. Research on Macaronesian Ramalina species found that they commonly partner with Trebouxia sp. TR9, which appears well-adapted to the higher temperatures and light intensities of these Atlantic islands. While multiple algal partners can coexist within a single lichen thallus, typically one photobiont species strongly dominates, accounting for over 90% of the algal cells present. The identity and relative abundance of photobionts appears to be more strongly influenced by geographic location and local climate than by the particular Ramalina species involved. This suggests that Ramalina fungi tend to associate with locally adapted photobionts rather than maintaining exclusive partnerships with specific algal species. Studies of R. farinacea have found that young thalli often contain more diverse algal communities compared to mature specimens, indicating that photobiont selection may be an ongoing process during lichen development.

== Distribution ==
The genus has a widespread distribution. A 2008 estimate placed more than 240 species in Ramalina. As of February 2026, Species Fungorum (in the Catalogue of Life) accepts 281 species of Ramalina.

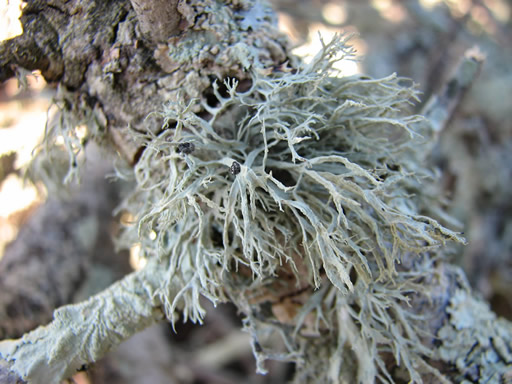
Ramalina farinacea

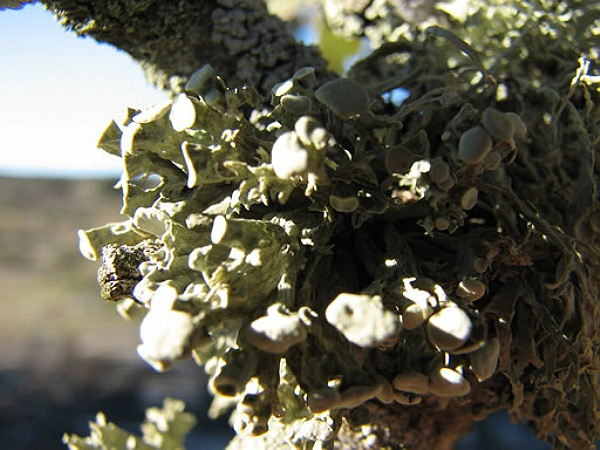
Ramalina fastigiata

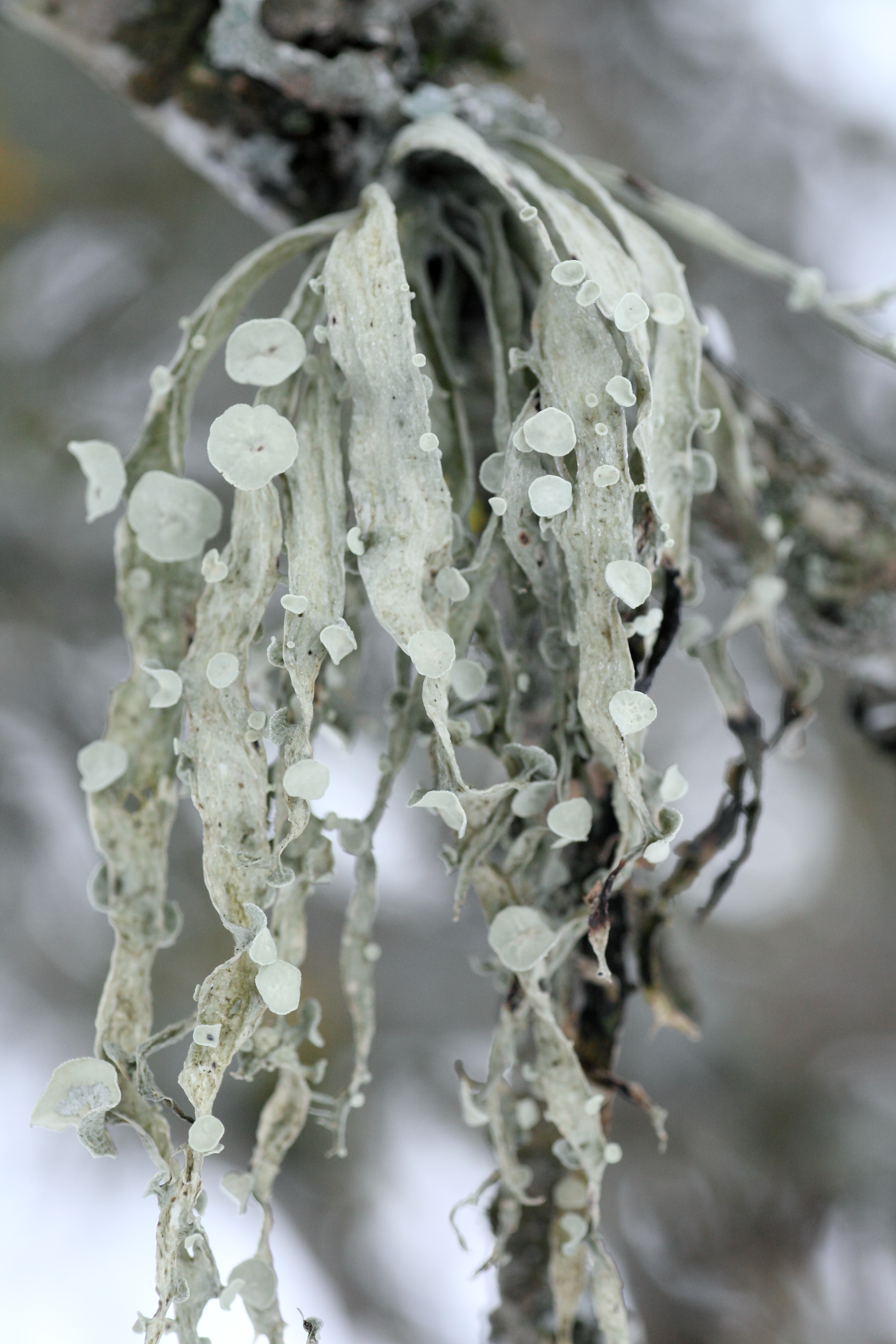
Ramalina fraxinea

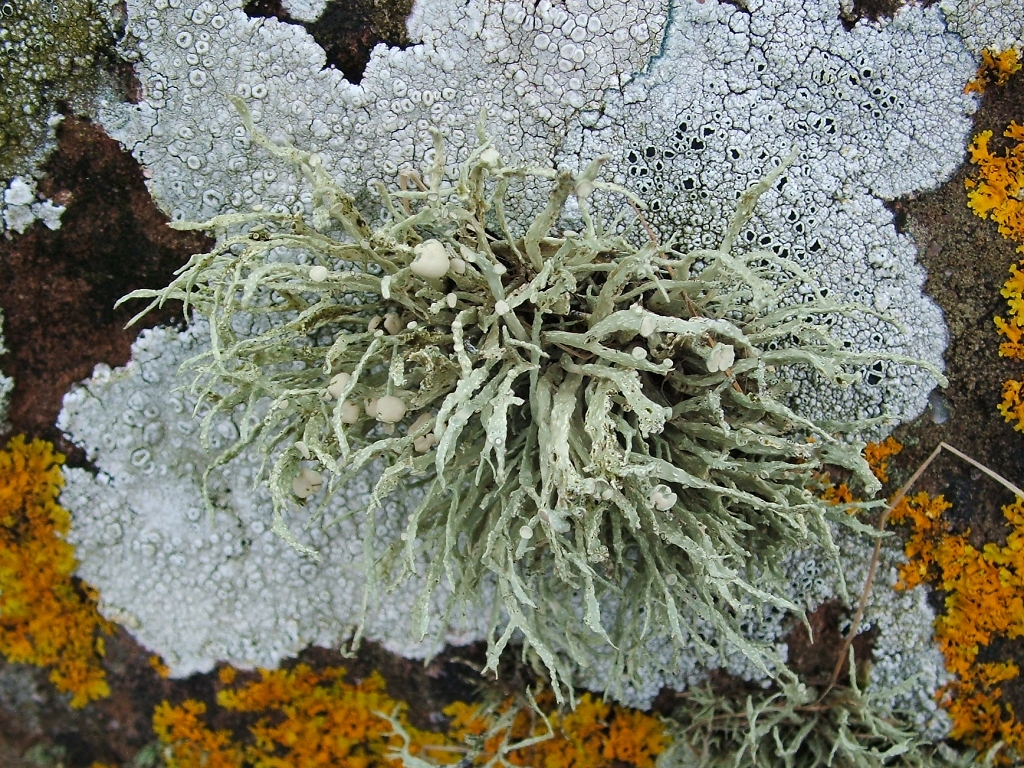
Ramalina siliquosa (with crustose lichen around it)

== See also ==
- List of Ramalina species
