= List of fungi of South Africa – R =

This is an alphabetical list of fungal taxa as recorded from South Africa. Currently accepted names have been appended.

== Ra ==
Genus: Radulum Fr. 1825, accepted as Xenotypa Petr., (1955)

- Radulum javanicum (Henn.) Lloyd 1915 accepted as Erythricium salmonicolor (Berk. & Broome) Burds., (1985)
- Radulum lirellosum Lloyd.
- Radulum mirabile Berk. & Broome 1873 accepted as Lopharia cinerascens (Schwein.) G. Cunn., (1956)
- Radulum orbiculare Fr. 1825 accepted as Xylodon radula (Fr.) Ţura, Zmitr., Wasser & Spirin, (2011)

Genus: Ramalina Ach. 1809 (Lichens)

- Ramalina angulosa Laurer ex Th. Fr. 1861 accepted as Ramalina australiensis Nyl., (1870)
- Ramalina arabum (Dill. ex Ach.) Meyen & Flot. 1843
- Ramalina australiensis Nyl., (1870) reported as Ramalina angulosa Laurer ex Th. Fr. 1861
- Ramalina bourgaeana Mont. ex Nyl. as ''bourgeana'' 1870 accepted as Niebla bourgaeana (Mont. ex Nyl.) Rundel & Bowler [as bourgeana], (1978)
- Ramalina calicaris (L.) Röhl. 1813
- Ramalina calicaris f. ecklonii (Spreng.) Nyl. 1860, accepted as Ramalina ecklonii (Spreng.) Meyen & Flot. [as 'eckloni'], (1843)
- Ramalina capensis var. angulosa Th. Fr. 1861
- Ramalina capensis var. melanothrix (Laurer) Th. Fr. 1861 accepted as Niebla melanothrix (Laurer) Kistenich, Timdal, Bendiksby & S. Ekman, (2018)
- Ramalina celastri (Spreng.) Krog & Swinscow, (1976) reported as Ramalina linearis (Sw.) Ach. 1810
- Ramalina complanata (Sw.) Ach. 1810
- Ramalina cuspidata (Ach.) Nyl. 1870
- Ramalina cuspidata f. implexa H. Olivier 1892
- Ramalina dendriscoides Nyl. 1876
- Ramalina denticulata (Eschw.) Nyl. 1863
- Ramalina duriaei Jatta (sic) possibly (De Not.) Bagl. 1879, accepted as Ramalina lacera (With.) J.R. Laundon, (1984)
- Ramalina ecklonii (Spreng.) Meyen & Flot. 1843
- Ramalina euphorbiae Vain. 1901
- Ramalina evernioides Nyl. 1857
- Ramalina farinacea (L.) Ach. 1810
- Ramalina farinacea var. squarrosa Müll. Arg. 1883 accepted as Ramalina peruviana Ach., (1810)
- Ramalina fastigiata (Pers.) Ach. 1810
- Ramalina fraxinea (L.) Ach. 1810
- Ramalina fraxinea var. fastigiata (Lilj.) Fr. 1826
- Ramalina geniculata Hook. f. & Taylor 1844, accepted as Ramalina inflata (Hook. f. & Taylor) Hook. f. & Taylor, (1845)
- Ramalina geniculata f. tenuis Hue.*
- Ramalina geniculata var. olivacea Müll. Arg. 1879 accepted as Ramalina inflata (Hook. f. & Taylor) Hook. f. & Taylor, (1845)
- Ramalina gracilis (Pers.) Nyl. 1860;
- Ramalina implexa Laur. (sic)possibly (Nyl.) Krog 1994
- Ramalina inflata (Hook. f. & Taylor) Hook. f. & Taylor, (1845) reported as Ramalina geniculata Hook. f. & Taylor 1844,
- Ramalina intermedia (Delise ex Nyl.) Nyl. 1873
- Ramalina lacera (With.) J.R. Laundon, (1984) possibly repoerted as Ramalina duriaei Jatta (sic) possibly (De Not.) Bagl. 1879
- Ramalina lanceolata Nyl. 1870
- Ramalina linearis (Sw.) Ach. 1810 accepted as Ramalina celastri (Spreng.) Krog & Swinscow, (1976)
- Ramalina melanothrix Laurer 1860 accepted as Niebla melanothrix (Laurer) Kistenich, Timdal, Bendiksby & S. Ekman, (2018)
- Ramalina membranacea Laur. possibly Mont. 1839
- Ramalina peruviana Ach., (1810) reported as Ramalina farinacea var. squarrosa Müll. Arg. 1883
- Ramalina pollinaria (Westr.) Ach. 1810
- Ramalina pollinaria f. cariosa Laurer 1870
- Ramalina pusilla Le Prévost ex Duby 1830
- Ramalina scopulorum (Ach.) Ach. 1810 accepted as Ramalina siliquosa (Huds.) A.L. Sm., (1918)
- Ramalina scopulorum var. cornuata (Ach.) Ach. 1810 accepted as Ramalina cuspidata (Ach.) Nyl., (1870)
- Ramalina scopulorum var. humilis Schaer.
- Ramalina scopulorum var. implexa Nyl.
- Ramalina siliquosa (Huds.) A.L. Sm., (1918) reported as Ramalina scopulorum (Ach.) Ach. 1810
- Ramalina subfraxinea Nyl. 1870
- Ramalina usnea (L.) R. Howe 1914
- Ramalina usnea var. capensis (Nyl.) Zahlbr. 1930;
- Ramalina usnea var. contorta (Flot.) Zahlbr. 1930;
- Ramalina usneoides (Ach.) Mont. 1837
- Ramalina usneoides var. capensis Nyl.
- Ramalina usneoides var. contorta Flotow. wccepted as Ramalina usnea (L.) R. Howe 1914
- Ramalina webbii var. capensis A. Massal. 1861
- Ramalina yemensis (Ach.) Nyl. 1870.
- Ramalina yemensis f. fenestralis Stizenb. 1890
- Ramalina yemensis f. sublinearis Nyl. 1870
- Ramalina yemensis f. tenuissima Müll.Arg.*
- Ramalina yemensis var. ecklonii (Spreng.) Vain. 1890
- Ramalina yemensis var. lanceolata Nyl.*
- Ramalina yemensis var. membranacea (Laurer) Nyl. 1870
- Ramalina yemensis var. tenuissima (Meyen & Flot.) Zahlbr. 1930 accep-ted as Ramalina celastri (Spreng.) Krog & Swinscow, (1976)

Genus: Ramularia Unger 1833

- Ramularia areola G.F. Atk. 1890 accepted as Ramularia gossypii (Speg.) Cif., (1962)
- Ramularia gossypii (Speg.) Cif., (1962) reported as Ramularia areola G.F. Atk. 1890
- Ramularia primulae Thüm. 1878
- Ramularia richardiae Kalchbr. & Cooke 1880
- Ramularia rumicis Kalchbr. & Cooke 1880

Genus: Ravenelia Berk. 1853

- Ravenelia atrides Syd. & P. Syd. 1912 accepted as Uredopeltis atrides (Syd. & P. Syd.) A.R. Wood, (2007)
- Ravenelia baumiana Henn. 1903
- Ravenelia bottomleyae Doidge 1927 accepted as Spumula bottomleyae (Doidge) Thirum., (1946)
- Ravenelia deformans (Maubl.) Dietel 1906 accepted as Ravenelia hieronymi Speg., (1881)
- Ravenelia dichrostachydis Doidge 1927,
- Ravenelia elephantorhizae Doidge 1927
- Ravenelia escharoides Syd. & P. Syd. 1912
- Ravenelia evansii Syd. & P. Syd. 1912,
- Ravenelia glabra Kalchbr. & Cooke 1880
- Ravenelia halsei Doidge 1939
- Ravenelia hieronymi Speg., (1881) recorded as Ravenelia deformans (Maubl.) Dietel 1906
- Ravenelia indigoferae Tranzschel ex Dietel 1894
- Ravenelia inornata (Kalchbr.) Dietel 1894
- Ravenelia laevis Dietel & Holw. 1897
- Ravenelia le-testui Maubl., (1906)
- Ravenelia macowaniana Pazschke 1894
- Ravenelia minima Cooke 1882
- Ravenelia modesta Doidge 1939
- Ravenelia munduleae Henn. 1896
- Ravenelia natalensis Syd., P. Syd. & Pole-Evans 1912
- Ravenelia ornamentalis (Kalchbr.) Dietel 1906
- Ravenelia peglerae Pole-Evans 1950
- Ravenelia pienaarii Doidge 1927
- Ravenelia pretoriensis Syd. & P. Syd. 1912
- Ravenelia stictica Berk. & Broome 1873
- Ravenelia tephrosiae Kalchbr. 1886.
- Ravenelia transvaalensis Doidge 1939
- Ravenelia woodii Pazschke 1894,.

== Rh ==
Genus: Rhachomyces Thaxt. 1895

- Rhachomyces dolicaontis Thaxt., [as dolichaontis] (1901)

Genus: Rhinocladium Sacc. & Marchal 1885

- Rhinocladium beurmanni (Matr. & Ramond) Vuill. 1910 accepted as Sporothrix schenckii Hektoen & C.F. Perkins, (1900)

Genus: Rhinosporidium Minchin & Fantham 1905 (Mesomycetozoea) (Protozoa)

- Rhinosporidium kinealyi Minchin & Fantham 1905
- Rhinosporidium seeberi (Wernicke) Seeber 1912
- Rhinosporidium sp.

Genus: Rhinotrichum Corda 1837

- Rhinotrichum curtisii Berk. 1867 accepted as Acladium curtisii (Berk.) M.B. Ellis, (1976)
- Rhinotrichum rubiginosum Lloyd (sic) possibly (Fr.) Sumst. 1911 accepted as Botryobasidium rubiginosum (Fr.) Rossman & W.C. Allen, (2016)

Genus: Rhizina Fr. 1815,

- Rhizina inflata Karst. (sic) possobly (Schaeff.) Quél. 1886
- Rhizina resupinata Lloyd*

Genus: Rhizocarpon Ramond ex DC. 1805 (Lichens)

- Rhizocarpon affine G. Merr.
- Rhizocarpon badioatrum var. alboatrum Malme 1922, accepted as Rhizocarpon richardii (Lamy ex Nyl.) Zahlbr., (1926)
- Rhizocarpon capense Zahlbr. 1936
- Rhizocarpon disporum var. montagnei (Flot.) Zahlbr. 1926, accepted as Rhizocarpon disporum (Nägeli ex Hepp) Müll. Arg., (1879)
- Rhizocarpon geographicum (L.) DC. 1805
- Rhizocarpon geographicum f. atrovirens (L.) A. Massal. 1853 accepted as Rhizocarpon geographicum (L.) DC. 1805
- Rhizocarpon geographicum f. intermedium (Stizenb.) Zahlbr. 1926
- Rhizocarpon montagnei Körb. 1855 accepted as Rhizocarpon disporum (Nägeli ex Hepp) Müll. Arg., (1879)
- Rhizocarpon patellarium (Stizenb.) Zahlbr. 1926
- Rhizocarpon richardii (Lamy ex Nyl.) Zahlbr., (1926) recorded as Rhizocarpon badioatrum var. alboatrum Malme 1922,
- Rhizocarpon viridiatrum (Wulfen) Körb. 1855

Genus: Rhizoctonia DC. 1815

- Rhizoctonia bataticola (Taubenh.) E.J.Butler, (1925), accepted as Macrophomina phaseolina (Tassi) Goid. (1947)
- Rhizoctonia crocorum (Pers.) DC. 1815 accepted as Helicobasidium purpureum (Tul.) Pat. 1885
- Rhizoctonia lamellifera W.Small (1924), accepted as Macrophomina phaseolina (Tassi) Goid. (1947)
- Rhizoctonia solani J.G. Kühn 1858
- Rhizoctonia sp.

Genus: Rhizomyces

- Rhizomyces confusus Thaxt.

Genus: Rhizopogon

- Rhizopogon capfcnsis Lloyd ex Verw.
- Rhizopogon luteolus Fr.
- Rhizopogon niger Zeller & Dodge.
- Rhizopogon pachyphloeus Zeller & Dodge.
- Rhizopogon radicans Lloyd
- Rhizopogon rubescens Tul.

Genus: Rhizopus

- Rhizopus arhizus Fisch.
- Rhizopus artocarpi Racib. (1900), accepted as Rhizopus stolonifer Vuillemin (1902)
- Rhizopus nigricans Ehrenberg (1820), accepted as Rhizopus stolonifer (Ehrenb.) Vuill., (1902)
- Rhizopus stolonifer (Ehrenb.) Vuill., (1902),

Genus: Rhodopaxillus Maire 1913, accepted as Lepista (Fr.) W.G. Sm., (1870)

- Rhodopaxillus caffrorum (Kalchbr. & MacOwan) Singer 1942 accepted as Lepista caffrorum (Kalchbr. & MacOwan) Singer, (1951)

Genus: Rhodotorula F.C. Harrison 1927

- Rhodotorula mucilaginosa (A. Jörg.) F.C. Harrison 1928

Genus: Rhopalospora*

- Rhopalospora caffra Massal.*

Genus: Rhynchosphaeria (Sacc.) Berl. 1890

- Rhynchosphaeria fagarae Doidge 1941

Genus: Rhynchosporium Heinsen ex A.B. Frank 1897,

- Rhynchosporium secalis (Oudem.) Davis 1919

Genus: Rhytisma Fr. 1819

- Rhytisma eugeniacearum Corda 1840
- Rhytisma grewiae Kalchbr. 1880 accepted as Phyllachora grewiae (Kalchbr.) Theiss. & Syd., (1915)
- Rhytisma melianthi Thüm. 1876 accepted as Phyllachora melianthi (Thüm.) Sacc., (1883)
- Rhytisma myricae Mont. 1856
- Rhytisma porrigo Cooke 1882 accepted as Cycloschizon porrigo (Cooke) Arx, (1962)

== Ri ==
Genus: Ricasolia A.Massal. (1855), accepted as Solenopsora A.Massal. (1855) (Lichens)

- Ricasolia crenulata var. stenospora Nyl. 1859
- Ricasolia erosa (Eschw.) Nyl. 1860 accepted as Emmanuelia erosa (Eschw.) Lücking, M. Cáceres & Ant. Simon, (2020)
- Ricasolia patinifera (Taylor) Müll. Arg. 1888 accepted as Emmanuelia patinifera (Taylor) Lücking, M. Cáceres & Ant. Simon, (2020)
- Ricasolia ravenelii (Tuck.) Nyl. 1863 accepted as Emmanuelia ravenelii (Tuck.) Ant. Simon & Goffinet, (2020)
- Ricasolia sublaevis Nyl. 1868

Genus: Rinodina (Ach.) Gray 1821 (Lichens)

- Rinodina aethalea Ach.*
- Rinodina albotincta (sic) Zahlbr. possibly Rinodina albocincta Zahlbr., (1936)
- Rinodina bicolor Zahlbr. 1932
- Rinodina capensis Hampe 1861
- Rinodina confragulosa (sic) Müll.Arg. possibly Rinodina confragosula (Nyl.) Müll. Arg. 1887,
- Rinodina conspersa Müll. Arg. 1889
- Rinodina deminutula (Stizenb.) Zahlbr. 1931
- Rinodina detecta (Stizenb.) Zahlbr. 1931
- Rinodina exigua (Ach.) Gray 1821
- Rinodina ficta (Stizenb.) Zahlbr. 1931
- Rinodina hufferiana (sic) Müll.Arg. probably Rinodina huefferiana Müll. Arg. 1880
- Rinodina huillensis Vain. 1901
- Rinodina microlepida Müll. Arg. 1888
- Rinodina microphthalma A. Massal. 1861
- Rinodina oreina (Ach.) A. Massal. 1852, accepted as Dimelaena oreina (Ach.) Norman, (1852)
- Rinodina roboris (Dufour ex Nyl.) Arnold 1881
- Rinodina sophodes (Ach.) A. Massal. 1852
- Rinodina sophodes var. atroalbida (Nyl.) Zahlbr. 1931 [as atroalba]
- Rinodina sophodes var. ledienii Stein 1888
- Rinodina teichophiloides (Stizenb.) Zahlbr. 1931 accepted as Rinodina blastidiata Matzer & H. Mayrhofer, (1994)

Genus: Rizalia Syd. & P. Syd. 1914

- Rizalia confusa Doidge 1924

== Ro ==
Genus: Roccella DC. 1805 (Lichens)

- Roccella arnoldi Vain. 1901
- Roccella fuciformis (L.) DC., (1805),
- Roccella fucoides (Neck.) Vain. 1901 accepted as Roccella phycopsis Ach., (1810)
- Roccella fucoides var. arnoldi (Vain.) Zahlbr. 1915
- Roccella hereroensis Vain. 1900
- Roccella hypomecha (Ach.) Bory 1828 accepted as Roccellina hypomecha (Ach.) Tehler, (2007)
- Roccella hypomecha var. benguellensis Vain. 1901
- Roccella hypomecha var. isabellina Vain. 1901
- Roccella linearis var. guineensis Vain. 1901
- Roccella linearis var. primaria Vain. 1901
- Roccella mollusca (Ach.) Nyl. 1858 accepted as Combea mollusca (Ach.) Nyl., (1860)
- Roccella montagnei Bél. (1834),
- Roccella mossamedana Vain. 1901
- Roccella phycopsis Ach. (1810),
- Roccella podocarpa Vain. 1901
- Roccella tinctoria DC. 1805 accepted as Roccella phycopsis Ach., (1810)
- Roccella tinctoria f. complanata Vain. 1901
- Roccella tinctoria var. hypomecha (Ach.) Ach. 1810 accepted as Roccellina hypomecha (Ach.) Tehler, (2007)
- Roccella tinctoria var. subpodicellata Vain. 1901

Family: Roccellaceae Chevall. 1826

Genus: Rosellinia De Not. 1844

- Rosellinia aquila (Fr.) Ces. & De Not. 1844
- Rosellinia subiculata (Schwein.) Sacc. 1882
- Rosellinia sp.

Genus: Rosenscheldia Speg. 1885 accepted as Botryosphaeria Ces. & De Not., (1863)

- Rosenscheldia horridula Doidge 1921

== Ru ==
Genus: Russula Pers. 1796

- Russula cyanoxantha (Schaeff.) Fr. 1863
- Russula integra (L.) Fr. 1838
- Russula pectinata Fr. 1838,
- Russula rubra (Lam.) Fr. 1838

== See also ==
- List of bacteria of South Africa
- List of Oomycetes of South Africa
- List of slime moulds of South Africa
- List of fungi of South Africa
  - List of fungi of South Africa – A
  - List of fungi of South Africa – B
  - List of fungi of South Africa – C
  - List of fungi of South Africa – D
  - List of fungi of South Africa – E
  - List of fungi of South Africa – F
  - List of fungi of South Africa – G
  - List of fungi of South Africa – H
  - List of fungi of South Africa – I
  - List of fungi of South Africa – J
  - List of fungi of South Africa – K
  - List of fungi of South Africa – L
  - List of fungi of South Africa – M
  - List of fungi of South Africa – N
  - List of fungi of South Africa – O
  - List of fungi of South Africa – P
  - List of fungi of South Africa – Q
  - List of fungi of South Africa – R
  - List of fungi of South Africa – S
  - List of fungi of South Africa – T
  - List of fungi of South Africa – U
  - List of fungi of South Africa – V
  - List of fungi of South Africa – W
  - List of fungi of South Africa – X
  - List of fungi of South Africa – Y
  - List of fungi of South Africa – Z
