= R. polymorpha =

R. polymorpha may refer to:

- Ramalina polymorpha, a strap lichen
- Rhamnus polymorpha, a flowering plant
- Richterago polymorpha, a Brazilian sunflower
