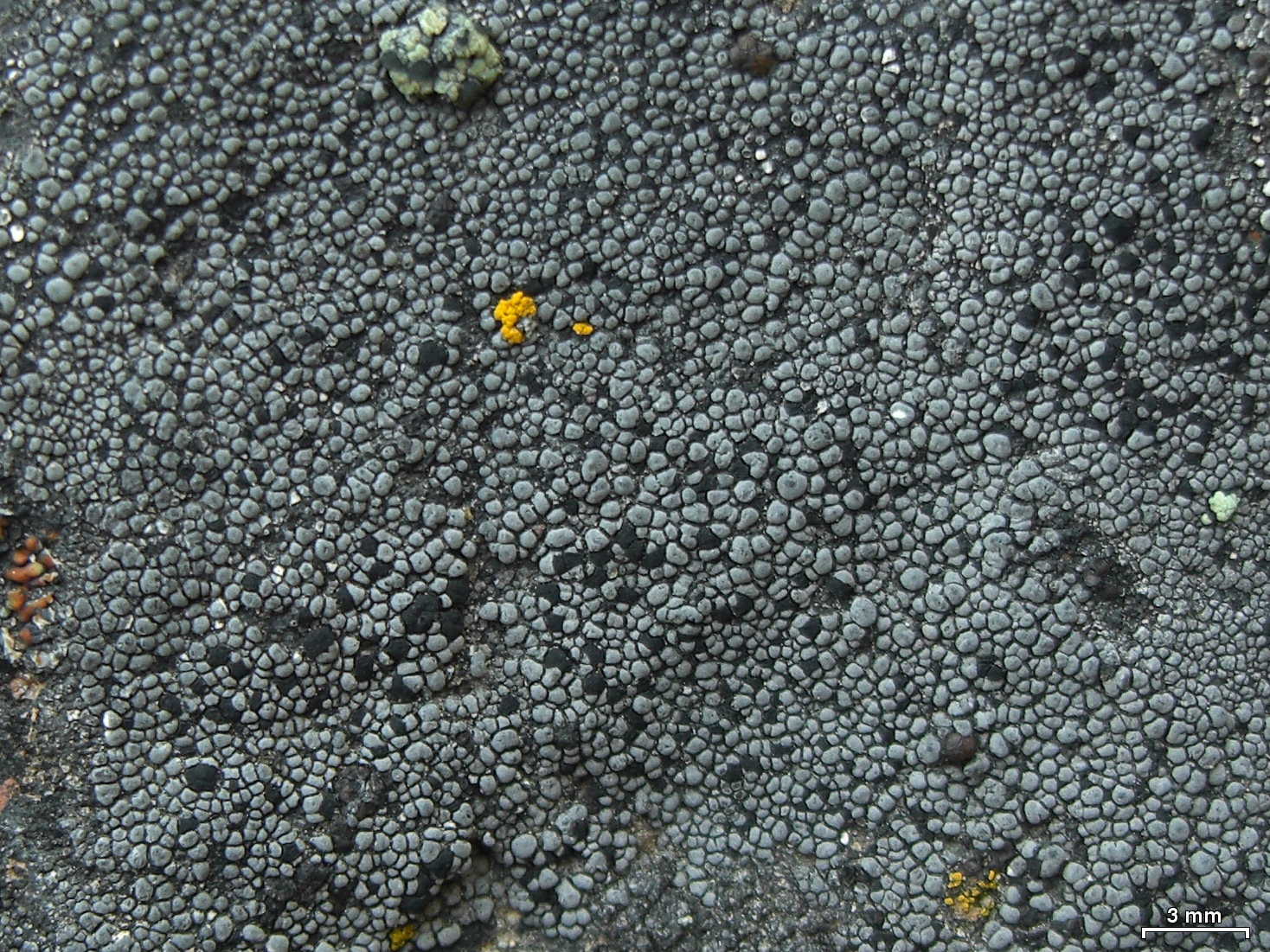

Conservation status
- Apparently Secure (NatureServe)

Scientific classification
- Kingdom: Fungi
- Division: Ascomycota
- Class: Lecanoromycetes
- Order: Rhizocarpales
- Family: Rhizocarpaceae
- Genus: Rhizocarpon
- Species: R. disporum

Binomial name
- Rhizocarpon disporum (Nägeli ex Hepp) Müll.Arg. (1879)

Synonyms
- List: Lecidea dispora Nägeli ex Hepp (1853); Rhizocarpon confervoides A.Massal. (1852); Lecidea confervoides Vain. (1899); Lecidea montagnei Flot. ex Körb. (1855); Rhizocarpon montagnei Flot. ex Körb. (1855); Lecidea geminata var. montagnei (Flot. ex Körb.) Nyl. (1855); Lecidea montagnei (Flot. ex Körb.) Hepp (1857); Buellia montagnei (Flot. ex Körb.) Tuck. (1866); Rhizocarpon petraeum var. montagnei (Flot. ex Körb.) Boistel (1903); Rhizocarpon petraeum subsp. montagnei (Flot. ex Körb.) Fink (1910); Rhizocarpon concretum f. montagnei (Flot. ex Körb.) Vain. (1922); Rhizocarpon disporum var. montagnei (Flot. ex Körb.) Zahlbr. (1926); Rhizocarpon concretum f. confervoides (Vain.) Elenkin (1904)

= Rhizocarpon disporum =

Species of lichen

Rhizocarpon disporum, the single-spored map lichen, is a species of saxicolous (rock-dwelling), crustose lichen in the family Rhizocarpaceae. It has a circumpolar distribution and grows on sun-exposed siliceous rocks. Despite its species epithet, the lichen invariably contains only a single ascospore per ascus. A morphologically similar species, Rhizocarpon geminatum, has two spores per ascus; it is more widely distributed than R. disporum and tends to grow in moister habitats.
