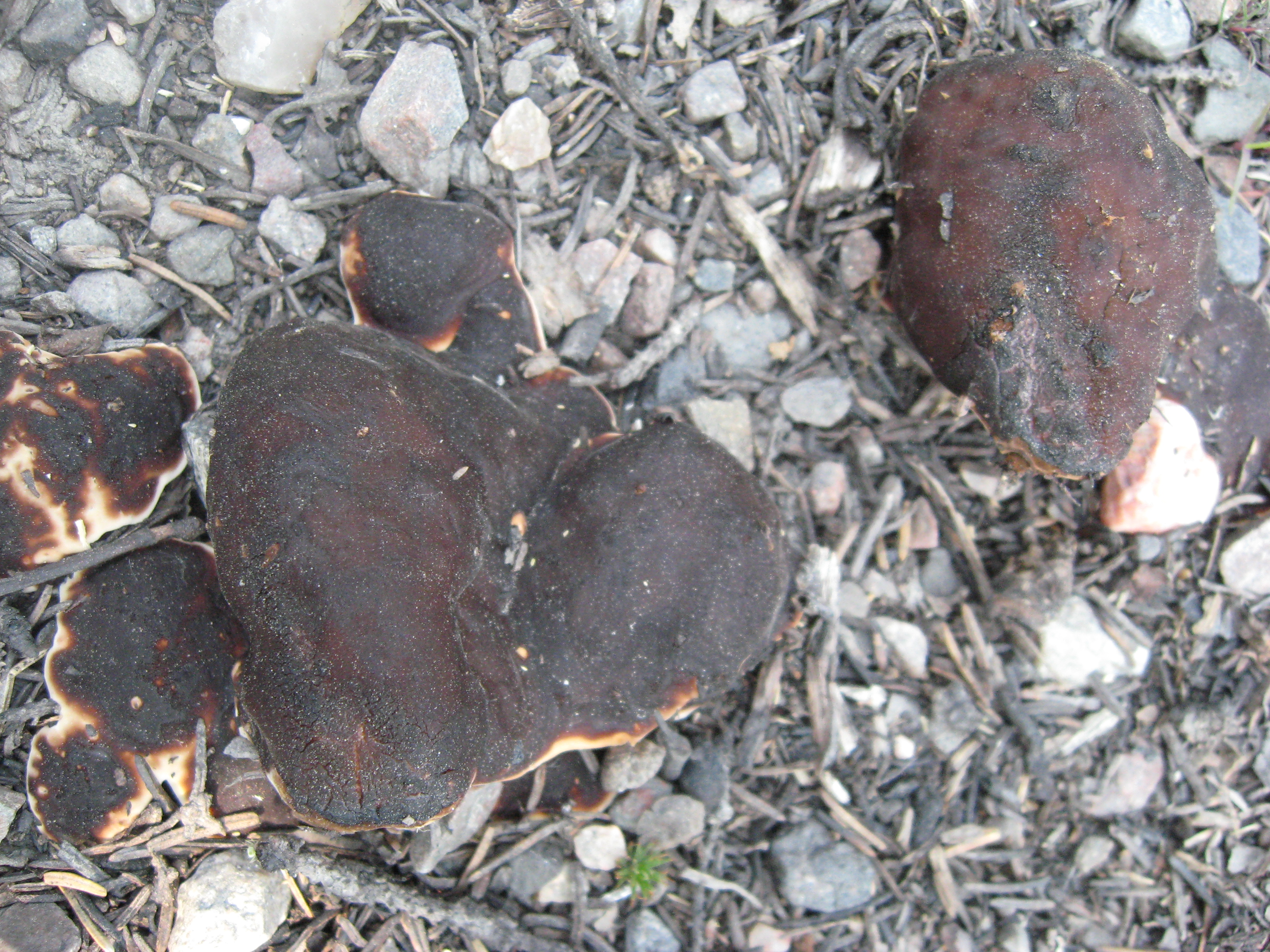
- Rhizina undulata

Scientific classification
- Kingdom: Fungi
- Division: Ascomycota
- Class: Pezizomycetes
- Order: Pezizales
- Family: Rhizinaceae; Bonord. (1851)

Type genus
- Rhizina Fr. (1815)

Genera
- Phymatotrichopsis; Rhizina

= Rhizinaceae =

Family of fungi

The Rhizinaceae are a family of ascomycete fungi in the order Pezizales. The family was circumscribed by German mycologist Hermann Friedrich Bonorden in 1851.
