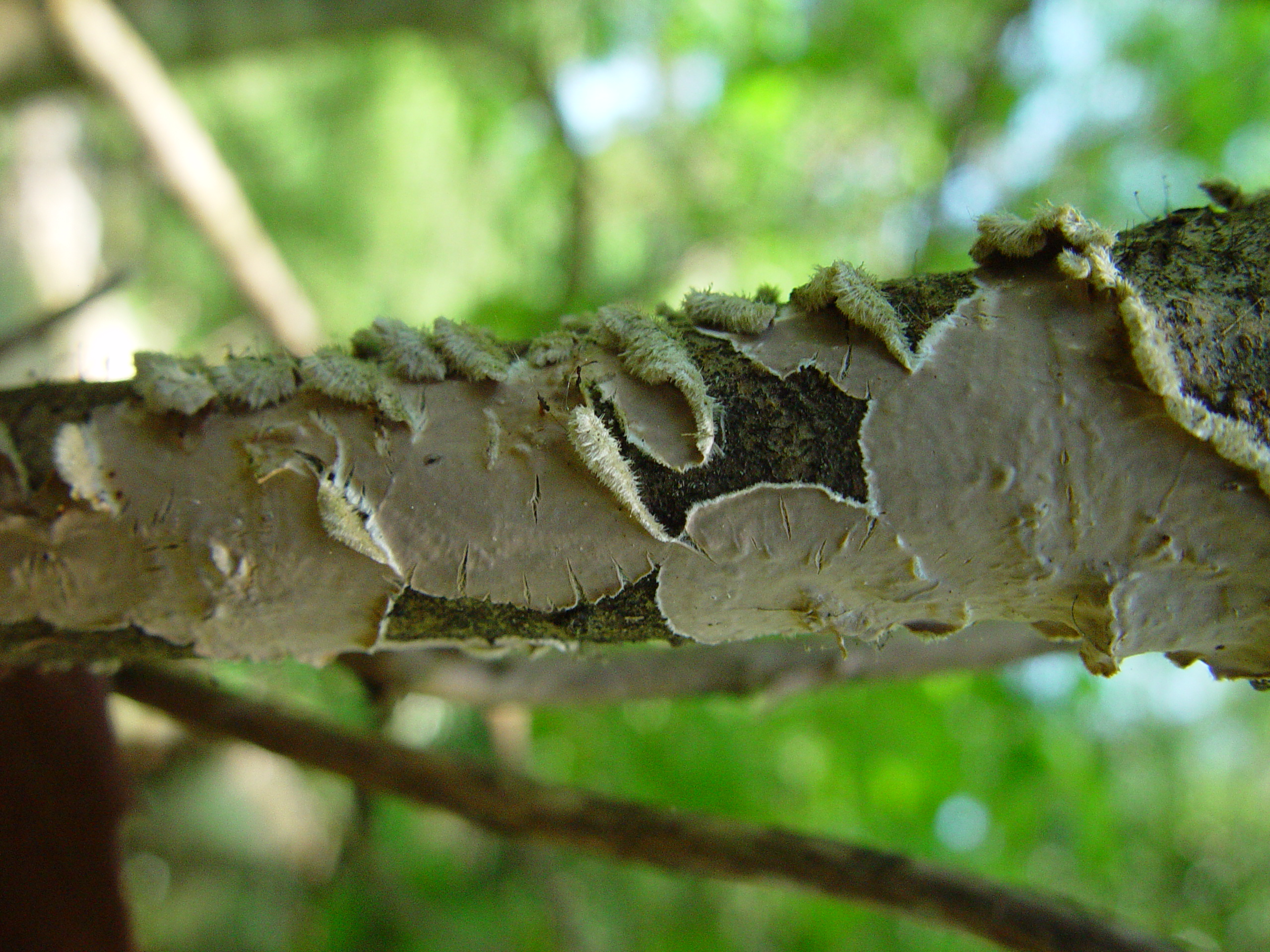
- Fruitbody of the resupinate fungus Lopharia spadicea

Scientific classification
- Domain: Eukaryota
- Kingdom: Fungi
- Division: Basidiomycota
- Class: Agaricomycetes
- Order: Polyporales
- Family: Polyporaceae
- Genus: Lopharia; Kalchbr. & MacOwan (1881)

Type species
- Lopharia lirellosa Kalchbr. & MacOwan (1881)

= Lopharia =

Genus of fungi

Lopharia is a genus of fungi in the family Polyporaceae. The genus was circumscribed by Károly Kalchbrenner and Peter MacOwan in 1881.

== Description ==
Fruit bodies of Lopharia fungi are crust like, to effused-reflexed (like a crust with the edges curled out to form caps). The sterile portion of the crust surface is tomentose, while the spore-bearing surface (the hymenium) is smooth or tuberculate. The colour ranges from greyish-white to cream to pale yellowish.

Lopharia has a dimitic hyphal system, meaning that it contains both generative and skeletal hyphae. The generative hyphae have clamp connections. Basidia are club shaped with four sterigmata, and have a clamp at the base. Spores are cylindrical to ellipsoid in shape with a smooth surface. They are hyaline (translucent), and have oily contents.

== Species ==
A 2008 estimate placed 13 species in Lopharia. As of May 2021, Index Fungorum accepts 15 species:

- Lopharia albida Rick (1938)
- Lopharia americana Rick (1928)
- Lopharia amethystea (Hjortstam & Ryvarden) A.L.Welden (2010)
- Lopharia bambusae Rick (1960)
- Lopharia cinerascens (Schwein.) G.Cunn. (1956)
- Lopharia cystidiosa (Rehill & B.K.Bakshi) Boidin (1969)
- Lopharia javanica Henn. & E.Nyman (1900)
- Lopharia lilacina (Berk. & Broome) A.L.Welden (2010)
- Lopharia ochracea G.Cunn. (1963)
- Lopharia papyracea (Bres.) D.A.Reid (1957)
- Lopharia papyrina (Mont.) Boidin (1959)
- Lopharia pilosiuscula (Hjortstam & Ryvarden) A.L.Welden (2010)
- Lopharia pseudocinerascens Boidin & Gilles (2003)
- Lopharia rimosissima Rick (1960)
- Lopharia rugulosa (Berk. & M.A.Curtis) Hjortstam (1995)
