= Namibialina =

Scientific classification
- Kingdom: Fungi
- Division: Ascomycota
- Class: Lecanoromycetes
- Order: Lecanorales
- Family: Ramalinaceae
- Genus: Namibialina; Spjut & Sérus. (2020)
- Species: N. melanothrix

Binomial name
- Namibialina melanothrix (Laurer) Spjut & Sérus. (2020)

Synonyms
- Ramalina melanothrix Laurer (1860); Ramalina capensis var. melanothrix (Laurer) Th.Fr. (1861); Desmazieria melanothrix (Laurer) C.W.Dodge (1971); Trichoramalina melanothrix (Laurer) Rundel & Bowler (1974); Niebla melanothrix (Laurer) Kistenich, Timdal, Bendiksby & S.Ekman (2018)

Single-species fungal genus

Namibialina is a fungal genus in the family Ramalinaceae. It comprises the single species Namibialina melanothrix, a fruticose lichen. The genus is endemic to the coastal deserts of southwestern Africa, from southern Angola to South Africa's Cape of Good Hope, where it grows on rocks, soil, or as an epiphyte on tree bark. It is characterized by its shrubby thallus with branching patterns that often end in blackish or hair-like projections, and by distinctive longitudinal grooves formed by cartilage-like tissue. The genus was circumscribed in 2020 based on molecular phylogenetic evidence showing it diverged from its sister genus Ramalina about 48 million years ago during the early Eocene.

== Taxonomy ==
The genus Namibialina was circumscribed in 2020 by the lichenologists Richard Sjput and Emmanuël Sérusiaux to accommodate species previously classified in other genera of the Ramalinaceae. Phylogenetic analysis revealed that these species formed a distinct lineage that diverged from its sister genus Ramalina approximately 48 million years ago during the early Eocene.

The type species, Namibialina melanothrix, has undergone several taxonomic transfers since its original description as Ramalina melanothrix by Johann Friedrich Laurer in 1860. It was later moved to Trichoramalina by Philip Rundel and Peter Bowler in 1974, and subsequently transferred to Niebla by Sonja Kistenich and colleagues in 2018. Although the genus lacks clear-cut morphological, anatomical, or chemical autapomorphies, its significant evolutionary divergence from Ramalina supported its recognition as a separate genus.

Molecular phylogenetic studies have shown that specimens previously identified as "Ramalina angulosa" represent a paraphyletic assemblage of at least three distinct species, with N. melanothrix nested among them. The full diversity of the genus is likely undersampled, as available DNA sequences are primarily from specimens collected along just 120 kilometers of Namibian coastline.

The genus name combines Namibia, referencing its geographic distribution in the coastal deserts of southwestern Africa, with the suffix -lina, which is commonly used in lichen taxonomy and appears in the related genus name Ramalina. The species delimitation within Namibialina remains partially unresolved. While N. melanothrix is clearly defined, the taxonomy of the "angulosa" complex requires further study, with preliminary evidence suggesting the existence of multiple undescribed species throughout its range from southern Angola to South Africa's Cape of Good Hope.

== Description ==
The genus Namibialina consists of shrubby (fruticose) lichens that typically emerge from a single, anchoring holdfast. Their thalli (lichen bodies) can vary in size, reaching several centimeters tall on tree bark (epiphytic) or rock (saxicolous) surfaces, and sometimes forming compact, cushion-like clusters on soil. When growing in cushions, these can be up to about 10–15 cm (4–6 in) in diameter and 2–6 cm (0.8–2.4 in) high. The thallus is usually pale green or has a yellowish-green hue, giving the lichen a distinctive, subdued colouration.

The branches of Namibialina generally divide in a branching pattern that may be regular or irregular, with some splitting in a "Y"-shaped (dichotomous) manner. Many branch tips end in slender, hair-like projections or are capped with blackish hairs. The main branches tend to be round or slightly flattened, with noticeable grooves or channels along their length. These grooves arise from thick strands of cartilage-like tissue that provide structural integrity. Smaller lateral branches and spines may be present, but this genus does not produce specialized reproductive structures called isidia or powdery reproductive areas known as soralia.

Internally, the medulla—a central layer of the thallus—has a delicate, cobweb-like (arachnoid) structure. The cortex, or outer protective layer, has two layers but may show some variation in structure. Namibialina lichens sometimes produce apothecia (fruiting bodies), which are saucer-shaped and located at the branch tips or edges; these structures are oriented perpendicular to the branch. The spores produced in the apothecia are small, ellipsoid in shape, and have a single septum (internal partition).

The genus produces usnic acid, a secondary metabolite commonly found in lichen that lends a yellowish tint to the cortex and provides some protection against sunlight.

== Habitat and distribution ==
Namibialina species are restricted to coastal desert areas of southwestern Africa, where they can grow as epiphytes or on rocks, although they also form terricolous shrubby cushions. Current collections are known from approximately 120 km of coastline north of Swakopmund, Namibia, though the genus is suspected to be more widely distributed along the coastal deserts from southern Angola to the Cape of Good Hope.
