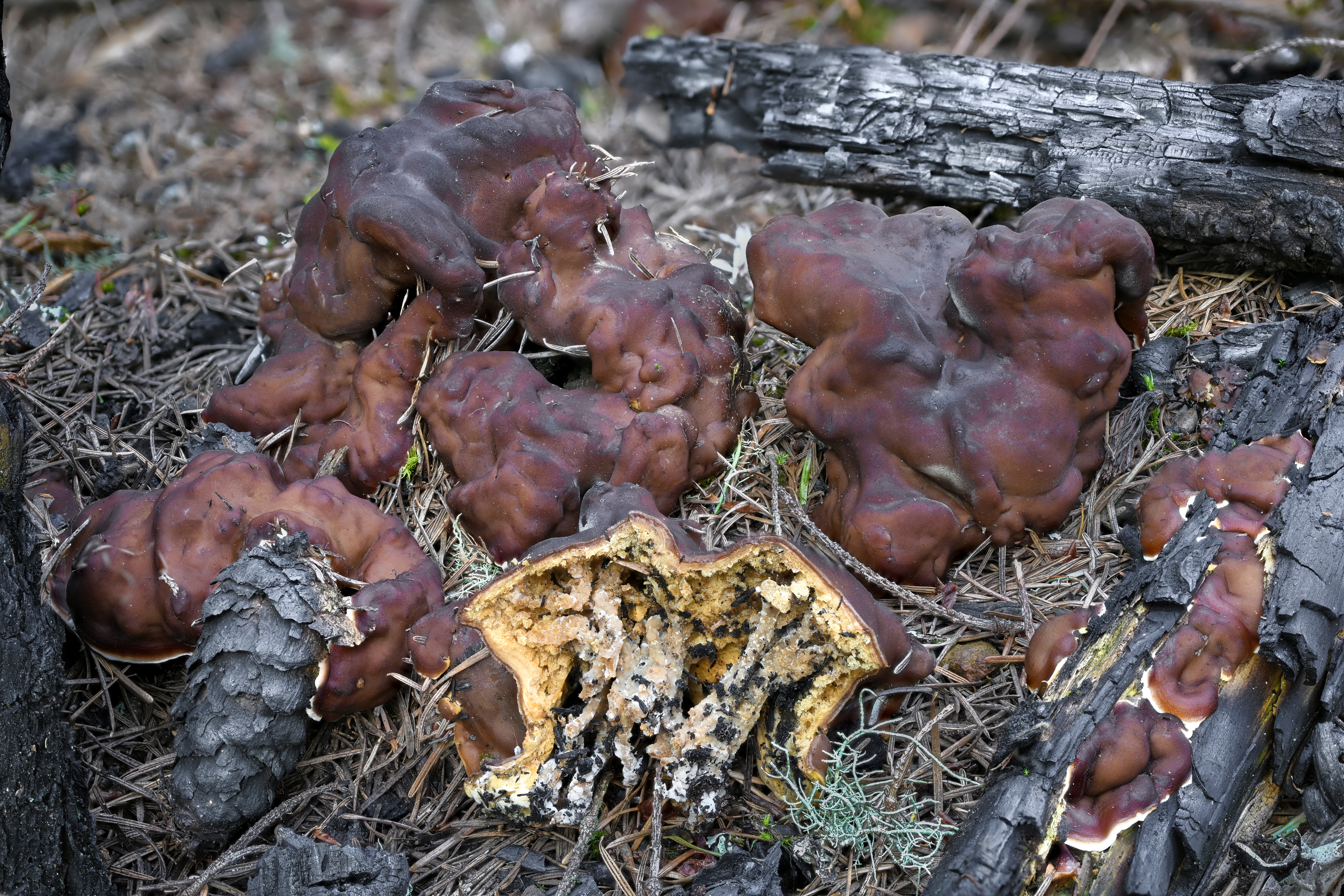

Scientific classification
- Kingdom: Fungi
- Division: Ascomycota
- Class: Pezizomycetes
- Order: Pezizales
- Family: Rhizinaceae
- Genus: Rhizina
- Species: R. undulata

Binomial name
- Rhizina undulata Fr. (1815)

Synonyms
- Helvella inflata Schaeff. (1774); Rhizina laevigata Fr. (1815); Rhizina praetexta Ehrenb. (1818); Rhizina laevigata var. praetexta (Ehrenb.) Pers. (1822); Rhizina inflata (Schaeff.) Quél. (1886); Rhizina inflata var. rhizophora Massee

= Rhizina undulata =

Species of fungus

Rhizina undulata, commonly known as the doughnut fungus or the pine firefungus, is a species of fungus in the family Rhizinaceae. The fruit bodies of the fungus are dark purple brown with a bright yellow margin, crust-like and attached to the growing surface by numerous root-like yellow rhizoids. R. undulata has a cosmopolitan distribution, and commonly occurs on clearings or burned areas throughout central and northern Europe, North America, northern Asia, and southern Africa. It is parasitic on conifer seedlings, and has caused considerable damage to tree plantations worldwide.

== Taxonomy ==
The fungus was first described in 1774 as Helvella inflata by the German polymath Jacob Christian Schäffer. It acquired its current name in 1815 by virtue of its publication in Elias Magnus Fries's Observationes Mycologicae.

The specific epithet undulata means "wavy" or "undulating". Common names that have been used to refer to the species include "crust-like cup", "pine-fire cushion", "doughnut fungus", and "pine firefungus".

== Description ==
Fruit bodies (apothecia), which may be up to 6 cm (2.4 in) wide, are flat, with irregular lobes, and are attached to the growing surface on the entire lower side by numerous whitish to yellowish rhizomorphs. The hymenium is dark purple brown to blackish, while the margin is a cream color(like the underside), and wavy and irregular. When moist, the surface is sticky. The fruit body has a leathery texture when old. In very young fruit bodies, the surface is white; the brown color initially appears in the center and expands rapidly thereafter. Later in the growing season, several of these apothecia may clump together and form irregularly-shaped structures up to 25 cm wide. They will lose their cream-colored ring and become black. These are the resting structures that will allow the fungus to survive unfavorable conditions until another fire occurs and the ascospores germinate.

The spores of Rhizina undulata are fusiform (fuse-shaped), apiculate, minutely verricose at maturity, with one or two oil drops, and have dimensions of 30–40 by 8–11 μm. The asci are roughly cylindrical, and 250–280 by 14–18 μm. Like most other Pezizales, the asci open at maturity by means of an apical, lid-like flap of tissue termed an operculum. The paraphyses are slightly club-shaped, tips encrusted with tubular setae, thin-walled, brown, aseptate and parallel-sided, tapering to a blunt point, and are 7–11 μm wide.

=== Similar species ===
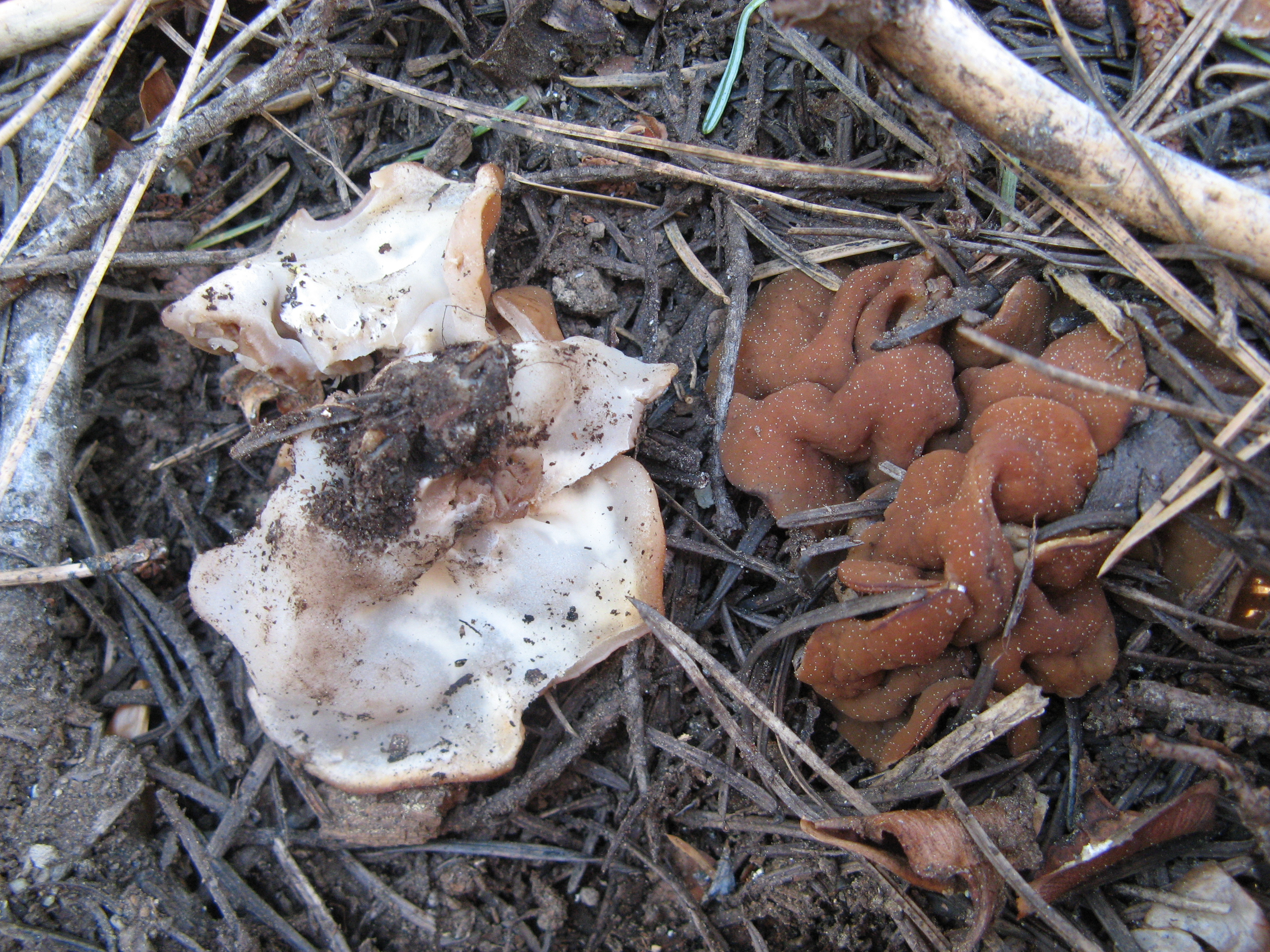
Discina ancilis is a lookalike

Disciotis venosa has an overall similar blistered appearance, but can be distinguished by its distinct bleach-like odor. Discina ancilis bears a general resemblance to Rhizina undulata, but its fruit bodies lack rhizoids on their undersurface, and are attached to the substrate at a central point.

== Symptoms and Signs ==
One of the main symptoms of the seedlings are that they appear stressed. The needles will be necrotic, and they can appear girdled at or below the soil line. Leader growth will also be stunted. The roots will be covered in lesions and white to yellow mycelium. Symptoms can also appear on mature trees, and may include extensive cone production, reduced shoot growth, a significant amount of resin production from the lower part of the stem, and chlorotic and necrotic needles. Fruiting structures will be very distinct, as they can be up to 6 cm in diameter and are chestnut brown with brain-like lobes and fissures. The presence of these fruiting structures, as well as their proximity to the trees, can be critical signs in diagnosis of Rhizina root disease. Other contributing factors are the proximity of the fire sites as well as the mycelium and the lesions present on the roots. The signs and symptoms are most commonly seen in the late summer and fall in wet years.

== Habitat and distribution ==
This is a widespread fungus that grows on burned soil or conifer debris. The spores are activated by the heat of the fire, which is why the disease is present in burned soil. This is because the fire breaks the spore dormancy and also creates a competitive advantage and allows the fungus to thrive. It prefers growing in acidic soil. Although it is regarded as a saprobic species, it can also attack conifers of varying age parasitically. Its parasitic nature was recognized by scientists in the late 1800s and early 1900s, in particular, through several studies by German forestry scientist and mycologist Robert Hartig. He determined that the fungus can cause the death of four-year-old seedlings of several conifers, including European silver fir (Abies alba), eastern white pine (Pinus strobus), European larch (Larix decidua), Sitka spruce (Picea sitchensis), mountain hemlock (Tsuga mertensiana), Douglas fir Pseudotsuga menziesii, and sweet chestnut (Castanea vesca). Later research determined that the fungus also attacks conifers between 15 and 60 years old.

The roots of seedling attacked by R. undulata are matted together with a white mycelium that penetrates all parts of the cortical and bast tissues. Hartig grew the fungus in culture, and was able to follow the growth of the mycelium using light microscopy. He wrote:

[the mycelium] grows between the cells of the parenchymatous tissues, while in the soft bast its progress is partly intercullular and partly intracellular, the sieve-tubes being frequently packed full of a dense filamentous mycelium. In the process of time the mycelium kills the tissues of the cortex and soft bast, whose elements become brown and completely dismembered ... The development is so luxuriant that it forms, in certain places, a pseudo-parenchymatous fungus-tissue, consisting of vesicular swollen cells. This however is speedily destroyed as soon as the tissues between the wood and periderm become almost completely destroyed.

The mycelial strands surrounding the diseased roots are continuous with the rhizoid strands that originate from the fruit body underside and attach it to the substrate.

Rhizina undulata attack in recently established conifer plantations in areas where slash burning after clearcutting has been performed is a well-known phenomenon. Because the optimum temperature for spore germination is high (35–45 °C (95–113 °F)), the spores may lie dormant in soil for two years. As a result of these fires, the underlying soil is heated so that suitable conditions are created for the germination of ascospores. The use of hot asphalt (110–130 °C (230–266 °F)) for paving new roads has also been observed to cause the same deleterious effect on neighboring conifers. Rhizina undulata has been recorded in northern Asia, Europe, and North America. It has been introduced into southern Africa.

Rhizina undulata is a homothallic fungus, and so it can produce fruit bodies without mating with another individual. Fruit bodies can occur prolifically in favorable habitats. In one recorded instance there were over 300 fruit bodies found within a radius of 6–7 m (20–23 ft) of a single pine stump. Some studies have suggested that the fungus spreads radially from a single starting point, so that the fruit bodies appear in wider circles in successive years (similar to growth observed in a fairy ring), but other studies have not noticed this phenomenon. The spread of the fungus stops four to seven years after the initial infection.

== Management ==
Preventing the disease from happening is easier than trying to cure it once it has started. Avoiding burning after clearfelling an area is one way to help prevent the spread of the disease. One of the main ways to prevent the disease is to delay planting of trees for 1.5 to 2 years after a forest fire or burning due to the fact that heat is what activates the spores.
