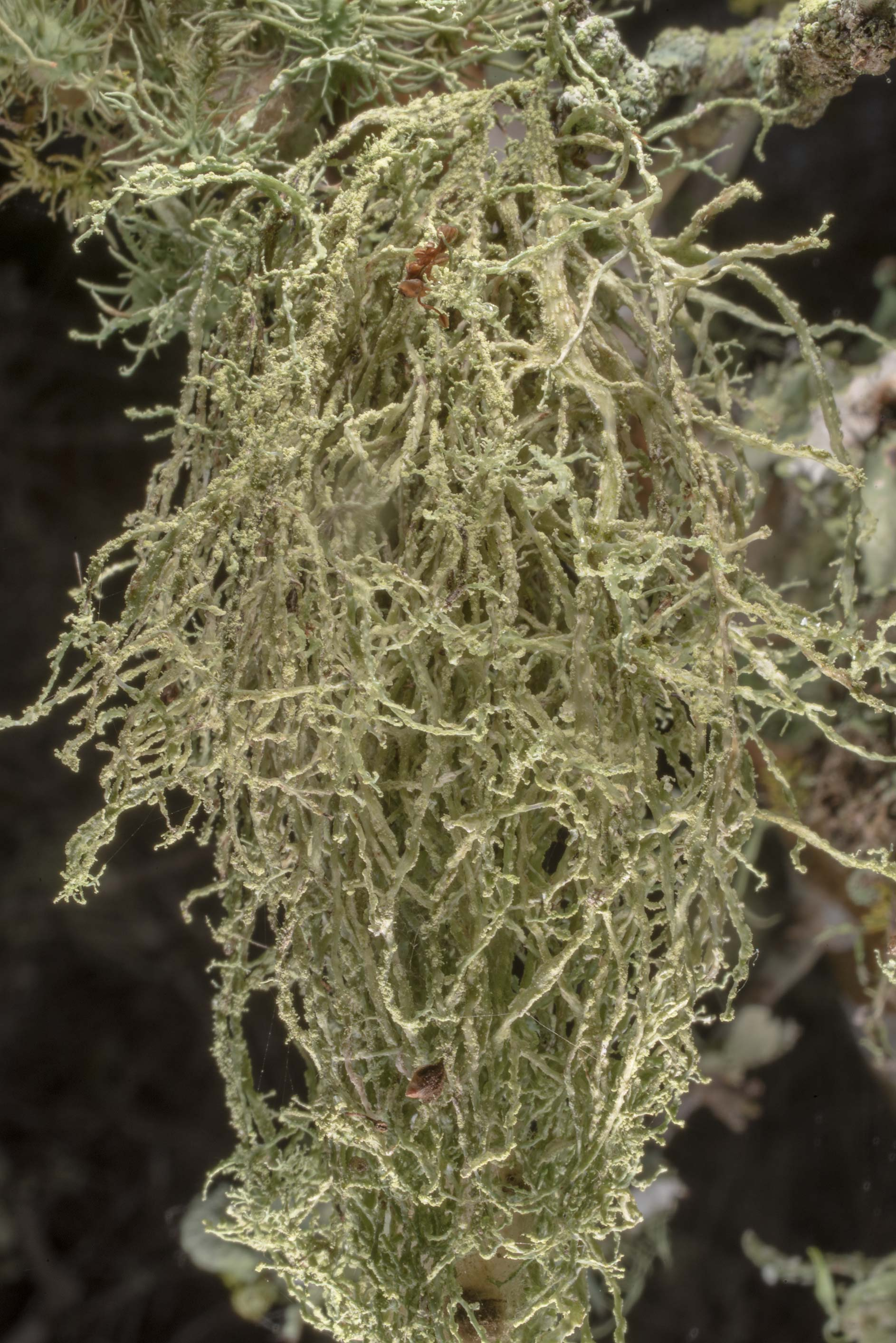

Scientific classification
- Kingdom: Fungi
- Division: Ascomycota
- Class: Lecanoromycetes
- Order: Lecanorales
- Family: Ramalinaceae
- Genus: Ramalina
- Species: R. peruviana

Binomial name
- Ramalina peruviana Ach. (1810)

Synonyms
- List: Lichen squarrosus * peruviana (Ach.) Lam. (1813); Desmazieria peruviana (Ach.) Follmann & Huneck (1969); Ramalina pumila subsp. javanica Nyl. (1870); Ramalina javanica (Nyl.) Zahlbr. (1930); Fistulariella javanica (Nyl.) Bowler & Rundel (1977); Ramalina farinacea var. dendroides Müll.Arg. (1883); Ramalina farinacea var. squarrosa Müll.Arg. (1883); Ramalina farinacea f. squarrosa (Müll.Arg.) Stizenb. (1890); Ramalina roesleri var. isidiotyla Vain. (1924); Ramalina crispans Werner (1977); Ramalina hyrcana Sipman (2011)

= Ramalina peruviana =

Species of lichen-forming fungus

Ramalina peruviana is a species of fruticose lichen in the family Ramalinaceae with a pantropical distribution. The lichen was first formally described by Erik Acharius in 1810, who wrote of its flat, compressed, branching thallus with narrow, undulating branches. It typically occurs on the bark of trees (corticolous) although occasionally it grows on rocks (saxicolous). Ramalina peruviana is widely distributed, found in subtropical and warm temperate regions across several continents. It has been recorded in diverse locations such as Pacific Islands, the southern United States, East Africa, Asia, Australasia, and South America. Its presence has been documented in specific habitats like mangroves in Australia and on certain tree species in Taiwan and China, where it thrives at higher elevations.

The lichen has an intricately branched and tufted thallus, greyish-green to yellowish-green in colour. The branches are rounded or irregularly thickened, and dotted with soralia (granular reproductive particles). Occasionally, the thallus surface has tiny pores for air exchange, known as pseudocyphellae. Apothecia (fruiting bodies) are rarely made by this species. Ramalina peruviana contains several secondary metabolites (lichen products), and a few novel chemicals have been isolated and identified from this lichen.

== Taxonomy ==
The lichen was first scientifically described in 1810 by the Swedish lichenologist Erik Acharius. In his diagnosis he details a lichen with a flat, compressed, branching, ash-coloured thallus, having narrow, undulating, twisted branches with uneven edges and ends that are torn or somewhat finger-like. He noted it growing in Peru alongside lichens Borrera villosa and Borrera ephebea. He went on to further describe the lichen: (Note: Passage translated from Latin by GPT-4.)

The thallus is small, bushy from entangled branches, barely exceeding half an inch in height. The branches and branchlets are very narrow, irregular, varying in width and branching pattern, sometimes narrower at the base, wider at other places, and more expanded when branching again, leading to a non-linear, variously dissected, and partitioned appearance, especially towards the digitately parted tips, where they are thinnest and always flat-compressed, similar above and below, sometimes slightly powdery at the tips".

The taxonomic history of Ramalina peruviana has evolved significantly in the two centuries since its original description by Acharius. Initially identified with a limited set of characteristics, modern microscopy, chemical analyses with thin-layer chromatography, and molecular phylogenetics have expanded its classification framework. The species was hypothesised by Richard Spjut and colleagues (2020) to be distinct from similar records in Southern Europe and Macaronesia, suggesting those belong to Ramalina crispans. The type specimen's precise origin, initially vague, was narrowed down to the Pacific coast of Peru, near Lima, based on associated species and historical context provided by botanists like Mariano Lagasca. Because the original type specimen was too old for DNA sequencing, Harrie Sipman and Ángel Ordaya obtained fresh material from the "locus classicus" in the Lachay National Reserve (Huaura Province, Peru). By sequencing the internal transcribed spacer from these specimens, they demonstrated a well-supported clade with R. crispans and R. hyrcana and were thus able to confirm them as synonyms of R. peruviana. In this analysis, R. polymorpha appeared as a sister taxon.

== Description ==
Ramalina peruviana has a thallus whose colour ranges from a grey-green to yellow-green hue, forming tufted, erect to slightly hanging clusters that can extend from 2 to 6 cm (13/16 to 2 3/8 in) in length, and up to about 3 cm (1 3/16 in) high. The branching of this lichen is intricate, varying from nearly symmetrical divisions (subdichotomous) to more irregular formations, with branches measuring between 0.15 and 1.3 mm in width. These branches may present as flat, nearly round (subterete), or round (terete) in cross-section, and can sometimes twist slightly, ending in sharp tips. The chondroid tissue (i.e., in cartilage-like central core of the branches) of Ramalina peruviana is not cracked. The cortex measures 15–20 μm thick.

The surface texture of Ramalina peruviana can be either matt or shiny and varies from smooth to wrinkled (rugose), with pseudocyphellae—small, porous areas that allow gas exchange—occasionally present. The base of the lichen, or holdfast, may be clearly defined or spread out, especially in denser colonies. One of the distinguishing features of this species is the presence of soralia, which are small structures that produce powdery reproductive particles. These soralia are dot-like (punctiform) and can be found along the edges or at the tips of the branches, often giving rise to tiny fibrils. The granular soredia measure 35–50 μm in diameter.

Reproductive structures known as apothecia are rarely observed in Ramalina peruviana; if present, they are located on the margins or sides of the thallus. When they occur, the apothecia have discs ranging from 0.4 to 2.7 mm in diameter, which can be concave to flat and sometimes notched. The ascospores are slender and spindle-shaped (fusiform), typically measuring 14.5–17 by 3–6 μm and can be straight or slightly curved.

The photobiont partner of Ramalina peruviana is a member of the green algal genus Trebouxia. It is further characterised as a member of "clade IV", a grouping of Trebouxia found in tropical Ramalina species.

=== Similar species ===
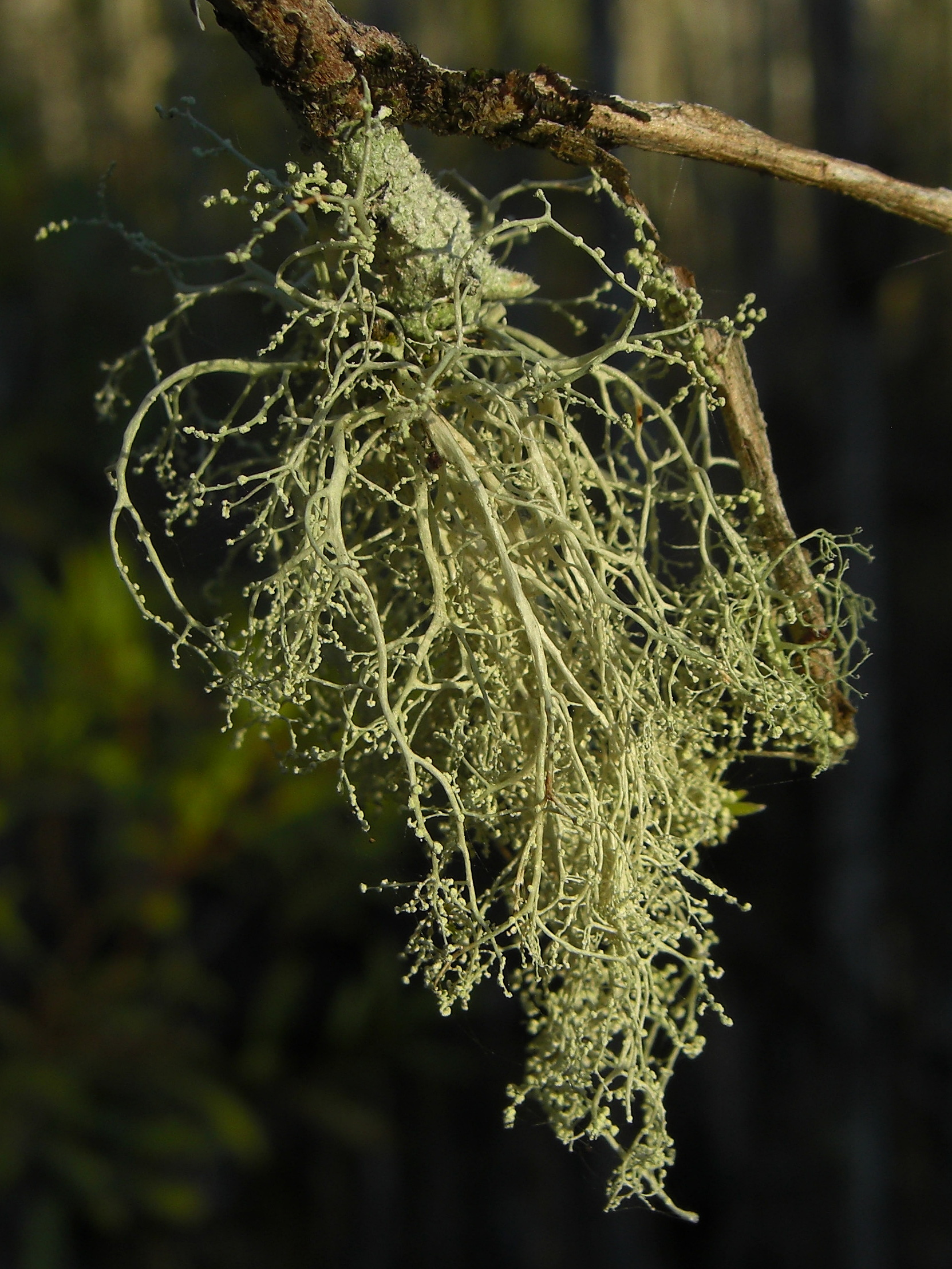
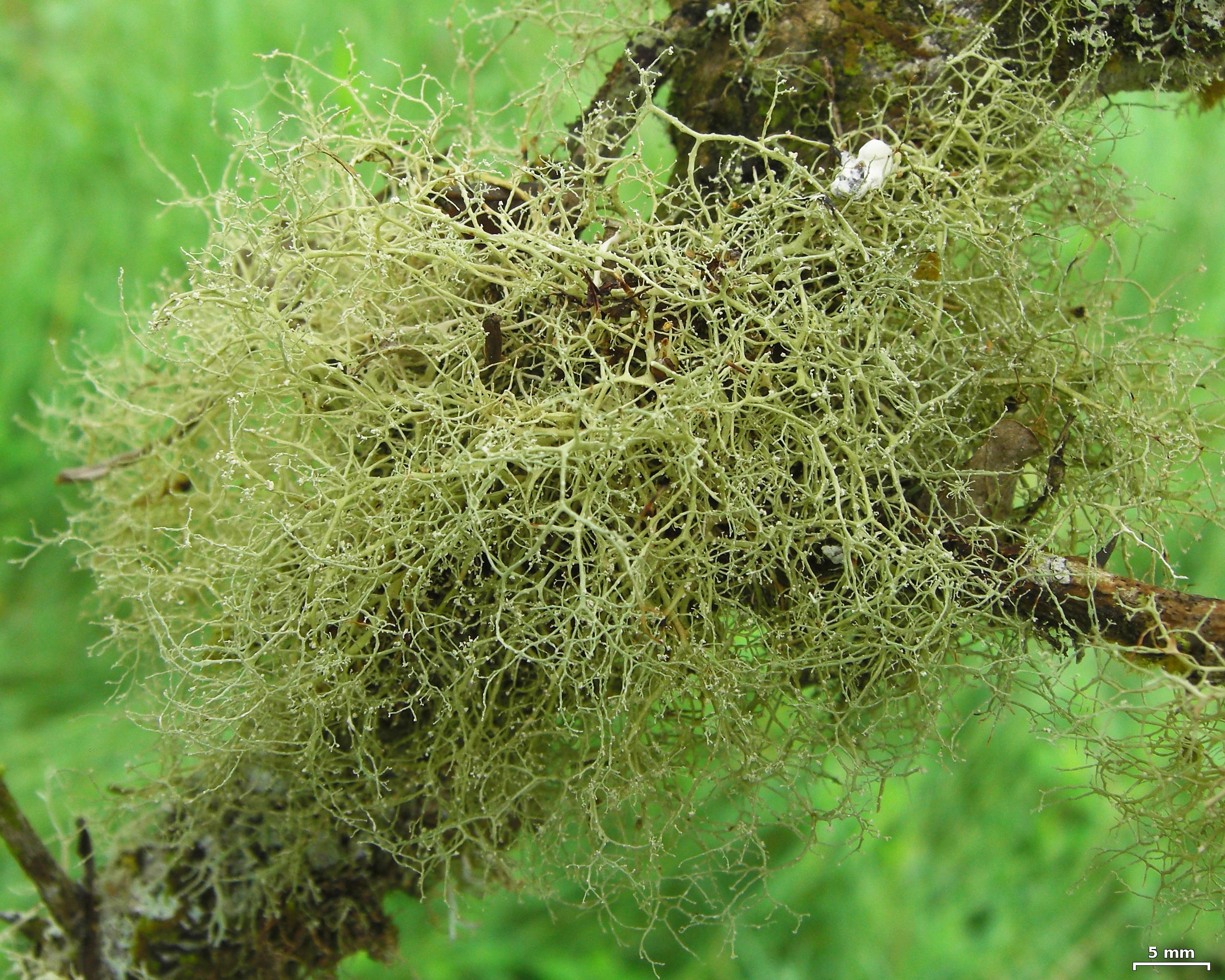
Ramalina dendriscoides (right) and R. sorediosa are lookalikes

Ramalina peruviana closely resembles R. dendriscoides in terms of its branching style and subterete branches. The main distinguishing feature of R. peruviana is its predominantly lateral soralia, as opposed to the mostly apical soralia found in R. dendriscoides. Additionally, R. peruviana uniquely produces sekikaic acid, while R. dendriscoides is characterised by the presence of salazinic acid in its composition.

Ramalina hossei is also similar to R. peruviana but can be differentiated by its branches' smoother surface, the presence of cracked chondroid tissue, and its short fusiform spores. Conversely, in R. peruviana, the chondroid tissue remains intact without cracks, and it features narrow fusiform spores. Ramalina peruviana is also similar to R. sorediosa due to their thin branches and overall similar appearance. However, R. peruviana can be distinguished by its irregularly angular to subtly flattened branches, which are never completely round (terete). A key identifying feature of R. peruviana is its fine isidiate branchlets that often emerge from the soralia and are typically found at the tips of the thallus branches. These distinctive branchlets are not present in R. sorediosa.

== Chemistry ==
The results for standard chemical spot tests on Ramalina peruviana are all negative, in both the cortex and medulla. Usnic acid, homosekikaic acid, and sekikaic acid are the three major secondary metabolites (lichen products) that are present in Ramaline peruviana. This combination of substances comprises the so-called sekikaic acid chemosyndrome: sekikaic acid as the major compound, with 4'O-demethylsekikaic and homosekikaic acids as satellite metabolites. The mycobiont (fungus component) of Ramalina peruviana was reported to form sekikaic acid when cultivated in liquid culture medium as it does in the intact lichen, but not associated "satellite" compounds. When grown on a solid culture medium, however, it made the full complement of its chemosyndrome. Unexpectedly, it produced atranorin when in liquid culture, a secondary metabolite it was not known to produce when growing as a lichen with its photobiont.

Sekikaic acid is a major metabolite in Ramalina peruviana.

Several other substances are known to occur in the lichen in minor or trace amounts: nonadecan-1-ol; nonadecenoic acid; three monophenolic compounds, rhizonic acid, divarinolmonomethylether, and divaricatinic acid; and two depsides, and decarboxy-2'-O-methyldivaricatic acid. Five triterpene compounds are known to occur in the species: β-amyrone, isoarborinol acetate, hopane-6α,22-diol, hopane-22-ol, hopane-6α,16β,22-triol, along with two ergostane-type sterols, 5α,8α-ergosterol peroxide, and brassicasterol. Three new compounds, named peruvinides A-C, were reported in 2020.

== Habitat and distribution ==
The distribution of Ramalina peruviana extends into subtropical and warm temperate locations. Although typically corticolous (bark-dwelling), it is also known to occasionally grow on rocks (saxicolous), and was once recorded on a wooden fence post. In addition to its country of origin in Peru, the lichen has also been recorded from Africa, Australia, several Pacific Islands, Tristan da Cunha, and Saint Helena. Other South American countries that have recorded the presence of Ramalina peruviana are Brazil, Chile, Ecuador, and Uruguay. It occurs in several of the Cape Verde islands. Its distribution in North America extends north to the southern United States, including central Texas, Georgia, and Florida. Its East African range includes Kenya, Tanzania, and Uganda. It is also known from Morocco, where it was documented under the name Ramalina crispans.

Although present in New Zealand, it is relatively uncommon. Nearby Pacific locations such as Chatham, Manawatāwhi / Three Kings, Kermadec Islands, and Cook Islands also host this species. In Australia, its grows exclusively corticously, and is most commonly found on the mangrove species Ceriops tagal and Rhizophora stylosa. The environmental conditions in these mangrove communities – including high temperatures, high light intensity, and low humidity – are thought to be ideal for the growth of the lichen. In Taiwan it is locally abundant, particularly on the trunks of Cocos nucifera in the southern part of the country. Its altitudinal range in Chinese habitats spans elevations between 2,000 and 3,450 m (6,560 and 11,320 ft), usually on the bark of Camellia or Rhododendron. Additionally, it is found in Japan and South Korea. In Iran, where it was described under the name Ramalina hyrcana, it is found exclusively in the Hyrcanian forests along the Caspian coast, where it grows on tree trunks and is quite shade tolerant.

== Species interactions ==
Several lichen-associated fungi have isolated from Ramalina peruviana and identified as belonging to the genera Colletotrichum, Daldinia, Hypoxylon, Nemania, Nigrospora, and Xylaria. The resident fungi have a collectively higher antioxidant activity than that of the host lichen, suggesting that the fungi, through the production of antioxidant compounds, might play a protective role in the lichen symbiosis.

Lichenostigma maureri is a lichenicolous fungus that infects Ramalina peruviana. Common in Ecuador and known throughout South America, both sexual and asexual forms of the fungus (the latter known as Phaeosporobolus usneae) have been found parasitising the lichen in Cajas National Park.

== See also ==
- List of Ramalina species
