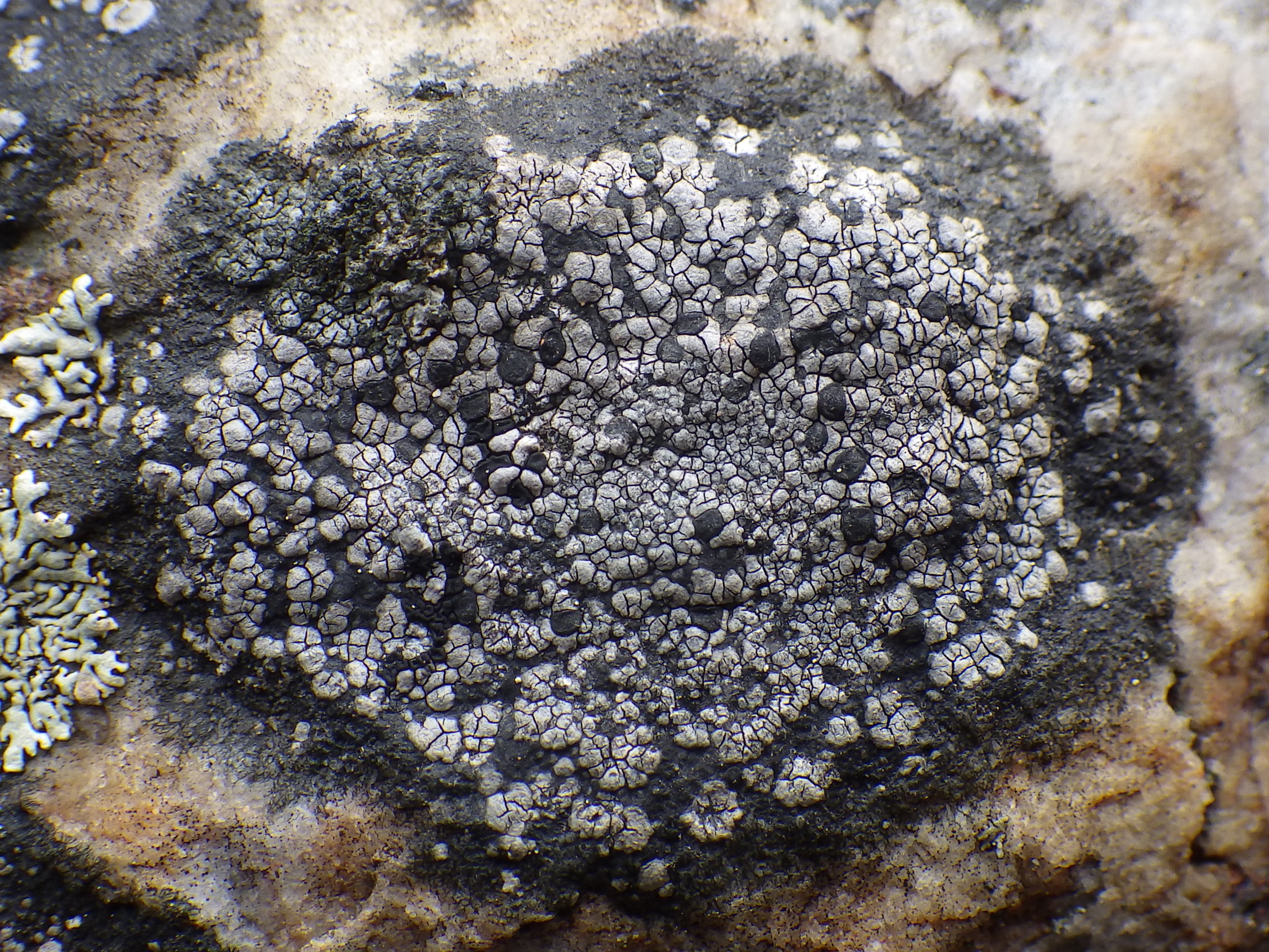

Conservation status
- Apparently Secure (NatureServe)

Scientific classification
- Kingdom: Fungi
- Division: Ascomycota
- Class: Lecanoromycetes
- Order: Rhizocarpales
- Family: Rhizocarpaceae
- Genus: Rhizocarpon
- Species: R. badioatrum

Binomial name
- Rhizocarpon badioatrum (Flörke ex Spreng.) Th.Fr. (1874)

Synonyms
- List: Lecidea badioatra Flörke ex Spreng. (1821); Lecidea alboatra var. badioatra (Flörke ex Spreng.) Nyl. (1853); Buellia badioatra (Flörke ex Spreng.) Mudd (1861); Catocarpus badioater (Flörke ex Spreng.) Arnold (1871); Lecidea atroalba var. badioatra (Flörke ex Spreng.) Vain. (1878); Diphaeis badioatra (Flörke ex Spreng.) Clem. (1909); Lecidea incusa Ach. (1814); Rhizocarpon badioatrum var. incusum (Ach.) Zahlbr. (1926); Catocarpus badioater var. incusus (Ach.) M.Choisy (1950); Lecidea atroalba var. applanata Fr. (1845); Rhizocarpon applanatum Th.Fr. (1874); Lecidea applanata (Th.Fr.) Leight. (1879); Catocarpus applanatus (Th.Fr.) Arnold (1879); Buellia badioatra var. applanata (Th.Fr.) Boistel (1903)

= Rhizocarpon badioatrum =

Species of lichen

Rhizocarpon badioatrum is a widely distributed species of saxicolous (rock-dwelling), crustose lichen in the family Rhizocarpaceae. This lichen forms a brown crust broken into small tile-like plates surrounded by a distinctive jet-black border, with scattered black disc-shaped fruiting bodies up to 1 mm across. It has a very wide global distribution, being found across multiple continents including Europe, North America, Australia, Asia, Africa, and even Antarctica.

== Taxonomy ==
Kurt Polycarp Joachim Sprengel provided the first valid scientific description of the lichen in 1821. He originally classified it in the genus Lecidea. Theodor Magnus Fries transferred it to Rhizocarpon in 1874.

== Description ==
Rhizocarpon badioatrum spreads as a crust up to about 10 cm across. Its surface is broken into tile-like plates (areoles), each no more than 2 mm wide. These plates are matt, medium- to dark-brown, often tinged pinkish or red-brown, and sit within a well-developed jet-black border of fungal tissue, the prothallus. The areoles are thick and mostly flat but can have scalloped edges; where they meet one another the thallus appears as a mosaic. Internally, the white fungal layer (the medulla) shows no iodine staining reaction (I–), and a drop of potassium hydroxide solution (the K test) may leave it unchanged or briefly yellow.

Scattered between the areoles are the fruit-bodies (apothecia), black discs up to 1 mm in diameter that remain essentially flat. A narrow, dark wall called the true exciple surrounds each disc; in section the inner part looks red-brown and flashes purple-red with the K test. The very top layer of the disc (the epithecium) is likewise red-brown and gives the same K-induced purple tint, sometimes releasing tiny red granules that dissolve in the reagent. Beneath this lies a clear spore-producing zone (the hymenium, about 110–120 μm tall) and a medium-brown foundation layer (the hypothecium), which shows no colour change with potassium hydroxide. Each club-shaped ascus produces eight ascospores; the mature spores measure 27–38 μm by 13–19 μm, are divided by a single cross-wall, and darken through blue-green to deep brown as they age. Para-phenylenediamine (the Pd test) is usually negative, though an orange flash or traces of stictic acid are occasionally detected.

== Distribution ==
Rhizocarpon badioatrum occurs in Europe, Macaronesia, southern Africa, South-East Asia, Papua New Guinea, North America, Argentina and Antarctica. It is also found in Greenland. In Australia, it has been recorded from south-eastern Queensland, New South Wales, Victoria, Tasmania, and the Australian Capital Territory.
