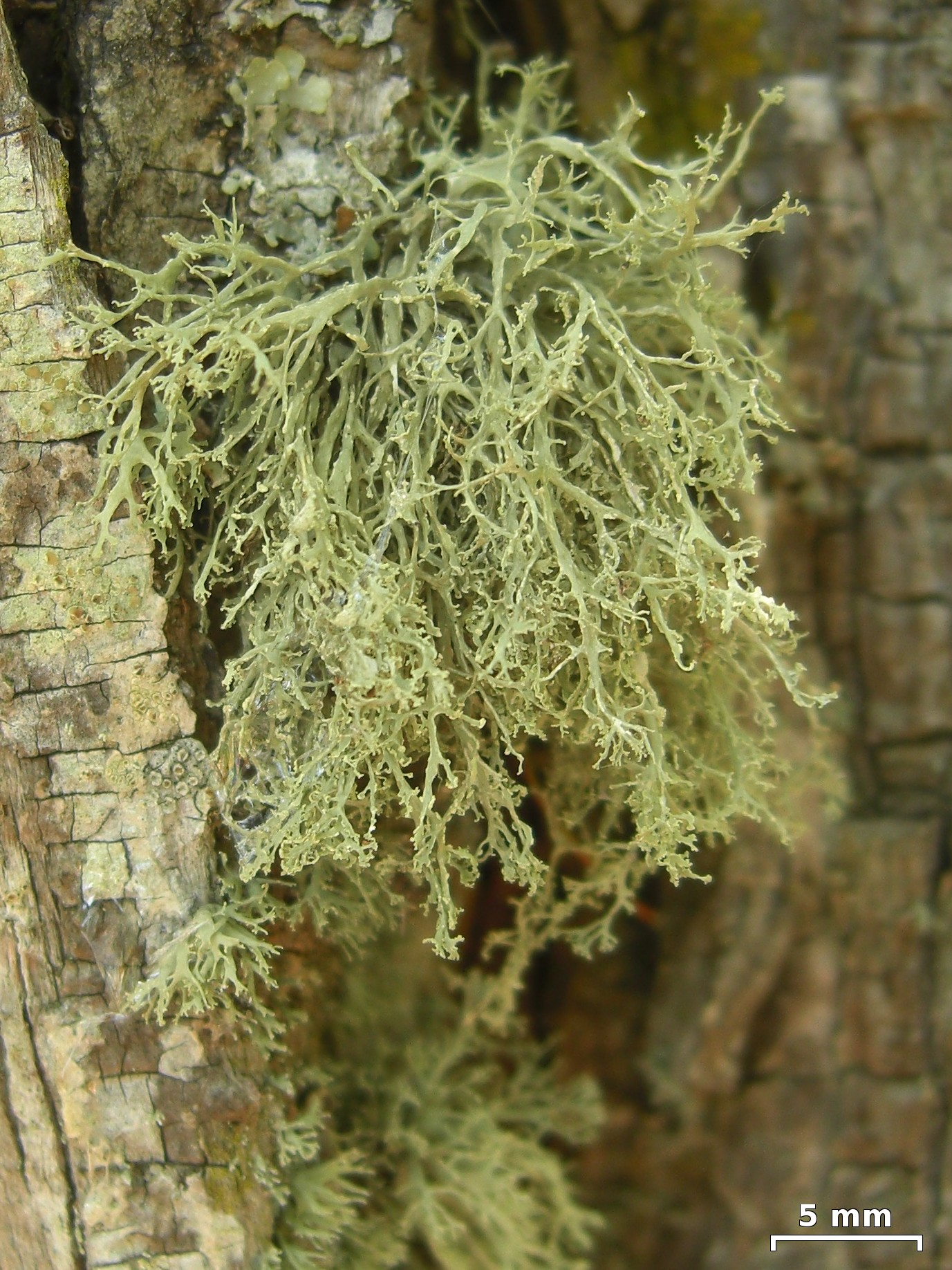

Conservation status
- Secure (NatureServe)

Scientific classification
- Kingdom: Fungi
- Division: Ascomycota
- Class: Lecanoromycetes
- Order: Lecanorales
- Family: Ramalinaceae
- Genus: Ramalina
- Species: R. intermedia

Binomial name
- Ramalina intermedia (Delise ex Nyl.) Nyl. (1873)

Synonyms
- Ramalina minuscula * intermedia Delise ex Nyl. (1870); Ramalina farinacea subsp. intermedia (Delise ex Nyl.) Cromb. (1886); Ramalina polymorpha subvar. intermedia (Delise ex Nyl.) Boistel (1903)

= Ramalina intermedia =

Species of lichen-forming fungus

Ramalina intermedia, the rock ramalina, is a species of fruticose lichen in the family Ramalinaceae.

== Description ==
Ramalina intermedia is a fruticose lichen with slender, branched thalli that are primarily attached to a substrate, often trees or rocks, by a small holdfast. Its branches are flattened, sometimes twisted, and have a light greenish-yellow color due to the presence of usnic acid, which is a secondary metabolite common in many lichens. The surface of the thallus is typically covered in tiny, granular structures known as soredia, which serve as a means of asexual reproduction. These soredia are particularly concentrated at the tips of the branches, forming soralia—powdery patches that appear terminally on recurved lobe tips.

Chemically, R. intermedia contains sekikaic acid and homosekikaic acid, with the occasional presence of atranorin, another lichen product. Thin-layer chromatography has confirmed these compounds across various populations, although there can be variations in their concentrations.

The overall structure of R. intermedia is typically isotomic, meaning the branches are of more or less equal length, giving it a symmetrically branched appearance. However, adventive branching may occur after damage to the thallus, leading to irregular branch patterns.

Microscopically, the photobiont layer—where the symbiotic algae reside—is located beneath a protective upper cortex, allowing the lichen to photosynthesize efficiently. The species lacks sexual reproductive structures like apothecia in most observed specimens in North America, which differentiates it from some similar species.

Compared to other Ramalina species, R. intermedia is smaller, with branches rarely exceeding 3 mm in width. It can be confused with species like Ramalina farinacea due to its morphology, but R. intermedia can be distinguished by its narrower lobes and absence of certain chemical compounds like protocetraric acid.

== See also ==
- List of Ramalina species
