= Johann Friedrich Laurer =

German anatomist (1798–1873)

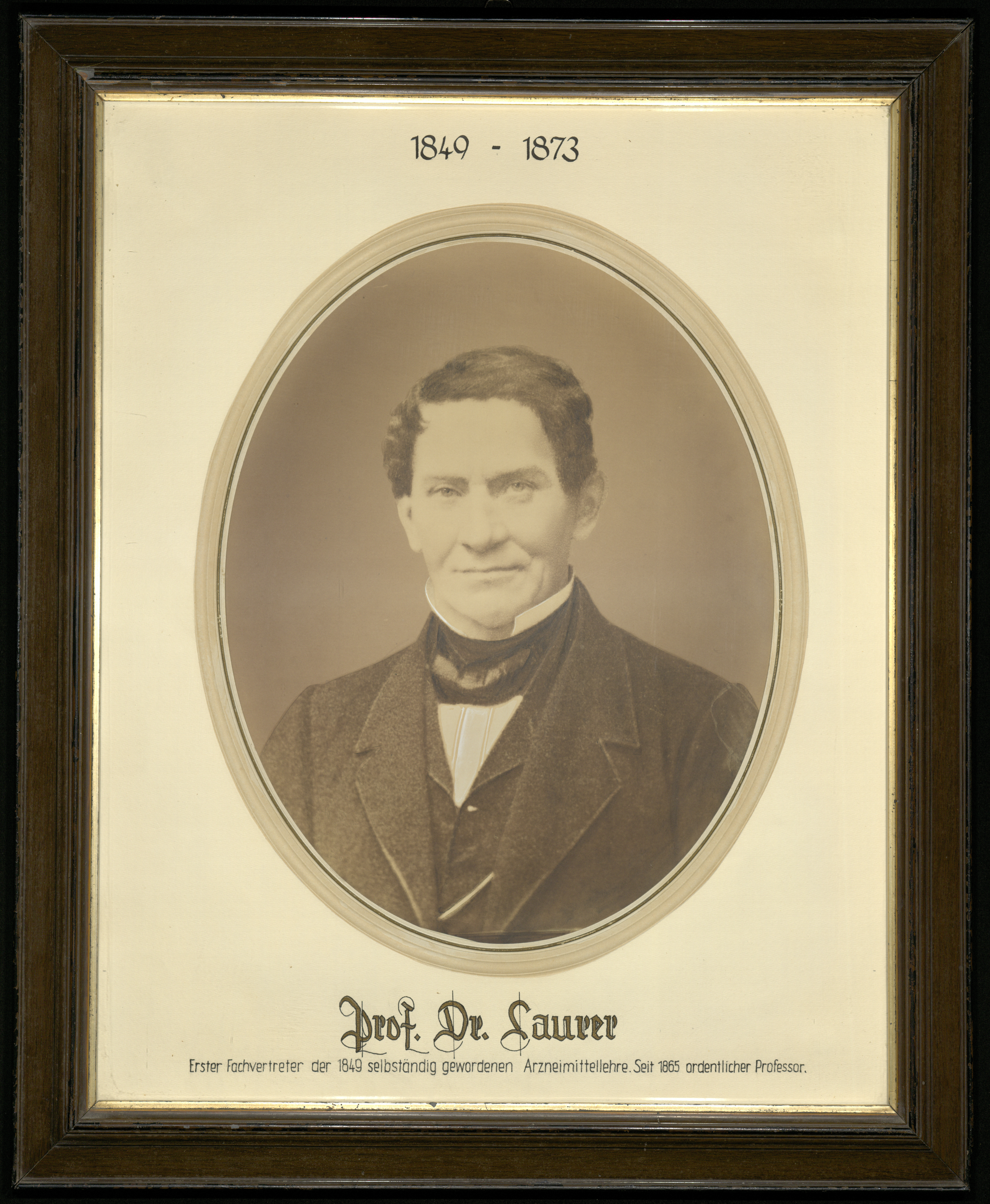
Johann Friedrich Laurer in the 1860/70s

Johann Friedrich Laurer (28 September 1798 in Bindlach – 23 November 1873 in Greifswald) was a German anatomist, pharmacologist and lichenologist.

He initially trained as a pharmacist, after which he worked as an assistant under Heinrich Christian Funck at the pharmacy in Gefrees. He made the acquaintance of David Heinrich Hoppe, who inspired him to learn botany, and by way of an invitation from bryologist Christian Friedrich Hornschuch, he became a student at the University of Greifswald.

From 1824 he studied medicine and sciences at Greifswald, where his instructors included anatomist Friedrich Christian Rosenthal. In 1830 he received his doctorate with the dissertation Disquisitiones anatomicae de Amphistomo conico, and shortly afterwards, obtained his habilitation for anatomy. In 1836 he was named an associate professor of anatomy and physiology at Greifswald. In 1849 he became an associate professor of pharmacology, and attained a full professorship in 1863.

In 1830 he described a muscular duct found in some trematodes that is now referred to as Laurer's canal. In 1841 Ludwig Reichenbach named the fungal genus Laurera (family Trypetheliaceae) after him. Other mycological genera that bear his name are Laureriella (Hepp, 1867) and Laureromyces (Cif. & Tomas., 1953).

In 1827 he published Beiträge zur kryptogamischen Flora der Insel Rügen ("Contribution to the cryptogamic flora of the island of Rügen"). His lichenology herbarium became part of the state herbarium in Berlin.

== See also ==
- Category:Taxa named by Johann Friedrich Laurer
