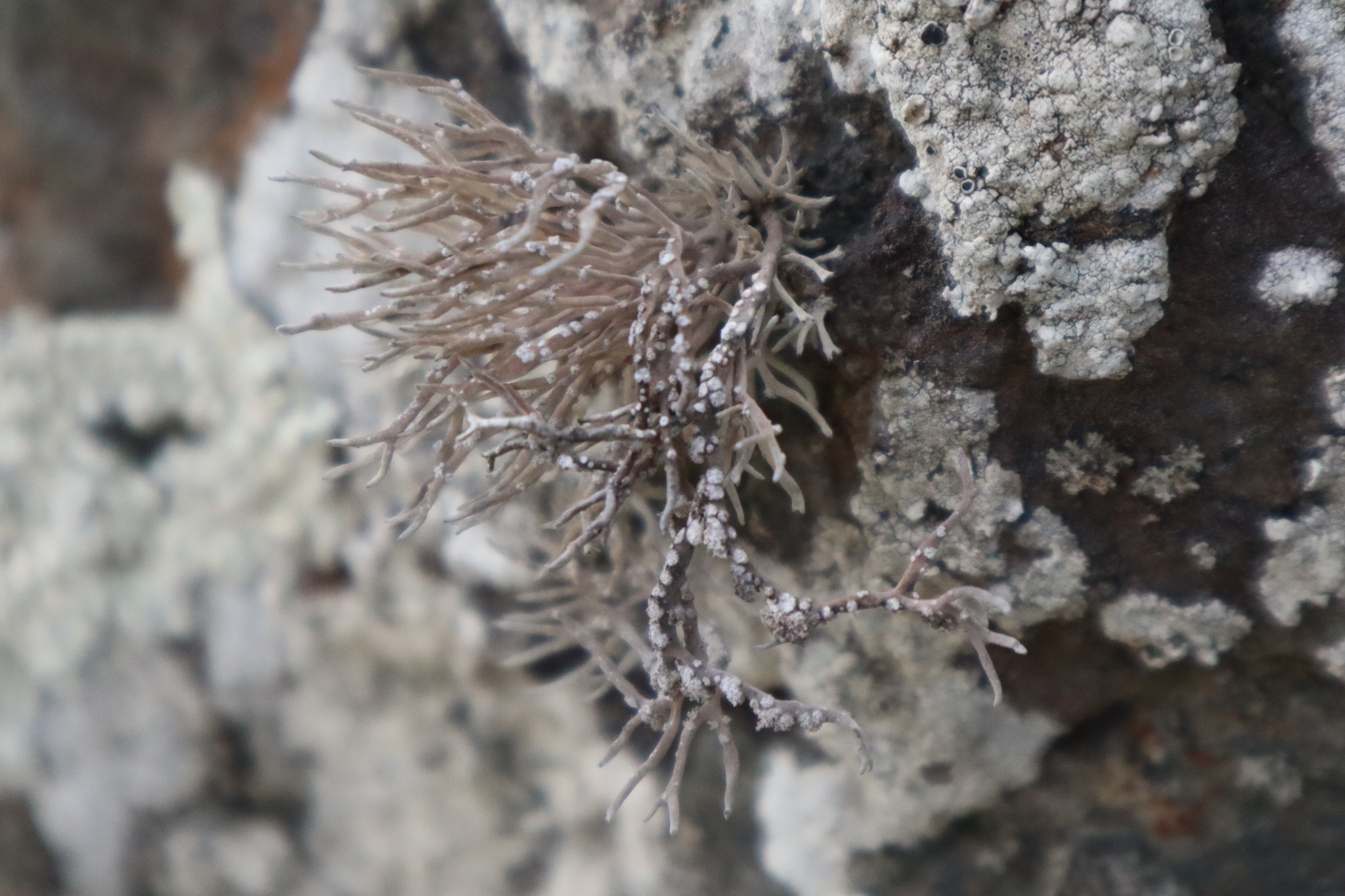

Scientific classification
- Kingdom: Fungi
- Division: Ascomycota
- Class: Arthoniomycetes
- Order: Arthoniales
- Family: Roccellaceae
- Genus: Roccella
- Species: R. phycopsis

Binomial name
- Roccella phycopsis (Ach.) Ach. (1810)

Synonyms
- List: Parmelia phycopsis Ach. (1804); Lecanora tinctoria (DC.) Czerwiak.; Lichen fucoides Dicks.; Lichen fucoides Neck.; Lichen phycopsis (Ach.) Ach.; Nemaria fucoides (Neck.) Navàs; Roccella canariensis var. vincentina (Vain.) Zahlbr. (1924); Roccella dichotoma (Pers.) Ach.; Roccella fastigiata Bory (1828); Roccella fucoides (Dicks.); Roccella fucoides (Neck.) Vain.; Roccella guanchica Feige & Viethen (1987); Roccella pusilla De Not.; Roccella pygmaea Durieu & Mont. (1847); Roccella tinctoria DC.; Roccella tuberculata var. vincentina Vain. (1901)

= Roccella phycopsis =

Species of lichen

Roccella phycopsis is a species of fruticose lichen in the family Roccellaceae. A study of Roccella phycopsis in Tunisia revealed that it contains methyl orcellinate, a chemical compound of interest for its anti-inflammatory activity.

== Description ==
Roccella phycopsis forms small, shrubby tufts up to about 5 cm tall. Each tuft is made of narrow branches that rise more or less vertically from the substrate. At first the branches are round in cross-section, though they can become slightly angular or flattened with age, and their uneven, irregular pattern of forking gives the lichen a rather untidy appearance. Fresh material is a pale blue-grey or buff, while the inner body (the medulla) shows a yellow tinge close to the base. Powdery reproductive patches called soralia are plentiful: they start as tiny warts on the branch surface, then expand into globular, flour-like masses that shed microscopic particles for asexual dispersal and give older thalli a frosted look.

Sexual fruit bodies (apothecia) are infrequent. When present they project conspicuously from the branches as rounded to elongated lumps, often twisted or misshapen. Unlike in many related lichens, the apothecia lack a rim of thallus tissue, so the whole disc is exposed and appears jet-black. Inside, the spore-bearing layer is threaded by support filaments (paraphysoids) that remain unbranched at the base but divide near the tip. Each sac (ascus) contains eight colourless ascospores that become faintly brown with age; the spores are three-celled, straight to gently curved, and measure roughly 18–21 × 4–6 μm (occasionally as small as 14 μm long or as large as 23 μm). Tiny flask-shaped structures produce curved, rod-like conidia 12–17 × about 1 μm, providing an additional means of reproduction. Standard chemical spot tests reveal a C+ (crimson) reaction in the outer cortex, no reaction in the soralia, and a blue-white fluorescence under long-wave ultraviolet light in the medulla, indicating erythrin, roccellic acid, and sometimes lecanoric acid.

== Potential biotechnological uses ==
Ben Salah and colleagues (2021) found that a simple water extract of the Roccella phycopsis can act as a natural "green" reagent for making silver nanoparticles in a single step. When the extract was mixed with silver nitrate solution the liquid quickly turned brown, and follow-up tests showed it now contained tiny, roughly spherical particles only about 15 nanometres wide. The suspension, rich in antioxidant phenolic compounds, was able to neutralise free radicals, stop the growth of the bacterium Escherichia coli at very low doses, and partly block the enzyme acetylcholinesterase.
