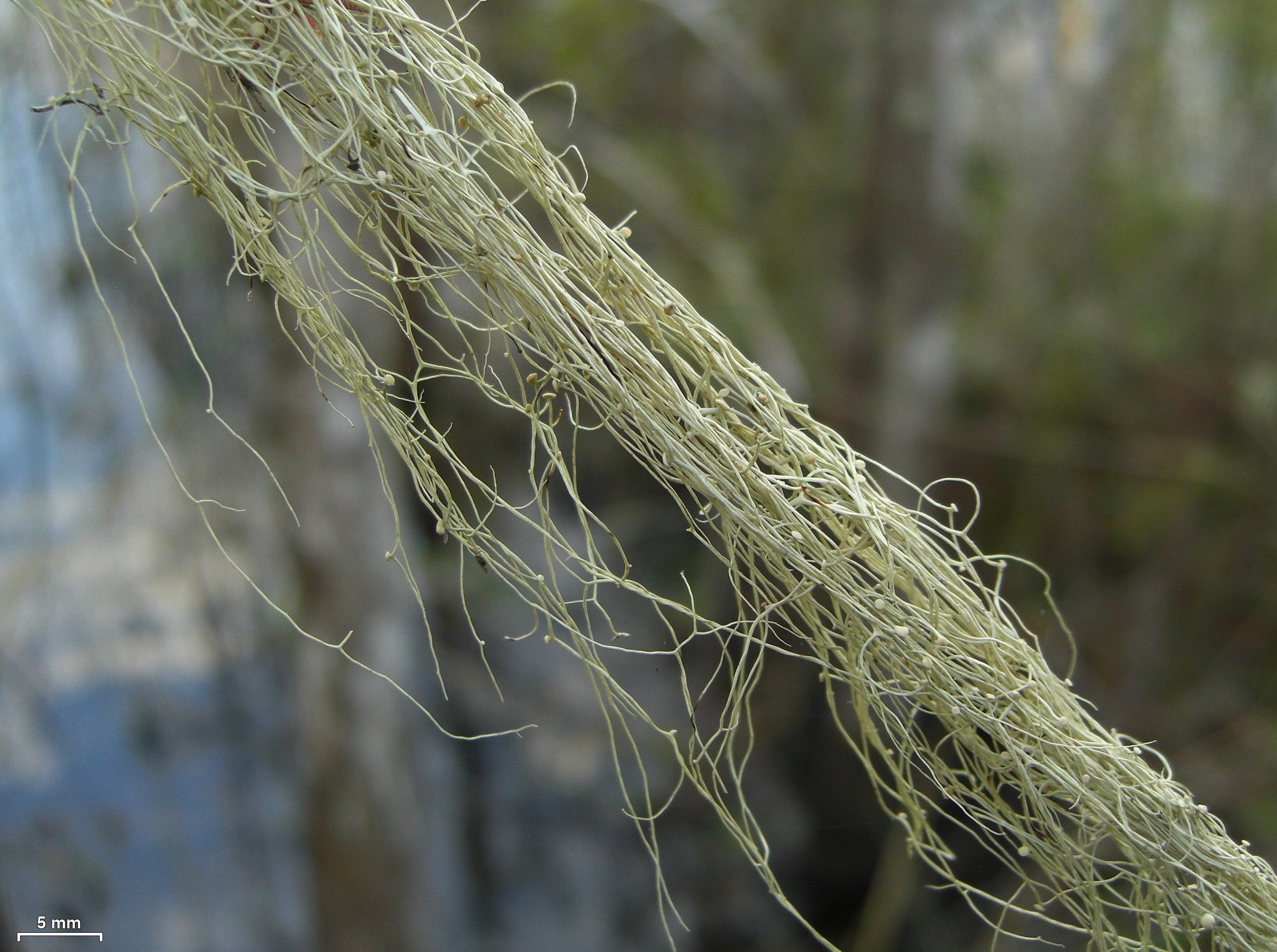

Scientific classification
- Kingdom: Fungi
- Division: Ascomycota
- Class: Lecanoromycetes
- Order: Lecanorales
- Family: Ramalinaceae
- Genus: Ramalina
- Species: R. usnea

Binomial name
- Ramalina usnea (L.) R.Howe (1914)

Synonyms
- Lichen usnea L. (1767); Parmelia usneoides Ach. (1803); Alectoria usneoides (Ach.) Ach. (1810); Ramalina usneoides (Ach.) Mont. (1837); Ramalina bogotensis Nyl. (1863); Ramalina subanceps Nyl. (1876)

= Ramalina usnea =

Species of lichen-forming fungus

Ramalina usnea is a species of corticolous (bark-dwelling), fruticose lichen in the family Ramalinaceae. It grows on tree bark across the Americas and parts of East Africa. Growing up to 30 cm (12 in) long, it forms pale greenish-grey branching strands that darken when dry. The species is highly adaptable: it forms coarse, flattened branches in foggy environments and develops finer, more delicate forms in humid coastal areas. First described by Carl Linnaeus in 1767, it underwent a few taxonomic revisions until Reginald Heber Howe, Jr. established its current name in 1914. Unlike many lichens that grow primarily at their tips, R. usnea expands along its entire length by continuously rebuilding its cell walls. It serves as an important component of some ecosystems, particularly in the Galápagos Islands' transition zones, where it forms characteristic draperies on trees and is used as nesting material by certain birds.

== Taxonomy ==
The lichen was first scientifically described by Carl Linnaeus in 1767 as Lichen usnea. In his protologue, Linnaeus characterised it as a filamentous, pendulous (hanging) lichen with a smooth, compressed thallus. He described the species as thread-like and branching, reaching up to a foot in length, with obtuse branch angles and a thallus that could separate into two layers. He noted that specimens were whitish when fresh but became grey-brown when dry. Linnaeus based part of his description on observations by the Dutch-born botanist Nikolaus Joseph von Jacquin, who had collected extensively in the Caribbean and documented the species growing on trees in Martinique, as well as reports of its presence in the East Indies, St. Helena, and Madagascar. It underwent several taxonomic changes over time. Erik Acharius reclassified it as Parmelia usneoides in 1803, and again in 1810 as Alectoria usneoides. Reginald Heber Howe, Jr. finally established its current name, Ramalina usnea, in 1914. The lectotype specimen (Linnaean Herbarium 1273-278), collected from Martinique, was designated by Henry Imshaug in 1972. Chemical analysis revealed that the type specimen contains usnic and divaricatic acids—a variant differing from earlier reports that identified only ramalinolic and sekikaic acids. It is also notable as the only confirmed historical collection of R. usnea from the Lesser Antilles, where the related species R. peranceps is now more commonly found.

A 1978 study revealed significant insights into the taxonomy of the R. usnea species complex. Three distinct chemical races were identified within R. usnea, each characterised by different substances in the medulla: a sekikaic acid race, a divaricatic acid race, and a race lacking diagnostic medullary compounds. This chemotaxonomic approach has been important in understanding the species' diversity.

Research has shown that R. subanceps and R. bogotensis are synonyms of R. usnea, representing different morphological expressions within the species' range of variation. The R. usnea complex has been found to comprise four distinct species: R. usnea, Ramalina anceps, Ramalina chilensis, and a newly described species, Ramalina sharpii. Some researchers have questioned the distinction between Ramalina usnea and R. anceps, suggesting that R. anceps may represent a chemotype of R. usnea. The two taxa are morphologically similar, with R. anceps appearing thinner and less contorted, but these characteristics are considered unreliable for species delimitation.

== Description ==
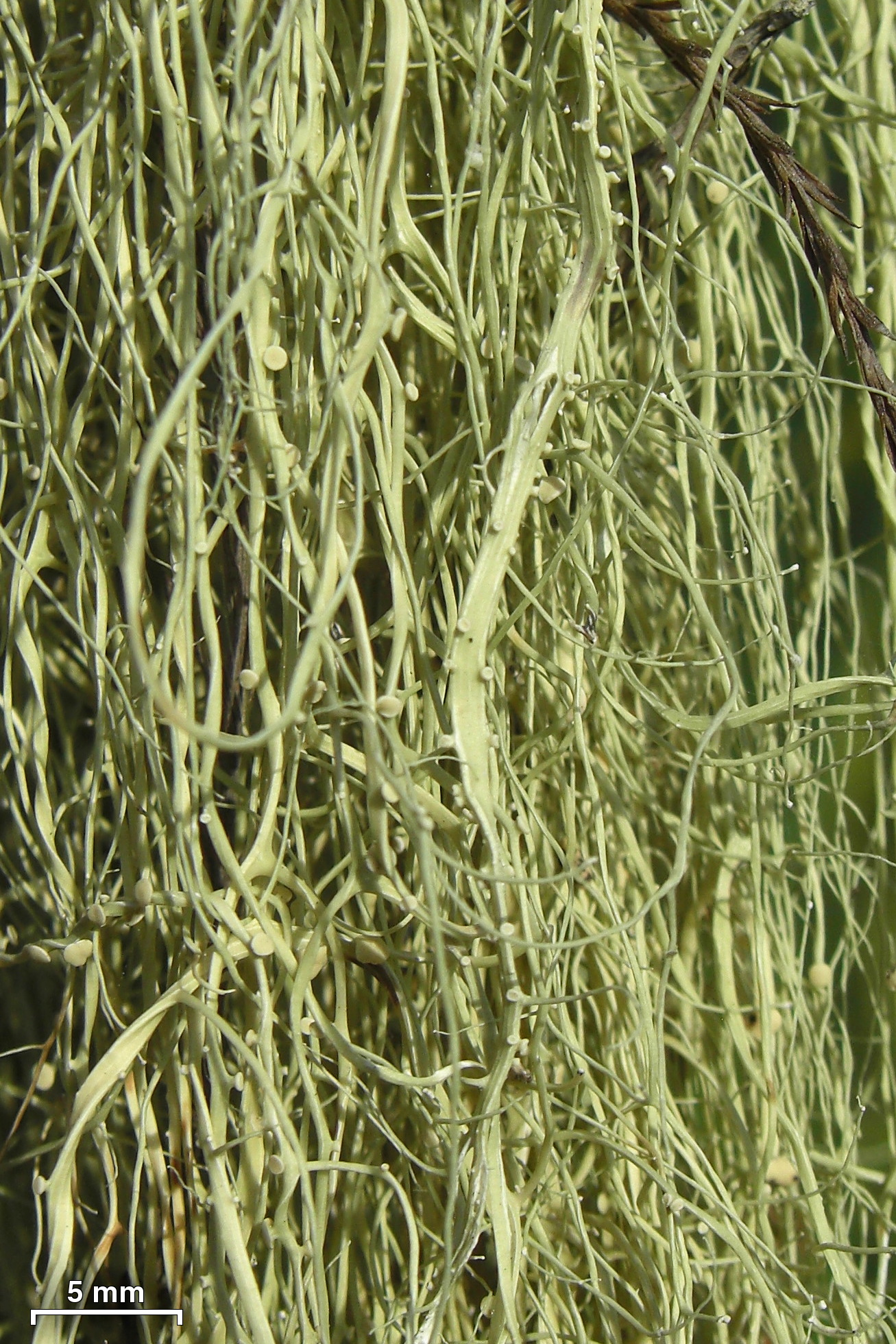
Pendulous, branching thalli of R. usnea showing characteristic flattened strands. Scale bar = 5 mm

The thallus is pendulous, reaching up to 30 cm (12 in) in length, with irregular branching and a solid (non-hollow) structure. Branches are typically flattened (though occasionally slightly cylindrical), often contorted, with apices that taper to a slender or rounded form, and measure 0.5–2.5 mm wide. Soredia are absent. Pseudocyphellae are linear in form, occurring both marginally and laminally. The cortex is more or less distinct, about 10 μm thick; chondroid tissue clearly and heavily cracked. Apothecia are common, marginal or laminal; the disc is flat, becoming convex with age; the thalline exciple is entire, without pseudocyphellae; hymenium 40–45 μm; subhymenium 20–30 μm; the proper exciple is 50–70 μm thick. Ascospores are long-fusiform, 2-celled, often with 3–6 additional septa, typically 18–22 by 3–4 μm.

== Similar species ==
Ramalina usnea can be distinguished from Usnea (bear lichen) species by its flattened, two-sided branches that lack a central cord of supporting tissue Several closely related species share morphological features with Ramalina usnea, forming what has been called the R. usnea complex. R. anceps is primarily found in the West Indies, where it grows in moist forests up to 900 m elevation. While it can be difficult to distinguish from finely-branched forms of R. usnea, it can usually be identified by its very shiny cortex, more terete (rounded) branches, general absence of striations, and more rigid, less twisted branch pattern. It also has distinctive chemistry, containing norstictic acid with salazinic acid. A variant, R. anceps var. peranceps, has somewhat more flattened and striated branches and contains only salazinic acid in its medulla.

Ramalina sharpii is restricted to pine-oak forests above 2000 m in the mountains of central Mexico. It is distinguished from R. usnea by its much broader branches, which can reach 2–30 mm in width, very prominent white striations, and longer thalli that can grow up to 100 cm. The species also differs in its medullary chemistry, containing norstictic acid with or without salazinic acid.

Ramalina chilensis is an endemic species of central and northern Chile, found in coastal habitats and on seaward slopes of coastal mountains where it is influenced by sea fogs. It differs from R. usnea in its shorter length, rarely exceeding 20 cm, and its consistently broad, flat branches with prominent white striations. The species has an unusual chemistry combining sekikaic acid and norstictic acid, and is restricted to Mediterranean climate areas of Chile.

Ramalina menziesii from California has sometimes been confused with R. usnea but can be readily distinguished by its distinctive net-like reticulate branching pattern. Additionally, R. menziesii is restricted to the Pacific Coast north of Sinaloa, Mexico, while R. usnea is not found in this region.

== Development ==
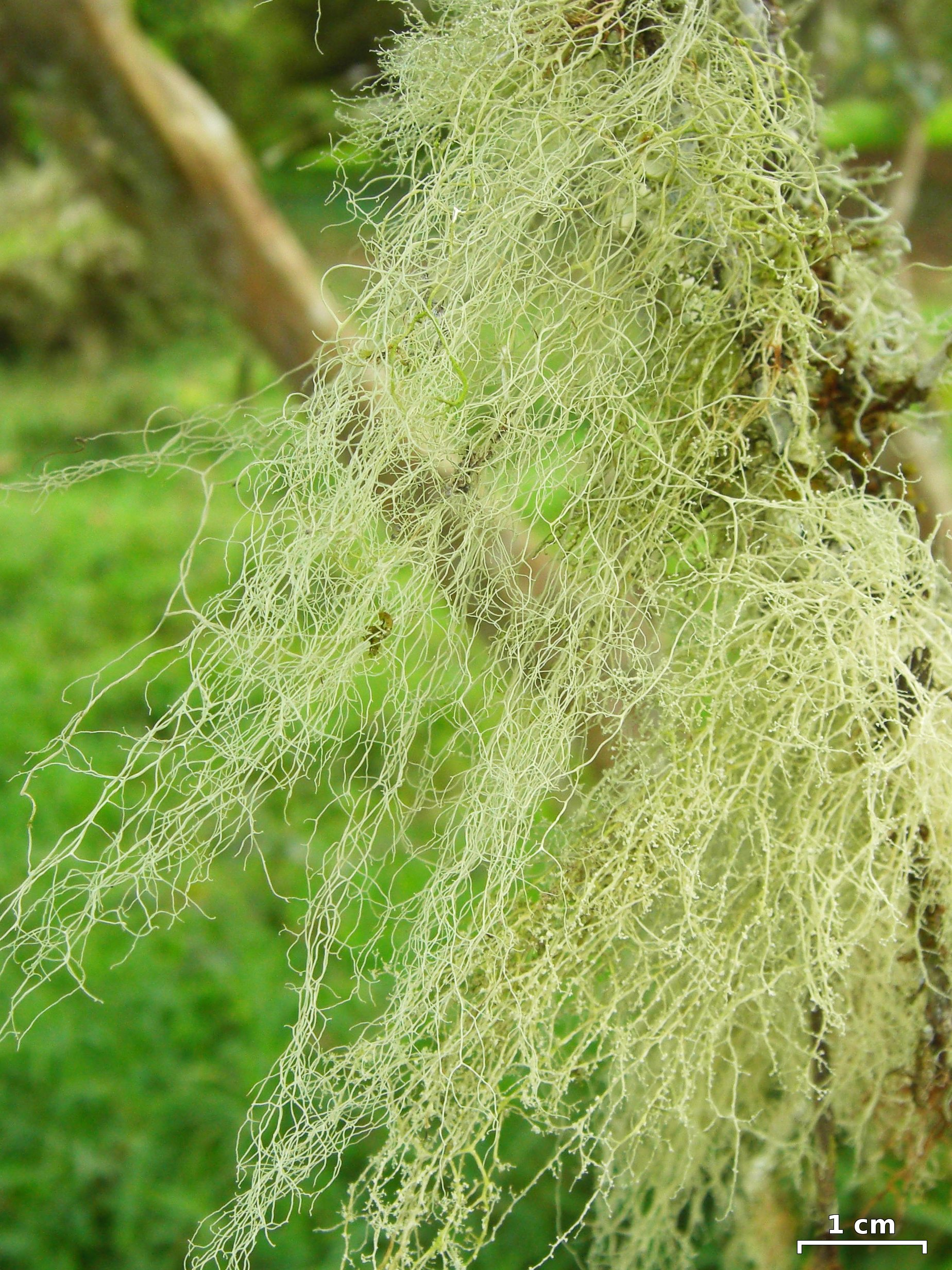
on branches in the highlands of Santa Cruz Island, Galápagos

The development and growth patterns of Ramalina usnea have been studied through field observations and microscopic analysis. Research has shown that growth occurs throughout the entire thallus rather than being limited to specific zones, a pattern known as diffuse growth. When measured over approximately one year, thallus segments showed length increases roughly proportional to their initial size, with some variation possibly related to seasonal conditions.

Transmission electron microscopy shows that diffuse growth in R. usnea is marked by a unique cell wall development: new layers are continually deposited near the protoplast while older layers become disrupted and mix with electron-transparent materials. This pattern differs significantly from typical fungal growth, where a single discrete cell wall is maintained. In R. usnea, the cell walls are instead repeatedly disrupted and replaced during tissue expansion, with new structural components being deposited to their interior at the interface with the protoplast. This type of development has been previously documented in the lichens Ramalina menziesii and Usnea longissima.

New branches arise from small buds on mature tissue, typically emerging near pseudocyphellae and at fracture points along the thallus. These buds begin as minute swellings on the edges of existing branches and develop an inrolled apex (curved inward at the tip) that persists as the branch elongates. The species shows no evidence of apical branching through bifurcation, unlike some related species.

The thallus cortex consists of densely packed fungal cells with very thick walls, oriented parallel to the branch axis. These cortical cells are distinctive in having cell walls that occupy significantly more volume than their cellular contents. When viewed in cross-section, the cells appear to be grouped in bundles, suggesting that new cells grow within the wall material of older neighboring cells. This pattern of continued cell wall accumulation may enable the mature tissue to maintain its capacity for elongation growth.

Unlike many other lichens where growth is primarily restricted to the margins or tips, R. usnea exhibits growth throughout its structure. The thallus can fragment easily, particularly in its finer portions, with new branches often developing from the broken ends. This process can result in the formation of a sympodial growth pattern, where the main axis is built from a series of successive branches.

== Habitat and distribution ==
Ramalina usnea has a broad distribution throughout the Western Hemisphere. In North America, it occurs from southern Florida and Texas in the United States, extending south through the West Indies, Mexico, and Central America into northern South America. Along the South American continent, it is found from the northern regions southward along the east coast through Brazil, Paraguay, and Uruguay to northern Argentina. The species has also been reported from several locations in the Old World, with populations documented in East Africa that closely resemble the American specimens.

The species shows considerable morphological variation in response to its environment. For example, in foggy, high-elevation areas it forms coarse thalli with broad, flattened branches, while in humid coastal regions it develops finer, more delicate structures. These striations may serve an adaptive function in water uptake from fog. In contrast, populations in tropical coastal areas of Central America and insular habitats in the West Indies and Galápagos Islands, where fog is rare but relative humidity remains consistently high, tend to develop finer, more delicate branching patterns. In the Galápagos Islands, R. usnea is especially abundant in the transition zone, thriving in semi-arid conditions influenced by coastal fog. It is commonly found on shrubs and trees, forming dense, pendulous masses. The species is particularly associated with Psidium galapageium forests, where it drapes over branches, creating a characteristic feature of this habitat.

Three main chemical variants (races) of R. usnea exist across its range. The sekikaic acid race (usually with homosekikaic acid) is the most abundant and occurs throughout the species' distribution. The divaricatic acid race is most common in Colombia and Venezuela, occurs in the Galápagos Islands, and is found through the West Indies to Florida, but appears absent from Central America and eastern South America. A race lacking diagnostic medullary compounds is found over most of the geographic range and is particularly abundant in eastern South America.

== Ecology ==
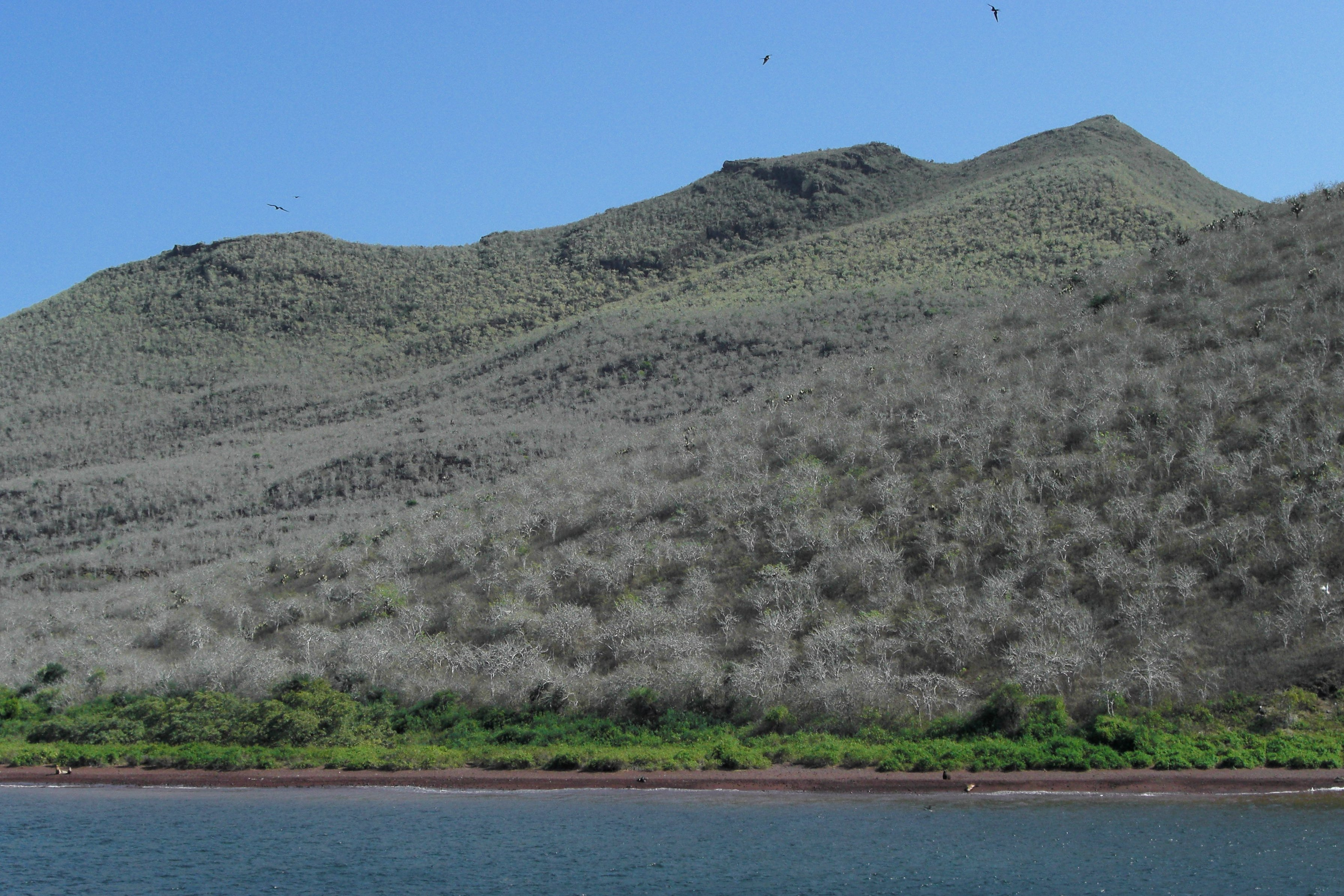
Palo Santo trees (on Rábida Island, Galápagos) showing faint green line indicating Ramalina usnea growth at top

Research indicates that R. usnea shows morphological plasticity—modifying its form in response to fog and wind exposure—to enhance water capture and gain a competitive edge in its habitat. When growing on columnar substrates in fog-influenced environments, the lichen's thalli show distinct variations in form depending on their position. On leeward (sheltered) sides, R. usnea thalli become significantly more pendulous and longer, reaching lengths of nearly 6 cm, while windward-facing thalli remain shorter at around 3 cm and more erect. This morphological variation appears to be an adaptation for harvesting water droplets from foggy air, with the more pendulous forms better suited to capturing moisture in turbulent airflow conditions.

This adaptability may give R. usnea a competitive advantage in certain microhabitats. Research in fog-influenced desert environments has shown that R. usnea tends to dominate the leeward sides of its substrate, where its pendulous growth form is better suited to the local airflow patterns. These morphological responses occur over very small spatial scales, demonstrating the species' ability to adapt to fine-scale environmental gradients.

In addition to its morphological plasticity, R. usnea plays a role in avian ecology by serving as a nesting material for certain bird species. In northeastern Argentina, the tropical parula (Setophaga pitiayumi) constructs its nests within masses of R. usnea, utilising the lichen's filamentous and pendulous structure as a secure attachment point. Some researchers suggest that this preference may not only be due to structural support but also to the potential antiparasitic properties of the lichen, as it contains usnic acid, a secondary metabolite with antimicrobial and antifungal activity. In the Galápagos Islands, R. usnea is a dominant epiphyte in the transition zone, where arid lowlands merge into humid interior zones at elevations between 80–250 m. The species frequently coexists with other fog-adapted epiphytes such as Usnea longissima and Teloschistes flavicans. It often forms extensive, pale-green pendulous growths on trees such as Psidium galapageium. The lichen's abundance in fog-exposed environments suggests it plays a role in moisture capture. Some species of Darwin's finches incorporate R. usnea into their nests, possibly for structural support or antimicrobial benefits.

== See also ==
- List of lichens named by Carl Linnaeus
- List of Ramalina species
