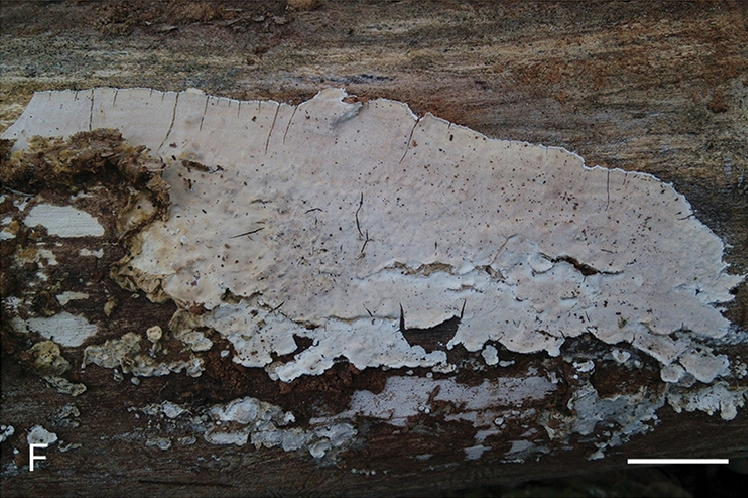

Scientific classification
- Domain: Eukaryota
- Kingdom: Fungi
- Division: Basidiomycota
- Class: Agaricomycetes
- Order: Polyporales
- Family: Polyporaceae
- Genus: Lopharia
- Species: L. cinerascens

Binomial name
- Lopharia cinerascens (Schwein.) G.Cunn. (1956)

Synonyms
- Thelephora cinerascens Schwein. (1832)

= Lopharia cinerascens =

Species of fungus

Lopharia cinerascens is a species of crust fungus in the family Polyporaceae. It was first described by botanist Lewis David de Schweinitz in 1832 as Thelephora cinerascens. Gordon Herriot Cunningham transferred it to Lopharia in 1956. It is widely distributed in Africa, Asia, Australasia, and North America; it is less common in Europe and South America.
