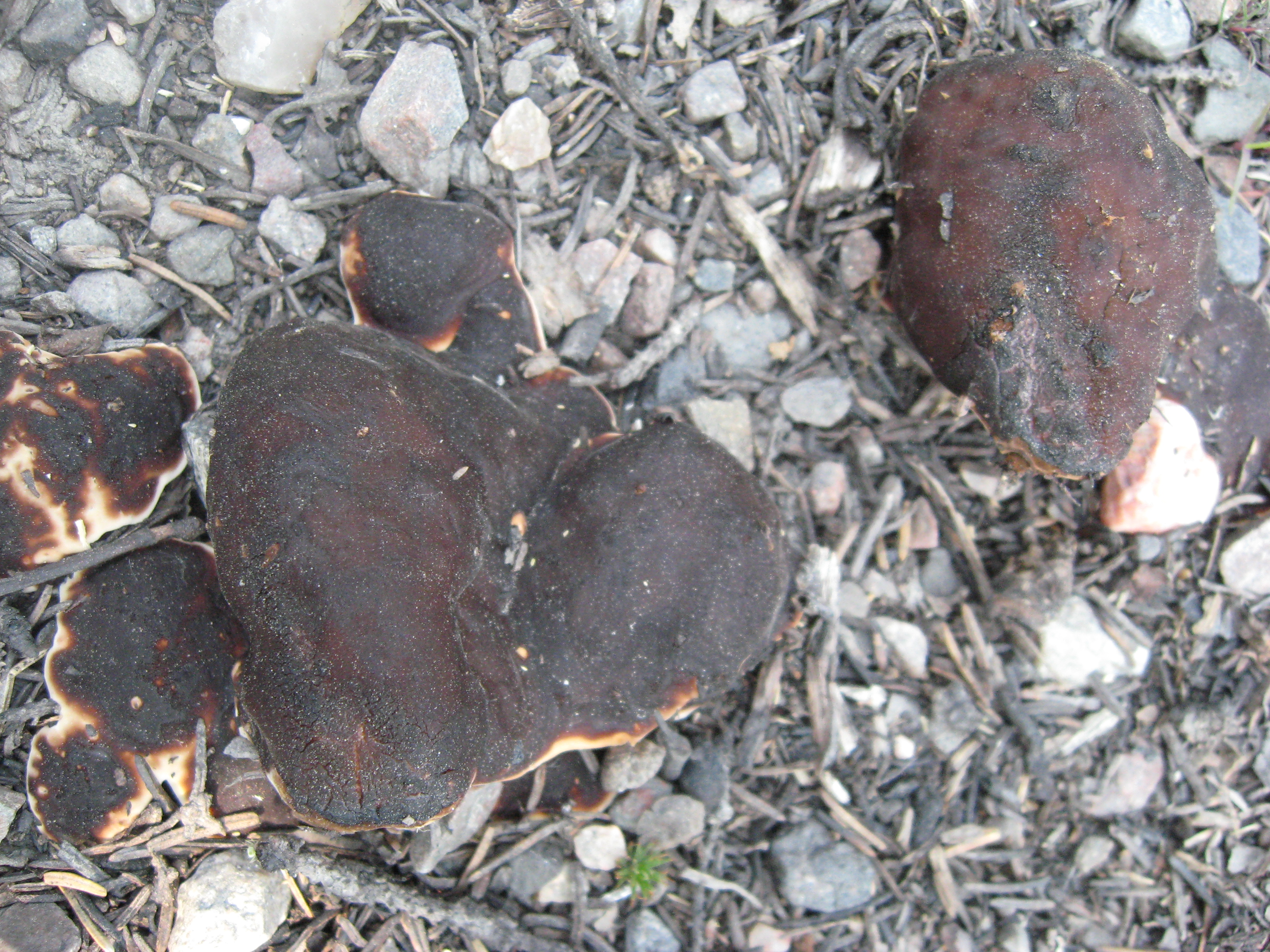
- Rhizina undulata

Scientific classification
- Domain: Eukaryota
- Kingdom: Fungi
- Division: Ascomycota
- Class: Pezizomycetes
- Order: Pezizales
- Family: Rhizinaceae
- Genus: Rhizina; Fr. (1815)

Type species
- Rhizina undulata Fr. (1815)

Species
- R. atra R. lignicola R. undulata

= Rhizina =

Genus of fungi

Rhizina is a genus of ascomycete fungi in the order Pezizales. The genus was circumscribed by Elias Magnus Fries in his 1815 work Observationes mycologicae, with R. undulata as the type species. R. atra and R. lignicola were added to the genus in 1921 and 1925, respectively, by Australian botanist Leonard Rodway.
