= Alphonse Boistel =

Alphonse Barthélémy Martin Boistel (24 December 1836, Paris – 21 September 1908) was a French law professor, who performed research in the fields of geology and lichenology.

He studied law at Collège Rollin and at the University of Paris, obtaining his law degree in 1864. From 1865 to 1870 he served as a professor to the faculty of law at Grenoble, then afterwards returned to Paris, where he was a professor of commercial law (1870–79) and civil law (1879–1907).

As a lichenologist, he was the author of "Nouvelle flore des lichens pour la détermination facile des espèces" (2 volumes, 1896–1902). In 1906 he was named president of the Société géologique de France.
