= Ramalina polymorpha =

Scientific classification
- Kingdom: Fungi
- Division: Ascomycota
- Class: Lecanoromycetes
- Order: Lecanorales
- Family: Ramalinaceae
- Genus: Ramalina
- Species: R. polymorpha

Binomial name
- Ramalina polymorpha (Lilj.) Ach. (1810)

Synonyms
- Lichen calicaris var. polymorphus Lilj. (1792); Lichen polymorphus (Lilj.) Ach. (1797); Parmelia polymorpha (Lilj.) Ach. (1803); Parmelia polymorpha var. emplecta Ach. (1803); Parmelia polymorpha (Lilj.) Ach. (1803); Physcia polymorpha (Lilj.) DC. (1815); Ramalina polymorpha f. emplecta (Ach.) Ach. (1810); Ramalina polymorpha var. emplecta (Ach.) Ach. (1810); Ramalina scopulorum var. polymorpha (Lilj.) Mudd

Species of lichen-forming fungus

Ramalina polymorpha is a strap lichen species. It is native to Europe and also occurs scatered in north America. The oxidative and cytogenetic effects of R. polymorpha water extract when introduced into human blood cells has been studied for potential use in the pharmaceutical industry or as a dietary supplement.

== See also ==
- List of Ramalina species
