= Niebla spatulata =

Scientific classification
- Kingdom: Fungi
- Division: Ascomycota
- Class: Lecanoromycetes
- Order: Lecanorales
- Family: Ramalinaceae
- Genus: Niebla
- Species: N. spatulata

Binomial name
- Niebla spatulata Spjut (1996)

Species of lichen

Niebla spatulata is a fruticose lichen that grows on small rocks along the foggy Pacific Coast of central Baja California in the Vizcaíno Desert. The epithet, spatulata is in reference to the flattened branches of the thallus, in contrast to another similar species, Niebla flabellata.

== Distinguishing features ==
Niebla spatulata is characterized by a fragile thallus divided into irregularly flattened tufted branches spreading from a yellowish orange pigmented holdfast, to 5 cm high and 5 cm across, and by containing the lichen substance hypoprotocetraric acid (without triterpenes but with other unknowns), and by its relatively thin cortex, 35–50(-100) μm thick, in contrast to 45–75 μm thick in Niebla josecuervoi, which also differs by the cylindrical-prismatic branches. The branches of N. spatulata rarely show any definite shape, appearing entirely ribbon-like, or often partly ribbon-like with irregularly dilated parts, or occasionally entirely dilated and variously torn along the margins, all variations seen on a single thallus. Black dot like pycnidia are common and conspicuous along the branch margins and cortical ridges, and at branch tips, their prominence undoubtedly related to the relatively thin cortex.

Niebla spatulata is most similar to Niebla flabellata, which appears distinguishable only by its secondary metabolite, salazinic acid. Niebla flabellata is a widely distributed species in the Vizcaíno Desert of Baja California, whereas N. spatulata is of localized occurrence within the range of N. flabellata. Several other widely distributed species that contain salazinic acid in Baja California have related chemotype species that are also of localized occurrence; they are the acid deficient Niebla homaleoides as may be related to Niebla josecuervoi (salazinic acid), the protocetraric acid Niebla pulchribarbara as related to Niebla effusa and Niebla arenaria (salazinic acid), and the hypoprotocetric acid Niebla brachyura compared to N. arenaria. The localized species are largely allopatric in their distribution in Baja California. On a wider geographical scale, depsidone species, which occur only in Baja California, are within the wider geographical range of the depside species that extend to California and to Guadalupe Island.

Although Niebla spatulata has so far been found only with N. flabellata, Niebla pulchribarbara (protocetraric acid) occurs with Niebla palmeri, which differs in having sekikaic acid; both are rare terricolous species with less related lichen biogenetically metabolites, while they are also morphologically similar. There are many other examples of less chemically related species that appear morphologically alike and occur together; e.g., Niebla flabellata (salazinic acid) and Niebla caespitosa (divaricatic acid); Spjut 9073. Terricolous species, which are common in Baja California, are rare in California. They occur primarily on San Nicolas Island. The secondary metabolites as related to terricolous habit show biogeographical relationships, therefore, are also considered to have taxonomic significance in the genus Niebla.

== Taxonomic history ==
Niebla spatulata was first collected in the Sierra Hornitos on the Vizcaíno Peninsula, about 5 miles northwest of Bahía Tortugas, 17 May 1986 on white calcareous substrate (shown in Spjut's taxonomic revision of the genus Niebla, Plate 3A). It was later collected on Cedros Island and on the northern peninsula about 40 miles north of Guerrero Negro. The species (N. spatulata) has also been indicated to belong to a broad spectrum of morphological and chemical variation under a single species, Niebla josecuervoi. based on the premise that morphological variation in Niebla, as defined by Spjut, is environmentally induced, and that the chemical variation in the lichen metabolites is chemosyndromic, but all of this remains to be determined, while there have also been inconsistencies noted for the taxonomic treatment under a broad species concept.
