= Niebla dissecta =

Scientific classification
- Kingdom: Fungi
- Division: Ascomycota
- Class: Lecanoromycetes
- Order: Lecanorales
- Family: Ramalinaceae
- Genus: Niebla
- Species: N. dissecta

Binomial name
- Niebla dissecta Spjut (1996)

Species of lichen

Niebla dissecta is a fruticose lichen that grows on rocks along the Pacific coast of California, in San Mateo County and in the Channel Islands. The epithet dissecta is in reference to the thallus repeatedly divided into branches.

== Distinguishing features ==
Niebla dissecta is recognized by the thallus broader than tall—not more than 4 cm high, divided into many narrow partly subterete but mostly irregular 3-angled branches that arise from a common attachment area, blackened slightly around the base to a short distance above, the 3 longitudinal ridges spirally twisted 90° at frequent but irregular intervals, the primary branches often more compressed and broader where they divide more or less equally into secondary branches that ultimately divide again and spread as much as 180°. Lichen substances are sekikaic acid, with accessory triterpenes, in contrast to divaricatic acid in Niebla testudinaria. Determination of the secondary metabolites helps distinguish these species in the Channel Islands (Santa Cruz Island) and in the Santa Ynez Mountains where they appear morphologically intermediate. The branches of the intermediate or putative hybrid is not as clearly 3-ridged, twist more frequently, and have smaller and more frequent crater-like depressions between the longitudinal ridges (see also Photo 38.6 in Spjut 1996).

The type (biology) specimen of Niebla dissecta also appears to be a hybrid or intermediate form to Niebla disrupta. It has the relatively broad thallus, the 3-angled branches, the dilated branching node-like areas (plant stem), and the wide spreading terminal branches that characterizes the species, but unlike the Channel Island specimens, its longitudinal ridges are more sharply angled, and the subterminal apothecia have extended branches as seen in N. disrupta.

As in most species of Niebla, there is a common set of morphological traits shared throughout the range of a species, while one or more of the individual character features may vary from one location to another; as a result the individual species have been referred to as shape shifters. The variation appears related to the associated species. Niebla dissecta is just one example that also includes a morph similar to Niebla cornea (Photo 9.4 in Spjut 1996).

The association of Niebla species at each geographical location might be viewed as the Niebla collective in that each appears to have a unique set of morphological and chemical features not seen at other locations, the exceptions being the isidiate species and those that appear to be recent colonizers or occur at the extreme range of the genus (see p. 20–24 in Spjut, 1996). For example, there are two distinct species of Niebla on San Nicolas Island without intermediate morphological forms, Niebla ramosissima and Niebla dactylifera. Both contain depsides; one has sekikaic acid, the other divaricatic acid.

However, the morphological variation in Niebla is also viewed has highly “plastic.” The 42 species recognized in the genus are treated as just three species. Two of the species, Niebla homalea and Niebla josecuervoi, are distinguished by chemistry, depsidones (Niebla josecuervoi) and depsides (Niebla homalea), which also includes the acid deficient Niebla homaleoides considered to be more related to species with depsidones; N. dissecta is included in the depside group. This view implies that there are no geographical patterns to the morphological variation; i.e., the morphological variation is purely random due to genetic and environmental factors. But it is not random; the California Nieblas with sekikaic acid, which are more common in the Channel Islands than on the mainland, exhibit an evolutionary pattern in the Channel Islands from sparingly branched thalli with prismatic branch forms (Niebla siphonoloba), to uniformly dissected thalli (N. dissecta), to thalli more densely branched near apex (N. dactylifera).

== Taxonomic history ==
Niebla dissecta was recognized as a result of a taxonomic revision of the genus Niebla undertaken for producing a lichen flora of Baja California that began in 1986. A peer review of a manuscript in 1990-1991 led to further study of material in California. Of particular importance was the collection by Charis Bratt from the Channel Islands that are deposited at the Santa Barbara Museum of Natural History. The type (biology) specimen was chosen from the specimens of Niebla at the United States National Herbarium (Smithsonian Institution); it was collected from the mainland in San Mateo County. As indicated above N. dissecta is also included under an extremely variable species concept, Niebla homalea.
