= Niebla fimbriata =

Scientific classification
- Kingdom: Fungi
- Division: Ascomycota
- Class: Lecanoromycetes
- Order: Lecanorales
- Family: Ramalinaceae
- Genus: Niebla
- Species: N. fimbriata

Binomial name
- Niebla fimbriata Spjut (1996)

Species of lichen

Niebla fimbriata is a fruticose lichen that grows on volcanic rocks in the Channel Islands of California and along the foggy Pacific Coast of Baja California from near San Antonio del Mar south to Arroyo Sauces, which is located south of Punta Canoas. The epithet, fimbriata is in reference to the fringed branches of the thallus.

== Distinguishing features ==
Niebla fimbriata is recognized by the thallus divided into subterete branches from a central attachment point, reaching a height of 6 cm while spreading out as much as 10 cm across; the branches seem to bend backwards as they grow, producing a fringe of narrow branchlets along both margins of a primary branch, all pointing in the same direction—upwards, the whole branch with its branchlets resembling the lobster body on its back with the legs pointing up, but branchlets may also fall off, leaving the margins of the primary branch to appear with rudimentary crinkled branchlets. Black dot-like pycnidia are scattered and immersed along the margins and cortical ridges, or they may be conspicuous and abundant in some thalli. The cortex is rather thick in covering a partially hollow medulla (“subfistulose”), 100–150(-200) μm thick, olive green in color with smooth, reticulate or honeycomb-like areas. Apothecia are born on the narrow branchlets. Lichen substances are sekikaic acid, with triterpenes.

Niebla fimbriata is relatively infrequent and widely scattered in its occurrence. At the type locality (mesa above San Antionio del Mar) it was found with two rare species of Niebla, Niebla pulchribarbara, Niebla versiforma, in association with common species, Niebla juncosa, Niebla josecuervoi, Niebla arenaria, and Niebla effusa on lava among a low mixed chaparral desert succulent transition scrub that included Agave shawii, Dudleya ingens, Ferocactus spp. Mammillaria dioica, Frankenia palmeri, Eriogonum fastigiatum, and Rosa minutifolia. This area is just north of Punta Colonet, not between Ensenada and Tijuana where there has been active Real Estate development.

== Taxonomic history ==
Niebla fimbriata was first recognized in Baja California as a result of pursuing a lichen flora of that region; the type (biology) specimen was collected from San Antonio del Mar, 13 April 1990. It was later found in a lichen collection from Charis Bratt, now at the Santa Barbara Museum of Natural History, reportedly collected on Santa Cruz Island.

Niebla fimbriata exhibits geographical variation that is suggested to be related to hybridization. In the Channel Islands intermediates are evident with Niebla siphonoloba and on the Baja California peninsula with Niebla juncosa. A third variant that occurs near Punta Canoas is notably different in the branches densely covered with short isidia-like branchlets.

It may be noted that Niebla fimbriata has been treated as belonging to a broad spectrum of morphological and chemical variation in Niebla homalea that includes many different species of Niebla and Vermilacinia.
