= Niebla testudinaria =

Scientific classification
- Kingdom: Fungi
- Division: Ascomycota
- Class: Lecanoromycetes
- Order: Lecanorales
- Family: Ramalinaceae
- Genus: Niebla
- Species: N. testudinaria

Binomial name
- Niebla testudinaria (Nyl.) Spjut (1996)

Species of lichen

Niebla testudinaria is a fruticose lichen that grows on rocks along the foggy Pacific Coast of North America, from Marin County, California to just south of Tijuana in Baja California, in the Channel Islands (Santa Cruz Island) in California, and Isla San Martín and Guadalupe Island in Baja California The epithet, testudinaria given by William Nylander in 1870, is probably in reference to the dilated branch with a reticulated surface, similar to a tortoise shell.

== Distinguishing features ==
Niebla testudinaria is distinguished by a broad hemispherical thallus divided into many branches that spread widely above a narrow base where attached to a reddish orange pigmented holdfast, collectively appearing as a tangled mass to 7 cm high and 5 cm broad; the branches dividing frequently above base, more or less equal in length but often unequal in how they spread apart and in direction, often abruptly bent in changing direction of growth, especially the uppermost branches, often oblong to linear-prismatic between branch intervals, frequently with dilated segments, asymmetrically elliptical in shape (bulging more on one side), occasional thalli with branches strongly flattened. The species (N. testudinaria) also recognized by the protruding reticulate vein-like ridges in the cortex as seen between branch margins, the cortex also appearing dull to slightly glossy along marginal ridges, relatively thick, 75–150 μm thick. Pycnidia proment but often widely scattered. Apothecia developing near ends of branches, solitary or in small aggregates. Divaricatic acid is the key lichen substances, with triterpenes.

Similar species include Niebla homalea, Niebla eburnea, Niebla caespitosa, Niebla disrupta, and Niebla dissecta. The latter two (N. disrupta, N. dissecta) differ in having sekikaic acid.

Niebla homalea is often difficult to distinguish from N. testudinaria. The key taxonomic character to recognizing N. homalea has been the obscure reticulate cortical ridges between the branch margins, in which the obscurity appears related to an extra glossy layer above the normal two-layered cortex, referred to as an “epicortex”; however, the more frequent development of transverse cracks also distinguishes N. homalea. This may be related to a different developmental pattern in cortical hyphae. which is scarcely visible, except on Guadalupe Island where thalli have a glossy cortex with prominent transverse ridges less frequently cracked. Additional character features for distinguishing N. homalea are branches that are mostly erect and closely parallel (“fastigiate”), and are often more curved than abruptly bent near apex. These features may also relate to the frequent transverse ridges, in contrast to the shorter reticulate hyphal ridges seen in thalli of N. testudinaria.

Niebla caespitosa has a similar reticulate cortex to N. testudinaria but differs in its thickness, (25-)45–75 μm thick. The thinner cortex in this species (N. caespitosa) is undoubtedly related to its crinkled margins, to the more sharply delineated cortical ridges, and to the more recessed cortical surface between the ridges.

Niebla eburnea differs in its pastry like smooth cortex, and in the branches twisted near base, in contrast to the frequent twisting of the longitudinal ridges as related to a change in the orientation of the branch margins in N. testudindaria

== Taxonomic history ==
William Nylander described Niebla testudinaria as a species of Ramalina (R. testudinaria) occurring on rocks (saxicolous) and branches of shrubs and trees (corticolous lichen) in California among a small group of related species that included R. ceruchis reported to occur on rocks and shrubs (and cacti) in South America (=Vermilacinia ceruchis), R. combeoides (=Vermilacinia combeoides) on rocks in North America, R. homalea (=Niebla homalea) on rocks around San Francisco, and R. flaccescens (=Vermilacinia flaccescens) on shrubs in South America.

In 1913, R. Heber Howe Jr. defined Ramalina testudinaria (= Niebla testudinaria) more narrowly by the dilated branches and by the development of terminal aggregate apothecia. He recognized an additional variety, var. intermedia, that had been described by Johannes Mueller Argoviensis (of Aargau) in 1882; both regarded as occurring only on rocks, in contrast to the shrub thalli that were considered to belong to R. ceruchis by the teretiform branches. Niebla homalea was distinguished by having lateral apothecia and a smooth cortical surface. Except for the taxonomic key and comments, his detailed descriptions of the species were largely extracted from Nylander's (1870) monograph. The occurrence of R. ceruchis (= Vermilacinia ceruchis) in North America had been earlier reported by Edward Tuckerman; however, Tuckerman had recognized the South American species—that grew on rocks, sand, and shrubs—as belonging to a single species, R. ceruchis, whereas Nylander soon after distinguished an additional species, R. flaccescens, in South America. Howe subsequently suggested that R. flaccescens (= Vermilacinia flaccescens) also occurred in North America, based on a specimen collected by Edward Palmer in the vicinity of San Diego.

In 1972, Phillip Rundel and Peter Bowler, following a series of papers on the chemistry of the “Ceruchis Group”, reported that Niebla testudinaria (as Desmazieria testudinaria) was a synonym (of D. homalea), citing a paper they were publishing in a 1973 issue of The Bryologist—“The correct citations for Desmazieria homalea and D. ceruchis” (= Niebla homalea, = Vermilacinia ceruchis); however, the paper did not appear. Thus, Niebla testudinaria was still regarded a distinct species. Further, N. testudinaria was not mentioned in their 1978 summary of the species in the genus; however, it was indicated that they were preparing a forthcoming monograph on Niebla. In 1994, Bowler, Rundel and their collaborators described additional species of Niebla, but again the status of N. testudinaria was not mentioned.

In 1996, Richard Spjut distinguished Niebla testudinaria from N. homalea based on the differences in the cortex as described by Nylander—the reticulate pattern of N. testudinaria vs. the smooth cortex of N. homalea—and also by the apothecia flattened to the branch as previously indicated by Howe. Of additional importance is the lichen substance of divaricatic acid. Upon determination of the secondary metabolite, divaricatic acid, Niebla testudinaria can be recognized by the crooked wide-spreading branches, which become shortly divided near apex, in contrast to N. homalea with fastigate branches that often have terminally divided branches of unequal length.

Bowler and Janet Marsh in 2004 included Niebla testudinaria under a broad species concept of Niebla homalea, one that encompasses a wider spectrum of chemical and morphological variation found in Baja California; a concept that views N. homalea as one of only three species in the genus as defined by Spjut, two species distinguished by the medulla reaction to para-phenylenediamine, depsidones (pd+, Niebla josecuervoi), depsides (pd-, N. homalea) and one species recognized by isidia (isidium) (Niebla isidiaescens), The taxonomic treatment for the broad species and genus concepts has many inconsistencies.
