= Niebla undulata =

Scientific classification
- Kingdom: Fungi
- Division: Ascomycota
- Class: Lecanoromycetes
- Order: Lecanorales
- Family: Ramalinaceae
- Genus: Niebla
- Species: N. undulata

Binomial name
- Niebla undulata Spjut (1996)

Species of lichen

Niebla undulata is a fruticose lichen that grows on rocks in the fog zone along the Pacific Coast of Baja California in the Northern Vizcaíno Desert, and also in the Channel Islands (Santa Cruz Island). The epithet, undulata, is in reference to the wavy margins of the thallus.

== Distinguishing features ==
Niebla undulata is distinguished by a bluish green thallus to 6 cm high and 6 cm broad, divided into curly ribbon-like branches from a short tubular base, and by the presence of the lichen metabolite divaricatic acid, with triterpenes. The primary branches, which are less than 20 in number, are loosely connected at base to a yellowish pigmented holdfast, blackened slightly above base, curved upwards or widely spread apart, sometimes horizontally to the extent that they creep along the rock, and they are undulate both broadly and shortly along margins. The undulate margins appear related to the development of black dot-like pyncidia (Note: Pycnidium (pycnidia plural) is a small flash-shaped structure, generally 200–350 μm long in Niebla, that produces conidia which escape through an opening (ostiole) at the top and function in reproduction, asexually or sexually) or by the development of apothecia (ascocarp). The cortex is relatively thin, 35–75(-100) μm thick, with prominent raised vein-like ridges, the longitudinal ridges not defining the branch margins, interconnected by diagonal ridges that fork and join other diagonal ridges, all forming a reticulate net. The relatively thin cortex also relates to the contorted branches as seen in other species. Apothecia are variable in their density along margins, occasionally solitary, more often aggregate, the individual apothecium generally appears as if pinched outwards from the branch margin on a short broad lobe.

Similar species, which contain divaricatic acid, are Niebla sorocarpia that differs by the larger thallus with longer tubular basal branches, by the aggregate apothecia—appearing to have resulted from aborted development over time on narrower short finger-like terminal lobes, and by the cortex appearing to wear off on terminal lobes; Niebla podetiaforma and Niebla turgida, distinguished by the yellowish green color, the reticulate ridges oriented transversely near the tips of the branches, and the bulging cortical surface between the ridges; Niebla dilatata and Niebla caespitosa that differ by the flattened branches, Niebla rugosa, distinguished by the ladder-like arrangement of the transverse cortical ridges; Niebla laminaria that has a thicker cortex; Niebla contorta, distinguished by the smaller thallus, and finally Niebla juncosa that differs by the longitudinal cortical ridges that define the branch margins. Among other chemotypes, Niebla lobulata is most similar, distinguished by the containing sekikiaic acid.

== Taxonomic history ==
Niebla undulata was recognized in regard to pursuing a lichen flora of Baja California beginning May 1986. The species (N. undulata) was found to occur frequently on pebble size lava of mesas and leeward slopes.

Niebla undulata has been included under a very broad species concept of Niebla homalea; one that essentially recognizes only three species in the genus as defined by Spjut. The taxonomic treatment for the broad concept (Niebla homalea), and for the genus, has many inconsistencies, however.

In comparing the two disparate taxonomic treatments, thalli of a particular species according to a narrowly defined species (e.g., N. undulata) show morphological similarities more than dissimilarities even though they may overlap with characteristic traits of other species. These differences are geographical, and also appearing related to the associated species in the Niebla community or population; this might be indicative of occasional hybridization. Further taxonomic studies may clarify some of the variation by placing emphasis on other character features to define the species, or additional species may be recognized. Under the broad species concept (Niebla homalea), the morphological variation is considered too variable to clearly differentiated by morphological characters, except for the presence and absence of isidia (isidium), and that by distinguishing just two species by the medulla reaction to para-phenylenediamine, depsidones (pd+, Niebla josecuervoi), and depsides (pd-, Niebla homalea), the morphological differences become irrelevant to species determination. However, the separation of the Niebla species by the chemical spot tests is an unnatural one in that Niebla homalea appears polyphyletic, in contrast to defining the species by monophyly.
