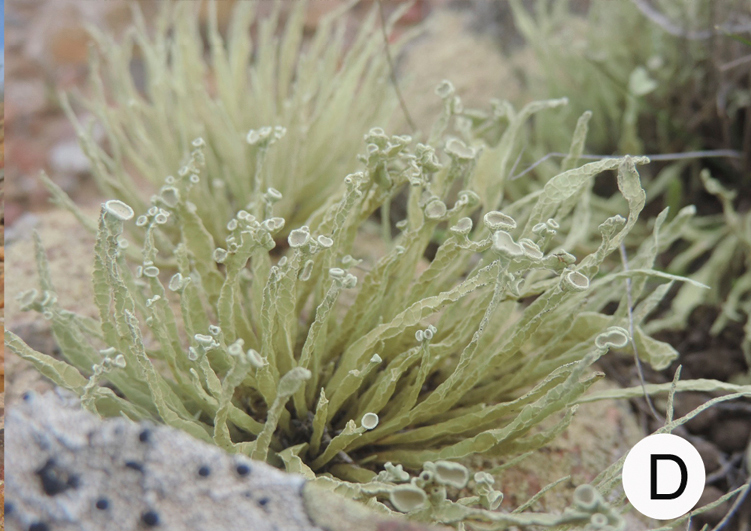
- Niebla siphonoloba at San Antonio BC.

Scientific classification
- Kingdom: Fungi
- Division: Ascomycota
- Class: Lecanoromycetes
- Order: Lecanorales
- Family: Ramalinaceae
- Genus: Niebla
- Species: N. siphonoloba

Binomial name
- Niebla siphonoloba Spjut (1996)

= Niebla siphonoloba =

Species of lichen

Niebla siphonoloba is a fruticose lichen that grows on rocks along the foggy Pacific Coast of North America, in the Channel Islands (Santa Cruz Island), and from Bahía de San Quintín, Baja California to the Vizcaíno Peninsula. The epithet, siphonoloba is in reference to the pipe-like shape of the thallus branches.

== Distinguishing features ==
Niebla siphonoloba is distinguished by a thallus divided into relatively few—less than 20–branches from a pale rusty orange pigmented holdfast, the branches generally cylindrical, stubby, oblong to linear in outline, to 5 cm long and 1.5–3(-5) mm wide, most simple, some branched above the middle, more frequently branched near apex in thalli on Santa Cruz Island, short wavy (sinuous) along marginal and intermarginal cortical ridges, occasionally with short rounded lobes, especially near apex, and by containing sekikaic acid, with triterepenes. The cortex is relatively thin, 35–75 (-100) μm thick, with the cortical ridges much like a honeycomb. Black dot-like pycnidia appear inconspicuous and sparsely distributed except on upper branches. Apothecia appear terminal and subterminal on branches, often clustered, especially thalli on Santa Cruz Island. Similar species are Niebla rugosa, distinguished by the lichen substance of divaricatic acid and by the ladder like transverse ridges between margins and by the acute marginal ridges, Niebla podetiaforma, distinguished by finely reticulate cortical surface between margins, Niebla contorta, distinguished by the broadly rounded terminal lobes, and Niebla undulata that differs in having smooth recessed cortical areas between ridges.

The species (N. siphonoloba) seems to form hybrids with Niebla suffnessii (sekikaic acid), Niebla marinii (salazinic acid) on mesas north of Punta Canoas, and Niebla fimbriata on Santa Cruz Island as evident from cortical ridges. Thalli on Santa Cruz Island also appear intermediate in branching and cortical features to the more densely branched Niebla dactylifera (sekikaic acid) that is found only on San Nicolas Island, and to the typical (simple) branch form that occurs in Baja California.

== Taxonomic history ==
Niebla siphonoloba was recognized as a result of undertaking a taxonomic revision of the genus in regard to developing a lichen flora of Baja California, which began in 1986. It was first recognized from specimens collected on the Vizcaíno Peninsula near Arroyo San Andrés, 15 May 1986, the type (biology), Spjut 9699, deposited at the United States National Herbarium (Smithsonian Institution, Museum of Natural History, Botany Department), and at the Universidad Autónoma de Baja California, Ensenada, Mexico. The species (N. siphonoloba) was subsequently recognized to occur frequently on lava along the northern peninsula of Baja California coast to Bahia de San Quintín, and on Santa Cruz Island in the Channel Islands.

Niebla siphonoloba has also been interpreted to belong to a broad species concept of Niebla homalea, one that recognizes only three species in the genus, two by the medulla reaction to para-phenylenediamine, depsidones (pd+, Niebla josecuervoi), depsides (pd-, Niebla homalea) and one by isidia (Niebla isidiaescens), based on a narrow genus concept; the broad taxonomic concept has been reported to have many inconsistencies.
