= Niebla flabellata =

Scientific classification
- Kingdom: Fungi
- Division: Ascomycota
- Class: Lecanoromycetes
- Order: Lecanorales
- Family: Ramalinaceae
- Genus: Niebla
- Species: N. flabellata

Binomial name
- Niebla flabellata Spjut (1996)

Species of lichen

Niebla flabellata is a fruticose lichen that grows on rocks along the foggy Pacific Coast of Baja California in the Northern Vizcaíno Desert, from San Fernando Canyon to the northern shore of the Vizcaíno Peninsula west to Cedros Island. The epithet, flabellata is in reference to the flattened branches of the thallus.

== Distinguishing features ==
Niebla flabellata is characterized by a fragile thallus divided into irregularly flattened branches spreading from a holdfast, to 7 cm high and 6 cm across, and by containing the lichen substance salazinic acid (without triterpenes; with consalazinic acid, sabrosin derivative), and by its relatively thin cortex, 25–50 μm thick, in contrast to 45–75 μm thick in Niebla josecuervoi, which also differs by the cylindrical-prismatic branches. The branches of N. flabellata rarely show any definite shape, varying from almost entirely ribbon-like, to often partly ribbon-like with irregularly dilated parts, or mostly dilated and variously torn along the margins. Black dot like pycnidia are common and conspicuous along the branch margins, on the cortical ridges, and at the branch tips, undoubtedly due to the relatively thin cortex. The species will mostly likely be confused with Niebla effusa, one that differs by having a rigid thallus that grows on ground instead on rocks, features that are associated with a thicker cortex (35–75 μm thick) and by the absence of a central attachment holdfast (in spreading over the ground).

Niebla flabellata is one of the common pebble lichens in the Niebla communities found along the northern coastal peninsula of Baja California south of Campo Nuevo, but it also occurs on rocks of canyon walls of arroyos, and on calcareous ridges.

On Cedros Island, and in the Sierra Hornitos on the Vizcaíno Peninsula, and near Rosarito towards the southern end of the northern peninsula of Baja California, Niebla spatulata is recognized as a rare species that occurs with N. flabellata. It differs by having the lichen substance hypoprotocetraric acid. The two species appear to represent one of the few examples of sibling species in the genus.

Also along the northern Vizcaíno Peninsula is Niebla limicola, a species that has the flattened branch morphology of N. flabellata, the short bifurcate branchlets of Niebla arenaria, and the terricolous lichen habit of Niebla effusa, all which contain salazinic acid. It is found mainly along the barren tidal flats and on dunes with coastal salt scrub.

== Taxonomic history ==
Niebla flabellata was first collected just north of Punta Santa Rosalillita (vicinity of Rancho San Andrés, 2 May 1985, as part of a 100 gram sample that largely contained Niebla caespitosa to be submitted for anti-HIV screening by the National Cancer Institute, but the sample was not immediately submitted because it contained thalli of N. flabellata and Niebla flagelliforma; the former is distinguished by having salazinic acid as indicated above, the latter with divaricatic acid and terminal flagelliform branchlets;. The entire sample was analyzed by thin-layer chromatography from which 55 grams of Niebla caespitosa were later submitted (14 Nov 1985) to the National Cancer Institute (NCI) Natural Products Branch, among 63 other lichen samples, 59 of which were from Oregon. The sample was accessioned as WBA-202 with reference to the collection number S & M 9073 (for Richard Spjut & Richard Marin), identified as Niebla aff. testudinaria.

It may be noted that Niebla flabellata has been treated as belonging to a broad spectrum of morphological and chemical variation under a single species, Niebla josecuervoi, which includes all the other species of Niebla mentioned above and more.
