= Niebla rugosa =

Scientific classification
- Kingdom: Fungi
- Division: Ascomycota
- Class: Lecanoromycetes
- Order: Lecanorales
- Family: Ramalinaceae
- Genus: Niebla
- Species: N. rugosa

Binomial name
- Niebla rugosa Spjut (1996)

Species of lichen

Niebla rugosa is a fruticose lichen that grows on rocks along the foggy Pacific Coast of Baja California in the Vizcaíno Desert. The epithet, rugosa is in reference to the wrinkled reticulated surface of the thallus.

== Distinguishing features ==
Niebla rugosa is distinguished by a thallus divided into relatively few—less than 20–branches from a yellow pigmented holdfast, the branches generally strap-shaped, oblong to linear in outline, to 4 cm long and 3–7 mm wide, mostly simple, wavy along acute margins and cortical ridges, occasionally with short rounded lobes, especially near apex, with longitudinal spiraling ridges that divide and unite generally at 45° to form angled margins and intermittent ridges, the longitudinal ridges connected by transverse ridges, similar to a spiraled ladder (or DNA helix), and by containing divaricatic acid, with triterepenes. Similar species are Niebla siphonoloba, distinguished by the lichen substance sekikaic acid and by transverse ridges branching between margins, Niebla podetiaforma, distinguished by reticulated vein-like cortical ridges between margins, Niebla contorta distinguished by the obtuse branch margins, and Niebla undulata that differs by having a smooth recessed cortical surface between ridges.

== Taxonomic history ==
Niebla rugosa was recognized as a result of undertaking a taxonomic revision of the genus in regard to developing a lichen flora of Baja California, which began in 1986. It was first collected northwest of Bahía Tortugas near Punta Eugenia on the Vizcaíno Peninsula of Baja California. 17 May 1986, the type (biology), Spjut 9699, deposited in the United States National Herbarium (Smithsonian Institution, Museum of Natural History, Botany Department), and at the Universidad Autónoma de Baja California, Ensenada, Mexico. The species (N. rugosa) was subsequently collected along the east coast of Cedros Island (Spjut & Marin 10539, Apr 1989) on mesas north of Punta Canoas (Spjut 11251, Apr 1990), and on small rocks in a pebble Niebla community along the beach near the northern boundary of the Vizcaíno Desert, just south of Campo Nuevo (Spjut & Marin 12760, Apr 1993).

Niebla rugosa is only known from collections made by Richard Spjut and Richard Marin, while their herbarium specimens have been interpreted to belong to a broad species concept of Niebla homalea, one that recognizes only three species in the genus, two by the medulla reaction to para-phenylenediamine, depsidones (pd+, Niebla josecuervoi), depsides (pd-, N. homalea) and one by isidia (Niebla isidiaescens), based on the genus concept defined by Spjut; however, the broad taxonomic concept has many inconsistencies.
