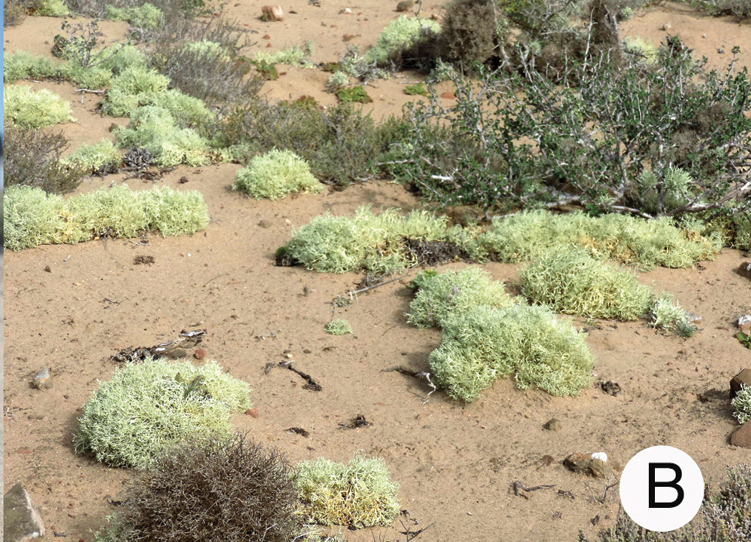

Scientific classification
- Kingdom: Fungi
- Division: Ascomycota
- Class: Lecanoromycetes
- Order: Lecanorales
- Family: Ramalinaceae
- Genus: Niebla
- Species: N. marinii

Binomial name
- Niebla marinii Spjut (1996)

= Niebla marinii =

Species of lichen

Niebla marinii is a fruticose lichen that grows on lava along the Pacific Coast of Baja California from near San Fernando Canyon south to Morro Santo Domingo. The epithet, marinii, is in honor of a field assistant, Richard Marin, who accompanied the author on lichen-collecting expeditions to Baja California during 1985–1996, while he also assisted in the gathering of samples of flowering plants for cancer research.

== Distinguishing features ==
Niebla marinii is distinguished by the thallus divided into linear-subterete or linear-prismatic branches from a common attachment base (or holdfast); the primary branches often tubular inflated near base with a glossy smooth cortex, dividing frequently into equal secondary branches above, the branches wide spreading, arcuate or horseshoe shaped, densely tangled together, terminally flexuous or whip-like; the whole thallus to 15 cm in diameter and 6 cm high. The species (N. marinii) also recognized by containing salazinic acid, without triterpenes, but often with an unknown, possibly scabrosin derivative. Pycnidia are prominent at tips of branches and on the upper parts of branches. Niebla josecuervoi is similar, differing in the numerous short spine-like branchlets along the upper side of primary branches, the branches appearing comb-like.

Niebla marinii—consistent in its morphological features at specific locations but variable in cortical features when viewed collectively from all locations—may possibly comprise two species, one of which has distinctly raised cortical ridges. This may be a hybrid with Niebla siphonoloba. Evidence for hybridization is seen by the same morphological variation in another species; one that has the bushy habit and smooth cortex of N. marinii, Niebla suffnessii as found at its type locality—Cerro Elefante on the Vizcaíno Peninsula. Approximately 200 miles north of Cerro Elefante—which is about halfway up the northern Baja peninsula and just north of Punta Canoas—are both N. marinii and N. suffnessii that occur together on Mesa Camacho—a red lava mesa, 300–400 m in elevation. At this location, the thalli of both species have conspicuously raised sinuous (short wavy) cortical ridges; proposed species names have been suggested, one for the salazinic acid species, the other for the sekikaic acid species. Although the same species of Niebla can vary in a particular feature such as in its cortical ridge patterns, it may also retain other morphological and chemical taxonomic features at different locations; in this case, Niebla marinii has the wide angle branching (horseshoe-shaped branchlets) and prominent pycnidia at both locations, whereas N. suffnessii has inconspicuous pycnidia and long drawn-out branches at both locations.

Sinuous cortical ridges are generally characteristic of the sekikaic-acid species Niebla siphonoloba throughout its geographical range, and it occurs frequently on Mesa Camacho. This species (N. siphonoloba) is recognized by its simple stubby branches in addition to having sekikaic acid and a prominent reticulated (honeycomb-like) cortex. A logical explanation for the occurrence of the distinct cortical sinuous ridges in N. marinii and N. suffnessii on Mesa Camacho is hybridization, which in lichens is rarely mentioned, and when it is, it usually is in context with chemical variation. or vegetative diasporas such as soredia ([soredium]) and isidia ([isidium]). In Niebla, the chemical features are believed to be genetically conserved and closely linked to morphological features for each species, while less genetically linked features are suggested to be easily exchanged. As a further example, in the Channel Islands (Santa Cruz Island), N. siphonoloba is suspected to hybridize with another sekikaic-acid species Niebla fimbriata as seen by their intermediates. The morphological variation in Niebla marinii, N. suffnessii and N. siphonoloba are just a few examples of the broad spectrum of morphological variation that can be found in each species, referred as morpho-syndrome variation, in contrast to chemo-syndromes recognized in the related genus Ramalina. Morpho-syndrome variation generally has not been recognized in lichens, because it would seem that environmentally induced variation is considered a more likely explanation.

== Taxonomic history ==
Niebla marinii was first recognized from thalli collected at Morro Santo Domingo, a peninsula 22 miles north of Guerrero Negro, (type specimen, Spjut 9783), collected 18 May 1986 towards a lichen flora of Baja California. It was the dominant fruticose lichen on red lava. A common associated species was Niebla lobulata, also its type locality.

Niebla marinii has been included under a very broad species concept, (Niebla josecuervoi); one that essentially recognizes only three species in the genus Niebla, defined by a two-layered cortex, isolated chondroid strands in the medulla and by the lichen substances lacking the terpenes found in Vermilacinia. Under the broad species concept, the morphological differences are seen as environmentally induced variation, and the chemical differences (e.g., Niebla pulchribarbara, protocetraric acid) are viewed as belonging to a chemo-syndrome; however, no data was presented to support this view, other than reference to studies in other genera in which the species differences mentioned were not applicable.
