= Niebla versiforma =

Scientific classification
- Kingdom: Fungi
- Division: Ascomycota
- Class: Lecanoromycetes
- Order: Lecanorales
- Family: Ramalinaceae
- Genus: Niebla
- Species: N. versiforma

Binomial name
- Niebla versiforma Spjut (1996)

Species of lichen

Niebla versiforma is a rare fruticose lichen that grows on gravelly soil along the foggy Pacific Coast of Baja California on a mesa above San Antonio del Mar just north of Punta Colonet. The epithet, versiforma is in reference to the various shapes of a thallus branch.

== Distinguishing features ==
Niebla versiforma is distinguished by the thallus divided into numerous branches and branchlets entangled together into a hemispherical or ball like mat, similar to the reindeer lichen, Cladonia rangiferina; the primary branches somewhat ribbon-like with variously widened and narrow twisted parts, bearing crooked spinuliferous branchlets, to 4 cm high and 6 cm across, and further distinguished by containing divaricatic acid, with triterepenes. The species appears to be a hybrid between Niebla effusa, which differs in having salazinic acid, and Niebla juncosa var. spinulifera, which differs in having uniformly narrow branches.

== Taxonomic history ==
Niebla versiforma was described by Richard Spjut as a result of undertaking at taxonomic revision of the genus Niebla in regard to developing a lichen flora of Baja California. It was collected 13 April 1990 on decomposed lava among larger volcanic rocks on a mesa about 100 meters in elevation above the sea. It was found with two other rare species of Niebla, Niebla pulchribarbara and Niebla palmeri, in association with common lichen species Niebla juncosa, Niebla josecuervoi, Niebla arenaria, and Niebla effusa in a low mixed succulent and thorn scrub of Agave shawii, Dudleya ingens, Ferocactus spp. Mammillaria dioica, Frankenia palmeri, Eriogonum fastigiatum, and Rosa minutifolia, recognized as transitional vegetation between the California chaparral and desert scrub south of El Rosario. The species (N. versiforma) has also been treated as Niebla homalea based on its lichen metabolite, divaricatic acid, without distinction to morphological differences, all of which are viewed as related to environmental variation. However, because of the different taxonomic views of the genus Niebla, it has been suggested in a review that molecular phylogeny studies are needed.
