= Niebla sorediata =

Scientific classification
- Kingdom: Fungi
- Division: Ascomycota
- Class: Lecanoromycetes
- Order: Lecanorales
- Family: Ramalinaceae
- Genus: Niebla
- Species: N. sorediata

Binomial name
- Niebla sorediata Spjut (1996)

Species of lichen

Niebla sorediata is a fruticose lichen that grows on rocks along the foggy Pacific Coast of North America, in the Channel Islands (San Clemente Island) of California and on Guadalupe Island of Baja California. The epithet, sorediata, is in reference to the development of soredia (soredium).

== Distinguishing features ==
Niebla sorediata is distinguished by a thallus divided into subtubular-prismatic branches from a pale yellow pigmented holdfast, the primary branches—from the holdfast—generally oblong in outline, to 5 cm long and 1.0–3 mm wide, branching above base but from below the middle, with obscure cortical ridges between branch margins, the cortical ridges along branch margins with short rod-like isidia (isidium) that develop one to three terminal capitate granular soralia (soredium), and by containing divaricatic acid, with triterepenes. Similar species are those that produce only isidia, Niebla isidiaescens, Niebla isidiosa, and Niebla usneoides.

== Taxonomic history ==
Niebla sorediata was recognized as a result of undertaking a taxonomic revision of the genus in regard to developing a lichen flora of Baja California, which began in 1986. A specimen at the United States National Herbarium (Smithsonian Institution, Museum of Natural History, Botany Department), collected 18 June 1966 by William Weber and Rolf Santesson (type (biology)) specimen, was recognized by Richard Spjut as a distinct species in the genus by the development of soredia, the only sorediate species in the genus. The type, collected 18 June 1966 (no. 185), from Los Angeles Co., San Clemente Island, "Eel Point, west shore of island, 100-200 ft altitude on blocks of talus a few hundred yards from the shore, was noted by the collectors on their herbarium label to represent “a peculiar pale-sorediate phase forming discrete colonies distinct at a glance from the typical form.”

Niebla sorediata has been interpreted to belong to a broad species concept of Niebla homalea, one that recognizes only three species in the genus, two by the medulla reaction to para-phenylenediamine, depsidones (pd+, Niebla josecuervoi), depsides (pd-, Niebla homalea) and one by isidia (Niebla isidiaescens), based on the genus concept defined by Spjut; however, the broad taxonomic concept has many inconsistencies. For example two other isidiate species were indicated as synonyms of N. isdiaescens, whereas the isidiate-sorediate N. sorediata was listed as a synonym of N. homalea.
