= Niebla tesselata =

Scientific classification
- Kingdom: Fungi
- Division: Ascomycota
- Class: Lecanoromycetes
- Order: Lecanorales
- Family: Ramalinaceae
- Genus: Niebla
- Species: N. tesselata

Binomial name
- Niebla tesselata Spjut (1996)

Species of lichen

Niebla tesselata is a fruticose lichen that grows on rocks along the foggy Pacific Coast of in the Northern Vizcaíno Desert of Baja California. The epithet, tesselata, is in reference to the cobblestone pattern on the surface of the thallus branches.

== Distinguishing features ==
Niebla tesselata is distinguished by the thallus divided into tubular branches from a pale rusty orange pigmented holdfast, the branches generally narrowly conical, simple, densely covered by black dot-like pycnidia positioned centrally on areolae, and by containing sekikaic acid, with triterpenes. The species (N. tesselata) is unique in the genus for its simple branches and for the central development of pycnidia on the raised areolate surface, as opposed to developing along the cortical ridges as generally recognized for the genus Niebla. Also, pycnidia are not confined to the upper parts of the branches as in most species of the genus; instead, they extend to the base of the thallus. Apothecia (ascocarp) are unknown.

== Taxonomic history ==
Niebla tesselata was recognized as a result of undertaking a taxonomic revision of the genus in regard to developing a lichen flora of Baja California, which began in 1986. At the time the species (N. tesselata) was being published, it was only known from the holotype (biology), collected 4 April 1994, Richard Spjut & Richard Marin 13108, deposited in the United States National Herbarium (Smithsonian Institution, Museum of Natural History, Botany Department). Subsequently another single specimen was found on Mesa San Carlos in April 1996; it is also without apothecia. The species occurs at the interior edges of fog zone on red volcanic rocks, where fog lichens generally become sparse.

Niebla tesselata has been interpreted to belong to a broad species concept of Niebla homalea, one that recognizes only three species in the genus; two by the medulla reaction to para-phenylenediamine, depsidones (pd+, Niebla josecuervoi) and depsides (pd-, Niebla homalea), and one by isidia (isidium),(Niebla isidiaescens), based on the genus concept defined by Spjut; The treatment of the species under the broad taxonomic concept has many inconsistencies.
