= Niebla podetiaforma =

Scientific classification
- Kingdom: Fungi
- Division: Ascomycota
- Class: Lecanoromycetes
- Order: Lecanorales
- Family: Ramalinaceae
- Genus: Niebla
- Species: N. podetiaforma

Binomial name
- Niebla podetiaforma Spjut (1996)

Species of lichen

Niebla podetiaforma is a fruticose lichen that grows frequently on small stones in fog regions along the Pacific Coast of Baja California from San Vicente Canyon to Morro Santo Domingo. The epithet, podetiaforma is in reference to a primary inflated branch of the thallus that resembles a podetium, a common feature in the lichen genus Cladonia.

== Distinguishing features ==
Niebla podetiaforma is distinguished by the thallus divided into small tufts of yellowish-green, tubular-inflated, branches not more than 5 cm high, the branches usually less than 20 in number, erect to spreading and curved, occasionally divided into similar branches, or more often fringed along the upper side with shorter branches or lobes that bear apothecia, and by containing the lichen substance divaricatic acid, with triterpenes, and with yellow pigments concentrated at the base. The cortex is relatively thin, 25–50 μm thick, covering a fistulose (hollow) medulla. Similar species are Niebla turgida, which differs by the bushy growth (larger thallus with more than 20 branches) with long tapered branches, Niebla undulata, distinguished by the recessed cortical surface between the cortical ridges, Niebla rugosa that differs by the ladder-like transverse cortical ridges between branch margins, and Niebla contorta that is recognized by the terminal rounded lobes thickened along margins, usually with submarginal apothecia; all contain divaricatic acid and less inflated branches. A sekikaic acid-containing species, Niebla siphonoloba, often recognized by the simple branches with a closely reticulate cortex similar to a honeycomb, occasionally has less conspicuous reticulate ridging that may be confused with N. podetiaforma; this form is more easily distinguished by its secondary lichen metabolite (sekikaic acid).

Niebla podetiaforma is a common lichen of coastal pebble lichen communities in the Northern Vizcaíno Desert of Baja California. It often occurs on leeward slopes, and on mesas more inland from the coast than other species of Niebla. This adaptation undoubtedly is related to the thin cortex and hollow medulla, which probably account for bloated appearance of the branches. Rare thalli have a flattened appearance as if someone had stepped on them, but can be identified N. podetiaforma by the fine reticulate pattern of cortical ridges. Divaricatic-acid species of Niebla are generally distinguished by cortical features, in contrast to branching patterns in salazinic acid-containing species, and apothecial developmental patterns in sekikaic acid-containing species, with exceptions that require application of other morphological characters.

== Taxonomic history ==
Niebla podetiaforma was recognized by Richard Spjut as a distinct species from Niebla homalea based on samples that he and Richard Marin had collected for anti-HIV screening in Baja California, 29 April 1985,(Spjut & Marin 9077), about 35 miles north Guerrero Negro on ridges and leeward slopes above San Andrés Ranch. On the day before they collected samples of Niebla homalea on Punta Banda and Niebla flagelliforma (initially identified as Niebla sp. undescribed) near Rosarito just north of Guerrero Negro. A sample of approximately 100 grams of N. podetiaforma was to be sent to the National Cancer Institute, Natural Products Branch for their drug screening program in the search for new compounds to treat HIV and cancer; but instead the collected thalli were used as exsiccati that were distributed 11 years later to other institutions through the ABLS Lichen Exchange The species was described in 1996. Niebla podetiaforma has also been included under an extremely broad interpretation of N. homalea based on the assumptions that morphological variation in Niebla is environmentally induced and that chemical variation represents chemo-syndrome variation; however, this broad interpretation of Niebla homalea and other related species has inconsistencies in the taxonomic treatment of the genus.
