= Niebla limicola =

Scientific classification
- Kingdom: Fungi
- Division: Ascomycota
- Class: Lecanoromycetes
- Order: Lecanorales
- Family: Ramalinaceae
- Genus: Niebla
- Species: N. limicola

Binomial name
- Niebla limicola Spjut & Follmann (1996)

Species of lichen

Niebla limicola is a fruticose lichen that grows on barren mud flats and on sand among salt scrub along the Pacific Coast of the Vizcaíno Desert, of Baja California from San Vicente Canyon to Scammon’s Lagoon (Guerrero Negro). The epithet, limicola is in reference to the thallus growing on barren (alkali) soil.

== Distinguishing features ==
Niebla limicola is distinguished by a hemispherical thallus lying loose on soil without a central holdfast (terricolous), divided into variously shaped branches, partly narrow in length and prismatic in cross section, and partly flattened and dilated from which short acicular bifurcating branchlets arise, the thallus up to 10 cm high and 15 cm across. The species (N. limicola) also recognized by containing salazinic acid (without triterpenes), and by a relatively thin cortex, (0-)45–75 μm thick, appearing to erode on dilated parts of branches; the thinner cortex evidently related to the contorted appearance of the branches in addition to the medulla being partly hollow (fistulose). The species (N. limicola) is most similar to Niebla flabellata, which differs by its thallus growing on rocks attached to a holdfast at base, and by the irregular lacerations of the thallus branches, instead of the regular bifurcations of acicular branches that develop in N. limicola. Niebla arenaria, which is also similar in the terricolous habit and by the bifurcate branchlets, differs by the mostly linear shape of the branches.

== Taxonomic history ==
Niebla limicola was recognized as a distinct species by three individuals on separate occasions before the species was described by Richard Spjut in 1996. Gerhard Follman, a specialist in the taxonomy of the genus Ramalina, which included Niebla, the family Roccellaceae, and other lichen groups, who was at Guerrero Negro on 3 January 1989 during a winter 1989-90 lichen expedition headed by Thomas Nash III for the project—Greater Sonoran Desert Lichen Flora collected and photographed specimens he sent in 1993 to Richard Spjut who had been conducting a taxonomic revision of the genus. Spjut had also collected it (N. limicola) earlier at Guerrero Negro on 20 April 1990 (type). Additionally, his field partner, Richard Marin, while acting as a tour guide in Baja California to Scammon’s Lagoon on 15 Feb 1991, recognized it as possibly distinct from what he had recalled seeing during lichen expeditions he had accompanied Richard Spjut to Baja California (1985–1987, 1989–1990), collected a specimen (Marin & Spjut 11916) and gave it to Spjut in March 1991 as they traveled again to Baja California. This specimen was cited, along with Follmann’s specimen, in the taxonomic revision of the genus Niebla with Follmann included as coauthority for the species name.

Although the species (N. limicola) was independently recognized as possibly new by three individuals, and subsequently described as new in 1996, it was later included in synonymy with the earlier name Niebla josecuervoi in the Lichen Flora of the Greater Sonoran Desert, without a revised description for Niebla josecuervoi, except for reference made to description of Niebla homalea. Essentially, only two or three species in the genus Niebla were described. Niebla, as defined by Spjut, has a two-layered cortex, isolated chondroid strands in the medulla, and lichen substances predominantly depsides with triterpenes differing from those in Vermilacinia or depsidones lacking the terpenes. The two disparate treatments of Niebla, including Vermilacinia, were noted in a book review.
