= Niebla brachyura =

Scientific classification
- Kingdom: Fungi
- Division: Ascomycota
- Class: Lecanoromycetes
- Order: Lecanorales
- Family: Ramalinaceae
- Genus: Niebla
- Species: N. brachyura

Binomial name
- Niebla brachyura Spjut (1996)

Species of lichen

Niebla brachyura is a rare fruticose lichen that grows along the Pacific Coast of North America in the fog regions of the northern peninsula of Baja California in the Northern Vizcaíno Desert. The epithet, brachyura, is in regard to the species resembling a crab lying on its back with its leg appendages pointing up.

== Distinguishing features ==
Niebla brachyura is recognized by a hemispherical thallus similar to the reindeer lichen Cladonia rangiferina, loosely attached to soil without a holdfast, intricately divided into thick rigid tubular prismatic branches irregularly forked near apex, the tips usually with black dot-like pycnidia, and by containing the lichen substance hypoprotocetraric acid. It grows with other species, notably Niebla arenaria, on mud flats near the ocean. Similar species are Niebla effusa, distinguished by containing the lichen substance salazinic acid, and Niebla pulchribarbara, distinguished by containing protocetraric acid.

== Taxonomic history ==
Niebla brachyura was first collected just north of Punta Santa Rosalillita in May 1986 as part of a 100 gram sample that largely contained Niebla caespitosa intended for anti-HIV screening by the National Cancer Institute, but the sample was not submitted because of the novel chemotype that was discovered for the genus. Only one thallus was found in the sample. It was later discovered at two other locations, Punta Canoas and Punta Cono.
