= Niebla halei =

Scientific classification
- Kingdom: Fungi
- Division: Ascomycota
- Class: Lecanoromycetes
- Order: Lecanorales
- Family: Ramalinaceae
- Genus: Niebla
- Species: N. halei

Binomial name
- Niebla halei Spjut (1996)

Species of lichen

Niebla halei is a fruticose lichen that grows on rocks along the foggy Pacific Coast of northern California on San Bruno Mountain The epithet, halei is in honor of Mason Hale who encouraged taxonomic revision of the genus Niebla.

== Distinguishing features ==
Niebla halei is characterized by a tiny hemispherical thallus, 1.5 cm high and 2.5 cm across, with numerous very narrow branches, 0.3–1.0 mm wide, arising from a common attachment area on rock, and by dividing several or more times, more so near apex where shortly bifurcate (bifurcation) or antler-like. Black dot-like pycnidia that generally characterize the genus are inconspicuous at apex of branches. The key lichen substance is divaricatic acid (with triterpenes).

The increased branching of the thallus towards apex is similar to that of Niebla dactylifera, known only from San Nicolas Island; it differs in having the lichen substance, sekikaic acid. The cortical ridging and branching of N. halei are also similar to specimens collected by Charis Bratt on Santa Cruz Island (Bratt 6431) and in the Santa Ynez Mountains on mainland California (Bratt 7202), referred to Niebla testudinaria by the larger size and less frequent occurrence of short bifurcate branches near apex.

== Taxonomic history ==
Niebla halei was recognized as a result of undertaking a taxonomic revision of the genus towards development of a lichen flora of Baja California, beginning in 1986. A peer review of the manuscript in 1990 suggested that additional herbarium collections be studied, especially of Niebla collected in California and the Channel Islands. Additional specimens were studied through loans obtained by the U.S. National Herbarium (Smithsonian Institution) from the University of Colorado at Boulder and from the Santa Barbara Museum of Natural History. Niebla halei was discovered among the borrowed specimens of Niebla. The type (biology) of Niebla halei was collected by Albert William Herre, 13 July 1906.
