= Niebla lobulata =

Scientific classification
- Kingdom: Fungi
- Division: Ascomycota
- Class: Lecanoromycetes
- Order: Lecanorales
- Family: Ramalinaceae
- Genus: Niebla
- Species: N. lobulata

Binomial name
- Niebla lobulata Spjut (1996)

Species of lichen

Niebla lobulata is a fruticose lichen that grows on rocks in the fog regions along the Pacific Coast of Baja California, from Bahía de San Quintín to Vizcaíno Peninsula and offshore islands, Isla San Martín, and Guadalupe Island. The epithet, lobulata is in reference to the lobed margins of the thallus branches.

== Distinguishing features ==
Niebla lobulata is distinguished by a thallus divided into mostly strap-shaped branches from a basal holdfast, the branches not more than 20 in number, wide spreading above a short tapered and narrow base, occasionally dividing into similar branches, the branch margins often wavy (undulate), and/or lobed, or lacerated, the whole thallus not more than 7 cm high. The species (N. lobulata) also recognized by containing sekikaic acid (with triterpenes), and by a relatively thin cortex, (0-)35–75(-100) μm thick, eroding near base, covering a fistulose medulla (solid on Guadalupe Island), which seems related to the contorted appearance of the branches. The species (N. lobulata) is most similar to Niebla undulata, which differs by having the lichen substance of divaricatic acid, instead of sekikaic acid.

== Taxonomic history ==
Niebla lobulata was first recognized as distinct from other species in the genus while collecting samples for chemopreventive agents and for anticancer screening on the Vizcaíno Peninsula near Arroyo San Andrés. A 400 gram sample of (N. lobulata) was collected among flowering plants Pachycormus discolor, Encelia stenophylla, Eriogonum encelioides, Eriogonum pondii, Salvia cedrosensis, Petalonyx linearis, Rhus lentii and various other lichens and one desert mushroom identified as having affinity to Battarraea phalloides. The species (N. lobulata) was also found growing with Niebla usneoides, which also contains sekikaic acid but differs in having isidia (isidium).

Niebla lobulata has been included under a very broad species concept, (Niebla homalea); one that recognizes only three species in the genus Niebla as defined by the having a two-layered cortex, isolated chondroid strands in the medulla, and by the lichen substances lacking the terpenes found in Vermilacinia. Further comparisons between the two species concepts are given in a review.
