= Pachycormus =

Pachycormus is the scientific name for two genera of organisms and may refer to:

- Pachycormus (fish), an extinct genus of ray-finned fishes from the Jurassic
- Pachycormus (plant), a genus of plants in the family Anacardiaceae
