= Niebla usneoides =

Scientific classification
- Kingdom: Fungi
- Division: Ascomycota
- Class: Lecanoromycetes
- Order: Lecanorales
- Family: Ramalinaceae
- Genus: Niebla
- Species: N. usneoides

Binomial name
- Niebla usneoides Spjut (1996)

Species of lichen

Niebla usneoides is a fruticose lichen that grows on rocks in the fog zone along the Pacific Coast of Baja California in the Vizcaíno Desert and Magadalena Desert regions, and reported also from the Channel Islands and mainland of southern California. The epithet, usneoides is in reference to the similarity to the lichen genus Usnea.

== Distinguishing features ==
Niebla usneoides is distinguished by a thallus divided into numerous subtubular more or less linear shaped branches, to 4 cm high and 8 cm across, that are fringed above with spiculiform branchlets and by short coralloid isidia (isidium) along margins. The branches become terminally whip-like, or abruptly curved. Pycnidia (Note: Pycnidium (pycnidia plural) is a small flash-shaped structure, generally 200–350 µm long in Niebla, that produces conidia which escape through an opening (ostiole) at the top and function in reproduction, asexually or sexually) and apothecia are absent.

Similar species are Niebla suffnessii and Niebla isidiaescens. Niebla suffnessii is viewed as the fertile counterpart of a species pair (N. suffnessii and N. usneoides). They appear to intergrade by isidia in rare thalli occurring sparsely at the base of the thallus of N. suffnessii. Niebla isidiaescens differs in having divaricatic acid instead of sekikiaic acid and by the presence of pycnidia.

== Taxonomic history ==
Niebla usneoides was first recognized by Richard Spjut as distinct from other species in the genus while collecting samples for chemopreventive agents and for anticancer screening on the Vizcaíno Peninsula near Arroyo San Andrés in May 1986. A 700 gram sample of N. usneoides was collected in a mixed desert and coastal sage scrub region characterized by Pachycormus discolor, Encelia stenophylla, Eriogonum encelioides, Eriogonum pondii, Salvia cedrosensis, Petalonyx linearis, Rhus lentii and various lichens and one desert mushroom Battarraea phalloides. (Note: Reference materials are herbarium (voucher) specimens with data on labels and the extracts with computer databases on the collectors and locations where collected. Samples of lichens, one mushroom and flowering plants collected for John Cassady, Chairman of the Department of Medicinal Chemistry and Pharmacognosy at Purdue University, and later Dean of the School of Pharmacy at Ohio State University. He and his graduate student, Thomas McCloud, had accompanied Richard Spjut on an expedition to Baja California during May 1986. A 700 gram sample N. usenoides was accessioned as WBA-384 (Spjut 9785, Niebla sp. (undescribed, “frizzy”). Spjut identified the lichens and flowering plants. Mushroom identified (Battarraea cf. phalloides by mycology specialists at the USDA Agricultural Research Service Systematic Botany, Mycology and Entomology Laboratory in Beltsville, Maryland.) The species (N. usneoides) was also found growing with Niebla lobulata, and Niebla suffnessii, both also contain sekikaic acid but differ in the absences of isidia (isidium).

Niebla usneoides has been included under Niebla isidiaescens on the assumption that differences in the secondary metabolites, sekikaic acid and divaricatic acid, represent different “races” of one species, derived from a highly variable Niebla homalea. However, the term race implies a genetic difference derived from sexually reproducing species. Both N. isidiaescens and N. usneoides reproduce primarily by asexual propagules; thus, they can hardly be considered races of an asexually reproducing species (N. isidiaescens) as treated by Peter Bowler and collaborators. The two chemotypes (sekikiaic aicd, divaricatic acid) generally do not occur together, or if found in the same region, usually one chemotype is dominant such as reported by Spjut for N. usneoides. This may be viewed as evidence of a genetic difference as opposed to environmentally induced chemical variation. Alternatively, the two isidiate species are races of the fertile (sexual) species, which under a very broad species concept is N. homalea, and if this view is adopted, then both isidiate species would be included under N. homalea.
