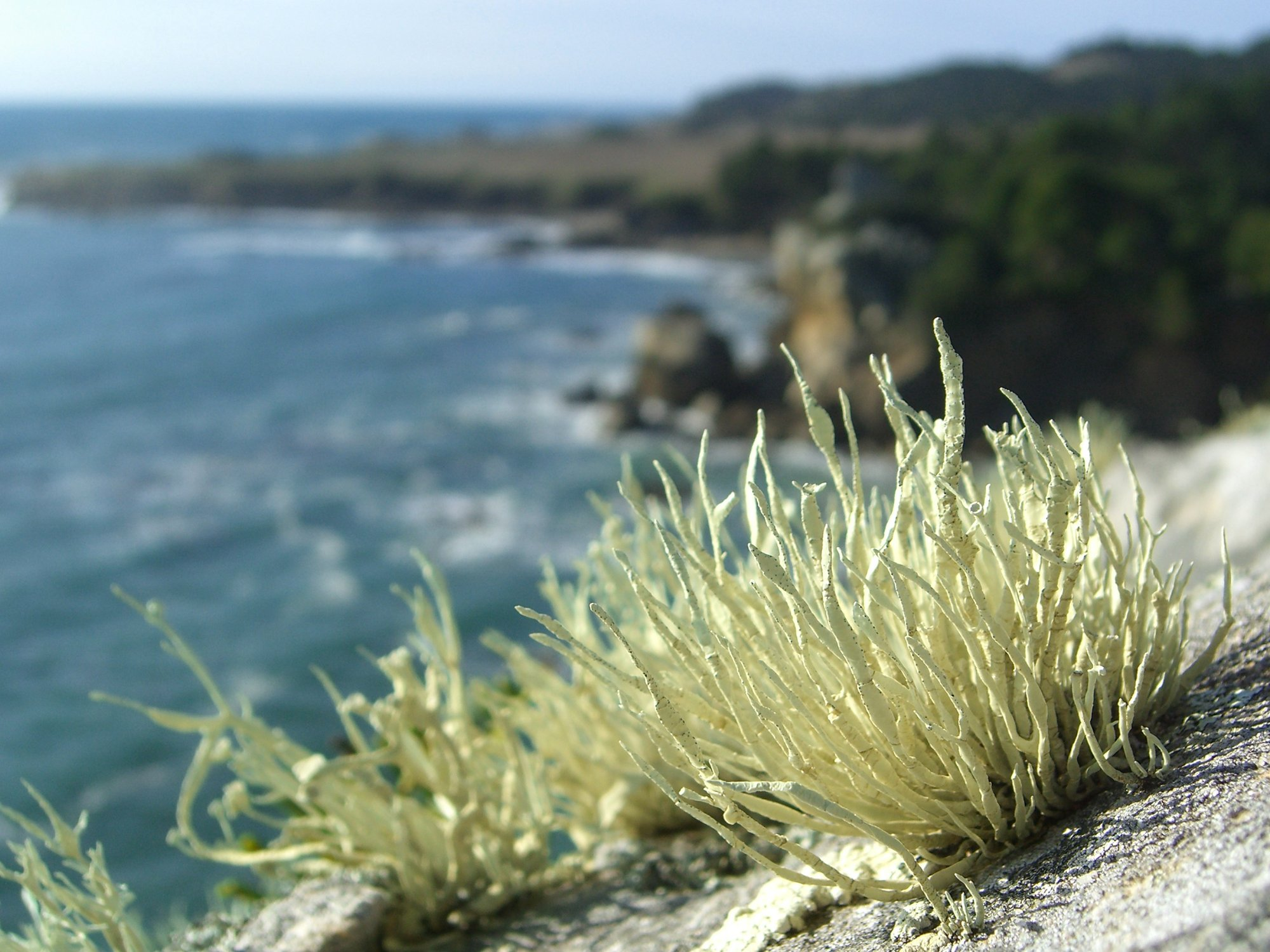
- Niebla homalea

Scientific classification
- Kingdom: Fungi
- Division: Ascomycota
- Class: Lecanoromycetes
- Order: Lecanorales
- Family: Ramalinaceae
- Genus: Niebla; Rundel & Bowler (1978)

Type species
- Niebla homalea (Ach.) Rundel & Bowler (1978)

= Niebla (lichen) =

Genus of lichen

Niebla, also known as the sea-fog lichens, is a genus of yellow-green fruticose lichens that grow on rocks, trees, and shrubs within the fog zone of coastal North America, or more narrowly defined to occur on rocks and soil along the Pacific Coast from Mendocino County in California south to Baja California Sur.

== Taxonomy ==
The genus name is a substitute name for Desmazieria, a homonym created by Camille Montagne in 1852 who recognized only one species in the genus (D. homalea); however, the name Desmazeria, although not spelled exactly the same but nevertheless considered to be the same (homonym), had been given to a genus of grass (Poaceae) by Barthélemy Dumortier in 1822. The earliest name is the one that must be retained unless the later name is conserved, according to the International Code of Botanical Nomenclature. Additionally, the type species name for Niebla is Niebla homalea, based on the name given to the one species that had been recognized by Montagne for the genus, not Niebla ceruchis.

The genus Niebla has also been interpreted broadly to include the genus Vermilacinia, although both classifications distinguish species by the presence or absence of chondroid strands. In the broad classification, only three species of Niebla with chondroid strands are recognized under two arbitrary groups of lichen substances based on their reaction to chemical spot tests of which the most useful in Niebla appears to be para-phenylenediamine (pd); the nine species in the narrow classification that contain depsidones (pd+) are all placed under N. josecuervoi in the broad classification. A second group that contains depsides but also includes the acid-deficient chemotype (N. homaleoides), collectively treats 32 species under the name N. homalea. The inclusion of the acid-deficient species in N. homalea disregards the chemotaxonomic attribute of a pigment associated with species that contain salazinic acid. Both classifications recognize N. isidiaescens. Eleven other species that are treated in Vermilacinia are distinguished by thallus morphology.

Molecular studies on the North American species of Niebla and Vermilacinia have been limited and contradictory. An unpublished study mentioned in a 1995 communication indicated that Niebla was paraphyletic and that by recognizing Vermilacinia rendered Niebla monophyletic. A later study—that reported largely on Old World species of Ramalina and which included collections of Niebla and Vermilacinia species—concluded that Niebla was monophyletic. However, source material (voucher specimens) cited in the later study for the basis of the DNA analysis of Niebla was reported to be from California and identified N. homalea with protocetraric acid and triterpenes. But this chemotype had not been known in Niebla, nor are depsidones known to be present in N. homalea, nor are they present in any species of Niebla in California; protocetraric acid is found only in N. pulchribarbara, which lacks triterpenes, a rare species that occurs in northern Baja California. In the Lichen Flora of the Greater Sonoran Desert Region, the description given for N. homalea erroneously described the species to have depsidones, including protocetraric acid, which may be confused with salazinic acid when conducting thin-layer chromatography. Salazinic acid is a common lichen substance accessory to triterpenes in species of Vermilacinia, while it may also be noted that the morphology of V. laevigata is easily confused with that of N. homalea.

In view of the controversial classification of this Ramalina complex of genera, and that many of the species are common along the Pacific coast of North America, it may be helpful to conservationists to have molecular studies be conducted to correlate the different views of the species concepts with their DNA, which should include representative specimens from the entire geographic range of the species before drawing definitive conclusions about their synonymy.

== Description ==
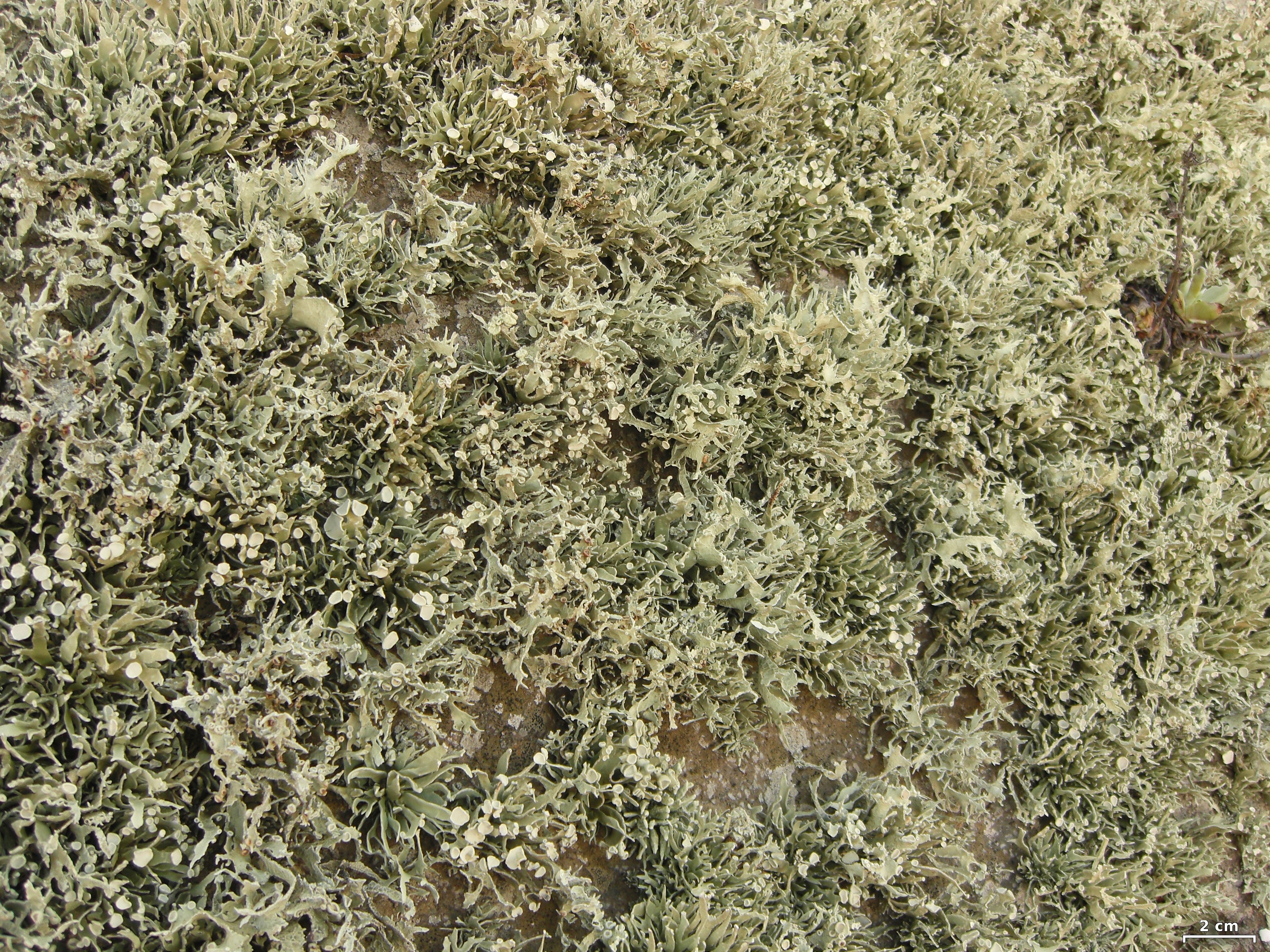
Niebla community on Morro Rock, California

Niebla has 42 species distinguished by secondary metabolites (lichen substances) and by morphology. Niebla lichen substances fall into two groups. One group has triterpenes, the other lacks triterpenes. Species of Niebla that contain triterpenes also contain depsides as major lichen substances, which in a species may be either divaricatic acid or sekikaic acid. The group lacking triterpenes contains depsidones as major lichen substances—protocetraric acid, hyprotocetraric acid, salazinic acid, or none of the acids are present in N. homaleoides. Usnic acid, pigments, and other unknown secondary substances are also produced but have little taxonomic value except for one pigment associated with species that produce salazinic acid. The same pigment occurs in the acid-deficient N. homaleoides.

The morphological characters employed to distinguish species of Niebla include the orientation of ridges in the lichen cortex, differences in fragmentation branchlets, which often have black carbonized pycnidia, and the development of specialized asexual propagules referred to as soredia and isidia. Most species occur in Baja California, Mexico.

Niebla is related to Ramalina and Vermilacinia, distinguished from them by the presence of thread-like hyphae intertwined into gelatinized cords called chondroid strands. These strands run lengthwise within the central axis (medulla) of the Niebla thallus, and are visible to the naked eye when a branch of the thallus is sliced or torn. Chondroid strands also protrude into the cortical surface in various network arrangements in which species are recognized by their particular network structure.

Some Ramalina species in the Mediterranean Region have medullary chondroid stands unattached to the medulla; however, they differ from Niebla in having pale pycnidia instead of black pycnidia, and often contain pseudocyphellae and more than one depside or depsidone accompanied by triterpenes and/or bourgeanic acid. Their classification in Ramalina is supported by molecular phylogeny data.

Vermilacinia differs from both Ramalina and Niebla by the absence of chrondroid strands, and by presence of other lichens substances, predominantly terpenes that differ from those in Niebla. Of taxonomic significance is the diterpene (-)-16 α-hydroxykaurane, a rare secondary metabolite in lichens. This diterpene is found only in Vermilacinia within the Ramalinaceae, and also in Roccella (Roccellaceae).

== Species ==
The following lists all the species in the genus Niebla that have been recognized. In bold are those generally accepted. Listed separately are those also treated in the genus Vermilacinia. Species rare or isolated in occurrence are also noted.

- Niebla arenaria
- Niebla brachyura Rare
- Niebla caespitosa
- Niebla contorta
- Niebla cornea
- Niebla dactylifera Rare
- Niebla dilatata
- Niebla disrupta
- Niebla dissecta
- Niebla eburnea
- Niebla effusa
- Niebla fimbriata
- Niebla flabellata
- Niebla flagelliforma
- Niebla halei Rare
- **Niebla homalea**
- Niebla homaleoides Rare
- Niebla infundibula Rare
- Niebla isidiaescens
- Niebla isidiosa Rare
- **Niebla josecuervoi**
- Niebla juncosa var. juncosa
- Niebla juncosa var. spinulifera
- Niebla laminaria
- Niebla limicola
- Niebla lobulata
- Niebla marinii
- Niebla nashii
- Niebla palmeri Rare
- Niebla podetiaforma
- Niebla pulchribarbara Rare
- Niebla ramosissima Rare
- Niebla rugosa
- Niebla siphonoloba
- Niebla sorediata Rare
- Niebla sorocarpia
- Niebla spatulata Rare
- Niebla suffnessii
- Niebla tesselata Rare
- Niebla testudinaria
- Niebla turgida
- Niebla undulata
- **Niebla usneoides**
- Niebla versiforma Rare

Species classified in Niebla also recognized in Vermilacinia

- Niebla cephalota
- Niebla ceruchis
- Niebla cedrosensis
- Niebla ceruchoides
- Niebla combeoides
- Niebla flaccescens
- Niebla granulans
- Niebla laevigata
- Niebla polymorpha
- Niebla procera
- Niebla robusta
- Niebla tigrina
- Niebla tuberculata Rare
