= Niebla ramosissima =

Conservation status
- Vulnerable (IUCN 3.1)

Scientific classification
- Kingdom: Fungi
- Division: Ascomycota
- Class: Lecanoromycetes
- Order: Lecanorales
- Family: Ramalinaceae
- Genus: Niebla
- Species: N. ramosissima

Binomial name
- Niebla ramosissima Spjut (1996)

Species of lichen

Niebla ramosissima is a rare fruticose lichen that grows on soil on San Nicolas Island in the Channel Islands of California. The epithet, ramosissima, is in reference to the very much branched thallus.

== Distinguishing features ==
Niebla ramosissima is distinguished by a mat-like, flaccid thallus, very much divided into numerous tangled narrow sublinear-prismatic branches to 16 cm across, the individual branches only 0.5–1.0 mm in diameter, and by containing divaricatic acid, with triterepenes. Niebla juncosa, a species with the same chemistry and similarly shaped branches, which occurs on the Baja California peninsula, differs by its turgid thallus with larger branches, 2–5 mm in diameter, and further differs in their spreading to erect habit and in their elliptical shape in cross section.

== Taxonomic history ==
Niebla ramosissima was recognized as a result of undertaking a taxonomic revision of the genus in regard to developing a lichen flora of Baja California, which began in 1986. A peer review of the manuscript in 1990 suggested that additional herbarium collections be studied, especially of Niebla on the California mainland and in the Channel Islands. Additional specimens were studied through loans obtained by the United States National Herbarium (Smithsonian Institution, Museum of Natural History, Botany Department) from the University of Colorado at Boulder and from the Santa Barbara Museum of Natural History. Niebla ramossisima was discovered among the borrowed specimens (of Niebla). The species is known only from the holotype (biology). It was collected by Charis Bratt, 12 February 1993. Niebla ramosissima has also been included under an extremely broad interpretation of Niebla homalea based on the assumptions that morphological variation in Niebla is environmentally induced and that chemical variation represents chemo-syndrome variation; however, this broad interpretation of N. homalea and other related species has inconsistencies in the taxonomic treatment of the genus.
