= Niebla isidiosa =

Scientific classification
- Kingdom: Fungi
- Division: Ascomycota
- Class: Lecanoromycetes
- Order: Lecanorales
- Family: Ramalinaceae
- Genus: Niebla
- Species: N. isidiosa

Binomial name
- Niebla isidiosa Spjut (1996)

Species of lichen

Niebla isidiosa is a fruticose lichen known only from Guadalupe Island. The epithet, isidiosa is in reference to isidia (isidium) on the thallus.

== Distinguishing features ==
Niebla isidiosa is characterized by a rigid thallus divided into irregularly widened branches, to 5 cm long and 5 cm across, by its development of dense isidia along the reticulate ridges of the cortex, by containing divaricatic acid, and by the absence of pycnidia. The irregular widened branches are similar to Niebla caespitosa, which not only lacks isidia, but also has a thinner cortex, 45–75 μm thick, in contrast to 100–150 μm thick in N. isidiosa. The thicker cortex of N. isidiosa—along with its reticulate ridging—is much like that of Niebla testudinaria, 100–150 μm thick; it also lacks isidia. Another similar species, Niebla sorediata, which has a relatively thin cortex, 30–40 μm thick, differs by the granular appearance of the isidia that become sorediate (soredium). Niebla isidiosa was probably derived from N. testudinaria, which also occurs on Guadalupe Island.

== Taxonomic history ==
Niebla isidiosa was collected by Edward Palmer on Guadalupe Island during Feb to May 1875.

R. Heber Howe, Jr., in a taxonomic revision of the genus Ramalina, in 1913. noted that a manuscript name—R. homalea f. isidiosa by Henry Willey on the specimen collected by Palmer—that it represented a "contingent phase of R. homalea." The epithet was adopted by Richard Spjut who also designated the Palmer specimen as holotype (biology) for a new species in his revision of the genus Niebla.

Another isidiate species, Niebla isidiaescens, described by Peter Bowler and collaborators in 1994, based on a type specimen from the southern state of Baja California, differs by the flagelliform (flagellum)branches with a cortex 45–75 μm thick, generally becoming thinner towards apex as in N. flagelliforma. This had been recognized for some time by Spjut under an unpublished name for specimens he collected in southern Baja California that he deposited with annotations at the United States National Herbarium (Smithsonian Institution) in 1986. Bowler and Janet Marsh in 2004 treated N. isidiosa as a synonym of their N. isdiaescens. Another isidiate species was considered a synonym of the non-isidiate N. homalea. No explanation was provided for the discordant taxonomy, while other inconsistencies have been reported.
