= Niebla turgida =

Scientific classification
- Kingdom: Fungi
- Division: Ascomycota
- Class: Lecanoromycetes
- Order: Lecanorales
- Family: Ramalinaceae
- Genus: Niebla
- Species: N. turgida

Binomial name
- Niebla turgida Spjut (1996)

Species of lichen

Niebla turgida is a fruticose lichen that grows on rocks in the fog zone along the Pacific Coast of Baja California in the Northern Vizcaíno Desert The epithet, turgida is in reference to the swollen branches of the thallus.

== Distinguishing features ==
Niebla turgida is distinguished by a yellow green bushy thallus to 6 cm high and 15 cm across, divided into tubular swollen branches; the primary branches, which are often round in cross section near base, are loosely connected to a yellowish pigmented holdfast, blackened slightly above base, curve upwards or spread widely and become entangled, mostly narrow in length and prismatic to partially flattened above in cross section, variously fringed along the branch margins, often long tapered to the tip. The cortex is relatively thin, 35–50 μm thick, with prominent network of raised vein-like ridges on the surface, the longitudinal ridges generally not defining the branch margins, interconnected by diagonal ridges that fork and connect to other ridges; black dot-like pycnidia (Note: Pycnidium (pycnidia plural) is a small flash-shaped structure, generally 200–350 μm long in Niebla, that produces conidia which escape through an opening (ostiole) at the top and function in reproduction, asexually or sexually) conspicuous along the cortical ridges; apothecia often in small clusters on lobes of terminal short spur-like branches; the key lichen substance is divaricatic acid, with triterpenes. Similar species are Niebla podetiaforma, distinguished by the smaller thallus with less prominent cortical ridges, and Niebla juncosa that differs by longitudinal cortical ridges that define the branch margins.

== Taxonomic history ==
Niebla turgida was recognized in regard to pursuing a lichen flora of Baja California from thalli collected inland from the coast between Punta Negra and Punta Rocosa during March 1988. The species (N. turgida) is a common lichen on boulders of slopes and mesas north of Puerto Catarina.

Niebla turgida has been included under a very broad species concept of Niebla homalea; one that essentially recognizes only three species in the genus Niebla as defined by Spjut. A taxonomic treatment for the broad concept of Niebla homalea and the genus has many inconsistencies, however.
