= Niebla homaleoides =

Scientific classification
- Kingdom: Fungi
- Division: Ascomycota
- Class: Lecanoromycetes
- Order: Lecanorales
- Family: Ramalinaceae
- Genus: Niebla
- Species: N. homaleoides

Binomial name
- Niebla homaleoides Spjut (1996)

Species of lichen

Niebla homaleoides is a fruticose lichen that grows on rocks within a narrow region of the foggy Pacific Coast of Baja California in the Northern Vizcaíno Desert, Arroyo Sauces, Punta Cono and ridges south of Punta Negra. The epithet, homaleoides is in reference to the similarity to Niebla homalea.

== Distinguishing features ==
Niebla homaleoides is characterized by a rigid thallus divided into sub[terete] mostly strap-shaped branches spreading from a holdfast, to 8 cm high, and by the absence of lichen substances except usnic acid and an unknown suspected to be a scabrosin derivative. The species is best identified by chromatography such as high-performance liquid chromatography or thin-layer chromatography. The cortex generally resembles that of Niebla cornea, whereas comb-like branchlets on some thalli are similar to those of Niebla josecuervoi. Other thalli that have flattened branches are similar to Niebla flabellata. Pycnidia are prominent on the upper parts of branches, and appear to be among the largest in the genus, but comparative measurements are not available for all species of Niebla.

Niebla homaleoides is related to the depsidone species within the genus by the absence of triterpenes, most closely to salazinic acid-containing species by the presence of an unknown, possibly scabrosin derivative. This lichen chemotype is found in the related Niebla flabellata, Niebla josecuervoi, and Niebla marinii. Scabrosin esters isolated from the lichen Xanthoparmelia scabrosa have shown activity against human tumor cell lines at nanomolar concentrations.

== Taxonomic history ==
Niebla homaleoides was discovered by Richard Spjut, accompanied by Richard Marin and Thomas McCloud, on 19 May 1986 just south of Punta Negra on rock outcrops on a ridge that appeared to receive more precipitation from ocean fog than other nearby areas (Plate 1D in Spjut’s 1996 revision of Niebla and Vermilacinia). This particular ridge was observed during May 1985 by Spjut—while he and Marin were collecting samples of lichens in search of new drugs to treat HIV—to have fog lingering around the peaks most of the day. The following year, in May 1986, a special effort was made to find a path to the ridges and peaks. In addition to Niebla homaleoides, other rare new species of lichens were discovered, Niebla infundibula (divaricatic acid) and Vermilacinia rigida. Except for N. infundibula, the species were also found on Punta Cono, 15 April 1990. A strong similarity of the Nieblas—and one other species on the same rock outcrop, Niebla josecuervoi (salazinic acid)—is suggested to be the result of hybridization, and also at another location, Arroyo Sauces, with Niebla flabellata, a species that is characterized by a flattened branch morphology. The prominence of the pycnidia and their potential role in sexual reproduction has to be considered.
