= Niebla disrupta =

Scientific classification
- Kingdom: Fungi
- Division: Ascomycota
- Class: Lecanoromycetes
- Order: Lecanorales
- Family: Ramalinaceae
- Genus: Niebla
- Species: N. disrupta

Binomial name
- Niebla disrupta (Nyl.) Spjut (1996)

Synonyms
- Ramalina homalea var. disrupta Nyl. (1870)

Species of lichen

Niebla disrupta is a fruticose lichen that grows on rocks along the foggy Pacific Coast of California, from Marin County to San Luis Obispo County, in the Channel Islands, and on Guadalupe Island in Baja California. The epithet, disrupta was given by William Nylander possibly in reference to the terminal vine-like branchlets exhibiting a disruption or slight change in the direction of growth where apothecia develop, or possibly to the branchlets that appear to break off.

== Distinguishing features ==
Niebla disrupta is generally recognized by the thallus divided into many narrow subterete branches, to 7 cm high, arising from a well-defined holdfast, blackened around the base to a short distance above, often with long terminal vine-like branchlets; the branchlets often with undeveloped apothecia, the more mature apothecia commonly seen below—in the mid to lower part of the thallus.

The thallus branches are similar to those of the related Niebla homalea in their linear shape and in the margins twisting 90° at frequent intervals, and by transverse cracks occurring at frequent but irregular intervals, and in the texture of the cortex, which is slightly thinner in N. disrupta, 75–110 μm thick, compared to 75–150 μm thick in N. homalea. Black dot-like pycnidia are common along branch margins—at least to the mid region, and often to near base, and mostly absent between margins.

Niebla disrupta is further distinguished by the lichen substance sekikaic acid, with accessory triterpenes, in contrast to divaricatic acid in N. homalea. These depsides are related compounds but nevertheless warrant species distinction as seen in other lichen genera. For example, Dirinaria sekikaica differs from D. picta by containing sekikaic acid instead of divaricatic acid; both species contain triterpenoids as accessory substances; Fuscidea maccarthyl contains sekikaic acid (UV−) in contrast to divaricatic acid (UV+) in several related species.

Niebla disrupta appears to intergrade with N. dissecta in the Channel Islands by development of tubular prismatic branches, and with N. cornea in southern California (San Luis Obispo County) by the flattened strap-like branches. They appear to be hybrids but referred to N. disrupta by the thallus being taller than wide with numerous branches arising from the base.

== Taxonomic history ==
Niebla disrupta was first recognized by Nylander in 1870 as a variety of N. homalea. Upon study of the type (biology) specimen, it was given species status due to the finding of sekikaic acid employing thin-layer chromatography.

Niebla disrupta and N. homalea, among many other species in the genus, have all been included under N. homalea; however, in regard to the comparison of the two species they cannot be considered sibling species since their morphological features vary independently, while their reproductive isolation is unknown Apothecia in Niebla homalea appear less frequent and develop more towards the apex of branches, often on short side branchlets, and are compressed to where they attach to the branch, the branch itself also flattened at the junction. Additionally, these short side branchlets often appear without apothecia. In N. disrupta, apothecia often develop on young branches from which one or more additional branchlets form, and it would seem that the continued growth of the vine-like branchlets positions the apothecia lower on the thallus.

It is not so much a question of whether N. disrupta is a species but whether or not it should be recognized because it hybridizes with other species. Although hybridization has yet to be substantiated in Niebla, the species concept in the genus may likely be debated for some time due to the extreme morphological and chemical variation in the genus.
