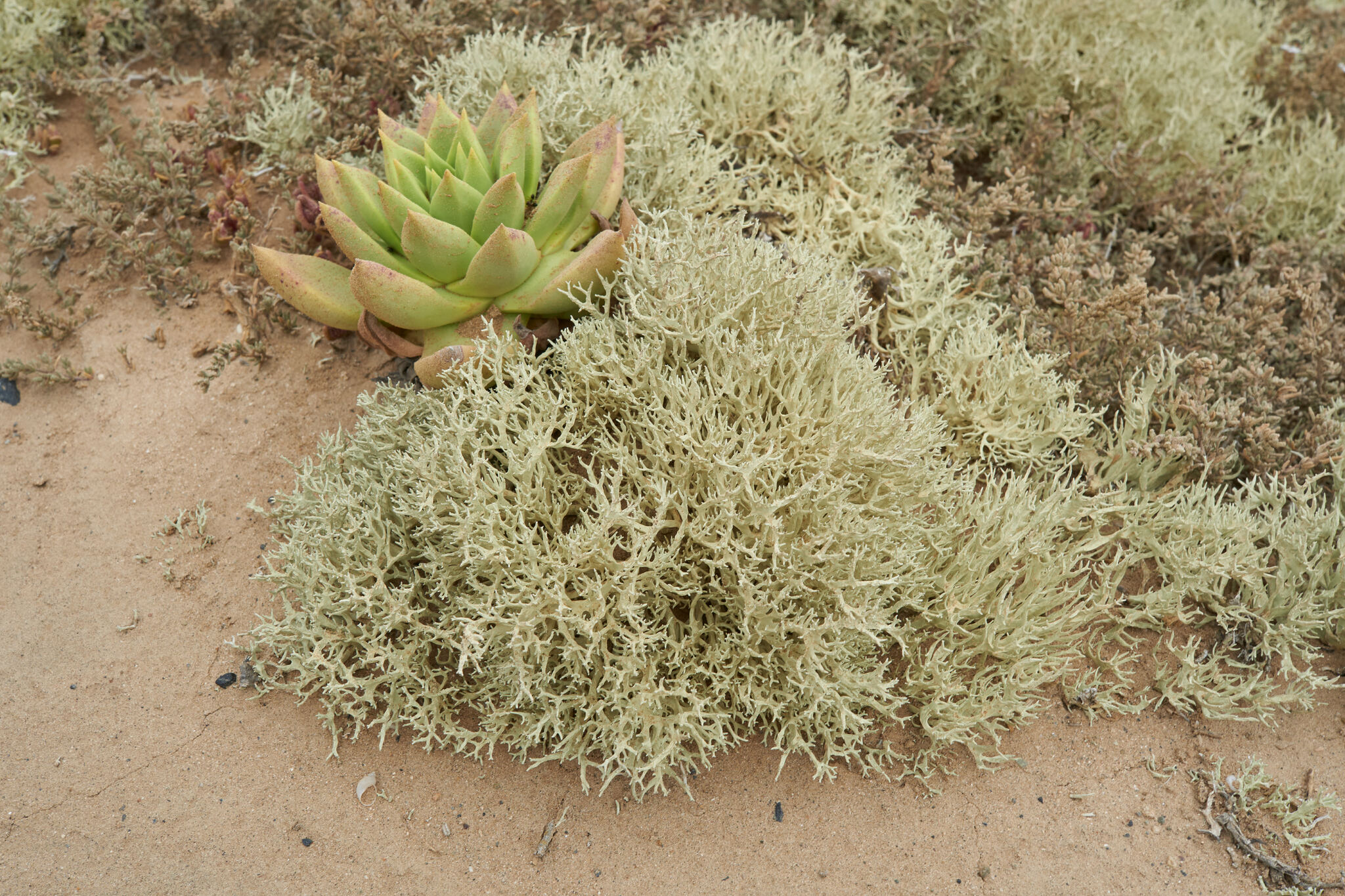
- Growing in fog desert habitat near Punta Baja, Baja California

Scientific classification
- Kingdom: Fungi
- Division: Ascomycota
- Class: Lecanoromycetes
- Order: Lecanorales
- Family: Ramalinaceae
- Genus: Niebla
- Species: N. arenaria

Binomial name
- Niebla arenaria Spjut (1996)

= Niebla arenaria =

Species of lichen

Niebla arenaria is a fruticose lichen that grows along the Pacific Coast of North America in the fog regions of the northern peninsula of Baja California from near Colonet south to Morro Santo Domingo. The epithet, arenaria, is in regard to the species growing on sand.

== Distinguishing features ==
Niebla arenaria is recognized by a hemispherical thallus similar to the reindeer lichen Cladonia rangiferina, loosely attached to soil without a holdfast, intricately divided into narrow tubular prismatic branches shortly bifurcate near branch tips, the tips usually with black dot-like pycnidia, and by containing the lichen substance salazinic acid. It sometime forms pure colonies along sandy shores of bays and peninsulas, possibly as a result of the black-tipped branchlets breaking off and reproducing. Similar species are Niebla brachyura, distinguished by containing the lichen substance hypoprotocetraric acid, Niebla pulchribarbara, distinguished by containing protocetraric acid, and Niebla limicola, that differs by the broad flattened curled (crispate) branches near base from which short bifurcate acicular branchlets develop.

== Taxonomic history ==
Although Niebla arenaria was described in 1996, it had been known earlier as a chemical variant of Niebla pulchribarbara that was distinguished from Niebla homalea by containing depsidones instead of depsides, and from Niebla josecuervoi by the lack of central basal attachment point and without apothecia. These two groups of lichen substances could be separated by the medulla reaction to para-phenylenediamine, depsidones (pd+), depsides (pd-). It was stated that: "This beautiful terricolous species forms extensive discontinuous mats...on beach terrace deposits atop coastal bluffs south of El Rosario and beyond, often in densities great enough to color the landscape yellow-green." The extensive terricolous lichen growth has since been recognized to comprise N. arenaria and Niebla effusa, with occasional Niebla juncosa. Niebla pulchribarbara is recognized strictly by the lichen substance protocetraric acid, and is considered a rare species found only in northern Baja California; however, one of the coauthors who first described N. pulchribarbara, has since considered the species to be a morphological and chemical variant of another species he described, N. josecuervoi, along with N. arenaria, and all other species that contain salazinic acid and hypoprotocetraric acid.
