= Vermilacinia flaccescens =

Scientific classification
- Domain: Eukaryota
- Kingdom: Fungi
- Division: Ascomycota
- Class: Lecanoromycetes
- Order: Lecanorales
- Family: Ramalinaceae
- Genus: Vermilacinia
- Species: V. flaccescens

Binomial name
- Vermilacinia flaccescens (Nyl.) Spjut & Hale (1995)

Synonyms
- Ramalina flaccescens Nyl. (1870); Niebla flaccescens (Nyl.) Rundel & Bowler (1978)

Species of lichen

Vermilacinia flaccescens is a fruticose lichen that grows on cacti and shrubs in the fog regions along the Pacific Coast of South America, Peru, Chile and in the Juan Fernandez Islands The epithet is in reference to the flaccid thallus but some specimens have been interpreted to have rigid branches.

== Distinguishing Features ==
Vermilacinia flaccescens is classified in the subgenus Cylindricaria in which it is distinguished from related species by the thallus divided into long subcylindrical branches and by containing the lichen substance methyl 3,5 dichlorolecanorate, with or without zeorin and/or (-)-16 α-hydroxykaurane.

== Taxonomic History ==
Vermilacinia flaccescens was first described by William Nylander in 1870 as a species of Ramalina. It was transferred to the genus Desmazieria in 1969, to Niebla in 1978, and to Vermilacinia in 1995. R. Heber Howe, Jr. in 1913 indicated that a specimen collected by Edward Palmer at San Diego might belong to V. flaccescens; however, his reference to Nylander’s description of the “lacunose” branches indicates it was probably V. corrugata as further supported by study of a specimen labeled Palmer 269b at the United States National Herbarium, Smithsonian Institution.
