= Niebla dilatata =

Scientific classification
- Kingdom: Fungi
- Division: Ascomycota
- Class: Lecanoromycetes
- Order: Lecanorales
- Family: Ramalinaceae
- Genus: Niebla
- Species: N. dilatata

Binomial name
- Niebla dilatata Spjut (1996)

Species of lichen

Niebla dilatata is a fruticose lichen that grows on rocks on Guadalupe Island and the foggy coast of the Baja California peninsula. The epithet, dilatata, is in reference to the broadly expanded (dilated) lobes of the thallus.

== Distinguishing features ==
Niebla dilatata is recognized by the thallus divided into flattened twisted branches that broadly expand above the base, the branches thickened and wavy (undulate) along margins, often with abundant pycnidia and/or apothecia, and by the thallus containing the lichen substance divaricatic acid. The cortex is 75–125 μm thick, in contrast to that of Niebla caespitosa, (25-)45–75 μm thick, a similar species that further differs by the jagged thallus margins. Pigmentation is weak near base of thallus.

== Taxonomic history ==
Niebla dilatata was recognized as a result of undertaking a taxonomic revision of the genus in regard to developing a lichen flora of Baja California. It was indicated to be endemic to Guadalupe Island on the basis of the yellow color and flattened branch morphology of the type, a pressed specimen that makes it difficult to assess its original three dimensional twisted form. Later it was discovered that collections identified as N. caespitosa from near Puerta Catarina and from Puna Cono also belonged to this species. Their thalli were dark green, instead of yellow green, and upon further review, it was realized that the twisted broadly flattened branches were similar to the pressed specimens at the Smithsonian Institution.
