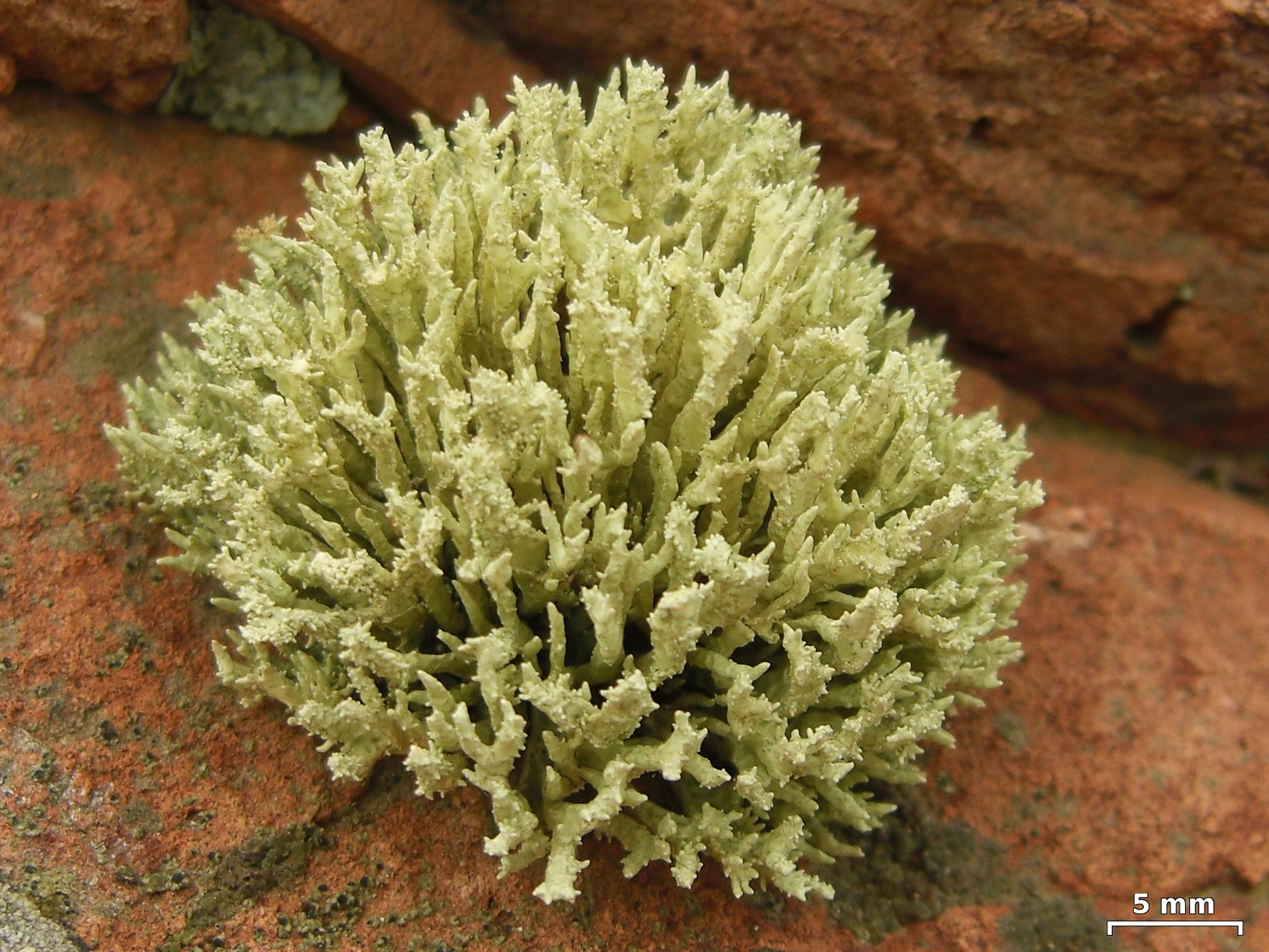

Scientific classification
- Kingdom: Fungi
- Division: Ascomycota
- Class: Lecanoromycetes
- Order: Lecanorales
- Family: Ramalinaceae
- Genus: Niebla
- Species: N. isidiaescens

Binomial name
- Niebla isidiaescens Bowler, J.E.Marsh, T.H.Nash & Riefner (1994)

= Niebla isidiaescens =

Species of lichen

Niebla isidiaescens is a species of fruticose lichen in the family Ramalinaceae. It was originally described in 1994 from specimens collected in Baja California. The lichen grows on rocky outcrops in open maritime scrub habitats.

== Taxonomy ==
The type collection of Niebla isidiaescens was inferred to have divaricatic acid based on the circumscription given by Bowler and collaborators. However, it is a mixed collection of approximately 20 specimens of mostly two species, N. isidiaescens and Vermilacinia paleoderma, and loose branches of a third species, Niebla contorta, the identification for the latter assumes that the thalli parts contain divaricatic acid. This association and the broad lobes of the thallus may indicate that N. isidiaescens was derived from N. contorta, in contrast to Niebla flagelliforma. Niebla usneoides is a similar species distinguished by the absence of pycnidia and presence of sekikaic acid.
