= Niebla juncosa =

Scientific classification
- Kingdom: Fungi
- Division: Ascomycota
- Class: Lecanoromycetes
- Order: Lecanorales
- Family: Ramalinaceae
- Genus: Niebla
- Species: N. juncosa

Binomial name
- Niebla juncosa Spjut (1996)

Species of lichen

Niebla juncosa is a fruticose lichen that grows on rock, stony soil and sand along the Pacific Coast of Baja California from Punta Banda to Morro Santo Dominogo. The epithet, juncosa is in reference to the thallus divided into rush-like branches, the stems of the flowering plant genus Juncus.

== Distinguishing features ==
Niebla juncosa is distinguished by the thallus divided into sublinear subterete branches with a common attachment base (or holdfast); the primary branches generally creeping or ascending to erect, occasionally dividing into equal secondary branches and developing numerous similar branchlets along the upper side of a main branch (var. juncosa) or branchlets spreading in all directions (var. spinulifera), the branch margins not alternating with the cortical ridges; the whole thallus to 10 cm high and 15 cm in diameter. The species (N. juncosa) also recognized by containing divaricatic acid, with triterpenes. The cortex surrounds a fistulose to subfistulose medulla, varying from 55–175 μm thick, generally thinner on the branches where a change in thickness appears related fragmentation branchlets that break off from primary branches.

Two varieties recognized.

Variety juncosa has primary branches with mostly entire margins and usually with secondary (fragmentation) branchlets that develop mostly along the upper side of a primary branch; the secondary branches break off well above the attachment to the primary branch, or nearer the apex as seen in herbarium specimens. Variety juncosa common on rocks but occasionally on sand under Yucca valida in the southern part the Baja peninsula, and on stony ground in the terricolous Niebla communities in the transition zone from chaparral to desert scrub on mesas above Punta Baja.

Variety spinulifera differs by primary branches with mostly wavy (lobed) margins and with spinule-like branchlets that spread in various directions from the primary branch, the spinule branchlets appear to break where attached to the primary branch, appearing to leave a rudimentary lobe; the thallus often appearing less rush-like and more mat-like related to the intricately divided branches. This variety (var. spinulifera) is widely distributed throughout the range of the species.

== Taxonomic history ==
Niebla juncosa was first recognized from thalli growing on a ridge 300–400 meters in elevation south of Punta Negra, between Punta Rocosa and Punta Prieta; the location for the type specimen collected 20 May 1986. Various outcroppings of rock piles along the ridge were discovered to have a rich assemblage of Niebla species, represented by various morphological and chemotypes. The associated species include large bushy thalli of Niebla homaleoides, Niebla infundibula, Niebla josecuervoi, Niebla sorocarpia, Niebla turgida, and other related species with short tufts of branches.

Niebla juncosa has been included under a very broad species concept of Niebla homalea; one that essentially recognizes only three species in the genus Niebla, defined by a two-layered cortex, isolated chondroid strands in the medulla and by lacking key lichen substances such as the triterpene zeorin and the diterpene (-)-16 α-hydroxykaurane that are found in most species of Vermilacinia. Under the broad species concept, the morphological differences are seen as environmentally induced variation, and the chemical differences as chemo-syndromes; however, no data were presented to support this view, other than reference to studies in other genera that appear inapplicable.
