= Niebla dactylifera =

Scientific classification
- Kingdom: Fungi
- Division: Ascomycota
- Class: Lecanoromycetes
- Order: Lecanorales
- Family: Ramalinaceae
- Genus: Niebla
- Species: N. dactylifera

Binomial name
- Niebla dactylifera Spjut (1996)

Species of lichen

Niebla dactylifera is a fruticose lichen that grows only on San Nicolas Island in the Channel Islands of California. The epithet, dactylifera, is in reference to the terminal finger-like branches.

== Distinguishing features ==
Niebla dactylifera is recognized by the thallus divided into tubular-prismatic branches that arise from a thick basal attachment area; the branches, which are not more than 3.0 cm high, become widened above similar to the palm of a hand from which develop many shorter finger like branches. The cortex is not more than 75 μm thick, in contrast to that of Niebla dissecta, 75–110 μm thick, a similar species that further differs by a more regularly branched thallus, one that is also broader at the base than above the base. Black dot-like pycnidia are infrequent and inconspicuous at tips of the ultimate branches. The key lichen substances is sekikaic acid, with accessory triterpenes. Pigmentation is weak near base of thallus, the cortex appearing brownish with blackish areas.

== Taxonomic history ==
Niebla dactylifera was recognized as a result of undertaking a taxonomic revision of the genus in regard towards development of a lichen flora of Baja California, beginning in 1986. A peer review of the manuscript in 1990 suggested that additional herbarium collections be studied, especially of Niebla collected in California and the Channel Islands. Additional specimens were studied through loans obtained by the U.S. National Herbarium (Smithsonian Institution) from the University of Colorado at Boulder and from the Santa Barbara Museum of Natural History. Niebla dactylifera was discovered among the borrowed specimens of Niebla.
