= Niebla flagelliforma =

Scientific classification
- Kingdom: Fungi
- Division: Ascomycota
- Class: Lecanoromycetes
- Order: Lecanorales
- Family: Ramalinaceae
- Genus: Niebla
- Species: N. flagelliforma

Binomial name
- Niebla flagelliforma Spjut (1996)

Species of lichen

Niebla flagelliforma is a fruticose lichen that grows on rocks along the foggy Pacific Coast of Baja California mostly in the Northern Vizcaíno Desert. The epithet, flagelliforma is in reference to the individual branches of the thallus shaped like a flagellum.

== Distinguishing features ==
Niebla flagelliforma is easily recognized by a thallus—up to 6 cm high and 3 cm across—divided from a holdfast into narrow erect branches that terminate—after branching one or more times—in flagelliform branchlets. The cortex of the thallus, which covers a partially hollow medulla, has conspicuous and closely reticulate ridges, often cracking along the transverse ridges, and becomes thinner towards apex, 75–25 μm thick. This thinning of the cortex and the development of a subfistulose medulla probably relates to the coiling of the branches. Black dot-like pycnidia are abundant on the flagelliform branchlets, each pycnidium is surrounded by a cortical margin similar to the thalline margin of an apothecium. The key lichen substance is divaricatic acid (with triterpenes and usnic acid).

Niebla flagelliforma is frequent in wind-sheltered areas inland from the coast on the northern peninsula of Baja California, generally south of Campo Nuevo, but also occurs around Bahía de San Quintín and nearby Isla San Martín.

== Taxonomic history ==
Niebla flagelliforma was recognized as distinct from Niebla homalea, 1 May 1985, following a sample of N. homalea collected 29 April 1985 on Punta Banda in Baja California; N. flagelliforma was collected by Richard Spjut and Richard Marin (S & M 9058A) near Rosarito along Baja Mexico Highway 1, 33 km south of junction with road to Bahía de los Angeles, on rocks of north-facing slopes in the understory of dense brush. A sample of 110 grams was submitted to the National Cancer Institute, Natural Products Branch for their natural product screening program in search of new compounds to treat HIV and cancer; the sample was accessioned as WBA-122, and identified as “Niebla sp. (undscribed) rock ‘ceruchis’ type.” and cited in Spjut's 1996 revision of the genus under N. flagelliforma. The species was described in 1996. It has been since included under an extremely broad interpretation of Niebla homalea; however, this interpretation has been questioned due to inconsistencies in the taxonomic treatment.
