= Niebla pulchribarbara =

Scientific classification
- Kingdom: Fungi
- Division: Ascomycota
- Class: Lecanoromycetes
- Order: Lecanorales
- Family: Ramalinaceae
- Genus: Niebla
- Species: N. pulchribarbara

Binomial name
- Niebla pulchribarbara (Rundel & Bowler) Rundel & Bowler (1978)

Species of lichen

Niebla pulchribarbara is a rare fruticose lichen that occurs on sandy beaches or gravelly soil along the Pacific Coast, at San Antonio del Mar and at Bahía de San Quintín, Baja California. The species epithet, pulchribarbara, is in reference to the strikingly beautiful lichen mat formed by the thallus.

== Distinguishing features ==
Niebla pulchribarbara is distinguished by a hemispherical mat-like thallus, divided into numerous tangled sublinear-prismatic branches to 8 cm high and 16 cm across, and by containing the lichen substance protocetraric acid, without triterpenes. The species (N. pulchribarbara) is known only from two locations in Baja California: (1) growing on stony ground on a mesa above San Antonio del Mar, and (2) growing on sand at Bahía de San Quintín.

== Taxonomic history ==
Niebla pulchribarbara was described by Phillip Rundel and Peter Bowler as a result of conducting an ecological study of a lichen fog community at Bahía de San Quintín in March 1971. They distinguished the species in the genus Desmazieria that was later determined to be illegitimate (later homonym for a genus of grass Desmazeria) and they replaced it by a new name, Niebla. They distinguished Niebla pulchribarbara from Niebla homalea and also from one other new species they described (Niebla josecuervoi) by the medulla reaction to para-phenylenediamine chemical spot test, depsidones (pd+), depsides (pd-), while they also selected a different chemotype for each holotype, protocetraric acid for N. pulchribarbara, salazinic acid for N. josecuervoi. However, the two new species were distinguished by the habit of the thallus, saxicolous with branches connected to a basal holdfast (N. josecuervoi), and terricolous, lying loose on sand (N. pulchribarbara). Richard Spjut distinguished the two species by their lichen substances and branching patterns that resulted in describing two more terricolous species with salazinic acid in order to clarify their taxonomy: Niebla effusa was recognized by terminal dilated and fringed branches, and Niebla arenaria by the antler-like terminal branches. Niebla pulchribarbara is recognized by its secondary metabolite, the only species in the genus to contain protocetraric acid.

Only four specimens of Niebla pulchribarbara were cited by Spjut in his taxonomic revision of Niebla. Three are at the United States National Herbarium of which two were collected by Spjut from a mesa above San Antonio del Mar, 25 March 1988 and 13 April 1990; the third was from Bahía de San Quintín, the type locality; it was collected by Velva E. Rudd in late January 1972 in regard to the Edward Palmer Project. She apparently found it with Niebla palmeri (Rudd 3340a).

Although Niebla pulchribarbara was considered distinct from N. josecuervoi by Rundel and Bowler when they described the species in 1972, Bowler and Janet Marsh in 2004 decided they were no longer distinct; N. pulchribarbara was included under a broad species concept of N. josecuervoi in the Lichen Flora of the Greater Sonoran Desert. Inconsistencies as a result of broadening the genus and species concepts are reported.
