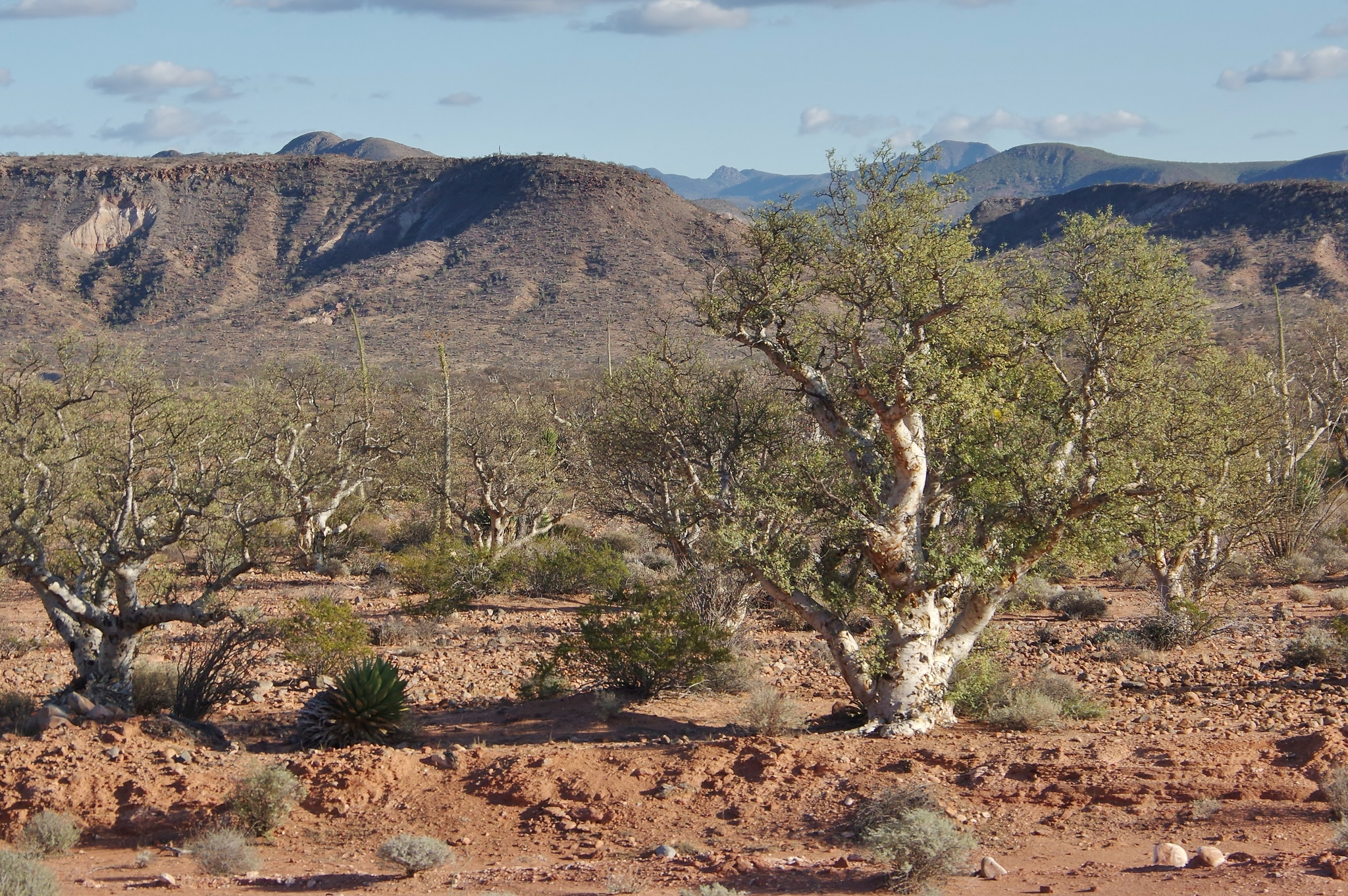

Conservation status
- Least Concern (IUCN 3.1)

Scientific classification
- Kingdom: Plantae
- Clade: Tracheophytes
- Clade: Angiosperms
- Clade: Eudicots
- Clade: Rosids
- Order: Sapindales
- Family: Anacardiaceae
- Subfamily: Anacardioideae
- Genus: Pachycormus; Coville ex Standl.
- Species: P. discolor

Binomial name
- Pachycormus discolor (Benth.) Coville ex Standl.

Synonyms
- Synonymy: Schinus discolor Benth., (1844); Veatchia discolor (Benth.) Brandegee, (1889); Rhus veatchiana Kellogg, (1863); Veatchia cedrosensis A.Gray, (1884); Veatchia discolor var. pubescens (S.Watson) I.M.Johnst. (1924); Veatchia discolor var. veatchiana (Kellogg) I.M.Johnst. (1924); Bursera pubescens S.Watson, (1889)

= Pachycormus discolor =

Species of flowering plant

Pachycormus is a monotypic genus of flowering plants in the cashew family commonly known as the Baja elephant tree, torote blanco, or copalquín. The single species Pachycormus discolor is endemic to the Baja California peninsula, with three varieties. This sarcocaulescent tree or shrub is characterized by its unique gnarled growth habit, skin-like exfoliating bark, and succulent nature, whose appearance has been colorfully described as "the proboscis of an elephant holding a nosegay," a "huge radish protruding from the ground," or "grotesque resemblances of the flexed limbs of a corpulent human being." This drought-deciduous species spends most of the year dormant, but following rains pinnate green leaves emerge, and in the late spring to summer the leaves yellow, fall, and give way to bright red, cream, or pink flowers that give it a striking appearance in bloom.

== Description ==
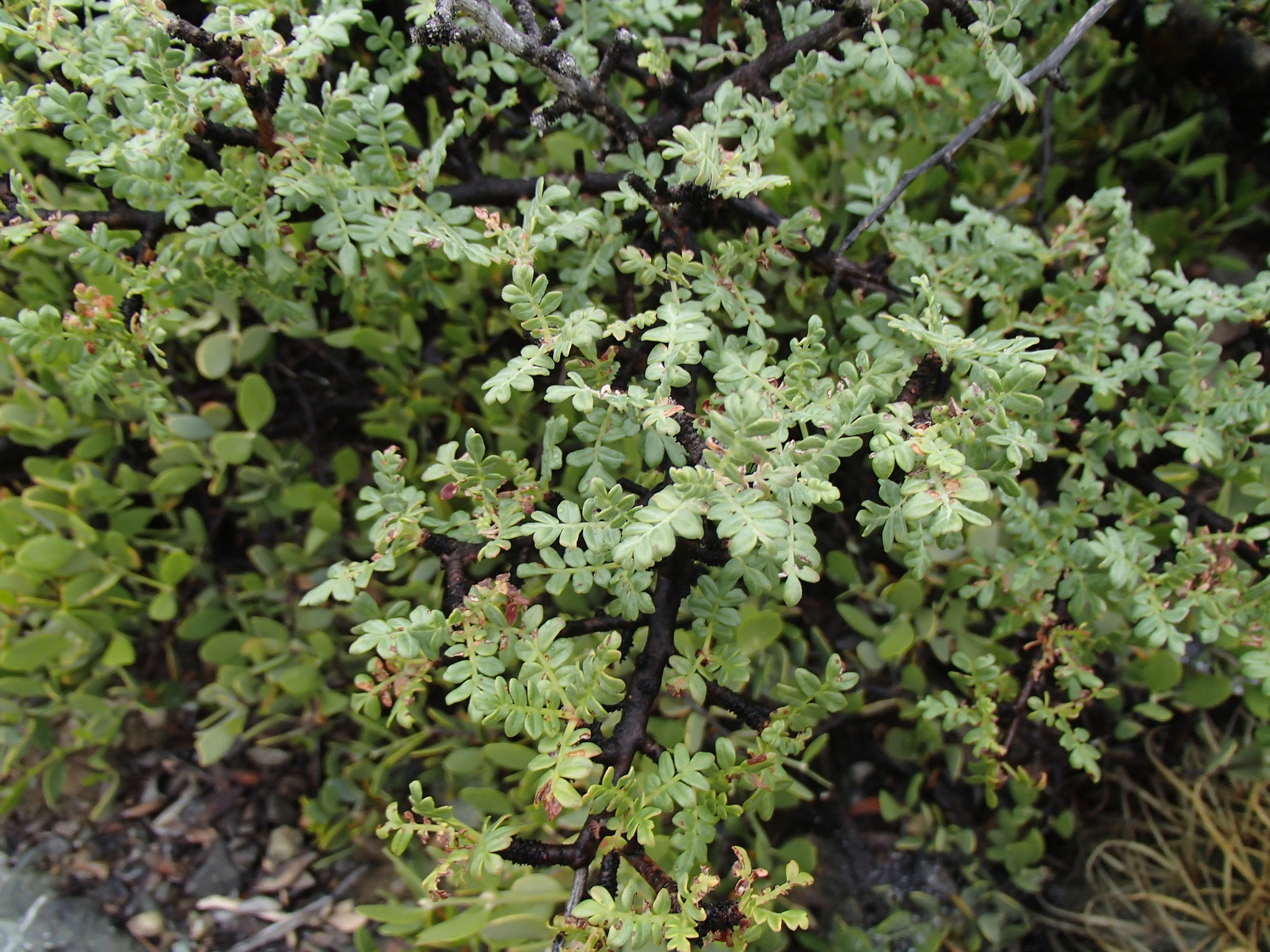
Detail of the leaves of var. veatchiana on Cedros Island

This species is a tree or shrub (rarely) with a gnarled growth habit that can result in bizarre shapes and forms. On the Pacific coast, in areas with strong coastal winds, the growth habit is usually prostrate or sprawling. The trunk is usually 60 to 80 cm (24 to 31 in) in diameter and covered in a smooth, exfoliating, skin-like epidermis (the outer bark). Beneath the papery outer bark, which exfoliates annually, is a spongey, blue-green photosynthetic inner bark 2.54 to 5.08 cm (1.00 to 2.00 in) thick. The inner bark exudes a milky sap that dries clear and hardens into a gum or resin.

The leaves are dark green, pinnately compound, pubescent, and drought deciduous, yellowing first before they drop. There are 3 to 15 leaflets, measuring 3 to 10 mm (0.12 to 0.39 in) long and shaped oval or oblong. The herbage is puberulent. Leaf size is variable within the infraspecies. The inflorescence is a panicle. The flowers are dioecious, and are colored yellowish, pink or red (the color varying per variety). The petals are accrescent, about 5 mm (0.20 in) long and with an acute tip. The fruits are shorter than the petals, and are pubescent. The flowers appear in May, and can bloom into September, depending on moisture levels.

== Taxonomy ==
=== Etymology ===
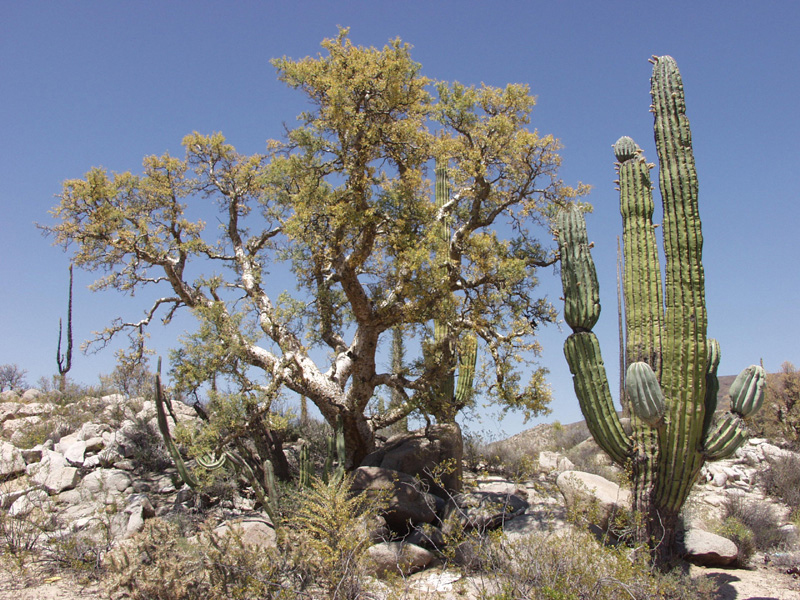
Growing in the vicinity of Cataviña with Pachycereus pringlei

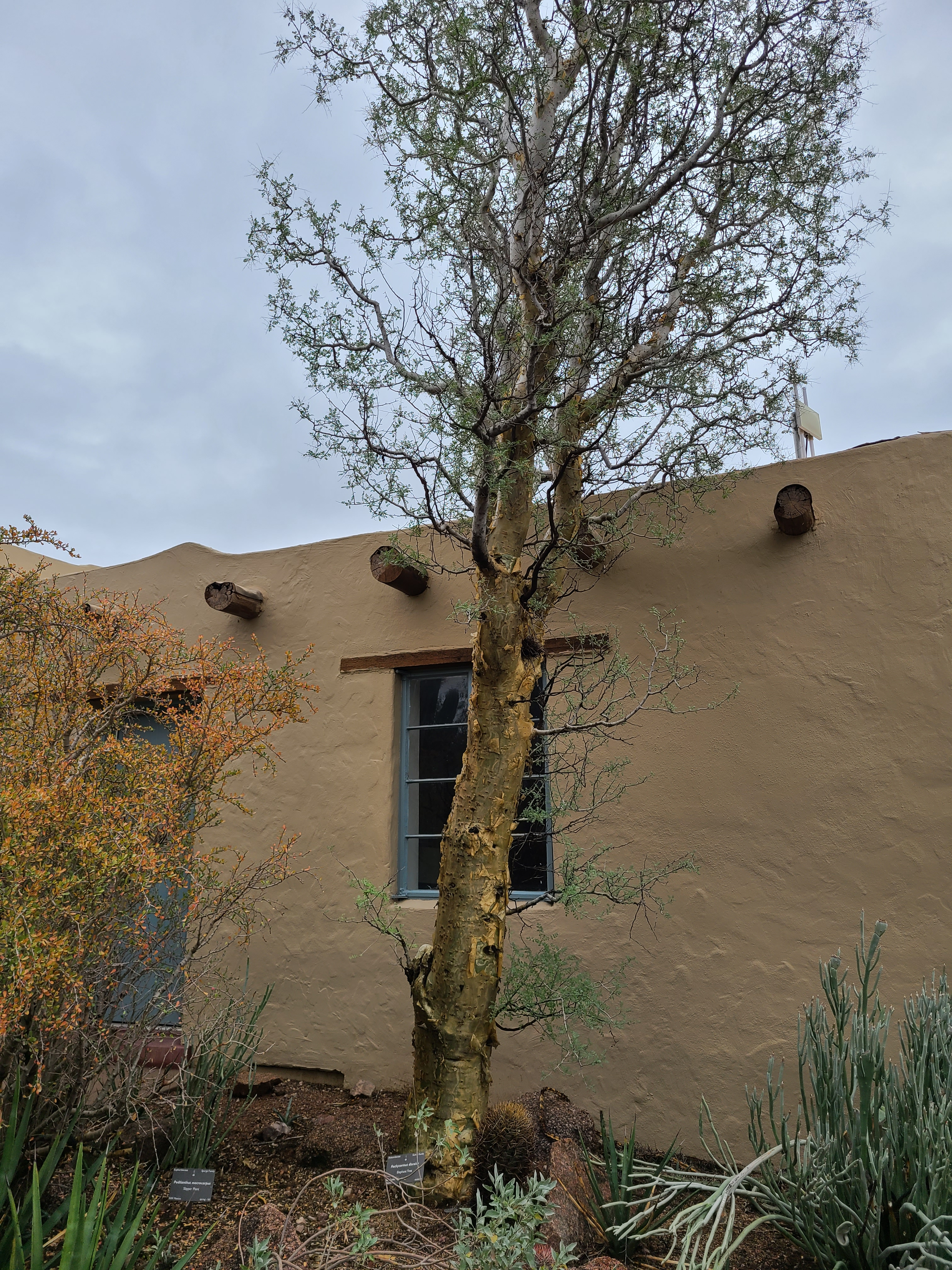
Pachycormus discolor (elephant tree) at the Desert Botanical Garden

The generic name refers to the Greek pachy for "thick" and kormos for "trunk," referring to the thick caudiciform trunk. The common name is derived from the thick size of the trunk relative to the tree, like that of an elephant. The common name "elephant tree" is also applied to Bursera microphylla as well as other species.

=== Subdivisions ===
- Pachycormus discolor var. discolor — Commonly known as the Magdalena elephant tree. The autonymic variety, with larger leaves than the other two varieties. Endemic to Baja California Sur.
- Pachycormus discolor var. pubescens (S. Watson) Gentry — Commonly known as the Baja California elephant tree. The most common variety, with a more open inflorescence and smaller flowers than var. veatchiana.
- Pachycormus discolor var. veatchiana (Kellogg) Gentry — Commonly known as the Veatch elephant tree. A rare variety with smaller leaves and distinct larger, conspicuously pubescent rose-colored flowers. Restricted to Cedros Island, Isla Natividad, and the western Vizcaino Peninsula.

== Distribution and habitat ==
This species is endemic to the Baja California peninsula of Mexico, occupying the states of Baja California and Baja California Sur. The three varieties are subsequently endemic to their own parts of the peninsula. San Fernando Velicatá delimits the northern vicinity of this species, with variety pubescens found from there to the lower part of the peninsula near La Paz and various Gulf islands. In the far western parts of the peninsula, var. veatchiana occupies the western margins of the Vizcaino desert, Cedros Island, and the Natividad islands. In the south-western part of the peninsula, var. discolor is found on the islands of Magdalena Bay and the western flanks of the southern Sierra de La Giganta.

This species is primarily restricted to the Baja California desert and the Vizcaino desert, but can also be found in more temperate montane habitats, such as in the mountains of the Sierra de La Giganta and the Gulf islands. In the Sierra de La Giganta, the variety discolor grows sparsely on the mountain sides, but in ravines it can form impenetrable groves, and is found from sea level to an elevation of 1,500 ft (460 m). On Cedros Island, var. veatchiana is found in alluvial fans and canyons, growing tallest in these locations, and also coastal localities where it takes a prostrate form, in the desert parts of the island.

Typical habitats of this species in the north and central parts of its range (Laguna Chapala in Baja California and San Ignacio in Baja California Sur) are characterized by high temperatures in the summer, usually 34 to 45 °C (93 to 113 °F) in the day, and with temperatures that can fall to 3 °C (37 °F) on mild winter nights. Rain is mostly a result of Eastern Pacific hurricanes from August to October, but some years have no rainfall at all while others receive some winter rain from the north.

== Uses ==
Plants are grown in containers by caudiciform succulent aficionados. Plants do best in full sun. Only seed grown specimens develop the caudex. This species is marginally frost tolerant, with tip damage at 32 °F (0 °C), death at 25 °F (−4 °C).

Considerable quantities of the bark were once exported to Europe for use in tanning.
