= Niebla palmeri =

Scientific classification
- Kingdom: Fungi
- Division: Ascomycota
- Class: Lecanoromycetes
- Order: Lecanorales
- Family: Ramalinaceae
- Genus: Niebla
- Species: N. palmeri

Binomial name
- Niebla palmeri Spjut (1996)

Species of lichen

Niebla palmeri is a fruticose lichen that infrequently occurs on sandy beaches or gravelly soil along the Pacific Coast from San Diego, California to mesas just north of Punta Baja, about 15 miles southeast of El Rosario, Baja California. The epithet, palmeri is in honor of an Edward Palmer who collected the species in the vicinity of San Diego and on Isla Coronado.

== Distinguishing features ==
Niebla palmeri is distinguished by a hemispherical mat-like thallus, divided into numerous tangled irregular shaped subtubular branches, varying from nearly linear throughout to a thallus with variously dilated and flattened segments, to 8 cm high and 16 cm across, and by containing sekikaic acid, with triterepenes.

== Taxonomic history ==
Niebla palmeri was described by Richard Spjut as a result of undertaking at taxonomic revision of the genus Niebla in regard to developing a lichen flora of Baja California. Only five specimens of N. palmeri were reported to have been collected, all at the United States National Herbarium (Smithsonian Institution, Museum of Natural History, Department of Botany), which includes one of his collections obtained from a mesa above Punta Baja; however, Phillip Rundel and Peter Bowler recognized a “sekikaic acid race” of Niebla homalea at Colina del Sudoeste, Bahía de San Quintín “limited to shrubs growing on sand dunes and to lava surfaces on lower slopes”. A specimen cited by Spjut was collected on sand at Bahía de San Quintín by Velva E. Rudd (3340A) in late January 1972 in regard to the Edward Palmer Project.

Niebla palmeri has been included under a very broad species concept, (Niebla homalea); one that essentially recognizes only three species in the genus Niebla as defined by a two-layered cortex, by isolated chondroid strands in the medulla, and by the lichen substances lacking the terpenes found in Vermilacinia. Under the broad species concept, the morphological differences are seen as environmentally induced variation, and the chemical differences as chemo-syndrome variation however, no data were presented to support this view other than reference to studies of other genera in which the species differences mentioned are not applicable.
