= Niebla effusa =

Scientific classification
- Kingdom: Fungi
- Division: Ascomycota
- Class: Lecanoromycetes
- Order: Lecanorales
- Family: Ramalinaceae
- Genus: Niebla
- Species: N. effusa

Binomial name
- Niebla effusa Spjut (1996)

Species of lichen

Niebla effusa is a fruticose lichen that grows on gravelly soil along the foggy Pacific Coast of Baja California from near Punta Colonet south to near Punta Rosarito. The epithet, effusa is in reference to the thallus spreading widely along the surface.

== Distinguishing features ==
Niebla effusa is recognized by the thallus divided into a tangled mat of irregularly cylindrical-prismatic branches without a central connection at base–to as much as 1 meter in diameter, weighing more than 1 kg—and by the ultimate parts of the primary branches becoming hooked, dilated, and fringed from which there are many erect branchlets. Black dot-like pycnidia are usually infrequent and scattered along the branch margins and cortical ridges. A key lichen substance is salazinic acid, which may be accompanied by an unknown, possibly scabrosin derivative. Triterpenes are absent as in all species in the depsidone species group.

== Taxonomic history ==
Niebla effusa was first recognized as a distinct species from a related species, Niebla josecuervoi, before it was described as a result of collecting lichen samples near Cerro Solo in northern Baja California for a biodiversity screening of lichens—in the search of new drugs by the National Cancer Institute (NCI) Natural Products Branch to treat HIV. It was distinguished by its habit of growing on the ground in contrast to N. josecuervoi growing on a vertical face of a large bounder with Niebla eburnea and Vermilacinia procera. A sample of 68 grams of Niebla josecuervoi was submitted to the NCI on 8 February 1986, but not of N. effusa. based on its thalli with a holdfast.

Niebla effusa seems to have been recognized earlier as a terricolous species that forms extensive mats “on beach terrace deposits atop coastal bluffs south of El Rosario and beyond, often in densities great enough to color the landscape yellow-green," based on study of lichen communities further north around Bahía de San Quintín. However, the terricolous species around Bahía de San Quintín is largely N. arenaria, whereas further south N. effusa is common. These species were recognized as Niebla pulchribarbara, which the type reportedly contained protocetraric acid, a rare chemotype for the genus not found south of Bahía de San Quintín. Another terricolous species, containing sekikaic acid, occurred at Bahía de San Quintín, described as Niebla palmeri.

Niebla effusa is a characteristic lichen of the transition zone from the California Floristic Province to the Northern Vizcaíno Desert. The species has been included under a broader concept, Niebla josecuervoi, one that also includes Niebla pulchribarbara and many other species of Niebla
