= Niebla contorta =

Scientific classification
- Kingdom: Fungi
- Division: Ascomycota
- Class: Lecanoromycetes
- Order: Lecanorales
- Family: Ramalinaceae
- Genus: Niebla
- Species: N. contorta

Binomial name
- Niebla contorta Spjut (1996)

Species of lichen

Niebla contorta is a fruticose lichen that grows along the fog regions of the Pacific Coast of North America on the Vizcaíno Peninsula and on the Isla Santa Margarita of Baja California. The epithet, contorta, is in regard to the twisted branches of the thallus.

== Distinguishing features ==
Niebla contorta is recognized by the thallus divided into relatively short tubular-prismatic branches, usually less than 3.5 cm high, that arise from a central basal attachment area, the branches often dilated or irregularly widened and compressed towards apex, occasionally dividing or often with short secondary twisted branches, short wavy (undulate) along margins, especially the upper parts of branches or lobes. Black dot-like pycnidia are common along the margins and cortical ridges of the upper parts of branches. The cortical surface is recessed between the ridges. The recessed area of the cortex appears to be related to the relatively thinner cortex, usually 45–75 μm thick, in contrast to that of Niebla eburnea, a similar species that has turgid to slightly inflated branches with a mostly smooth cortex, 65–150 μm thick. Lichen substances are divaricatic acid with unidentified accessory triterpenes and pigments that blackened the basal area of the thallus. Other similar species are Niebla caespitosa, distinguished by the more flattened branches with jagged margins, N. undulata, distinguished by its larger size, and N. dilatata that differs by its larger size and more rounded terminal lobes.

== Taxonomic history ==
Niebla contorta was first collected near Bahía Asunción, 14 May 1986, in regard to developing a lichen flora of Baja California. It was reportedly common near the beach on white calcareous outcrops, a composite of fossilized sea shells, decomposed limestone (gypsum), and quartz It was later collected near Punta Eugenia and on Isla Santa Margarita.
