= Niebla caespitosa =

Scientific classification
- Kingdom: Fungi
- Division: Ascomycota
- Class: Lecanoromycetes
- Order: Lecanorales
- Family: Ramalinaceae
- Genus: Niebla
- Species: N. caespitosa

Binomial name
- Niebla caespitosa Spjut (1996)

Species of lichen

Niebla caespitosa is a fruticose lichen that grows along the fog regions of the Pacific Coast of North America from southern California, including the Channel Islands, to the Vizcaíno Peninsula of Baja California. The epithet, caespitosa, is in regard to the clustered thallus branches spreading widely from a central attachment or holdfast

== Distinguishing features ==
Niebla caespitosa is recognized by the thallus divided into broad strap-like contorted branches that arise from a central basal attachment area, the outer branches wide spreading, the inner more erect, usually dilated or irregularly widened and flattened towards apex, occasionally dividing, and often with short broad lobes. Black dot-like pycnidia are common along the margins of the upper parts of branches and lobes and in between the margins on the prominent reticulate ridges. The contortion of the branches is due to the relatively thinner cortex, usually 45–75 μm thick, in contrast to that of Niebla testudinaria, a similar species, which its branches appear less contorted due to a relatively thicker cortex, 75–150 μm thick. Lichen substances are divaricatic acid with unidentified accessory triterpenes and near base pigments are evident by the blackened cortex. Other similar species are Niebla flabellata, distinguished by containing the lichen substance salazinic acid, and N. spatulata, distinguished by containing hypoprotocetraric acid.

== Taxonomic history ==
Niebla caespitosa was first collected just north of Punta Santa Rosalillita (vicinity of Rancho San Andrés, 2 May 1985, as part of a 100 gram sample that largely contained N. caespitosa to be submitted for anti-HIV screening by the National Cancer Institute, but the sample was not immediately submitted because it contained thalli of N. flabellata and N. flagelliforma; the former is distinguished by having salazinic acid as indicated above, the latter by terminal flagelliform branchlets; 55 grams were later submitted (14 Nov 1985) to the National Cancer Institute (NCI) Natural Products Branch, among 63 other lichen samples, 59 of which were from Oregon. The sample was accessioned as WBA-202 with reference to the collection number S & M 9073 (for Richard Spjut & Richard Marin), identified as Niebla aff. testudinaria.
