= Terricolous lichen =

Lichens that grow on soil

A terricolous lichen is a lichen that grows on the soil as a substrate. Examples include some members of the genus Peltigera. These lichens help stabilise soil and prevent erosion, contributing to soil fertility.

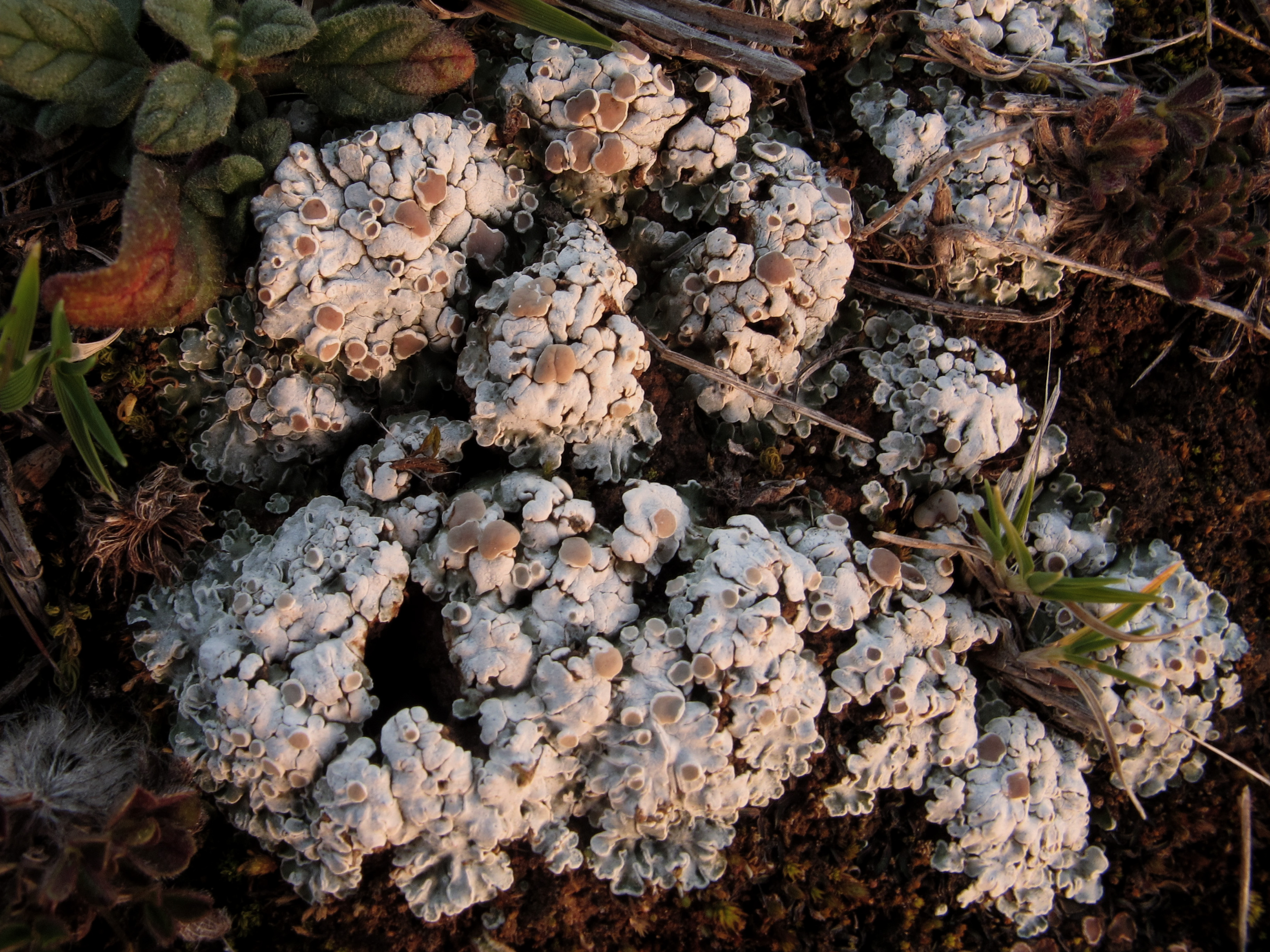
Squamarina lentigera growing on soil
