= Niebla josecuervoi =

Scientific classification
- Kingdom: Fungi
- Division: Ascomycota
- Class: Lecanoromycetes
- Order: Lecanorales
- Family: Ramalinaceae
- Genus: Niebla
- Species: N. josecuervoi

Binomial name
- Niebla josecuervoi (Rundel & Bowler) Rundel & Bowler (1978)

Species of lichen

Niebla josecuervoi is a fruticose lichen that grows on rock, stony soil and sand along the Pacific Coast of northern Baja California from near Misión San Vicente Ferrer to Punta Santa Rosalilillita. The epithet, josecuervoi is in honor of a field assistant, “Jose Cuervo”.

== Distinguishing features ==
Niebla josecuervoi is distinguished by the thallus divided into linear-prismatic branches initially developing from a common attachment base (or holdfast); the outer basal branches generally creeping or ascending near the ground for some distance, central branches ascending to erect, all dividing irregularly and frequently above, bearing many short spine-like branchlets along the upper side, collectively appearing comb-like; the whole thallus to 22 cm in diameter. The species (N. josecuervoi) also recognized by containing salazinic acid, without triterpenes. Similar species are Niebla arenaria that differs by the absence of a holdfast and by terminal short bifurcate, or antler-like, branchlets, Niebla effusa that has terminal flattened, hooked, and fringed branches, Niebla flabellata that differs by the irregular-shaped branches mostly flattened above a short tubular base, Niebla marinii distinguished by the wide angled branching (horseshoe-shaped), Niebla limicola distinguished by shortly bifurcate branchlets along lower dilated branches, Niebla pulchribarbara distinguished by containing protocetraric acid instead of salazinic acid, and the acid-deficient Niebla homaleoides.

== Taxonomic history ==
Niebla josecuervoi was first recognized by Phillip Rundel and Peter Bowler based on thalli “growing abundantly on basalt ridge of Colina del Sudoeste, Bahía de San Quintín, 28 March 1971” as a new species of Desmazieria (type specimen, salazinic acid, Rundel & Bowler 250, Univ. Calif. Irvine, Fig. 3), the genus name later replaced by Niebla. It was one of two new species they described for the genus, the other, Niebla pulchribarbara (as Desmazieria), was distinguished by the absence of a “basal attachment plate,” and also by the absence of apothecia, while further noted in the descriptions of the two species to differ in their chemotypes, salazinic acid (N. josecuervoi), protocetraric acid (N. pulchribarbara). It was also stated that N. josecuervoi is “typically saxicolous,” whereas it was unclear whether their interpretation of the terricolous species (N. pulchribarbara) included thalli with salazainic acid since only N. josecuervoi was mentioned as growing on sand (less than 2%) in their data (“Table 2”) on ground coverage of lichens at the type locality.

Richard Spjut, who conducted almost yearly expeditions to Baja California—two to four weeks duration—from 1985 to 1996, did not find Niebla with protocetraric acid south of Bahía de San Quintín among approximately 2,000 specimens of Niebla he analyzed by thin-layer chromatography. On 5 May 1986, Spjut, accompanied by John Cassady, Chairman of the Department of Medicinal Chemistry and Pharmacognosy at Purdue University, and later Dean of the School of Pharmacy at Ohio State University, along with his graduate student, Thomas McCloud, collected a 1 kg sample of a terricolous Niebla on sandy shore of Bahía Falsa at Bahía de San Quintín. Voucher material from that sample (WBA-333; was later designated as type for the newly described Niebla arenaria Niebla josecuervoi as recognized by Spjut is according to the morphological and chemical description provided by Rundel and Bowler but not according their ecological data.

Bowler and Janet Marsh in the Flora of the Greater Sonoran Desert did not provide a description for Niebla josecuervoi, but instead stated “see Niebla homalea for a description” with further reference to their discussion where it was concluded that only two species can be recognized—by the medulla reaction to para-phenylenediamine, depsidones (pd+), depsides (pd-).; however, the acid-deficient species recognized by Spjut (N. homaleoides) is chemically more related to the depsidone species group. Two descriptions were provided for N. homalea, one for rock forms and one for soil forms; soil forms were implicitly excluded from the nomenclature list of synonyms by stating “rock populations of N. homalea thalli have spot tests negative, except P+ (synonym Niebla pulchribarbara; see Niebla josecuervoi), K+ when salazinic or protocetraric acids are present (See Niebla josecuervoi).” It appears that the description under N. homalea was intended for the two species, a practice that deviates from that traditionally published in floras. As was the case in the 1972 publication, the data and discussion for the soil inhabiting Nieblas in the Sonoran Desert flora are conflicting. Additionally, the distribution map shown for Niebla josecuervoi indicated only four areas of occurrences on the main peninsula of Baja California and one for Guadalupe Island; species with depsidones do not occur on Guadalupe Island. Niebla josecuervoi was recognized by Spjut as “common on lowland rocky terraces and mesas, occasional on stones of mountains ridges,” in the “Northern Vizcaíno Desert” and “transitional vegetation to California Chaparral.”
