= Sebastián Vizcaíno Bay =

Bay in Baja California and Baja California Sur, Mexico

Coordinates: 28°00′N 114°30′W

Sebastián Vizcaíno Bay (Spanish: Bahía de Sebastián Vizcaíno) is a prominent bay along the west coast of the Baja California Peninsula in northwestern Mexico. It is named after explorer Sebastián Vizcaíno, who explored its coast in 1602.

== Geography ==
The bay lies on the Pacific Ocean coast of Baja California state in San Quintín Municipality, and of Baja California Sur state in Mulegé Municipality.

Cedros Island and Isla Natividad are located within the bay, and west of the mainland Vizcaíno Peninsula.

Sebastián Vizcaíno Bay is protected within the El Vizcaíno Biosphere Reserve.

== Ecology ==
Sebastián Vizcaíno Bay is an important nursery for baby great white sharks.

== See also ==
- Pacific Coast of Mexico
- Cedros Island topics
