= Sekikaic acid =

Chemical compound found in some lichens

Names
- IUPAC name 2-Hydroxy-3-(2-hydroxy-4-methoxy-6-propylbenzoyl)oxy-4-methoxy-6-propylbenzoic acid

Identifiers
CAS Number	607-11-4
3D model (JSmol)	Interactive image
ChEBI	CHEBI:144301
ChEMBL	ChEMBL4649759
ChemSpider	10294257
PubChem CID	12315460
- InChI: InChI=1S/C22H26O8/c1-5-7-12-9-14(28-3)11-15(23)17(12)22(27)30-20-16(29-4)10-13(8-6-2)18(19(20)24)21(25)26/h9-11,23-24H,5-8H2,1-4H3,(H,25,26) Key: CPHXGYQLOSNELY-UHFFFAOYSA-N
- SMILES: CCCC1=CC(=C(C(=C1C(=O)O)O)OC(=O)C2=C(C=C(C=C2O)OC)CCC)OC

Properties
Chemical formula	C_{22}H_{26}O_{8}
Molar mass	418.442 g·mol^{−1}
Appearance	Rectangular prisms or rhombic plates
Melting point	150–151 °C (302–304 °F; 423–424 K)
- Except where otherwise noted, data are given for materials in their standard state (at 25 °C [77 °F], 100 kPa). Infobox references

Sekikaic acid is an organic compound in the structural class of chemicals known as depsides. It is found in some lichens. First isolated from Ramalina sekika, it is a fairly common lichen product in Ramalina and Cladonia, both genera of lichen-forming fungi. The species epithet of the powdery lichen Lepraria sekikaica refers to the presence of this substance—a rarity in genus Lepraria.

== Properties ==
In its purified form, sekikaic acid exists as colourless rectangular prisms or rhombic plates. Its molecular formula is C_{22}H_{26}0_{8}. It has a melting point of 150–151 °C (302–304 °F). An ethanolic solution of sekikaic acid reacts with iron(III) chloride to produce a violet colour. Its ultraviolet spectrum has three peaks of maximum absorption (λ_{max}) at 219, 263, and 303 nm.

Sekikaic acid has been demonstrated to have several biological activities in laboratory experiments. These include antioxidant activity, inhibition of the enzymes α-glucosidase and α-amylase, hypoglycemic activity, and lipid-lowering activity. It also has antiviral activity against Respiratory syncytial virus, even more so than the standard antiviral medication ribavirin.

== Related compounds ==
The sekikaic acid chemosyndrome contains similar compounds that are metabolically related to sekikaic acid. It comprises sekikaic acid as the major compound, and 4'O-demethylsekikaic and homosekikaic acids as satellite metabolites.
