= Vermilacinia tigrina =

Scientific classification
- Kingdom: Fungi
- Division: Ascomycota
- Class: Lecanoromycetes
- Order: Lecanorales
- Family: Ramalinaceae
- Genus: Vermilacinia
- Species: V. tigrina

Binomial name
- Vermilacinia tigrina (Follmann) Spjut & Hale (1995)

Synonyms
- Ramalina tigrina Follmann (1966); Niebla tigrina (Follmann) Rundel & Bowler (1978)

Species of lichen

Vermilacinia tigrina is a fruticose lichen that grows on branches of shrubs and on earth among cactus and shrubs in the fog regions along the Pacific Coast of North America and South America; in North America found in the Channel Islands and near San Diego, California, and in central and southern Baja California; and in South America from Peru to Chile. The epithet is in reference to the irregular black spots or bands on the thallus branches.

== Distinguishing features ==
Vermilacinia tigrina is classified in the subgenus Cylindricaria in which it is distinguished from related species by a much-branched thallus 2.5–5 cm (0.98–1.97 in) in length and in width, by the narrow tubular branches, 1–2 mm (0.039–0.079 in) wide, by the development of apothecia instead of soredia, and by having lichen substances of one or more depsidones (hypoprotocetraric acid, salazinic acid, norstictic acid, psoromic acid), in addition to terpenoid compounds that characterize the genus. The terpenoid compounds are zeorin, (-)-16-hydroxykaurane, and an unknown (T3); bourgeanic acid is also probably present. In Baja California, the species often hangs in mats with species of Ramalina from branches of Fouquieria diguetii.

== Taxonomic History ==
Vermilacinia tigrina was first described by Gerhard Follmann in the genus Ramalina, based on a thallus growing on the ground among cacti in the Atacama Desert at 600 m (2,000 ft) elevation on Cerro Moreno in northern Chile. He distinguished the species by its lichen substance of psoromic acid, and by its habit of growing on earth (terricolous). This was in contrast to other species of Ramalina he recognized in a “Ceruchis” group, largely defined by the presence of (-)-16-hydroxykaurane (“ceruchinol”). Included were Ramalina “homalea” (data probably combined from Niebla homalea and Vermilacinia laevigata), Ramalina “ceruchis” (= Vermilacinia ceruchis), Ramalina “combeoides” (= Vermilacinia combeoides), Ramalina “tumidula” (included under V. ceruchis), Ramalina flaccescens (= Vermilacinia flaccescens), and unpublished name Ramalina “ceruchoides”. Follmann incorporated chemical data from other studies not based on type specimens; for example, Ramalina tumidula was indicated to have methyl 3,5 dichlorolecanorate (tumidulin), which is not present in the type specimen. Nevertheless, none of these species had psoromic acid (except for V. tigrina).

This “Ceruchis” group of species was subsequently included in the genus Desmazieria in 1969, based in part on a misconception that Niebla homalea included two chemotypes, one with the divaricatic acid and another without the depside but with (-)-16-hydroxykaurane. as previously indicated in 1965 by Gerd Bendz, Johan Santesson and Carl Axel Wachtmeister. The genus Desmazieria was previously recognized to have only one species, D. homalea. Follmann reported its nomenclatural conflict with a genus of grasses (Poaceae), Desmazeria that led Phillip Rundel and Peter Bowler to create a new genus name, Niebla.

In a 1981 study of the cortical structure of the Ramalinaceae, Bowler recognized that: “Within Niebla two major evolutionary directions have influenced the anatomy of the cortex. The compressed species have strongly palisade outer cortices overlying mechanical tissue, while the terete species have tended to lose or have depauperate formations of mechanical tissue.” In 1995, Richard Spjut further recognized significant differences in their medulla (chondroid strands vs. no chondroid strands) and in their lichen substances (zeorin and (-)-16-hydroxykaurane vs. their absence). The two evolutionary lines thus became Niebla and Vermilacinia. Niebla tigrina, consequently, was transferred to Vermilacinia tigrina.

Follmann had distinguished Ramalina tumidula (basionym: Usnea tumidula) from his R. tigrina (= Vermilacinia tigrina) by having hypoprotocetraric acid instead of psoromic acid; however, Spjut broadened the species concept of Vermilacinia tigrina to include not only that chemotype but also other chemotypes, salazinic acid and norstictic acid chemotypes, which occur in central and southern Baja California and in the Channel Islands, while on the northern peninsula of Baja California, this is replaced by the acid deficient V. leopardina. The type specimen of Usnea tumidula was found to have the same chemistry as the type specimen for Vermilacinia ceruchis, and its cortical characteristics compared favorably with subgenus Vermilacinia but not with subgenus Cylindricaria. Vermilacinia tigrina was not mentioned in the Flora of the Greater Sonoran Desert.
