= Niebla sorocarpia =

Scientific classification
- Kingdom: Fungi
- Division: Ascomycota
- Class: Lecanoromycetes
- Order: Lecanorales
- Family: Ramalinaceae
- Genus: Niebla
- Species: N. sorocarpia

Binomial name
- Niebla sorocarpia Spjut (1996)

Species of lichen

Niebla sorocarpia is a fruticose lichen that grows on rocks along the foggy Pacific Coast of California in the Channel Islands (San Miguel Island) and in Baja California in the Northern Vizcaíno Desert. The epithet, sorocarpia, is in reference to the terminal aggregate apothecia.

== Distinguishing features ==
Niebla sorocarpia is characterized by a turgid hemispherical thallus divided into subtubular branches from a yellowish to yellowish orange pigmented holdfast, to 10 cm high and 12 cm across; the primary branches expanded above, palm-like and contorted from which finger to tongue-shaped lobes arise with dense aggregates of undeveloped isidia (isidium)-like apothecia or with isidia-like pycnidia, occasionally primary branches not expanded, remaining mostly linear with terminal aggregates of aborted apothecia; the whole thallus resembling broccoli. The species (N. sorocarpia) further recognized by the relatively thick cortex, mostly 100–125 μm thick, in contrast to 35–75 μm thick, in the closely related Niebla undulata, covering a subfistulose medulla, the cortex eroding on terminal branches, the medulla exposed. Niebla sorocarpia is also identified by the lichen substance divaricatic acid, with unknown triterpenes, in contrast to sekikaic acid in Niebla lobulata. Pycnidia prominent on margins of upper branches, with a thalline-like margin. Similar species are Niebla undulata, distinguished by a smaller thallus with a short tubular base, and Niebla infundibula that differs by lack of aggregate apothecia and larger prominent pycnidia not elevated by the surrounding cortex.

== Taxonomic history ==
Niebla sorocarpia was first recognized by Richard Spjut, accompanied by Richard Marin and Thomas McCloud, on 19 May 1986 just south of Punta Negra on rock outcrops on a ridge that appeared to have received more precipitation from ocean fog than other nearby areas (Plate 1D in Spjut’s 1996 revision of Niebla and Vermilacinia). This particular ridge was observed during May 1985 by Spjut—while he and Marin were collecting samples of lichens in search of new drugs to treat HIV—to have fog lingering around the peaks most of the day. The following year, in May 1986, a special effort was made to find a path to the ridges and peaks. In addition to Niebla sorocarpia, other rare species of lichens were discovered, Niebla infundibula (divaricatic acid) and Vermilacinia rigida. The species (N. sorocarpia) was later collected on boulders further north along the main peninsula of Baja California, and from San Miguel Island It (N. sorocarpia) appears to be an infrequent species of boulder Niebla communities, occurring where moisture from fog is greater as related to topography.

Niebla sorocarpia has been interpreted to belong to a broad species concept of Niebla homalea, one that recognizes only three species in the genus, two by the medulla reaction to para-phenylenediamine, depsidones (pd+, Niebla josecuervoi), depsides (pd-, Niebla homalea) and one by isidia (Niebla isidiaescens), based on the genus concept defined by Spjut; however, the broad taxonomic concept has many inconsistencies.
