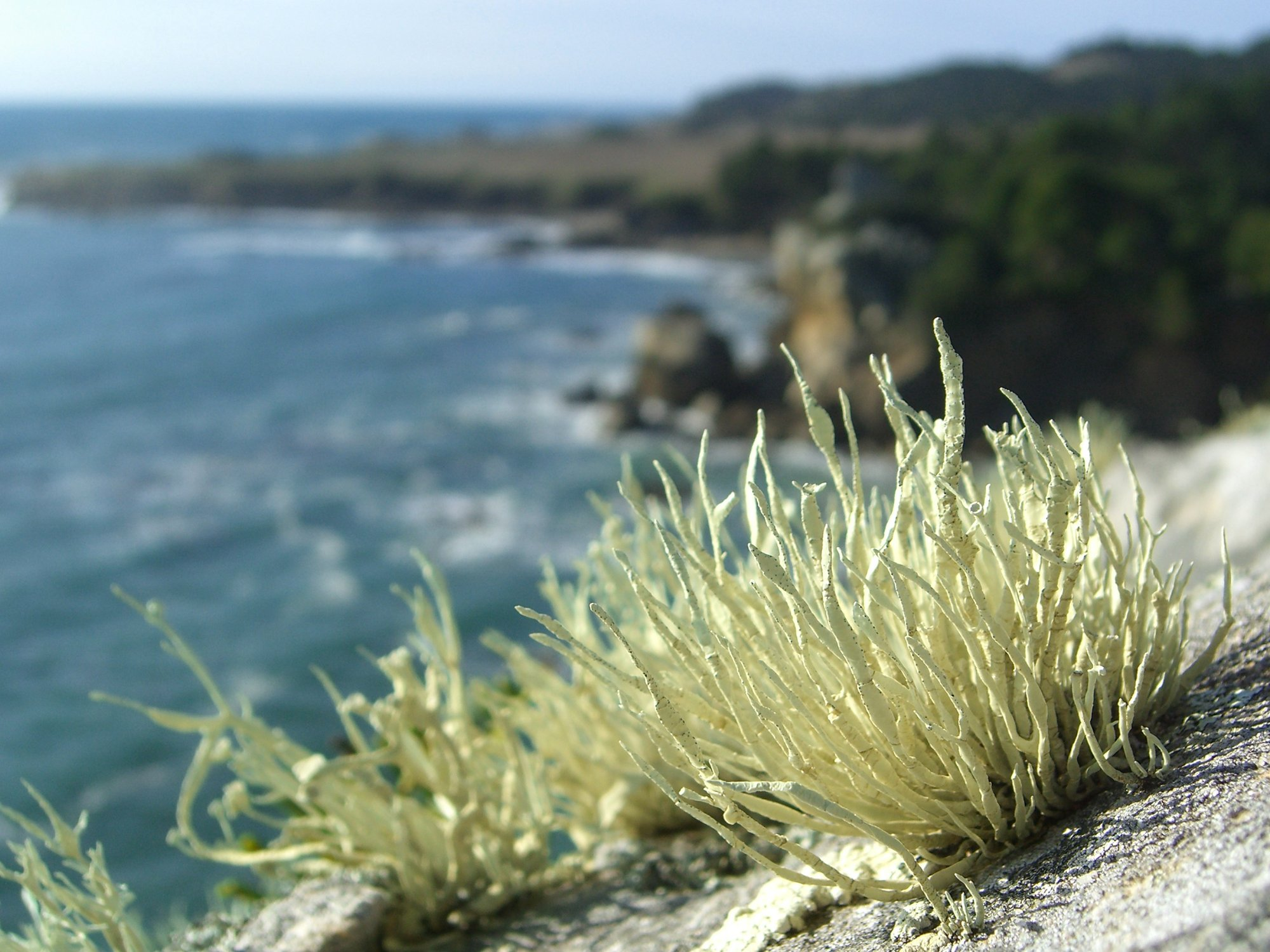

Conservation status
- Vulnerable (NatureServe)

Scientific classification
- Kingdom: Fungi
- Division: Ascomycota
- Class: Lecanoromycetes
- Order: Lecanorales
- Family: Ramalinaceae
- Genus: Niebla
- Species: N. homalea

Binomial name
- Niebla homalea (Ach.) Rundel & Bowler (1978)

Synonyms
- Ramalina homalea Ach. (1810); Parmelia homalea (Ach.) Spreng. (1827); Usnea homalea (Ach.) Tuck. (1845); Desmazieria homalea (Ach.) Mont. (1852)

= Niebla homalea =

Species of lichen

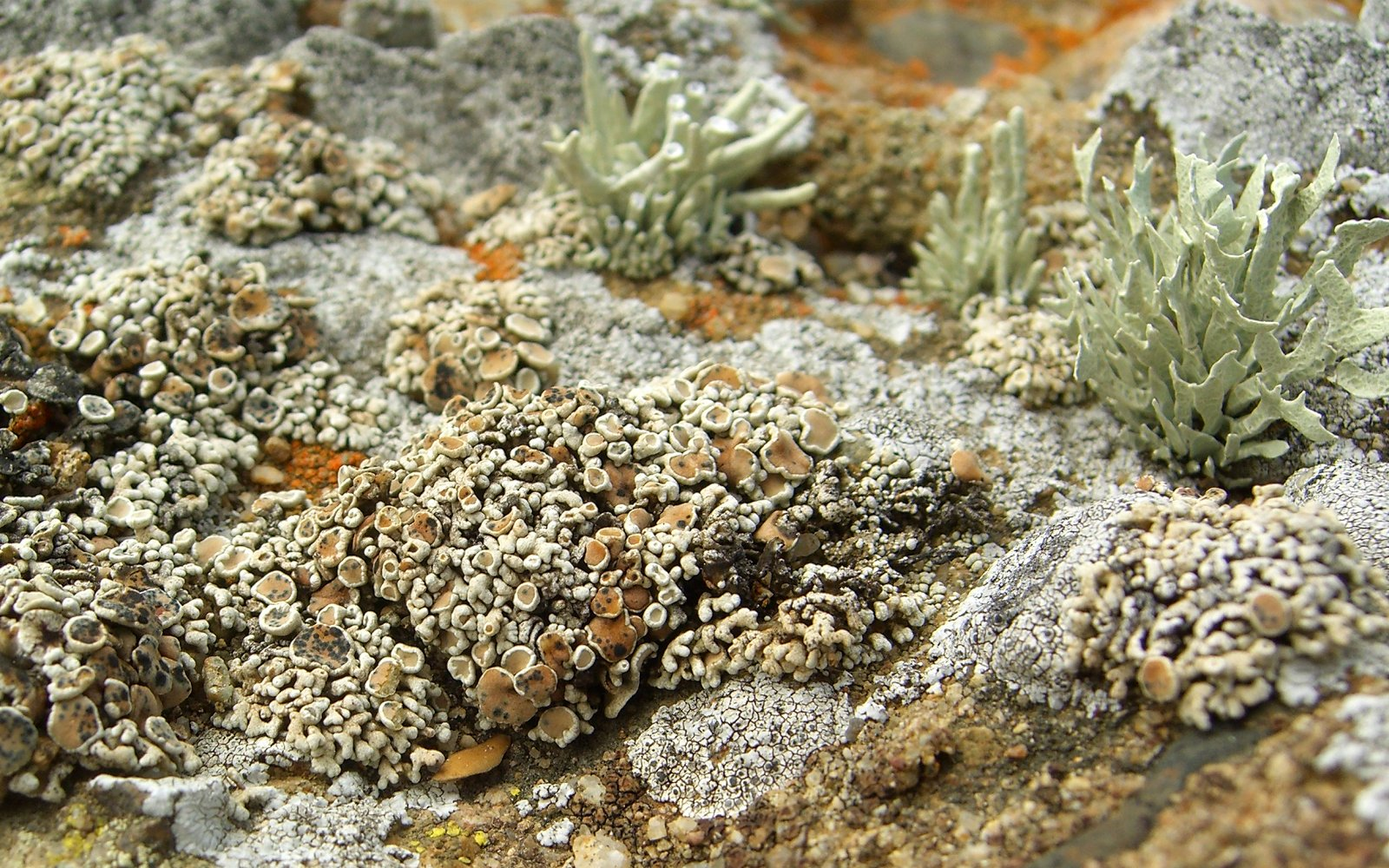
Armored Fog Lichens at Point Lobos State Reserve

Niebla homalea (armored sea-fog lichen) is a species of fruticose lichen that grows on rocks in foggy areas along the Pacific Coast of North America, from Mendocino County, California south to Bahía de San Quintín on the main peninsula of Baja California, with an isolated occurrence further south on vertical rock faces above Punta Camachos, and other occurrences in the Channel Islands and on Guadalupe Island. The epithet homalea, given by Acharius, suggests it was in regard to the branches appearing flattened.

== Distinguishing features ==
Niebla homalea is recognized by the thallus divided into narrow subcylindric, mostly linear shaped branches that have a glossy cortex frequently cracked along transverse ridges and by the branch margins alternating 90° in their orientation at frequent but irregular intervals; the branches are 4–8 cm long, 1–3 mm wide. Apothecia, when present, develop terminally, and are flattened towards base where attached to branch. The key lichen substance is divaricatic acid, with accessory triterpenes and usnic acid. Similar species include Niebla eburnea, distinguished by a glazed (ivory) cortex, often with wrinkles or ripples instead of transverse cracks, and by the branch margins alternating with the cortical ridges more near base and apex; Niebla testudinaria, distinguished by the reticulate ridges between branch margins, and Niebla disrupta that differs by the lichen substance, sekikaic acid. Both N. eburnea and N. testudinaria frequently have irregularly dilated branches, especially above mid region, which helps separate them from N. homalea. Niebla disrupta generally has apothecia, usually more developed below mid region of the thallus, and usually with an extended spine-like branch, whereas in N. homalea, apothecia appear less frequent and mature more near apex of branches, often on a short truncated branch, occasionally with a continuing flattened branch.

== Taxonomic history ==
Niebla homalea, which is classified in the family Ramalinaceae, was originally describedin 1810 by Swedish botanist Erik Acharius as a species of Ramalina based on a specimen collected by Archibald Menzies on rocks around San Francisco. A related species described in 1803 by Acharius, Parmelia ceruchis, was transferred by Acharius to the genus Borrera and has since been recognized in Niebla, following transfer first to Ramalina by Giuseppe De Notaris in 1846

This, however, is only part of a long confusing history as to what defined Ramalina ceruchis (=Vermilacinia ceruchis), which has to be based on a type (biology) specimen, one that was collected also by Menzies, probably on sand in a fog region at Valparaiso Chile, while type material also includes a specimen collected by Joseph Dombey from Lima, Peru. The interpretation of Ramalina ceruchis of South America—over time—was broadened to include morphological variants that grew on rocks, bushes and cactus spines; sometimes classified in other genera such as Evernia, Roccella, and Usnea some recognized as different varieties and species. In 1852 they were all considered just one species that included the North American Ramalina homalea, treated by Jean Camille Montagne under a new genus, Desmazieria, comprising a single species named Desmazieria homalea Although Parmelia ceruchis (Acharius 1803) predates Ramalina homalea (Acharius 1810), the type species for the genus Niebla has to be typified by type of the name (basionym in this case) according to the International Code of Botanical Nomenclature (Art. 7.1, 7.2, and 7.3); thus, the type species in the genus (Niebla) has to be Niebla homalea., it is not Niebla ceruchis<ewd>Sérusiaux, E., P. Van den Boom, and D. Ertz. 2010. A two-gene phylogeny shows the lichen genus Niebla (Lecanorales) is endemic to the New World and does not occur in Macaronesia nor in the Mediterranean basin.

Lichenologists since Montagne (1852) have generally accepted that the North American and South American species belonged to the same genus, but not to the same species, and also not to Montagne’s genus (Desmazieria). For a long time (1861–1969), they were treated as different species in the genus Ramalina, classified either in a subgenus, or section, or series referred to as Desmazieria.<"Rundel1978" />, but also later became known as the “Ceruchis Group.” Ramalina homalea in this group consisted of two or more chemotypes, one with “deposit” related to efflorescence associated with the diterpene (-)-16 α-hydroxykaurane (ceruchdiol), and the other, no deposit, indicated to have, in addition to the diterpenes, divaricatic acid based on a report by Mason Hale; divaricatic acid has since been determined to be the chemotype of the type (Menzies) specimen., while it may be noted that Ramalina homalea, which was erroneously referred to as having the diterpene chemistry, was recognized as a new species of Vermilacinia by Richard Spjut in 1987 by annotation labels on specimens, and later in a manuscript peer reviewed 1990–1991;, however, the species was described in Niebla by Peter Bowler in 1994 without accounting for the type of Niebla homalea, or providing a description for the species.

The “Ceruchis Group” had included other South American and North American species that were described by William Nylander in 1870 based on morphology, R. combeoides (=Vermilacinia combeoides), R. flaccescens (=Vermilacinia flaccescens), R. testudinaria (=Niebla testudinaria), and by Gerhard Follmann in 1966, based on differences in secondary metabolites, Ramalina tigrina (=Vermilacinia tigrina). In 1969 Follmann and Huneck transferred the species in the “Ceruchis Group” to the genus Desmazieria. Phillip Rundel and Peter Bowler in 1972 described two more species in that genus. In 1976, Follmann recognized what he considered a possible conflict between the lichen genus Desmazieria and the grass genus Desmazeria that led Rundel and Bowler to transfer all the species in the “Ceruchis Group” to a new genus name, Niebla, to replace the homonym (illegitimate genus name Desmazieria), and elevated the taxonomic status of two infraspecies taxa, Niebla cephalota (=Vermilacinia cephalota) and Niebla robusta (=Vermilacinia robusta).

But the genus Niebla had not been clearly defined at the time it was created. Peter Bowler in 1981 recognized two evolutionary lines in Niebla, which comprised three groups, a Niebla homalea Group in one evolutionary line, the other line contained the Niebla combeoides group and the Niebla ceruchis group; the latter evolutionary line was described by Spjut as belonging to a new genus, Vermilacinia. Thus, the earlier “Ceruchis Group” had been divided into three groups. Recall from above that the South American Ramalina ceruchis had also not been clearly defined prior to Montagne, and while the type specimen may not have been recognized to be most similar to species that grew on rocks than on bushes, the interpretation in North America was that the “Ceruchis Group” applied only to thalli that for those that grew on trees and shrubs, and this interpretation then extended to species in South America. Added to this confusion are many studies that reported on lichen substances for species in the “Ceruchis Group” without a standard reference, the type specimen. It was not until Spjut’s taxonomic revision of the genus that the types for the North American species were accounted forNiebla had not been clearly defined at the time it was created. Peter Bowler in 1981 recognized two evolutionary lines in Niebla, which comprised three groups, a Niebla homalea“ group in one evolutionary line, the other line contained the Niebla combeoides group and the Niebla ceruchis group; the latter evolutionary line was described by Spjut as belonging to a new genus, Vermilacinia Thus, the earlier “Ceruchis Group” had been divided into three groups. Recall from above that the South American Ramalina ceruchis had also not been clearly defined prior to Montagne, and while the type specimen may not have been recognized to be most similar to species that grew on rocks than on bushes, the interpretation in North America was that the “Ceruchis Group” applied only to thalli that for those that grew on trees and shrubs, and this interpretation then extended to species in South America. Added to this confusion are many studies that reported on lichen substances for species in the “Ceruchis Group” without a standard reference, the type specimen. It was not until Spjut’s taxonomic revision of the genus that the types for the problematic species were clearly applied.

Niebla is distinguished from Vermilacinia not only by secondary metabolites, but also by differences in the morphology of the medulla in having chondroid strands and by the cortex two-layered cortex.

== Current interpretations and misinterpretations ==
The description provided above for Niebla homalea is based on that in Spjut.

Niebla was recognized by Spjut in 1996 to comprise 42 species, which Bowler and Marsh treated as three species, N. homalea, N. isidiaescens, and N. josecuervoi.

Bowler and Marsh gave two descriptions for Niebla homalea, one for “Rock forms” and the other for “Soil and sand populations.” The rock forms were described to contain lichen substances of depsidone and one acid-deficient species, whereas the soil and sand forms contain depsides. This is contrary to the key to the species that was presented. If this circumscription was adopted, then N. josecuervoi would be included under N. homalea; indeed, this interpretation is further indicated under notes given for the rock forms where N. josecuervoi is specifically mentioned as being included but probably in error. This alleged error is again repeated in the description for soil forms. Additionally, N. effusa, which has salazinic acid, is listed as a synonym of N. homalea under the general nomenclature, but omitted under “synonyms relative to secondary metabolites.” Other inconsistencies have been noted

The description in Lichens of North America. appears to be based in part on the photo provided of probably Niebla cornea, judging from strongly compressed branches with a polished cortex and terminal clusters of cup-shaped apothecia., while the geographical distribution shown for the species is mostly coastal Canada and Washington; however, the species is not known north of Mendocino County, California. Niebla cornea has sekikaic acid. It can be difficult to distinguish morphologically from Niebla eburnea, which the identification is best confirmed by determination of the secondary metabolite, divaricatic acid.

Synonyms proposed by Bowler and Marsh do not necessarily mean that all the different species recognized by Spjut are the same. The morphological and chemical variation classified by Spjut was indicated to be due to “plasticity” by Bowler and Marsh, where as Spjut suggested biogeographical relationships that correspond to the biogeographical divisions of the Baja California deserts and the California Floristic Province, generally recognized for higher plants. Although Spjut recognized 42 species in Niebla, this may be a conservative view. There could be hundreds of species in Niebla.
