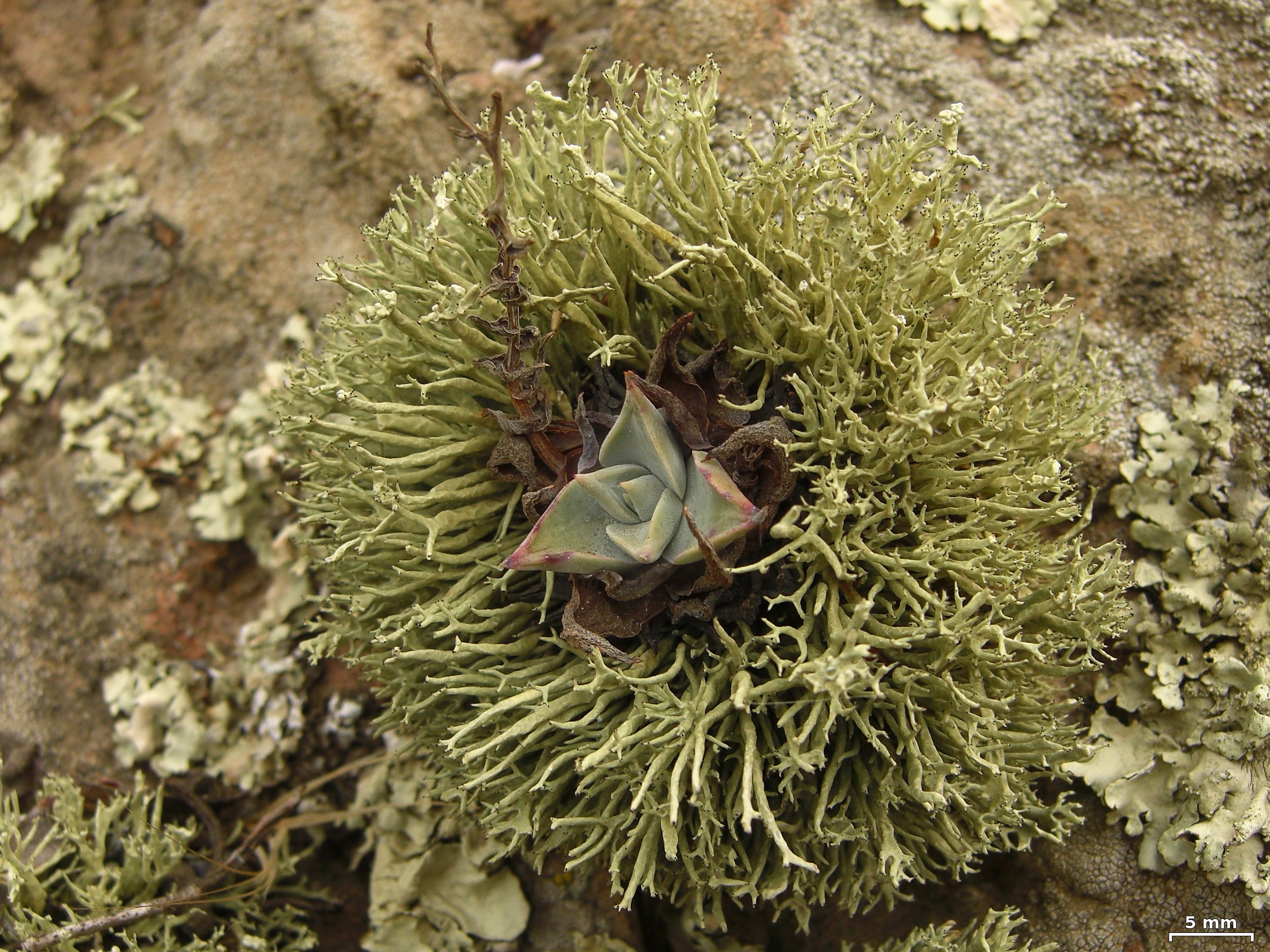

Scientific classification
- Domain: Eukaryota
- Kingdom: Fungi
- Division: Ascomycota
- Class: Lecanoromycetes
- Order: Lecanorales
- Family: Ramalinaceae
- Genus: Vermilacinia
- Species: V. ceruchoides

Binomial name
- Vermilacinia ceruchoides (Rundel & Bowler) Spjut (1996)

Synonyms
- Niebla ceruchoides Rundel & Bowler (1994)

= Vermilacinia ceruchoides =

Species of lichen

Vermilacinia ceruchoides is a fruticose lichen found on rock faces of cliffs or boulders, sometimes growing among mosses, usually near the ocean, ranging in distribution from Marin County, California to San Vicente on the northern peninsula of Baja California, and in the Channel Islands.

== General features ==
The species is recognized by a thallus round in outline divided into filiform branches tightly compacted together, each branch generally round in cross section (terete), 0.1 to 0.7 mm in diameter, and shortly bifurcate near apex, and tipped with a black dot (sterile pycnidia). The thallus lacks a well-defined basal attachment such as a holdfast and is blackened where attached to substrate across a broad area. The overall appearance of the thallus is much like that of the reindeer lichen, Cladonia rangiferina. Lichen substances usually present are bourgeanic acid, unknown (T3), zeorin, and (-)-16 α-hydroxykaurane, with or without usnic acid and salazinic acid.

== Taxonomic history ==
Vermilacinia ceruchoides was described by Phillip Rundel and Peter Bowler in 1994 in the genus Niebla, based on a type collected by R. E. Riefner, Jr. (exposed outcrops along W. Portero road near Lewis Road, about 5 km from the ocean, Reifner 89-588, ASU), presumably in 1989 according to his collection number style (also date of collection questioned n Harvard University Herbaria database); however, it had been previously described by Richard Spjut in a manuscript under another name, V. pulvinata, dating from 1986, that was in press at the time Rundel and Bowler’s name was published. Spjut first collected the species on 30 April 1985 on a rock outcrop along a beach in northern Baja California near Cerro Solo as a voucher specimen (Spjut & Marin 9045, US) for a sample weighing 175 grams (WBA-113) for anti-HIV screening being conducted by the National Cancer Institute.

Richard Spjut was able to change his manuscript name before publication; however, lichen specimens curated by Charis Bratt—now at The Santa Barbara Botanic Garden—that were on loan to the Smithsonian Institution—had not been changed upon return to her; they had remained annotated by the unpublished name. Spjut also had adopted the epithet 'ceruchoides' for a species of Vermilacinia distinguished by having isidia or isidia-like branch segments; he designated a type that had been collected on San Clemente Island by Rolf Santesson, published under the name V. acicularis. Spjut recognized two species, whereas Rundel or Bowler recognized only one.

Prior to Rundel and Bowler’s description of the species, the epithet 'ceruchoides' apparently had been applied by Rolf Santesson to a specimen he had collected from Chile in 1940 (“RSant 2660”, “R(amalina) ceruchoides”) as noted in a report on lichen substances. This specimen, which may be Vermilacinia ceruchis or V. tigrina, was not studied by Spjut. The epithet had also been applied in later publications to specimens in California without a valid description and proper citation according to the International Code of Botanical Nomenclature, regarded as a nomen nudum.

Vermilacinia ceruchoides was also reported by Rundel and Bowler to occur on Guadalupe Island based on a specimen collected by William Weber and C. J. McCoy (L-36641). The morphology falls outside the circumscription of the species as given by Rundel and Bowler. The basal branches are undivided or unequally parted once, short and stubby, more than 1–2 mm in diameter, and inflated above middle to a bluntly rounded apex; the whole thallus similar to V. robusta but smaller. This specimen is the type for Vermilacinia pumila, a species recognized to occur also in California, including the Channel Islands. In 2004, Peter Bowler and Janet Marsh included V. pumila as a synonym of Niebla ceruchoides, but did not emend the original circumscription, nor did they give any scientific data or explanation as to why it should be included in synonymy.

Vermilacinia ceruchoides has also been reported on the northern end of Cedros Island, but the specimens cited were not studied by Spjut.

Vermilacinia tuberculata is most similar to V. ceruchoides, the latter distinguished by its larger size in diameter of branches, greater than 1 mm.
