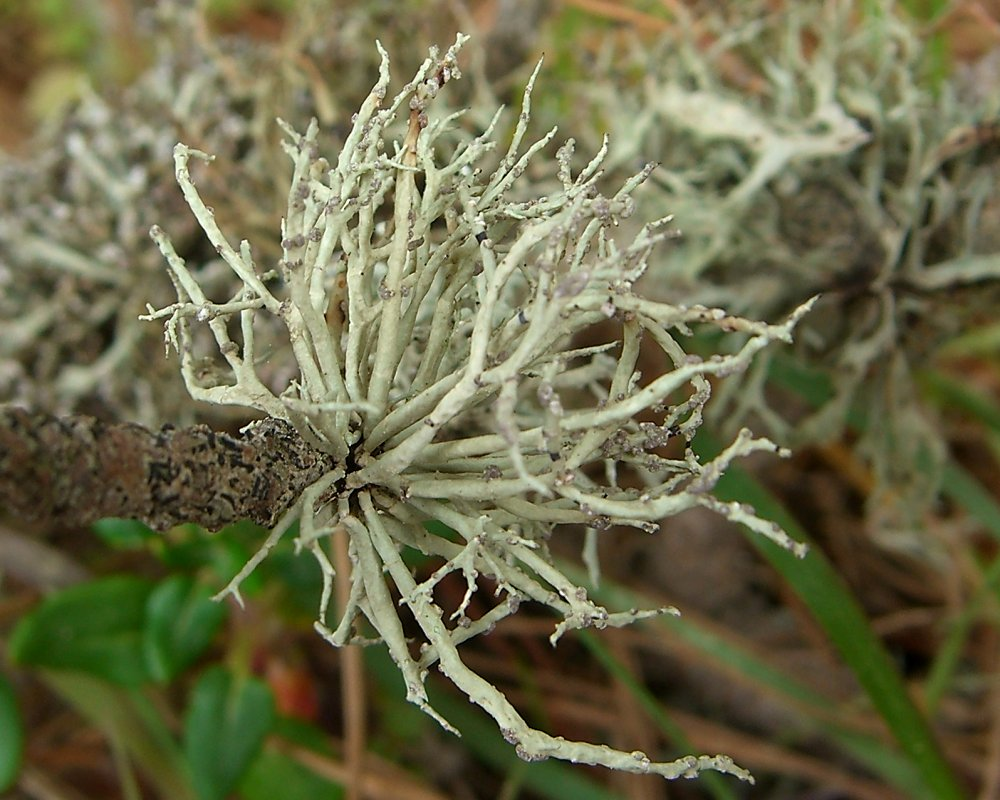

Scientific classification
- Domain: Eukaryota
- Kingdom: Fungi
- Division: Ascomycota
- Class: Lecanoromycetes
- Order: Lecanorales
- Family: Ramalinaceae
- Genus: Vermilacinia
- Species: V. cephalota

Binomial name
- Vermilacinia cephalota (Tuck.) Spjut & Hale (1995)

Synonyms
- Ramalina ceruchis f. cephalota Tuck. (1882); Niebla cephalota (Tuck.) Rundel & Bowler (1978)

= Vermilacinia cephalota =

Species of lichen

Vermilacinia cephalota is a fruticose lichen usually found on trees, shrubs and wooden fences in the fog regions along the Pacific Coast of North America from southeastern Alaska to the Vizcaíno Peninsula of Baja California.

== Distinguishing features ==
Vermilacinia cephalota is classified in the subgenus Cylindricaria in which it is distinguished from related species by the thallus divided into tubular inflated or somewhat compressed fan-shaped branches that arise from a central point of attachment and produce soredia, powdery masses of green alga and white fungal cells that erupt through the cortex, which in V. cephalota form pincushion-like heads (capitate) called soralia (soralium singular) because of their regular shape. The cortex is relatively thin, 10–60 μm thick, and the soralia often have a bluish tint.

Additionally, the cortex of a specimen of Vermilacinia cephalota—that is kept in a herbarium—gradually deteriorates, cracking irregularly; the hyphae and crystalline deposits within the medulla then seem to flow out through the cracks like a stuffed animal toy losing its cotton after being torn. This chemical change or efflorescence of the dried thallus eventually makes it difficult to distinguish the original shape of a soralium. This has been attributed to the diterpene (-)-16 α-hydroxykaurane that occurs in most species of Vermilacinia, and may also be related to an unidentified compound, referred to as T3 (based on its Rf position on a thin-layer chromatography plate), and an aliphatic depside, bourgeanic acid.

Vermilacinia cephalota has a four chemotypes, three of which can be viewed as a chemosyndrome involving (1) salazinic acid in one type, (2) norstictic acid in another type or (3) neither salazinic acid or norstictic acid present. Zeorin and (-)-16 α-hydroxykaurane are the major compounds that are always present. A fourth chemotype includes the presence or absence of the T3 compound.

== Taxonomic history ==
Vermilacinia cephalota was first recognized as Ramalina ceruchis f. cephalota by Edward Tuckerman in 1882 as an “inferior form” of the species that grew upon “dead wood” based upon a specimen collected by “D. Anderson” at Santa Cruz, California (type specimen shown in a revision of the genus). Tuckerman earlier had reported Ramalina ceruchis to occur in North America on trees on Alcatraz Island and near San Diego (California) Tuckerman also included Ramalina combeoides described by William Nylander in 1870 (= Vermilacinia combeoides) under R. ceruchis. His reason for including R. combeoides under R. ceruchis: it “is inseparable from South American forms (‘Terra del Fuego’, Wilkes exp.)." Vermilacinia ceruchis (synonyms, Ramalina ceruchis, Niebla ceruchis), however, occurs only in South America.

Tuckerman distinguished Ramalina ceruchis and R. homalea from other species of Ramalina as having “medullary cords free of the cortical layer, and at length axial; or indistinct” and having “spermogones black” (black pycnidia). This was in contrast to “medullary cords uniting mostly with the cortical layer;” “spermogones commonly pale.” The former was recognized by Phillip Rundel and Peter Bowler in 1978 as belonging to the genus Niebla that included species from Macaronesia that also had “medullary cords free from the cortex. This was preceded by the names having been placed under the illegitimate genus name Desmazieria.

Tuckerman had further described the “cords” of Ramalina homalea “dispersed rather through the cottony medullary, in contrast to R. ceruchis “collected into something like an axial column, within the cottony portion.” The latter was described by Richard Spjut as “freely branched hyphae” in “scattered fascicles separated by single crisscrossing stands” corresponding to subgenus Cylindricaria. Rundel and Bowler had indicated that “chondroid strands are not present in the medulla of some species aggregates” and “does not warrant further generic separation.” These species aggregates included the N. combeoides aggregate and the N. ceruchis aggregate." These aggregates were collectively treated by Spjut in the genus Vermilacinia based on further differences in the lichen substances, depsides or depsidones as major constituents (Niebla) vs. terpenes as major constituents (Vermilacinia).

Spjut recognized three sorediate species in subgenus Cylindricaria, V. cephalota, V. leonis, and V. zebrina. Peter Bowler and Janet Marsh listed V. cephalota as a synonym of Niebla cephalota, but V. leonis and V. zebrina were listed as synonyms of N. ceruchis even though N. ceruchis was indicated by them to lack soredia. Rundel, and Bowler including coauthor Thomas Mulroy in 1972 had stated that “at least two morphologically distinct sorediate Desmazierias have been included within D. cephalota.”

Vermilacinia zebrina, which often has a yellowish green thallus, frequently occurs with V. cephalota in California. It differs by the branches appearing slender throughout, usually with regular occurring black spots or bands, and usually without depsidones. Vermilacinia leonis, which has a flaccid thallus much like cooked spaghetti, is found mainly south of the Vizcaíno Peninsula in Baja California, and also reported to occur in Chile. Two other sorediate species, described in the genus Niebla, one of which is similar to some forms of V. cephalota, was distinguished by dot-like (“punctiform”) soralia that develop on terminal acicular branchlets; another has a flattened thallus similar to Ramalina lacera, but referred to Niebla by the presence of the depside methyl 3,5 dichlorolecanorate; however, it reportedly lacks pycnidia, which is found in all other species of Vermilacinia.
