= Vermilacinia cerebra =

Scientific classification
- Domain: Eukaryota
- Kingdom: Fungi
- Division: Ascomycota
- Class: Lecanoromycetes
- Order: Lecanorales
- Family: Ramalinaceae
- Genus: Vermilacinia
- Species: V. cerebra

Binomial name
- Vermilacinia cerebra Spjut (1996)

Species of lichen

Vermilacinia cerebra is a fruticose lichen that grows on trees and shrubs in the fog regions along the Pacific Coast of North America from the Channel Islands and mainland California near Los Angeles to southern Baja California, also occurring in South America in the Antofagasta Province of northern Chile. The epithet is in reference to the apical swollen lobes that resemble the cerebrum of the brain.

== Distinguishing Features ==
Vermilacinia cerebra is classified in the subgenus Cylindricaria in which it is distinguished from related species by the thallus divided into tubular inflated or somewhat compressed fan-shaped branches. The apical swollen lobes resemble soralia (soredia). The species appears transitional between V. cephalota, which produces soredia, and V. leoparidina which develops subterminal apothecia, and lacks depsidone lichen substances.

Vermilacinia cerebra is also distinct for the longitudinally 3–5 ribbed branches. These features are evident in a 2012 image of the thallus from Palos Verdes Bluffs, possibly near the northernmost range of the species on the California mainland. A specimen cited from that location was collected by Hermann Edward Hasse in 1908; the species still growing there 104 years later.

The lichen substances in Vermilacinia cerebra show a chemo syndrone variation. These include either (1) salazinic acid, (2) norstictic acid, or (3) unknowns without salazinic acid or norstictic acid. Zeorin and (-)-16 α-hydroxykaurane are the major lichen substances that are always present along with bourgeanic acid and an unknown compound referred to as T3 by its relative position on a thin-layer chromatography plate.

== Taxonomic History ==
Vermilacinia cerebra was described in 1996. Some authors include the species under a very broad species and genus concept; essentially, all species of Vermilacinia that grow on trees and shrubs, including two sorediate species, were treated as belonging to Niebla ceruchis, an epithet that is based on a type specimen for a species interpreted to grow on earth in South America, known as Vermilacinia ceruchis. The genus Vermilacinia is distinguished from Niebla by the absence of chondroid strands, and by major lichen substance predominantly of terpenes.
