= Vermilacinia cedrosensis =

Scientific classification
- Domain: Eukaryota
- Kingdom: Fungi
- Division: Ascomycota
- Class: Lecanoromycetes
- Order: Lecanorales
- Family: Ramalinaceae
- Genus: Vermilacinia
- Species: V. cedrosensis

Binomial name
- Vermilacinia cedrosensis (J.E.Marsh & T.H.Nash) Spjut (1996)

Synonyms
- Niebla cedrosensis J.E.Marsh & T.H.Nash (1994)

Species of lichen

Vermilacinia cedrosensis is a species of pale fruticose lichen that is endemic to Baja California, Mexico.

== Description ==
Vermilacinia cedrosensis is a pale fruticose lichen endemic to Baja California, Mexico, occurring on Cedros Island, the Vizcaíno Peninsula, and north along the main peninsula of the northern Baja California coast mountains to near Punta San Carlos. The species is usually found inland from the immediate coastal environment in wind-sheltered microenvironments, which may be leeward sides of small stones or rock ledges on vertical rock walls in narrow arroyos

Vermilacinia cedrosensis is classified in subgenus Vermilacinia in which it is distinguished by its whitish to pale yellowish green thallus divided into flexuous tubular-prismatic branches arising from a holdfast. The primary branches, generally less than 20 in number, and although usually curved, grow up to 6 cm in length and from 5 to 15 mm in width. They occasionally divide into equal secondary branches, usually well above the thallus base. Occasionally near apex are clusters of cupular apothecia, or rarely many short branches spreading radially.

The cortex is generally thinner than in the other species of the subgenus,(0–25 μm thick), especially thinning towards apex as seen by the exposed medulla, which adds white color to the branches, and is also generally creased and shallowly depressed. Pycnidia commonly appear as colorless pits in the cortex of upper half of branches, often with black pycnidia that develop to branch apices. Lichen substances are primarily three terpenes characteristic of the subgenus Vermilacinia, an unknown referred to as "T3", bourgeanic acid, the diterpene (-)-16 α-hydroxykaurane, and the triterpene zeorin. Accessory lichen substances are often present, which may include any or all of the following: salazinic acid, an unknown terpenoid compound (“T4”) and usnic acid.

== Taxonomic history ==
Vermilacinia cedrosensis appears to have been first collected by Joseph Nelson Rose on Cedros Island during the Albatross Expedition, 10–12 March 1911. His lichen specimens had been kept separate from the mounted and filed lichen collections in the herbarium at the Smithsonian Institution, Department of Botany, US) loose in brown standard herbarium paper, and were made available to Richard Spjut sometime after 1986 while he was undertaking a revision of the genus Niebla. The species had already been collected by Richard Spjut about 40 miles north of Guerrero Negro in a narrow canyon of coastal mountains in May 1985 as part of a systematic collection of lichens for anti-tumor and HIV screening being conducted by the National Cancer Institute (NCI). In a collection of a 120 gram sample, (Spjut & Marin 9069, US) he distinguished the species from a similar species, V. paleoderma (Spjut & Marin 9074, US) by its limp branches, lying on the surface of rock ledges rather than growing erect as seen in V. paleoderma. In 1986, Spjut assigned the epithet name albicans—in regard to the thallus color—to the specimen he collected in an initial draft of a manuscript on the genus Niebla reviewed by the lichen curator, Mason E. Hale, Jr. He collected the species again in May 1986 in the Sierra Hornitos (Spjut 1996, Plate 3A, see also Plate 10C) on the Vizcaíno Peninsula (Spjut, Marin & McCloud 9689A, US), and on Cedros Island in April 1989 (Spjut & Marin 10544, US) in regard to a proposed lichen flora of Baja California, superseded by the ‘Lichen Flora of the Greater Sonoran Desert’ headed by Thomas Nash III, first volume published in 2002; the species named Niebla cedrosensis and described by Janet Marsh (with Thomas Nash III) in 1994 based on their collection of the species on Cedros Island earlier that same year, March 12, 1994. It was transferred to the genus "Vermilacinia" in 1996, and returned to the genus Niebla in 2004.

== Taxonomic relationships of Vermilacinia cedrosensis in Ramalinaceae ==
Subgenus Vermilacinia differs from Niebla by the absence of chondroid strands, and by lichen substance predominantly of terpenes; subgenus Vermilacinia commonly has “T3”, (-)-16 α-hydroxykaurane, and zeorin. However, Peter Bowler and Janet Mash did not accept the presence of “chondroid strands” as a character attribute for separating genera of North American Ramalinaceae; only those in the Macaronesian and Mediterranean regions were distinguished from Ramalina by having chondroid strands unattached to the cortex, a distinction they reinforced by new name combinations made in Niebla for Macaronesian and Mediterranean species previously in Ramalina. These Ramalinas had been classified as the “bourgaeana type”. Macaronesian species generally have a reverse chemistry type to that seen in Niebla; for example, triterpenes occur with depsidones, instead of depsides). The chemotypes of Macaronesian Ramalinas also seem related to the genus Vermilacinia, especially in regard to the chemosyndrome seen in V. tigrina, except zeorin is not mentioned for the Macaronesian species. In the Sonoran Desert lichen flora, the presence of (-)-16 α-hydroxykaurane is mentioned as key character for distinguishing Vermilacinia (as Niebla) from Ramalina. Additionally, R. Heber Howe had indicated the presence of chondroid strands was almost of generic importance, and perhaps would have distinguished what is now called Vermilacinia if thin-layer chromatography had been available to him during his time.
