= Vermilacinia pumila =

Scientific classification
- Domain: Eukaryota
- Kingdom: Fungi
- Division: Ascomycota
- Class: Lecanoromycetes
- Order: Lecanorales
- Family: Ramalinaceae
- Genus: Vermilacinia
- Species: V. pumila

Binomial name
- Vermilacinia pumila Spjut (1996)

Species of lichen

Vermilacinia pumila is a whitish-green fruticose lichen that occurs in fog areas along the Pacific Coast and offshore islands of North America. The species epithet pumila refers to the dwarf form of the thallus, in contrast to V. combeoides.

== Distinguishing features ==
Vermilacinia pumila is classified in the subgenus Vermilacina in which it is distinguished by its small hemispherical thallus of densely compacted, erect but curved stubby branches (crowded together, touching) not more than 1 cm high, and generally 1–2 mm in diameter. This is in contrast to the taller and narrower, loosely aggregate branches (not touching) of V. combeoides, 2–4 cm high, and not more than 1 mm in diameter. The branches of V. pumila are slightly inflated above the mid region, which seems related to its thinner cortex, about 50 μm thick, in contrast to the more or less uniform branch diameter of V. combeoides which has a cortex two and one-half to four times as thick (125–200 μm). Vermilacinia pumila seldom produces the terminal apothecia that is generally characteristic of V. combeoides; instead, its branches frequently bifurcate into narrower lobes that abruptly taper to a pointed apex. Both species have most of the same lichens substances but notably differ in their chemotype profiles. The lichen substances include unknown terpenes referred to as T3, T4 and T5, bougeanic acid, zeorin and (-)-16 α-hydroxykaurane with salazinic acid occasionally present. The unknown T4 compound, found only in some species of subgenus Vermilacinia, was present in all specimens of V. pumila studied, in contrast to not always present in V. combeoides. Zeorin was often absent in V. combeoides but always present in V. pumila. The T5 compound was found only in V. combeoides.

Vermilacinia pumila appears intermediate between V. combeoides and V. robusta by its slightly inflated branches, which in V. robusta are of similar length to V. combeoides, but usually more inflated, from 1–6 mm in diameter, with a cortex about 100–120 μm thick.

Vermilacinia pumila was recognized to occur in southern California, including the Channel Islands, to just south of Tijuana in Baja California, and also on Guadalupe Island; however, its range appears to extend north to Point Lobos State Park in Monterrey County, and the thalli there may include apothecia.

== Taxonomic History ==
Vermilacinia pumila was described in 1996. Prior to then, it was seen as variation of V. combeoides; however, Peter Bowler and collaborators had identified the type specimen of V. pumila (before the species was described, collected by William Weber and C. J. McCoy, L-36641) from Guadalupe Island, and one other from Santa Cruz Island (collected by Rudolf M. Schuster) as belonging to Niebla ceruchoides (= Vermilacinia ceruchoides), which led to its treatment as a synonym in the Lichen Flora of the Greater Sonoran Desert. Vermilacinia ceruchoides differs in having a more intricately branched thallus with branches not more than 0.7 mm wide. The genus Vermilacinia differs from Niebla in the absence of chondroid strands, by the lack of cortical ridges that define branch margins, and by producing terpenes and bourgeanic acid not found in Niebla
