= Vermilacinia johncassadyi =

Scientific classification
- Domain: Eukaryota
- Kingdom: Fungi
- Division: Ascomycota
- Class: Lecanoromycetes
- Order: Lecanorales
- Family: Ramalinaceae
- Genus: Vermilacinia
- Species: V. johncassadyi

Binomial name
- Vermilacinia johncassadyi Spjut (1996)

Species of lichen

Vermilacinia johncasadyi is a rare fruticose lichen, found on rocks along the Pacific Coast of Baja California peninsula on Punta Cono, and directly westward across the ocean on Cedros Island.

== Distinguishing features ==
Vermilacinia johncassadyi is classified in the subgenus Vermilacinia, distinguished from related species by its thallus divided into strap-like branches arising from a blackened base to about ¼ the way up the branches, and by producing lichen substances of triterpenes referred to as T1 and T2 in reference to their Rf class on thin-layer chromatography plates. Apothecia, which develop in some thalli, occur in terminal clusters, sometimes extending down along the branch margins. The strap-like branches are recurved in forms that produce apothecia, and erect in forms lacking apothecia.

Vermilacinia laevigata is morphologically similar to V. johncassadyi in its strap-like branches. It differs in its lichen substances (contains T3, not T1 and T2), and development of its apothecia elevated from the branch by a short narrower stalk-like lobe, in contrast to apothecia in V. johncassadyi that appear to pinch off from the branch margins, occurring in aggregate and often not fully developed, the margins notably wavy as a result.

The species was named after a chemist, John Cassady, who was Chairman of the Department of Medicinal Chemistry and Pharmacognosy at Purdue University, and later Dean of the School of Pharmacy at Ohio State University while the species was under investigation. He, and his graduate student, Thomas McCloud, had accompanied Richard Spjut on an expedition to Baja California during May 1986 for the collection of plant and lichen samples in search of new chemical compounds for treating cancer.

== Lichen substances ==
Vermilacinia johncasadyi contains predominantly terpenes but lacks the T3 compound as noted above, and also lacks accessory depsidones such as salazinic acid. It is one of a small number of species in the genus with a distinctive chemistry of secondary triterpenes referred to as T1 and T2. These triterpenes are found only in subgenus Vermilacinia, and only in species that occur in the central region of Baja California. Their chemical formulas were identified by mass spectrometry, C_{30}H_{50}O2 (T1) and C_{30}H_{50}OO (T2) from extraction of 350 grams of a 400 gram sample of Vermilacinia cedrosensis. Some material of V. reptilioderma was in the sample. In thin-layer chromatography (TLC), these compounds are so prominent that they appear to displace zeorin and [16R,(-)]-16 α-hydroxykaurane, appearing as a smear up the TLC plate.

== Taxonomic history ==
Vermilacinia johncasadyi was first discovered along the northwest coast of Cedros Island on vertical rock faces about 500 feet directly above the ocean, 12 April 1989, and described as a new species in 1996 (Spjut & Marin 10535, holotype US)

Peter Bowler and Janet Marsh in 2004 indicated that Vermilacinia johncasadyi was an "aberrant insular" form of Vermilacinia laevigata (synonym Niebla laevigata) They further implied that V. johncassadyi has the same lichen substances as V. laevigata in making reference to the triterpene T3. They did not mention the triterpenes T1 and T2. The species have different geographical ranges, V. johncassayi found only in Vizcaíno Desert, in the central region of Baja California, whereas V. laevigata is confined to the California Floristic Province. Their distinctive morphologies and chemistry thus have significance from a phytogeography view. No explanation was given by Bowler and Marsh as to why V. johncassadyi was deemed synonymous with V. laevigata (“Niebla laevigata”). Although the names N. laevigata and V. laevigata are synonymous, the interpretation of the morphology as belonging to the same genus differs substantially; thus, one might expect that the inclusion of other species (V. johncassadyi) by Bowler and Marsh under “Niebla laevigata” require justification other than just listing them in synonymy. Species names based on different types representing different interpretations are not equal as sometimes seen on web pages, especially since the Bowler and Marsh circumscription of the species was incomplete by not mentioning the unusual lichen substances T1 and T2 that were found in V. johncassadyi.
