= Niebla infundibula =

Scientific classification
- Kingdom: Fungi
- Division: Ascomycota
- Class: Lecanoromycetes
- Order: Lecanorales
- Family: Ramalinaceae
- Genus: Niebla
- Species: N. infundibula

Binomial name
- Niebla infundibula Spjut (1996)

Species of lichen

Niebla infundibula is a fruticose lichen that grows on rocks along the Pacific Coast in the Channel Islands of California (San Nicolas Island) and in Baja California on Guadalupe Island, and on the main peninsula in the southern region of the Northern Vizcaíno Desert on a ridge south of Punta Negra. The epithet, infundibula, is in reference to the funnel shape of the thallus branches.

== Distinguishing features ==
Niebla infundibula is characterized by a large massive rigid thallus divided into sub[terete] branches spreading from a holdfast, to 10 cm high and 15 cm across above the base, and further recognized by containing divaricatic acid and by the large pycnidia. that are prominent on the upper parts of branches, appearing larger than other species in the genus; however, comparative measurements were not provided for all species. The cortex is glossy and moderately thick, 75–125 μm thick. The relatively greater mass of the thallus may be due to a thicker glossy layer that is generally absent in many related species (“epicortex”). Similar species are Niebla juncosa, which differs in having a more fragile thallus with branches that break off as evident from the thallus falling apart in the herbarium, including breaking apart at the base, and by its less glossy cortex and less conspicuous pyncidia (due to their smaller size), and Niebla eburnea, also with smaller pycnidia (200–350 μm long), but generally recognized by its pastry-like, or ivory-like, cortex.

== Taxonomic history ==
Niebla infundibula was first recognized by Richard Spjut, accompanied by Richard Marin and Thomas McCloud, 19 May 1986, just south of Punta Negra on rock outcrops along a ridge that appeared to receive more precipitation from ocean fog than nearby ridges and peaks (Plate 1D in Spjut’s 1996 revision of Niebla and Vermilacinia). This area was observed during May 1985 by Spjut—while he and Marin were collecting samples of lichens in search of new drugs to treat HIV—to have fog lingering over the peaks and ridges most of the day. The following year, in May 1986, they were able to find a path to the foggy ridges and peaks. In addition to Niebla infundibula, other rare species of lichens were discovered, Niebla homaleoides (acid deficient) and Vermilacinia rigida. Niebla infundibula was subsequently found on another ridge just south of Punta Negra, above Punta Rocosa, in March 1988. A strong similarity of N. infundibula to other Niebla species growing with it, such as Niebla josecuervoi (salazinic acid) and Niebla homaleoides, has been suggested to be due to hybridization. The prominence of the pycnidia and their potential role in sexual reproduction has been considered. Specimens later studied in the United States National Herbarium (Smithsonian Institution) and on loan from the University of Colorado and Boulder were also recognized to belong to N. infundibula. However, the species (N. infundibula) appears to be relatively rare based on the relatively few collections reported.

Niebla infundibula has been included under a very broad species concept of Niebla homalea; one that essentially recognizes only three species in the genus Niebla, defined by a two-layered cortex, isolated chondroid strands in the medulla and by lacking key lichen substances such as the triterpene zeorin and the diterpene (-)-16 α-hydroxykaurane that are found in most species of Vermilacinia. Under the broad species concept, the morphological differences are seen as environmentally induced variation, and the chemical differences as chemo-syndromes; however, no data were presented to support this view, other than reference to studies in other genera in which the species differences mentioned were not applicable.
