= Vermilacinia corrugata =

Scientific classification
- Kingdom: Fungi
- Division: Ascomycota
- Class: Lecanoromycetes
- Order: Lecanorales
- Family: Ramalinaceae
- Genus: Vermilacinia
- Species: V. corrugata

Binomial name
- Vermilacinia corrugata Spjut (1996)

Species of lichen

Vermilacinia corrugata is a fruticose lichen that grows on trees and shrubs in the fog regions along the Pacific Coast of North America from the Channel Islands and San Diego in California to southern Baja California. The epithet is in reference to the corrugated cortex of the species.

== Distinguishing Features ==
Vermilacinia corrugata is classified in the subgenus Cylindricaria in which it is distinguished from related species by the thallus divided into tubular corrugated branches. The species is also one of two in the genus that lacks the diterpene (-)-16 α-hydroxykaurane, a diagnostic character trait that easily separates the species from most others in the genus. The triterpene zeorin is usually present, while other lichen substances are rarely evident except for usnic acid, which is generally present in all species of Vermilacinia. Occasionally, no lichen substances have been detected based on thin-layer chromatography. Mature apothecia are usually present, in contrast to rarely being fully developed in V. cerebra.

Vermilacinia corrugata is one of the most common fruticose lichens in Baja California, occurring along the boundary of the fog zone, in contrast to V. leopardina, a more common species found closer to the ocean, distinguished by the presence of black bands and possessing the diterpene (-)-16 α-hydroxykaurane.

== Taxonomic History ==
Vermilacinia corrugata was described in 1996. It had earlier been recognized to intergrade with V. leopardina, based on an older name, Desmazieria ceruchis; however, as noted above, the presence vs. absence of the diterpenes distinguishes the species. Nevertheless, some authors—who feel that lichen chemistry has less taxonomic value—include the species under a very broad species and genus concept; essentially, all species of Vermilacinia that grow on trees and shrubs, including two sorediate species, have been referred to Niebla ceruchis, an epithet that is based on a type specimen for a species interpreted to grow on earth in South America, known as Vermilacinia ceruchis. The genus Vermilacinia is distinguished from Niebla by the absence of chondroid strands, and by the major lichen substance predominantly of terpenes.
