= Vermilacinia leopardina =

Scientific classification
- Kingdom: Fungi
- Division: Ascomycota
- Class: Lecanoromycetes
- Order: Lecanorales
- Family: Ramalinaceae
- Genus: Vermilacinia
- Species: V. leopardina

Binomial name
- Vermilacinia leopardina Spjut (1996)

Species of lichen

Vermilacinia leopardina is a fruticose lichen usually that grows abundantly on the branches of shrubs in the fog regions along the Pacific Coast of North America, in the Channel Islands and on the mainland of California from Santa Barbara County south to the Vizcaíno Peninsula of Baja California. The species is also reported to occur in Chile, based on a single specimen mounted on a large index card off to one corner with the type (biology) of Usnea tumidula (variant of V. ceruchis) in the center and bottom (plate 45.2 in Spjut 1996); it is possible that the specimen of V. leopardina was from North America and placed on the card for the purpose of making a comparison to the type for Usnea tumidula, which was annotated Ramalina ceruchis var. gracilior Muell.Arg., a name of uncertain status. The epithet, leopardina, is in reference to the black transverse bands and irregularly shaped black spots commonly seen on the thallus branches that obviously imply a similarity to the leopard animal, while also making comparative distinctions to other black banded species: V. tigrina and V. zebrina, obviously to a tiger and zebra, and to V. leonis, obviously a lion, which has no black stripes.

== Description ==
Vermilacinia leopardina is classified in the subgenus Cylindricaria in which it is distinguished from related species by thallus divided into narrow tubular branches that often bear saucer shaped to slightly cup-shaped apothecia just below the apex; a short spine-like branch often extends from the apothecia. The branches often have irregularly shaped black spots and regularly shaped black transverse bands that appear to constrict the thallus branches where they develop. The bands are thought to be a fasciation of the pycnidia as a result of aborting development. This is contrast to the pycnidia in V. nylanderi that are abundantly produced but hardly conspicuous because they are immersed in the cortex but evident by the bump-like elevated area of the cortical surface; their abundance is conspicuous when the thallus is sectioned and examined under a microscope. Also, pycnidia in V. nylanderi are abundantly fertile; i.e., they produce what appear to be viable conidia (conidium singular), which “are specialized, non-motile fungal spores,” that appear to function as re-establishing the lichen with an “appropriate photobiont,” a form of asexual reproduction, in contrast to “sterile pycnidia (conidia not evident) in V. leopardina. Conidia may also to function as “male gametes (spermatia)” Both species contain lichen substances zeorin and (-)-16-hydroxykaurane without other substances, a T3 compound occasionally present in V. nylanderi., which usually lacks black bands on its branches

Vermilacinia leopardina resembles V. tigrina in the black banded branches when the bands are present in V. tigrina. They differ more by the lichen substances. Vermilacinia tigrina—first described from thalli in South America that grew on soil on Cerro Moreno in the Antofagasta Province of Chile—was distinguished by having the lichen substance psoromic acid, which is a minor constituent to the terpenoid compounds, while it was also distinguished from other related species that produce methyl, 3,5 dichlorolecnorate (tumidulin). Subsequently, the species circumscription of V. tigrina was broadened to include thalli in North America that had additional lichens substances of depsidones—hypoprotocetraric acid, salazinic acid, norstictic acid, or hypoprotocetraric acid—which a thallus may have anyone of the depsidones accessory to the terpenoid compounds zeorin and (-)-16-hydroxykaurane that are constantly present. Vermilacinia leopardina differs in being deficient in depsidones.

Vermilacinia leopardina may appear to intergrade morphologically with V. corrugata; however, the species are easily distinguished by differences in the lichen terpenoid substances. On the northern half of the Baja California peninsula, Vermilacinia leopardina occurs nearer the ocean or where fog lingers more during the day, in contrast to V. corrugata, lacking (-)-16-hydroxykaurane, occurring where there is less moisture from fog, such as near the perimeter of the fog zone.

Vermilacinia leopardina was described in 1996, but also has been perceived to be a synonym (taxonomy) under an extremely broad species and genus concept; one that essentially combines all species of Vermilacinia that grow on trees and shrubs, including two sorediate species, under one species name, Niebla ceruchis, an epithet that is based on a type (biology) specimen for a species interpreted to grow on earth in South America, recognized as Vermilacinia ceruchis, one that is also endemic to South America. The listing of seven different species names under “Niebla ceruchis” that includes V. leopardina, for example as one synonym (biology) of the seven synonyms does not mean that they are equal to N. ceruchis, as sometimes indicated on web sites and in literature, especially when the listing of synonyms provide no scientific basis for reaching such a conclusion, and when the species already had been substantiated as distinct by their differences in morphology, chemistry, ecology, and geography.

The genus Vermilacinia is distinguished from Niebla by the absence of chondroid strands in the medulla, and by the major lichen substance predominantly of terpenes.
