= Vermilacinia rosei =

Scientific classification
- Domain: Eukaryota
- Kingdom: Fungi
- Division: Ascomycota
- Class: Lecanoromycetes
- Order: Lecanorales
- Family: Ramalinaceae
- Genus: Vermilacinia
- Species: V. rosei

Binomial name
- Vermilacinia rosei Spjut (1996)

Species of fungus

Vermilacinia rosei is a fruticose lichen known from two islands off the Pacific Coast of central Baja California, San Roque Island and Cedros Island. The epithet, rosei, is in honor of Joseph Nelson Rose who collected the lichen on San Roque Island, 15 March 1911, during the Albatross Expedition. His lichen specimens had been kept separate from the mounted and filed lichen collections in the herbarium at the Smithsonian Institution, Department of Botany, US) loose in brown standard herbarium paper, and were made available to Richard Spjut sometime after 1986 while he was undertaking a revision of the genus Niebla. The epithet was proposed by Albert William Herre who considered the lichen to be a new species but did not describe the species or publish the name. .

== Distinguishing Features ==
Vermilacinia rosei is classified in the subgenus Vermilacinia in which it is distinguished from related species by its thallus divided into relatively few fan-shaped branches (less than 10)—widely expanded above a short narrow stalk-like base—and by its secondary metabolites of triterpenes, referred to as T1 and T2 by their Rf values on thin-layer chromatography plates; their formulas are C_{30}H_{50}O2 (T1) and C_{30}H_{50}OO (T2). Lichen substances also include the triterpene zeorin and the diterpene (-)-16 α-hydroxykaurane that characterize subgenus Vermilacinia. The broadly expanded branches from base to apex is similar to V. robusta, which differs by lacking the T1, T2 triterpenes, and by having a definite tubular shape to the branches. Vermilacinia varicosa, also from Isla San Roque, appears morphological indistinguishable from V. rosei, differing only in chemistry, lacking the two triterpenes, which appear to have phytogeography significance in the species classification of Vermilacinia. A specimen from Cedros Island referred to this species, collected by Richard Spjut and Richard Marin in April 1990, differs by having a thicker reticulate ridged cortex, 75–110 μm thick, compared to the cortex in the type collection with crater-like depression, 45–65(-75) μm thick.

== Taxonomic History ==
Vermilacinia rosei was described by Richard Spjut in 1996 from study of herbarium specimens at the United States National Herbarium, Smithsonian Institution. Peter Bowler and Janet Marsh in 2004 included V. rosei under their Niebla laevigata (= Vermilacinia laevigata), among five other species of Vermilacinia without explanation. The morphology and chemistry differ conspicuously between the two species. Among the species recognized by Bowler and Marsh, V. rosei appears more similar to V. robusta than to V. laevigata.
