= Vermilacinia leonis =

Scientific classification
- Domain: Eukaryota
- Kingdom: Fungi
- Division: Ascomycota
- Class: Lecanoromycetes
- Order: Lecanorales
- Family: Ramalinaceae
- Genus: Vermilacinia
- Species: V. leonis

Binomial name
- Vermilacinia leonis Spjut (1996)

Species of lichen

Vermilacinia leonis is a fruticose lichen usually found on branches of shrubs in the fog regions along the Pacific Coast of North America and South America; in North America it is found on the southern half of the main peninsula of Baja California north to the southern coast of the Vizcaíno Peninsula. In South America, it occurs on bushes and rocks in Chile; reported from Colchaqua (Valley) and Santiago The epithet is in regard to absence of the black transverse bands often seen in other species such as V. leopardina, V. tigrina and V. zebrina.

== Distinguishing features ==
Vermilacinia leonis is classified in the subgenus Cylindricaria in which it is distinguished from related species by a flaccid to subflaccid thallus divided into numerous narrow cylindrical branches that produce soredia, powdery masses of green alga and white fungal cells that form in pincushion-like heads (capitate), also called soralia because of their regular shape. The soredia erupt through a relatively thin cortex, 10–40 μm thick. The soralia are round in outline, and less than the width of the branch, in contrast to soralia in the related V. cephalota and V. zebrina that have a diameter greater than the width of the branch. The lichen substances include the usual triterpene zeorin and diterpene (-)-16-hydroxykaurane with or without salazinic acid and other unknowns may be present that include a T3 compound that is generally recognized as characteristic of the genus, and probably bourgeanic acid.

Two other sorediate species, described in the genus Niebla, one of which is similar to some forms of V. cephalota, was distinguished by dot-like (“punctiform”) soralia that develop on terminal acicular branchlets; another has a flattened thallus similar to Ramalina lacera, but referred to Niebla by the presence of the depside methyl 3,5 dichlorolecanorate; however, it reportedly lacks pycnidia, generally present in all other species of Vermilacinia but not always in all thalli of a species (e.g., V. zebrina).

== Taxonomic fistory ==
Vermilacinia leonis was described in 1996, but also perceived to be a synonym (taxonomy) under an extremely broad species and genus concept; one that essentially combines all species of Vermilacinia that grow on trees and shrubs, including two sorediate species, under one species name, Niebla ceruchis, an epithet that is based on a type (biology) specimen for a species interpreted to grow on earth in South America, recognized as Vermilacinia ceruchis, one that is also endemic to South America. The listing of seven different species names under “Niebla ceruchis” that includes V. howei, for example as one synonym (biology) of the seven synonyms does not mean that they are equal to N. ceruchis, as sometimes indicated on web sites and in literature, especially when the listing of synonyms provide no scientific basis for reaching such a conclusion, and when the species already had been substantiated as distinct by their differences in morphology, chemistry, ecology, and geography.

The genus Vermilacinia is distinguished from Niebla by the absence of chondroid strands in the medulla, and by the major lichen substance predominantly of terpenes.
