= Vermilacinia nylanderi =

Scientific classification
- Kingdom: Fungi
- Division: Ascomycota
- Class: Lecanoromycetes
- Order: Lecanorales
- Family: Ramalinaceae
- Genus: Vermilacinia
- Species: V. nylanderi

Binomial name
- Vermilacinia nylanderi Spjut (1996)

Species of lichen

Vermilacinia nylanderi is a fruticose lichen that grows on branches of shrubs in the fog regions along the Pacific Coast of North America in the Channel Islands and in Baja California from near El Rosario south to the Vizcaíno Peninsula The epithet honors William Nylander who published a monograph on the related genus Ramalina in 1870.

== Distinguishing Features ==
Vermilacinia nylanderi is classified in the subgenus Cylindricaria in which it is distinguished from related species by the thallus divided into numerous narrow tubular rugose branches, by the abundant fertile pycnidia, and by lichen substances of zeorin and (-)-16-hydroxykaurane, occasionally with unknowns. The species is similar to V. corrugata which lacks (-)-16-hydroxykaurane. Vermilacinia leopardina, which has the same lichen substances, differs in its shiny cortex and sterile pycnidia that appear as irregularly shaped black spots and regularly shaped transverse bands.

Pycnidia in Vermilacinia nylanderi are not always conspicuous, especially in the field, because they are often immersed in the cortex. They are nevertheless evident by the bump-like elevated areas along the cortical surface. Their abundance is conspicuous when the thallus is sectioned and examined under a dissecting microscope. Pycnidia in V. nylanderi are abundantly fertile as seen by conidia (conidium singular), which “are specialized, non-motile fungal spores,” that appear to function as re-establishing the lichen with an “appropriate photobiont,” a form of asexual reproduction, in contrast to “sterile pycnidia (conidia not evident) in V. leopardina. Conidia may also to function as “male gametes (spermatia)”

Vermilacinia nylanderi was first recognized by color changes in the thallus after its collection in the field, initially appearing pinkish on apical lobes, then yellow orange and then gradually turning brown within a few years. The species appears most common on the Vizcaíno Peninsula along the southern coast region. Vermilacinia howei, which is similar to V. leopardina in the irregular black banding on thallus branches, occurs further away from the coast on the Vizcaíno Peninsula. Their morphological-chemical differences appear ecologically the reverse of the relationship between V. leopardina and V. corrugata on the northern peninsula.

== Taxonomic History ==
Vermilacinia nylanderi was described in 1996, but also has been perceived to be a synonym (taxonomy) under an extremely broad species and genus concept; one that essentially combines all species of Vermilacinia that grow on trees and shrubs, including two sorediate species, under one species name, Niebla ceruchis, an epithet that is based on a type (biology) specimen for a species interpreted to grow on earth in South America, recognized as Vermilacinia ceruchis, one that is also endemic to South America. The listing of seven different species names under “Niebla ceruchis” that includes V. nylanderi, for example as one synonym of the seven synonyms does not mean that they are equal to N. ceruchis, as sometimes indicated on web sites and in literature, especially when the listing of synonyms provide no scientific basis for reaching such a conclusion, and when the species already had been substantiated as distinct by their differences in morphology, chemistry, ecology, and geography.

The genus Vermilacinia is distinguished from Niebla by the absence of chondroid strands in the medulla, and by the major lichen substance predominantly of terpenes.
