= Vermilacinia paleoderma =

Scientific classification
- Kingdom: Fungi
- Division: Ascomycota
- Class: Lecanoromycetes
- Order: Lecanorales
- Family: Ramalinaceae
- Genus: Vermilacinia
- Species: V. paleoderma

Binomial name
- Vermilacinia paleoderma Spjut (1996)

Species of lichen

Vermilacinia paleoderma is a pale yellow-green fruticose lichen that occurs commonly along the fog zone of the Pacific Coast of Northern Vizcaíno Desert region of Baja Californica and occasionally in the Chaparral Islands of California.

== Distinguishing features ==
Vermilacinia paleoderma is distinguished by its thallus divided into relatively long tubular-prismatic branches—to 6 cm long in contrast to 4 cm long in V. combeoides—that arise from a common base, the branches generally of longitudinal spiraled cortical ribs with recessed crater-like depression between the ribs; the craters frequently separated by transverse pastry-like creases, which gives the overall prismatic appearance to the branches. Primary branches vary from less than 5 to more than 20, simple or often divided well above base into equal secondary branches, or with many shorter branches developing along one side when the primary branches spread out and curve upwards towards light. Black pycnidia are conspicuous on the branches, giving the thallus the appearance of having the measles except for the black color. Apothecia usually develop terminally on some branches, often in small aggregates. Lichen substances are primarily three terpenoid compounds, T3, zeorin and (-)-16 α-hydroxykaurane; bougeanic acid undoubtedly present; salazinic acid occasionally present.

Vermilacinia paleoderma is perhaps the most common species in the subgenus Vermilacinia on rocks near the immediate coast of the Baja California peninsula, from Punta Canoas south to Miller’s Landing. It occurs sporadically on the Vizcaíno Peninsula and offshore islands, namely Guadalupe Island, Islas San Benito, Isla San Martín (near San Quintín), and in the Channel Islands. It often grows in small tufts with species of Niebla, or in extensive pure colonies on rock outcrops on ridges that receive more fog from ocean wind

== Taxonomic history ==
Although Vermilacinia paleoderma is widely distributed, it had remained unknown until 1996. In 1994, two closely related species were described; Vermilacinia cedrosensis was first distinguished (as Niebla cedrosensis) from thalli growing on Cedros Island by the cylindrical shape of the branches, and recognized to also occur on the Vizcaíno Peninsula at Punta Eugenia, in contrast to Vermilacinia polymorpha (synonym Niebla polymorpha) distinguished by its irregularly dilated branch segments, based on specimens from Santa Catalina Island and nearby California mainland. Both species that were originally described in the genus Niebla in 1994 were transferred to Vermilacinia in 1996, but still recognized as Niebla in a 2004 lichen flora; however, V. paleoderma was placed in synonymy under Niebla laevigata, a species that has mostly flattened branches, in contrast to the diagnostic features of “sublinear branches” given for the species in 1996. Another closely related species, V. reptilioderma, which differs by chemistry in having the tripterpenes, referred to as T1 and T2 by where they form spots on thin-layer chromatography plates, was considered a synonym of Niebla cedrosensis.

The genus Niebla differs in having free chondroid strands in the medulla and by lichen substances primarily of depsides (divaricatic acid or sekikaic acid with accessory triterpenes), and depsidones (salazinic acid or hyprotocetraric acid or protocetraric acid or acid deficient, without accessory triterpenes); the terpenes when present are not the triterpene zeorin and the diterpene (-)-16 α-hydroxykaurane that characterizes the genus Vermilacinia. It was stated by Darrell Wright "that not one of the eight substances found in N. laevigata [= Vermilacinia laevigata] appears to correspond to any of the seven substances in its congener, N. homalea." Additionally, cortical differences were described by Peter Bowler as a "thick outer cortex with palisade cell lines and a subtending layer of supportive tissue," corresponding to the genus Niebla, as well as "a thin cortex of branching hyphae in a matrix with mechanical tissue either absent or sparsely present," corresponding to subgenus Cylindricaria, and a cortex with "a thick mechanical layer and a variable palisade layer," corresponding to subgenus Vermilacinia.
