= N. polymorpha =

N. polymorpha may refer to:

- Neomariopteris polymorpha, an extinct fern
- Niebla polymorpha, a fruticose lichen
