= Vermilacinia polymorpha =

Scientific classification
- Domain: Eukaryota
- Kingdom: Fungi
- Division: Ascomycota
- Class: Lecanoromycetes
- Order: Lecanorales
- Family: Ramalinaceae
- Genus: Vermilacinia
- Species: V. polymorpha

Binomial name
- Vermilacinia polymorpha (Bowler, J.E.Marsh, T.H.Nash & Riefner) Spjut (1996)

Synonyms
- Niebla polymorpha Bowler, J.E.Marsh, T.H.Nash & Riefner (1994)

Species of lichen

Vermilacinia polymorpha is a fruticose lichen infrequently found on Santa Catalina Island in the Channel Islands of California and along the mainland coast in Ventura and Orange counties. It has also been indicated to occur south into northwestern Baja California without reference to specimens to support its range extension, and shown to occur on the Vizcaíno Peninsula in central Baja California on a distribution map in a lichen flora, without reference to specimen data; however, specimen data from other sources indicate it does occur as far south as Punta Santa Rosalillita on the main peninsula of Baja California, and also reported from Guadalupe Island.

== Distinguishing features ==
Vermilacinia polymorpha may be recognized by a thallus divided into partly strap-like branches with irregularly widened parts, somewhat spoon-shaped, as shown in a “representative specimen” in the original publication by Peter Bowler and coauthors reportedly collected by Richard E. Riefner Jr. (87-61a, IRVC) from Aliso Canyon in Orange County, California. The authors had noted that the species “most closely resembles a deformed N. robusta which has smaller spores of 10–12 μm, inflated, rounded branches, and larger urn-shaped apothecia.” Richard Spjut, in his revision of Niebla and Vermilacinia, indicated that V. polymorpha is distinguished by the “oblong branches (less than 10 times longer than wide)”; he commented that some forms were difficult to distinguish from Vermilacinia robusta, while he was only able to briefly glance at the type while visiting Arizona State University in April 1996, and that it is also distinguished by its smaller thallus with irregularly widened branches, compared to Vermilacinia paleoderma.

The type (biology) specimen, which was not shown in the original publication, was reported to have been collected by Janet Marsh on Santa Catalina Island (Marsh 6206, ASU). It differs in having irregularly widened branch parts near thallus base and narrower tubular segments above. The branches in the type specimen appear as long as 3 cm, and described to be up to 6 mm wide where flattened, especially flattened or inflated near base.

== Taxonomic history ==
The species was originally described in the genus Niebla in 1994 and transferred to Vermilacinia in 1996, but retained in Niebla by Peter Bowler and Janet Marsh in a 2004 lichen flora. Vermilacinia differs from Niebla in its chemistry of terpenes., none of which are found in Niebla, in the structure of its cortex", and in its net-like organization of the hyphae in the medulla.

Besides the controversy of whether Niebla polymorpha is a synonym of Vermilacinia polymorpha, the geographical occurrences of the species itself (V. polymorpha) are also subject to interpretation since many specimens were identified by many different authorities as referenced in this article, and that specimens were not always cited to substantiate the range of the species indicated at the time of publication.
