= Vermilacinia reptilioderma =

Scientific classification
- Domain: Eukaryota
- Kingdom: Fungi
- Division: Ascomycota
- Class: Lecanoromycetes
- Order: Lecanorales
- Family: Ramalinaceae
- Genus: Vermilacinia
- Species: V. reptilioderma

Binomial name
- Vermilacinia reptilioderma Spjut (1996)

Species of lichen

Vermilacinia reptilioderma is a rare fruticose lichen found on the Vizcaíno Peninsula and Cedros Island of Baja California. The epithet, reptilioderma, is in regard to the outer surface of the cortex appearing like the skin of a reptile, especially the brown snake, Pseudechis australis, the color of the thallus cortex often turning brown when stored in a herbarium.

== Distinguishing Features ==
Vermilacinia reptilioderma is classified in the subgenus Vermilacinia in which it is distinguished from related species by features of the cortex and secondary metabolites (lichen substances). The thallus is generally divided into slender whip-like cylindrical branches, usually numbering less than 20 that arise from a holdfast. The cortex is conspicuously rugose (with short wavy or sinuous ridges) above the mid region. Lichen substances are triterpenes referred to as T1 and T2, known only from several other species in the subgenus Vermilacinia in the central region of Baja California. Also present are zeorin and (-)-16 α-hydroxykaurane typically found in the genus. The triterpenes T1 and T2 correspond to their Rf values on thin-layer chromatography plates and were determined by mass spectrometry to have a formula of C_{30}H_{50}O2 (T1) and C_{30}H_{50}OO (T2). Salazinic acid, often found in most related species, was not reported.

Pycnidia commonly develop on cortical ridges along margins of branches or on the rim of crater like depressions that commonly form between the branch margins. The occurrence of pycnidia appears associated with the rugose cortical condition. Apothecia occasionally develop terminally on a branch, usually few in number, or often apothecia apparently fail to fully develop, and aggregates of aborted apothecia then form near apex on short narrow lobes off the main branch.

Vermilacinia reptilioderma is similar to V. cedrosensis, with which it often occurs, but differs by its thicker persistent rugose cortex, 45–75 μm thick. Vermilacinia cedrosensis has a pale yellow green cortex, appearing pitted and also white due to the cortex eroding or thinning out (instead of becoming thicker) towards apex, from 0–60 μm thick; the white medulla often exposed; V. cedrosensis also lacks the T1 and T2 compounds. Another similar species, V. paleoderma, generally differs by the rigid branches and cup shaped apothecia as opposed to saucer-shaped apothecia in V. reptilioderma, but the species are probably best distinguished by their lichen metabolites. Vermilacinia paleoderma, like V. cedrosensis, does not have the T1 and T2 triterpenes, which appear to displace the appearance of zeorin and (-)-16 α-hydroxykaurane on thin-layer chromatography plates.

== Taxonomic History ==
Vermilacinia reptilioderma was described in 1996. It was subsequently treated as a synonym of Niebla cedrosensis (= Vermilacinia cedrosensis) in the Lichen Flora of the Greater Sonoran Desert without justification. The genus Vermilacinia differs from Niebla in the absence of chondroid strands, by the lack of cortical ridges that define branch margins, and by producing terpenes and bourgeanic acid not found in Niebla.
