= Vermilacinia granulans =

Scientific classification
- Kingdom: Fungi
- Division: Ascomycota
- Class: Lecanoromycetes
- Order: Lecanorales
- Family: Ramalinaceae
- Genus: Vermilacinia
- Species: V. granulans

Binomial name
- Vermilacinia granulans (Sipman) R.Spjut & Sérus. (2020)

Synonyms
- Niebla granulans Sipman (2011)

Species of lichen-forming fungus

Vermilacinia granulans is a species of fruticose lichen in the family Roccellaceae. Found in coastal Chile, it was formally described as a new species in 2011 by the Dutch lichenologist Harrie Sipman, originally as a member of the genus Niebla. The type specimen was collected by Gerhard Follmann in 1960 in Zapallar, Valparaíso, where it was found growing on twigs. Richard Spjut and Emmanuël Sérusiaux reclassified it in Vermilacinia in 2020.
