= Vermilacinia tuberculata =

Scientific classification
- Domain: Eukaryota
- Kingdom: Fungi
- Division: Ascomycota
- Class: Lecanoromycetes
- Order: Lecanorales
- Family: Ramalinaceae
- Genus: Vermilacinia
- Species: V. tuberculata

Binomial name
- Vermilacinia tuberculata (Riefner, Bowler, Marsh & T.H.Nash) Spjut (1996)

Synonyms
- Niebla tuberculata Riefner, Bowler, J.E.Marsh & T.H.Nash (1995)

Species of lichen

Vermilacinia tuberculata is a fruticose lichen known only from Morro Bay along the Pacific Coast of California The epithet tuberculata is a reference to the tuberculate surface of the lichen.

== Distinguishing features ==
Vermilacinia tuberculata is classified in subgenus Vermilacinia in which it is distinguished by its much-branched thallus to 5 cm tall with a rough cortex due to tiny tubercles that resemble isidia; the branches are 1–5 mm wide and sometimes bear subterminal apothecia.

The species is similar to V. ceruchoides, which differs by narrower branches, less than 1mm in diameter, and by regularly producing terminal bifurcate branchlets, and also to V. acicularis, which differs by lacking a well-defined holdfast.

== Taxonomic history ==
Vermilacinia tuberculata was originally described by Richard E. Riefner Jr., and collaborators in 1995, preceded by its reference in 1994 in a key to Niebla species as "N. sp. nov."

In the original publication on page 198, "chemistry is stated to be usnic acid, unidentified triterpenes (possibly including zeorin)." In the following paragraph Niebla tuberculata was stated to be “characterized by” “a triterpenoid chemistry lacking diterpenes, depsidones, and para or meta-depsides." This distinction was further emphasized in their comparison with Niebla combeoides and Desmazieria ceruchoides ("a nomen nudum that will be redefined later"): "These taxa produce floccose deposits that extrude between cracks in the cortex with age. The mold-like appearance of this deposit has been attributed to the presence of ceruchdiol (Benz et al. 1965), a diterpene that is absent or the concentration too low to be detected by TLC in N. tuberculata”.

The reported absence of the diterpenes led Richard Spjut to conclude that a key difference in V. tuberculata was the absence of the diterpenes; (-)-16 α-hydroxykaurane however, upon preparing to return specimens on loan from the University of Colorado Herbarium at Boulder, he noted two specimens from the type locality that had been determined by him to have (-)-16 α-hydroxykaurane with only trace amounts of zeorin. The authors in the original publication may have confused (-)-16 α-hydroxykaurane with zeorin. A correction by Spjut was noted on World Botanical Associates web page. In 2004, Bowler and Marsh retained the species in Niebla, while also indicating that secondary metabolites were usnic acid and unidentified triterpenes. The triterpene zeorin is frequently absent or in trace amounts in several species in the subgenus Vermilacinia, whereas (-)-16 α-hydroxykaurane is found in all species taking into the correction. The absence of diterpene has been reported in the subgenus Cylindricaria for two species in North America.
