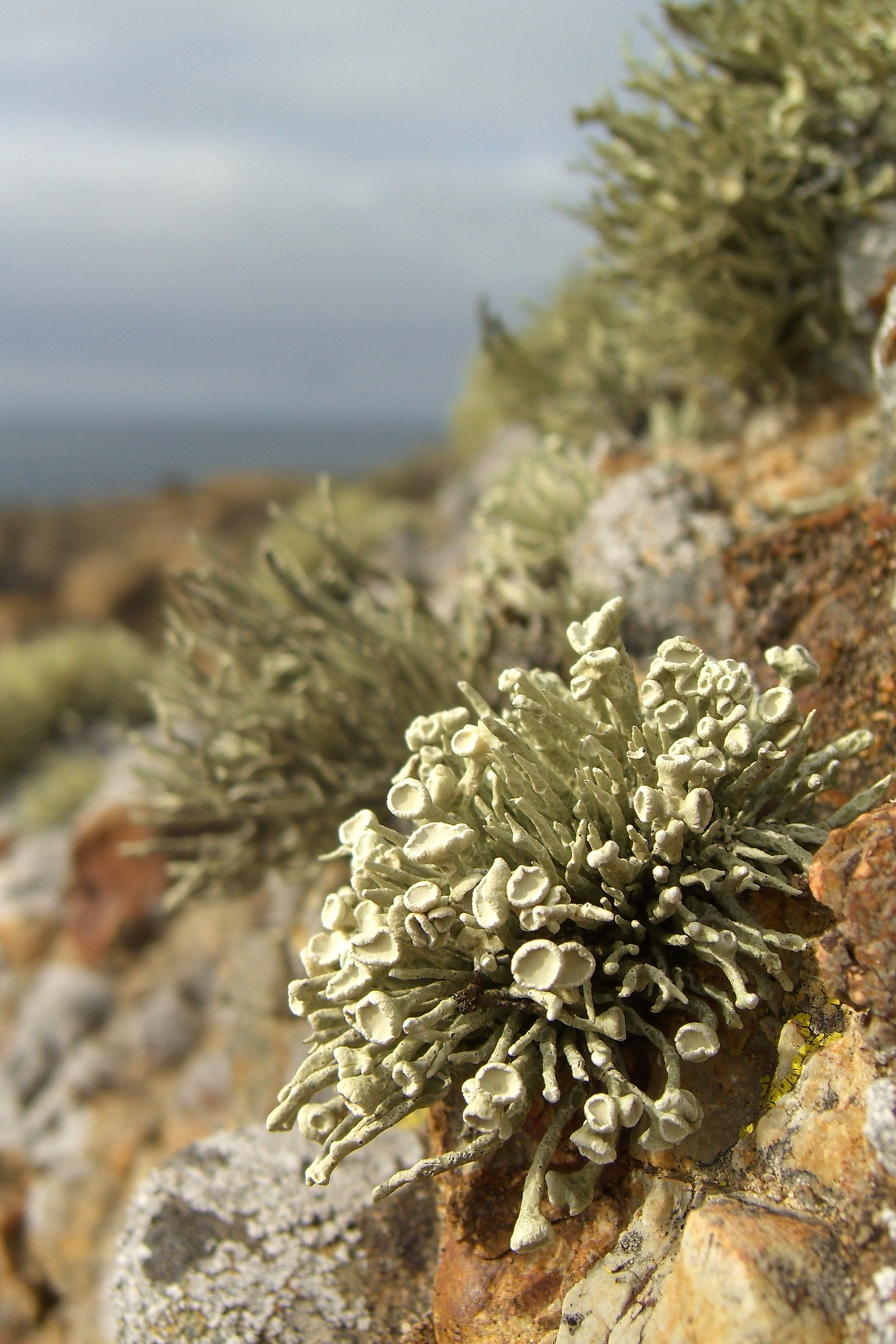
- Vermilacinia combeoides

Scientific classification
- Kingdom: Fungi
- Division: Ascomycota
- Class: Lecanoromycetes
- Order: Lecanorales
- Family: Ramalinaceae
- Genus: Vermilacinia; Spjut & Hale (1995)

Type species
- Vermilacinia combeoides (Nyl.) Spjut & Hale (1995)

= Vermilacinia =

Genus of lichens

Vermilacinia, a genus of lichenized fungi in the family Ramalinaceae, is a yellow-green fruticose type of lichen with about 30 species that grow on rocks, trees, and soil within the fog zone along the Pacific Coast of North America and South America. The genus name refers to the thallus being divided into narrow worm-like (vermis) branches (lacinia);the latter part of the name (lacinia) generally applies in descriptions and taxonomic keys such as exemplified in a key to Sonoran Desert species of Ramalina.

The species of Vermilacinia are classified in two subgenera: subgenus Cylindricaria and subgenus Vermilacinia. Subgenus Cylindricaria, which includes 10+ species (type: Vermilacinia corrugata Spjut) that grow mostly on shrubs, is distinguished by a thin membranous pliable cortex (an outer skin-like layer composed of gelatinized hyphal cells) that expands as the thallus imbibes moisture, usually from fog, and shrinks upon drying (as fog dissipates). Subgenus Vermilacinia, which includes 20 species (type: same as for the genus: Vermilacinia combeoides (Nyl.) Spjut & Hale) that grow on rocks (saxicolous) and soil (terricolous), is distinguished by a relatively thick crusty cortex (like a dry pie crust) overlying a medulla with a rigid lattice of hyphae. The firmer cortex of subgenus Vermilacinia undoubtedly adds support to the thallus that allows its branches to grow upright from the substrate.

Niebla and Ramalina are related genera distinguished by the hyphae forming multiple longitudinal gelatinized cords (chondroid stands), within the medulla. In many species of Ramalina they form a network interconnected with the lower cortex and medulla, in contrast to a uniform lattice or a single central cord in the Vermilacinia medulla. Also, both Niebla and Vermilacinia have been included in Ramalina, which is distinguished by the pale pycnidia, the presence of pseudocyphellae, the absence of the diterpene (−)-16 α-hydroxykaurane, and the absence of the triterpene zeorin in most species.

Vermilacinia is also unique in the Ramalinaceae for producing the diterpene (−)-16 α-hydroxykaurane (common in nonlichen fungi) among other lichen substances, notably zeorin and bourgeanic acid; depsidones are frequently present as accessory substances. The diterpene is found in all species of subgenus Vermilacinia and in most species of subgenus Cylindricaria. Exceptions are two North American species endemic to Baja California that only contain zeorin, or appear deficient in lichen substances, although usnic acid may be present in the cortex (V. corrugata, V. howei).

This diterpene, known also as ceruchdiol or ceruchinol, has been attributed to cause a mildew-like appearance that develops gradually on herbarium specimens. The thallus structure in some specimens collected more than 100 years ago is not discernible, making it difficult to determine whether or not soredia are present, which is necessary for species identification. The mold-like appearance is the result of efflorescence—a chemical change associated with the breakdown of the cortex from which the internal (medulla) hyphae erupt. Efflorescence can be slowed or prevented by storing specimens in a frost-free refrigerator below 40 °F, although there may be a trade-off in that long-term storage causes the cortex to become brittle over time (nine years).

Not all species of Vermilacinia that produce the diterpene exhibit efflorescence. The presence or absence of this condition has also been referred to in the literature as "deposit" and "no deposit". For example, Gerd Bendz, Johan Santesson and Carl Wachtmeister reported on two specimens of Ramalina homalea (=Niebla homalea) with the diterpene that were collected in 1874, one with "deposit", the other without "deposit"; however, it was not clear as to how their specimens were identified to species. In this case the taxonomy was probably based on R. Heber Howe. The presence of divaricatic acid noted in the one specimen to have the deposit included a reference to Mason E Hale Jr., Lichen Handbook. Although one of the two specimens was probably Vermilacinia laevigata, the chemotypes appear incorrectly reported as generally recognized for the species now known as Niebla homalea, which does not produce the diterpene. The same chemical data for Ramalina homalea were also reported by Gerhard Follmann, which again appear to include misidentifications for other lichen substances, without accounting for type specimens. Additionally, no reference was made to zeorin being present; the reported presence of stictic acid was likely a misidentification for salazinic acid and that of atranorin was a misidentification of usnic acid. The mold-like condition (“deposit”) has been associated with the occurrence of an unknown terpene ("T3"), which may be related to bourgeanic acid.

The "Ceruchis-Group", which was defined by Gerhard Follmann by the presence (−)-16 α-hydroxykaurane, included species subsequently classified by Peter Bowler in three groups within the genus Niebla: (1) N. homalea, (2) N. combeoides, and (3) N. ceruchis. The first two groups are generally recognized to grow on rocks, the third group (N. ceruchis) on trees and shrubs; however, the type for the species in the “Niebla ceruchis group” grows on sand and rock; the type compares closely to specimens that lack a holdfast, as might be expected for thalli growing on soil. A specimen collected by Charles Darwin was noted by him to have been found at "Iquique, 2,000 to 3,000 ft high, where clouds often hang, lying without adhesion on bare sand ... through the coast mountains, no other plant on the coast for 16 leagues inward" (Taylor Herbarium within the Farlow Herbarium, Harvard University. Vermilacinia ceruchis was described to have a cortex 75–125 microns thick, to lack apothecia, and to contain three characteristic terpenes of the N. combeoides group, described by Peter Bowler to have a thick cortex up to 200+ microns, in contrast to the corticolous lichen species, not more than 60 microns thick. There seems to be no disagreement on the morphological differences between the corticolous and saxicolous groups, only a lack of applying the appropriate types to the names, according to the International Code of Botanical Nomenclature. Despite the continued reports indicating that Niebla ceruchis, which is a synonym of Vermilacinia ceruchis, occurs on shrubs and trees in North America, it does not occur in North America. Vermilacinia ceruchis is endemic to South America, and may be extinct.

The South American species of subgenus Cylindricaria often differ from the North American species by containing methyl 3,5-dichlorolecanorate, also known as tumidulin. This was made in reference to the compound having allegedly been discovered in Ramalina ceruchis var. tumidula (basionym Usnea tumidula); however, the type specimen does not contain this compound. The references to the material from which the compound was isolated include a figure showing thalli growing on a cactus, Eulychnia acida, not on sand or rock. The report of lichen substances being present in species—without reference to type specimens—has led to considerable confusion. Many specimens of Vermilacinia in the United States National Herbarium (Smithsonian Institution, Department of Botany)—annotated by species names in the genus Niebla collected in North America—were erroneously reported to contain methyl 3,5-dichlorolecanorate, which may have been deduced from the previous erroneous reports mentioned above; the compound in question appears to be unknown, T3.

== Species ==
The following are species in the genus Vermilacinia according to their classification in subgenera.

Subgenus Vermilacinia

- Vermilacinia acicularis
- Vermilacinia cedrosensis
- Vermilacinia ceruchis
- Vermilacinia ceruchoides
- Vermilacinia combeoides
- Vermilacinia granulans
- Vermilacinia johncassadyi
- Vermilacinia laevigata
- Vermilacinia ligulata
- Vermilacinia paleoderma
- Vermilacinia polymorpha
- Vermilacinia procera
- Vermilacinia pumila
- Vermilacinia reptilioderma
- Vermilacinia rigida
- Vermilacinia robusta
- Vermilacinia rosei
- Vermilacinia tuberculata
- Vermilacinia varicosa
- Vermilacinia vesiculosa

Subgenus Cylindricaria

- Vermilacinia cephalota
- Vermilacinia cerebra
- Vermilacinia corrugata
- Vermilacinia flaccescens
- Vermilacinia howei
- Vermilacinia leonis
- Vermilacinia leopardina
- Vermilacinia nylanderi
- Vermilacinia tigrina
- Vermilacinia zebrina
