= Vermilacinia ligulata =

Scientific classification
- Domain: Eukaryota
- Kingdom: Fungi
- Division: Ascomycota
- Class: Lecanoromycetes
- Order: Lecanorales
- Family: Ramalinaceae
- Genus: Vermilacinia
- Species: V. ligulata

Binomial name
- Vermilacinia ligulata Spjut (1996)

Species of lichen

Vermilacinia ligulata is an infrequent lichen found along the foggy Pacific Coast of Baja California in rock-walled narrow arroyos, on rocky peninsulas and on ridges within the Northern Vizcaíno Desert region, ranging from Punta Cono to just north of Punta Canoas, and along the east coast of Cedros Island. The species was first collected in May 1985 in the southern part of the northern peninsula of Baja California, about 100 km north of Guerrero Negro, 400 meters inland from the ocean on rocky walls with a northern exposure in a narrow estuary. The type is from the same locality but collected one year later, 19 May 1986.

== Distinguishing features ==
Vermilacinia ligulata is distinguished by its thallus divided into relatively few basal branches, generally less than 10, although it may appear to have more by its gregarious habit, and by lacking a blackened base, not reaching more than 3 cm in height, appearing strongly crinkled and twisted with wavy branch margins (when dry), and by having lichen substances of triterpenes, referred to as T1 and T2, along with zeorin and (-)-16 α-hydroxykaurane; T3, which occurs in most related species, was not noted. Salazinic acid and usnic acid were also not reported.

The branches are often partly tubular near base, and strap shaped above, initially creeping along the substrate for a short distance before ascending upwards, and frequently divided more or less in a digitate (palmate) fashion. The overall appearance is much like Niebla contorta as exemplified by the image of its type from near Bahía Asunción. These species are distinguished by the presence or absence of chondroid strands in the medulla, and by their chemistry, N. contorta has divaricatic acid and triterpenes not found in Vermilacinia.

== Taxonomic History ==
Vermilacinia ligulata is only known from collections made by Richard Spjut during the years 1985–1996. Peter Bowler and Janet Marsh included the species, along with five others of Vermilacinia, under their Niebla laevigata,) which is regarded a synonym of V. laevigata. Vermilacinia laevigata differs by its larger thallus that often has blackened parts, is more uniformly compressed with blade-like branches that are mostly simple, and by the presence of the T3 compound, instead of the T1 and T2 triterpenes, and is geographically confined to the California Floristic Province. The triterpenes of V. ligulata, commonly referred to as T1 and T2 by their Rf values on thin-layer chromatography plates, have formulas of C_{30}H_{50}O2 (T1) and C_{30}H_{50}OO (T2) as determined by mass spectrometry of a sample of V. reptilioderma. They are known from several other species, all endemic to the central region of Baja California.
