= Vermilacinia vesiculosa =

Scientific classification
- Domain: Eukaryota
- Kingdom: Fungi
- Division: Ascomycota
- Class: Lecanoromycetes
- Order: Lecanorales
- Family: Ramalinaceae
- Genus: Vermilacinia
- Species: V. vesiculosa

Binomial name
- Vermilacinia vesiculosa Spjut (1996)

Species of fungus

Vermilacinia vesiculosa is a fruticose lichen known only from a vertical rock face north of Punta Canoas along the Pacific Coast of Baja California. The epithet vesiculosa is in reference to the bladder-like swellings on the thallus.

== Distinguishing features ==
Vermilacinia vesiculosa is classified in subgenus Vermilacinia in which it is characteristically unique in having large bladder like swellings and pycnidia elevated on pustular lobes. The round warty "bladders" develop laterally on branches and are conspicuous by their size relative to the width of the branch, up to four times greater in width than the branch. Lichen substances are of the chemotype found in most species of the subgenus: an unknown T3, the triterpene zeorin and the diterpene (-)-16 α-hydroxykaurane, with accessory β-orcinol depsidone, salazinic acid. The thallus was pendulous, lying flat against the vertical rock face, and has a cortex 100–200 μm thick.

== Taxonomic history ==
Vermilacinia vesiculosa was discovered by Richard Spjut, assisted by Richard Marin, while climbing a vertical rock face along the north side of Punta Camachos, which lies between Puerto Catarina and Punta Canoas. The species was growing in a sheltered spot below a rock overhang, 320 meters above the sea, 15 March 1994. It was reportedly observed but intentionally not collected at one other nearby site. Despite its unique features, Peter Bowler and Janet Marsh treated the species under their Niebla ceruchis, a name they misapplied to corticolous species in North America. They also included seven other corticolous species described by Spjut; the listings made without taxonomic discussion or explanation as to why they all should be treated as one species.
