= Vermilacinia acicularis =

Scientific classification
- Domain: Eukaryota
- Kingdom: Fungi
- Division: Ascomycota
- Class: Lecanoromycetes
- Order: Lecanorales
- Family: Ramalinaceae
- Genus: Vermilacinia
- Species: V. acicularis

Binomial name
- Vermilacinia acicularis Spjut (1996)

Species of lichen

Vermilacinia acicularis is a fruticose lichen that occurs in the Channel Islands of California. The type specimen was collected from San Clemente Island. Other specimens have been collected from Santa Barbara Island and Anacapa Island.

== Distinguishing features ==
Vermilacinia acicularis is classified in the subgenus Vermilacinia in which it is distinguished by the rounded outline of the thallus with clumps of basal lobes (or branches). The thallus size varies from 5–10 mm (0.20–0.39 in) in diameter. Basal branches are loosely united and frequently divided dichotomously into similar branches, the ultimate branchlets have tiny isidia-like branchlets, or true isidia, that distinguishes the species from others in the subgenus.

The thallus of Vermilacinia acicularis has a cortex up to 100 μm (0.0039 in) thick. Lichen substances are primarily of the following three terpenes that are characteristic of the subgenus Vermilacinia: an unknown referred to as "T3", (-)-16 α-hydroxykaurane, and zeorin. No accessory substances reported. Reproductive features include pynidia (conidium); apothecia unknown.

== Taxonomic history ==
Vermilacinia acicularis was described in 1996. It has alternatively been treated in the genus Niebla under a broader species concept, N. ceruchoides, without explanation. Niebla differs from Vermilacinia by the cortex differentiated into two layers, by the development of chondroid strands in the medulla, and by the absence of the diterpene (-)-16 α-hydroxykaurane and the triterpene zeorin. Vermilacinia ceruchoides differs from V. acicularis by the absence of isidia, and by the branches arising from a less defined basal area that become shortly bifurcate near apex. The whole thallus sometimes intricately branched throughout.

== Etymology ==
The specific epithet, acicularis, is derived from Latin and means "needle-shaped".
