= Vermilacinia zebrina =

Scientific classification
- Kingdom: Fungi
- Division: Ascomycota
- Class: Lecanoromycetes
- Order: Lecanorales
- Family: Ramalinaceae
- Genus: Vermilacinia
- Species: V. zebrina

Binomial name
- Vermilacinia zebrina Spjut (1996)

Species of lichen

Vermilacinia zebrina is a fruticose lichen that grows on bark of trees and shrubs, occasionally on rocks, in the fog regions along the Pacific Coast of North America, from Puget Sound in northern Washington to near El Rosario in Baja California. The epithet, zebrina, is in reference to the black transverse bands on the thallus branches; however, the species is interpreted to include thalli without black bands.

== Distinguishing Features ==
Vermilacinia zebrina is classified in the subgenus Cylindricaria in which it is distinguished from related species by thallus divided into narrow cylindrical branches arising from a holdfast; branches are 1.0–4 cm long, 0.3–1 mm wide, shortly bifurcate near apex, and have soralia often larger than the diameter of the branch. Lichen substances are usually limited to zeorin and (-)-16-hydroxykaurane, in contrast to V. cephalota that usually has additional substances of depsidones, terpenes and bougeanic acid. Usnic acid, which has no taxonomic value in the genus, is present ln most if not all species in the genus.

== Taxonomic History ==
Vermilacinia zebrina was described in 1996 by Richard Spjut;, although it appears to have been informally recognized without name by Phillip Rundel, Peter Bowler and Thomas Mulroy in 1972; they stated that “at least two morphologically distinct sorediate Desmazierias have been included within D. cephalota.” Desmazieria is an older illegitimate name (according to the International Code of Botanical Nomenclature) that was replaced by Niebla. Vermilacinia was segregated from Niebla based on difference in the cortex, medulla, and chemistry. Bowler had indicated that there were three sorediate species in the genus but later recognized only one sorediate species. Spjut recognized three sorediate species in subgenus Cylindricaria, and suggested that V. zebrina might comprise two species. Two additional sorediate species have been described from South America.
