= Vermilacinia rigida =

Scientific classification
- Domain: Eukaryota
- Kingdom: Fungi
- Division: Ascomycota
- Class: Lecanoromycetes
- Order: Lecanorales
- Family: Ramalinaceae
- Genus: Vermilacinia
- Species: V. rigida

Binomial name
- Vermilacinia rigida Spjut (1996)

Species of lichen

Vermilacinia rigida is a dark green, rare fruticose lichen that occurs in fog areas along the Pacific Coast of Baja California, known only from two locations about 100 km north of Guerrero Negro. The epithet, rigida, is in regard to its stiff thallus branches.

== Distinguishing features ==
Vermilacinia rigida is classified in the subgenus Vermilacina in which it is distinguished by the thallus divided into short rigid erect branches blackened to about ¼ the way up from the base. The branches are strongly compressed, resembling short grass-like blades, 0.5 to 2 cm high and 1–4 mm wide. Lichen substances are primarily the diterpene (-)-16 α-hydroxykaurane, with trace amounts of zeorin, or zeorin lacking, and two other unknowns, one of which is referred to as the T4 compound that is found in V. combeoides and V. pumila. The other unknown was not reported in any other species. The T3 compound, bourgeanic acid, and salazinic acid, which commonly occur in species of the subgenus Vermilacinia, were also not reported.

Vermilacinia rigida—easily recognized at a glance—is most similar in morphology to V. laevigata, a species that is twice its size and often less definite in its shape of the branches, irregularly widened in areas to as much as 3.5 cm across. Both species have a relatively smooth cortical surface, but the cortex is generally twice as thick in V. laevigata, 100–175 μm thick, compared to 40–95 μm thick in V. rigida. Vermilacinia laevigata also differs in its chemistry, lichen substances include the T3 compound, bourgeanic acid, and zeorin that are consistently present.

== Taxonomic history ==
Vermilacinia rigida was discovered by Richard Spjut, accompanied by Richard Marin and Thomas McCloud, on 19 May 1986 just south of Punta Negra on rock outcrops on a ridge that appeared to have received more precipitation from ocean fog than other nearby areas (Plate 1D in Spjut's 1996 revision of Niebla and Vermilacinia). This particular ridge was observed during May 1985 by Spjut—while he and Marin were collecting samples of lichens in search of new drugs to treat HIV—to have fog lingering around the peaks most of the day). The following year, in May 1986, a special effort was made to find a path to the ridges and peaks. In addition to V. rigida, other rare new species of lichens were discovered, Niebla infundibula and N. homaleoides, the latter was also found with V. rigida on Punta Cono, 15 April 1990.

Peter Bowler and Janet Marsh included Vermilacinia rigida, among four other species of Vermilacinia with a flattened branch type of morphology (V. johncassadyi V. ligulata, V. rosei, V. varicosa), and one with cylindrical branch type (V. paleoderma), under their Niebla laevigata (= Vermilacinia laevigata). No explanation was provided as to why they considered all these species the same as V. laevigata, especially since they also recognized many species with cylindrical branch types (V. cedrosensis, V. combeoides, V. robusta, V. procera), all of which were named by Bowler and collaborators in Niebla. This was in contrast to all Spjut's species described to have a flattened blade morphology that were rejected by Bowler. While Spjut accepted Bowler's species, even though he had also independently had recognized many of them (Niebla isidiaescens, V. ceruchoides, V. laevigata, V. procera), not a single species described by Spjut was accepted by Bowler and Marsh. The genus Vermilacinia differs from Niebla in the absence of chondroid strands, by not having cortical ridges define branch margins, and by producing terpenes and bourgeanic acid not found in Niebla
