= Vermilacinia varicosa =

Scientific classification
- Domain: Eukaryota
- Kingdom: Fungi
- Division: Ascomycota
- Class: Lecanoromycetes
- Order: Lecanorales
- Family: Ramalinaceae
- Genus: Vermilacinia
- Species: V. varicosa

Binomial name
- Vermilacinia varicosa Spjut (1996)

Species of fungus

Vermilacinia varicosa is a fruticose lichen known from two islands along the Pacific Coast of central Baja California, Isla San Roque located just off the southern Vizcaíno Peninsula west of Bahía Asuncón and Cedros Island where found on precipitous rocks along the northwest coast. The epithet, varicosa, is in reference to the unusually dilated type of branch in the genus. The lichen was first collected by Joseph Nelson Rose on 15 March 1911 during the Albatross Expedition. His lichen specimens had been kept separate from the mounted and filed lichen collections in the herbarium at the Smithsonian Institution, Department of Botany, US) loose in brown standard herbarium paper, and were made available to Richard Spjut sometime after 1986 while he was undertaking a revision of the genus Niebla

== Distinguishing features ==
Vermilacinia varicosa is classified in subgenus Vermilacinia in which it is distinguished from related species by its thallus divided into relatively few fan-shaped branches (less than 10)—widely expanded above a short narrow stalk-like base—and by its secondary metabolites of terpenoid compounds that generally characterize the subgenus: an unknown T3, the triterpene zeorin and the diterpene (-)-16 α-hydroxykaurane, with an accessory β-orcinol depsidone, salazinic acid. The broadly expanded branches from base to apex is similar to V. robusta, which differs by its thallus divided into tubular shaped branches, but it is difficult to judge from pressed specimens to what degree branches of V. varicosa are inflated in its natural form.

Vermilacinia rosei, also collected by Rose from Isla San Roque, appears morphologically indistinguishable, differing only in chemistry of the triterpenes, which have taxonomic significance from a phytogeography point of view Vermilacinia johncassadyi, for example, which has the T1 and T2 triterpenes, and is found only in the Vizcaíno Desert, is morphologically similar but geographical separated from V. laevigata, a species of the California Floristic Province that differs morphologically by stalked apothecia and chemically by the lichens substances generally found in the subgenus. Vermilacinia cedrosensis and V. reptilioderma are similar species with the same chemotype differences but are not geographically separated, however, they show slight differences in cortical features; while their taxonomic distinction is complicated by the related species V. paleoderma and V. polymorpha that overlap only partly in their geographical distribution. Emphasis has been given to chemical characters because they correlate with known phytogeographical and ecological differences in vascular plants as outlined in Richard Spjut’s introduction and taxonomic keys to the species. This is in contrast to Peter Bowler and Janet Marsh who felt the “chemical based taxonomy of the 1940s–1960s” was history, which should be abandoned; however, the trend now is to favor more species; for example, 126 species were recognized from a single lichen species.

The triterpenes T1 and T2 appear as major lichen substances in thin-layer chromatography. Lacking DNA phylogeny data, and detailed knowledge of their biosynthetic pathways, which in this case appears to involve the mevalonic acid pathway, it is difficult to determine whether the terpenes T1 and T2 are additive, or are an ancestral trait to the other compounds more widely distributed in the subgenus Vermilacinia.

== Taxonomic history ==
Vermilacinia varicosa, described in 1996 by Spjut, was considered by Bowler and Marsh in 2004 to be the same as V. laevigata, among five other species. Among the species recognized by Bowler and Marsh, V. varicosa resembles V. robusta more than V. laevigata, but it would appear that the apparent flattened branch morphology is the character attribute that was given taxonomic weight. No explanation was provided by Bowler and Marsh as to why all these species belonged to just one species.
