= Vermilacinia robusta =

Scientific classification
- Domain: Eukaryota
- Kingdom: Fungi
- Division: Ascomycota
- Class: Lecanoromycetes
- Order: Lecanorales
- Family: Ramalinaceae
- Genus: Vermilacinia
- Species: V. robusta

Binomial name
- Vermilacinia robusta (R.Howe) Spjut & Hale (1995)

Synonyms
- Ramalina combeoides var. robusta R.Howe (1913)

Species of lichen

Vermilacinia robusta is an olive-green fruticose lichen that occurs on rocks near ocean mist along the foggy Pacific Coast of southern California to northern Baja California and offshore islands. The epithet, robusta, was probably adopted in recognizing a more robust form of V. comboides, originally described as a variety of Ramalina combeoides by Reginald Heber Howe, Jr. in 1913.

== Distinguishing features ==
Vermilainia robusta is classified in the subgenus Vermilacinia in which it is easily recognized by its relatively small number basal tubular branches, generally 5–10 in number, often inflated and connected to a basal holdfast. Deflated forms can be difficult to distinguish from other related species, but generally recognized by the simple branches that are relatively broad to their short length, not more than 4 cm long, up to 6 mm in diameter. Lichen substances are typical of the subgenus: T3, zeorin, and (-)-16 α-hydroxykaurane, occasionally with salazinic acid.

== Taxonomic history ==
The species was first recognized as a variety of Ramalina combeoides by Reginald Heber Howe, Jr. in 1913; William Nylander had described the species in 1870. Phillip Rundel and Peter Bowler elevated it to species status in 1978 when they renamed species in the illegitimate genus Desmazieria. to Niebla The species was transferred to Vermilacinia when described in 1995, distinguished by its cortical morphology, lack of chondroid strands in the medulla, and by its lichen metabolites, notably (-)-16 α-hydroxykaurane. Peter Bowler and Janet Marsh, however, in 2004 retained the species in Niebla.
