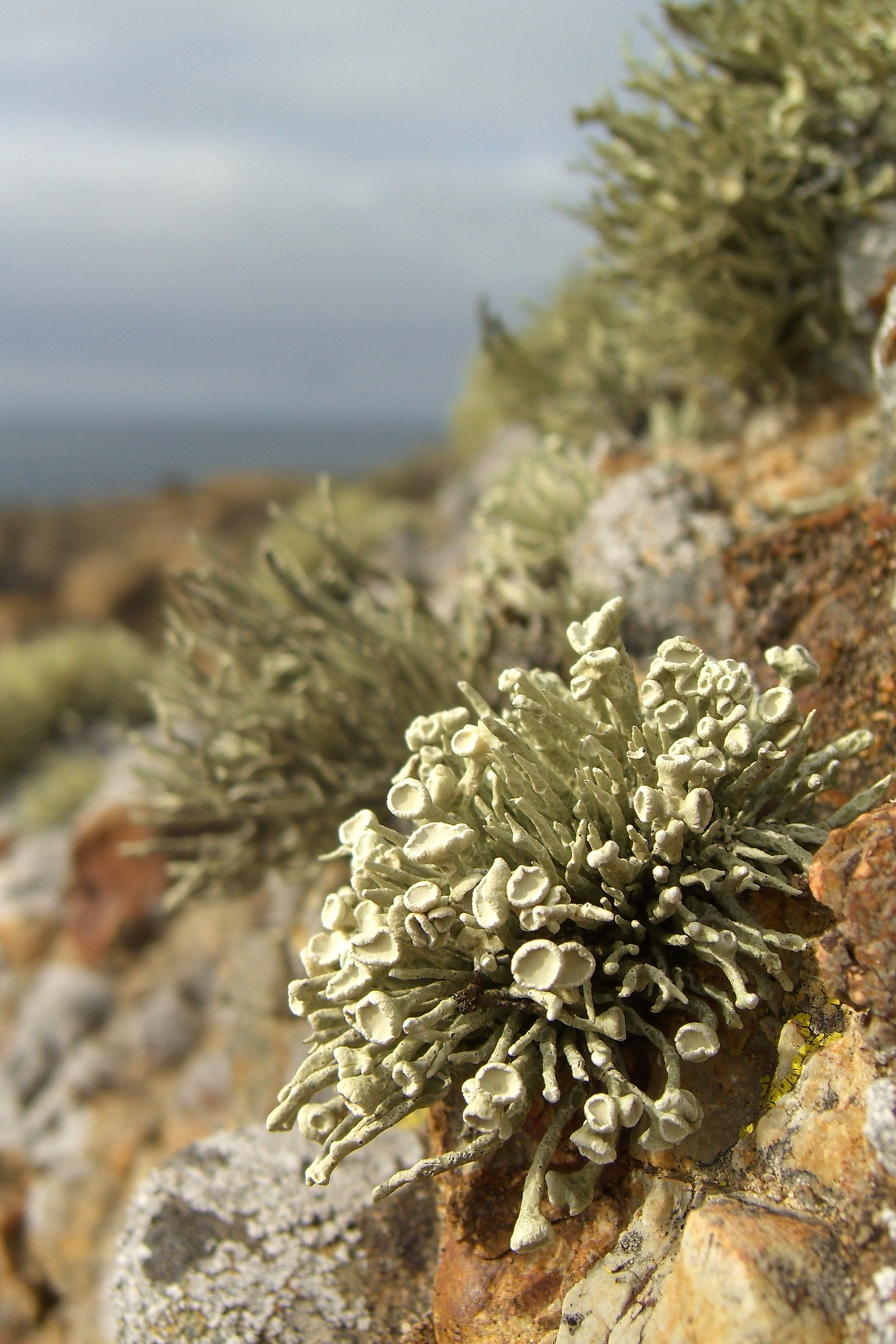
- at Point Lobos, California

Scientific classification
- Domain: Eukaryota
- Kingdom: Fungi
- Division: Ascomycota
- Class: Lecanoromycetes
- Order: Lecanorales
- Family: Ramalinaceae
- Genus: Vermilacinia
- Species: V. combeoides

Binomial name
- Vermilacinia combeoides (Nylander) Spjut & Hale (1995)

Synonyms
- Ramalina combeoides Nyl. (1870)

= Vermilacinia combeoides =

Species of lichen

Vermilacinia combeoides is a fruticose lichen found on rocks along the Pacific Coast of North America from Sonoma County, California south to San Quintín, Baja California, and also on Santa Catalina Island and Guadalupe Island.

== Distinguishing features ==
Vermilacinia combeoides is distinguished by round clumps of erect tubular branches that are 2–4 cm high, averaging 1 cm in diameter, mostly undivided. The surface of the cortex appears uneven due to irregular protrusion of ridges and development of transverse cracks. Pycnidia are inconspicuous, immersed in the cortex. Apothecia are solitary or few clustered near ends of branches.

A characteristic lichen substance is the diterpene (-)-16 α-hydroxykaurane. Unlike many species in subgenus Vermilacinia, V. combeoides does not produce the unknown terpene, T3, and zeorin, a triterpene common in most species in the genus, is often absent. Two other apparent terpenes, T4 and T5, are also common and distinctive for the species, but not always present; T4 also occurs occasionally in other species. Accessory substances are often present such as usnic acid and salazinic acid. Bourgeanic acid has also been reported.

== Taxonomic history ==
Vermilacinia combeoides was first described by William Nylander in 1870 as a species of Ramalina, which differs by the absence of the secondary metabolite (-)-16 α-hydroxykaurane and chondroid strands in the medulla, and by having pale pycnidia, or pycnidia may be absent. It was later referred to Desmazieria in 1966 and Niebla in 1978. Vermilacinia pumila is most similar to V. combeoides; the former differs by the shorter partly inflated branches, usually without apothecia.

The species (V. combeoides) was reported to occur in South America; however, it was later concluded that the material cited for this record was from California mounted on the same specimen card with specimens of the South American species, V. ceruchis, for comparative purposes.

Vermilacinia combeoides is also considered a synonym of Niebla combeoides. Studies are needed on the DNA phylogeny of the genera, which differ substantially both morphologically and chemically.
