= Vermilacinia ceruchis =

Scientific classification
- Kingdom: Fungi
- Division: Ascomycota
- Class: Lecanoromycetes
- Order: Lecanorales
- Family: Ramalinaceae
- Genus: Vermilacinia
- Species: V. ceruchis

Binomial name
- Vermilacinia ceruchis (Ach.) Spjut & Hale (1995)

Synonyms
- Parmelia ceruchis Ach. (1803)

Species of lichen

Vermilacinia ceruchis is a fruticose lichen found on sand and rock in coastal fog areas of Peru and Chile.

== Description ==
The typical form of the species (V. ceruchis) is distinguished from related species in the genus by its relatively few branches with a thick cortex (75–125 microns thick), and by the lack of apothecia. The secondary branches bifurcate near the apex, appearing antler-like and taper to a pointed apex. The type specimens include one collected by Joseph Dombey near Lima of Peru and another by Archibald Menzies (lectotype) from Chile, possibly near Valparaíso. They appear to have been collected on sand based on the apparent habit of the thallus for the Menzies specimen, which shows branches arising mostly along one side of a main branch, and by its similarity to another specimen collected by Charles Darwin, who indicated that he found his specimen at "Iquique, 2,000 to 3,000 ft high, where clouds often hang ... lying without adhesion on bare sand ... through the coast mountains, no other plant on the coast for 16 leagues inward".

This sand-dwelling typical form may be extinct in view of Gerhard Follmann's reported effort to locate the “Darwin’s lichen oasis” since 1960. In 1994, Follmann reportedly encountered a "lichen oasis" at 800–900 meters altitude further north than where the "Darwin Oasis" was thought to have occurred in northern Chile. Vermilacinia ceruchis was not among the "macrolichens" lichens he reportedly found, which were: "Heterodermia leucomelos, Niebla tigrina, Ramalina celastri, R. cochlearis, R. peruviana, R. pilulifera, Roccellina suffruticosa, and Xanthoria mendozae, all deviating ecologically and (or) morphologically from the typical forms." These were in "mats" in sheltered soil depressions among cactus skeletons and diorite rocks that had "mass development of saxicolous ecotype of Chrysothrix pavonii". Follmann further stated Austropeltis pervuiana and Leprocaulon subalbicans were on ground; on cactus skeletons were Trentepohlia sp., Roccellaria mollis and Tornabea ephebea. Niebla tigrina is classified in subgenus Cylindricaria as a synonym of Vermilacinia tigrina, which is also much like V. leopardina of coastal Baja California, differing only in accessory lichen substances. Both species occur on shrubs and cacti in South America; V. tigrina also occurs on soil among cacti in South America.

== Taxonomic history ==
Vermilacinia ceruchis is perhaps the most confused species and misapplied name in the Vermilacinia-Niebla complex, which encompasses the genera of Vermilacinia, Niebla, and species in Ramalina related to R. bourgeana, as explained below. It was first described by Erik Acharius in 1803 as a species of Parmelia (P. ceruchis). In 1810, Acharius transferred the species to the genus Borrera (B. ceruchis) in his Lichenographia Universalis where he also was the first to describe and name Ramalina homalea, from a specimen collected by Menzies on rocks around San Francisco. In 1852, Jean Camille Montagne viewed the two species as one and the same in a new monotypic genus, Desmazieria (D. homalea), an illegitimate name according to the International Code of Botanical Nomenclature (Art. 53.3), but its illegitimacy was not realized until 128 years later; replaced by Niebla. Parmelia ceruchis had also been classified in other genera, Usnea (U. ceruchis) by Montagne in 1834, Evernia by Montagne in 1844, and Ramalina by de Bory in 1828. and De Notaris in 1846, before placed in Desmazieria, and had included wide varieties and one other South American species, Usnea tumidula, distinguished by Thomas Taylor by its cylindrical branches with smooth irregular swellings as in "Alectoria" but with the "central strand of Usnea."

But lichenologists generally did not accept Montagne's 1852 view of the species (Desmazieria homalea) as the only one in the genus, occurring in both North America and South America. The South American thalli, which had been interpreted to grow on sand, rocks and shrubs, were reinstated to Ramalina ceruchis, and the North American thalli, strictly found on rocks, were returned to Ramalina homalea.

In 1866, Edward Tuckerman reported Ramalina ceruchis to occur in North America, on trees on Alcatraz Island and near San Diego (California), identified by "Dr. Cooper" and "Mr. Wright"; however, William Nylander in his monograph of Ramalina in 1870 still considered Ramalina ceruchis to occur only in South America. What was thought to be Ramalina ceruchis in North America seems to have been regarded by Nylander as Ramalina testudinaria, a new species he recognized to grow on trees, shrubs and also rocks, but the type specimens evidently came from rocks near Monterey, California. R. Heber Howe, Jr., in 1913 in his revision of the North American species of Ramalina, recognized Ramalina ceruchis as a common species on shrubs and trees, and also on sandstone, from San Juan Island to San Diego and the Channel Islands, while he also recognized R. testudinaria to occur strictly on rocks in coastal California. Howe had also studied the type specimens and presented images of them.

It seems that Howe firmly established Ramalina ceruchis as a corticolous lichen species in North America, whereas its occurrence in South America was still viewed as one that grew on rocks, sand and shrubs including cacti. Additionally, Nylander also described R. combeoides (=Vermilacinia combeoides) as a new species growing on rocks around San Francisco, California, and R. flaccescens (=Vermilacinia flaccescens) to occur on shrubs near Coquimbo, Chile and near San Lorenzo, Peru. Since Nylander's monograph in 1870, the South American species of Vermilacinia ceruchis and related species there have not been revised except for those interpreted to occur in North America. Saxicolous variants of typical Vermilacinia ceruchis have branches that arise from a holdfast, and well-developed apothecia.

Although Howe recognized Ramalina (Vermilacinia) ceruchis as a corticolous species, his interpretation of it as being the same as the type from South America is not supported by the thin-layer chromatography data. The corticolous North American species (subgenus Cylindricaria) generally lack the T3 compound, except species that produce soredia, and two other species that mostly occur in Baja California, V. cerebra, distinguished by swollen apical lobes, and V. tigrina, by accessory lichen substances of depsidones. The species are even more distinct by differences in the lichen cortex, features that distinguish subgenera Cylindricaria and Vermilacinia. In view of these differences Vermilacinia ceruchis is strictly a South American species, which includes other species that have yet to be clearly defined. The species of Vermilacinia that occur on trees and shrubs along the Pacific Coast north of Baja California include: V. cephalota (frequent, California to southeastern Alaska), V. cerebra (infrequent, Los Angeles southwards and Channel Islands), V. corrugata (rare, Channel Islands), V. leopardina (rare on mainland, occasional in Channel Islands), V. nylanderi (infrequent, Channel Islands), and V. zebrina (frequent, California).
