= Bourgeanic acid =

Names
- IUPAC name (2S,3S,4R,6R)-3-[(2S,3S,4R,6R)-3-hydroxy-2,4,6-trimethyloctanoyl]oxy-2,4,6-trimethyloctanoic acid
- Other names (+)-bourgeanic acid

Identifiers
CAS Number	43043-17-0
3D model (JSmol)	Interactive image
ChEBI	CHEBI:144204
ChemSpider	9080413
PubChem CID	10905154
- InChI: InChI=1S/C22H42O5/c1-9-13(3)11-15(5)19(23)17(7)22(26)27-20(18(8)21(24)25)16(6)12-14(4)10-2/h13-20,23H,9-12H2,1-8H3,(H,24,25)/t13-,14-,15-,16-,17+,18+,19+,20+/m1/s1 Key: ZQEUMOKDJCSNHB-IHRHECOVSA-N
- SMILES: CC[C@@H](C)C[C@@H](C)[C@@H]([C@H](C)C(=O)O[C@@H]([C@H](C)C[C@H](C)CC)[C@H](C)C(=O)O)O

Properties
Chemical formula	C_{22}H_{42}O_{5}
Molar mass	386.573 g·mol^{−1}
- Except where otherwise noted, data are given for materials in their standard state (at 25 °C [77 °F], 100 kPa). Infobox references

Bourgeanic acid is a fatty acid with the molecular formula C_{22}H_{42}O_{5}. Bourgeanic acid is a lichen metabolite.
