= Zeorin =

Names
- IUPAC name (3S,3aS,5aR,5bR,7S,7aS,11aR,11bR,13aR,13bS)-3-(2-hydroxypropan-2-yl)-5a,5b,8,8,11a,13b-hexamethyl-1,2,3,3a,4,5,6,7,7a,9,10,11,11b,12,13,13a-hexadecahydrocyclopenta[a]chrysen-7-ol

Identifiers
CAS Number	22570-53-2
3D model (JSmol)	Interactive image
ChEBI	CHEBI:67966
ChemSpider	140607
PubChem CID	159931
CompTox Dashboard (EPA)	DTXSID80945223
- InChI: InChI=1S/C30H52O2/c1-25(2)14-9-15-28(6)23-11-10-22-27(5)16-12-19(26(3,4)32)20(27)13-17-29(22,7)30(23,8)18-21(31)24(25)28/h19-24,31-32H,9-18H2,1-8H3/t19-,20-,21-,22+,23+,24-,27-,28+,29+,30+/m0/s1 Key: KYBLAIAGFNCVHL-PMVHANJISA-N
- SMILES: C[C@]12CC[C@@H]([C@@H]1CC[C@@]3([C@@H]2CC[C@H]4[C@]3(C[C@@H]([C@@H]5[C@@]4(CCCC5(C)C)C)O)C)C)C(C)(C)O

Properties
Chemical formula	C_{30}H_{52}O_{2}
Molar mass	444.744 g·mol^{−1}
Melting point	236–242 °C
- Except where otherwise noted, data are given for materials in their standard state (at 25 °C [77 °F], 100 kPa). Infobox references

Zeorin is a triterpene with the molecular formula C_{30}H_{52}O_{2} which occurs in many lichens.
