= Fruticose lichen =

Form of lichen

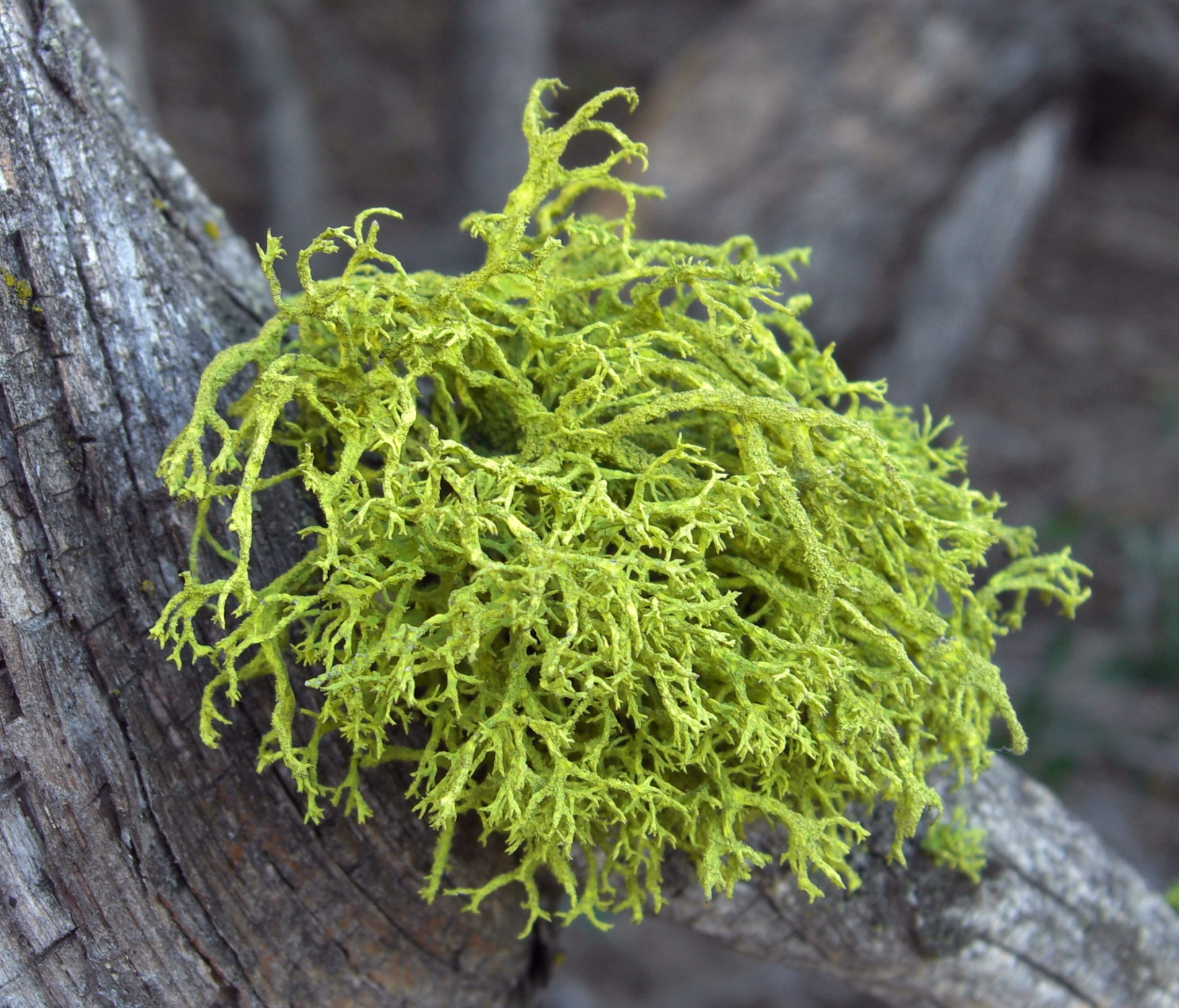
Letharia vulpina, a species of fruticose lichen

A fruticose lichen is a form of lichen fungi that is characterized by a coral-like shrubby or bushy growth structure. It is formed from a symbiotic relationship of a photobiont such as green algae or less commonly cyanobacteria and one, two or more mycobionts. Fruticose lichens are not a monophyletic and holophyletic lineage, but are a form encountered in many classes. Fruticose lichens have a complex vegetation structure, and are characterized by an ascending, bushy or pendulous appearance. As with other lichens, many fruticose lichens can endure high degrees of desiccation. They grow slowly and often occur in habitats such as on tree barks, on rock surfaces and on soils in the Arctic and mountain regions.

== Characteristics ==
Characteristic of fruticose lichen is the shape of the thallus. Like crustose lichen, fruticose lichen is composed of a holdfast which will act as an anchor for the lichen to grow in rock fissures, over loose sand or soil.

== Growth and structure ==
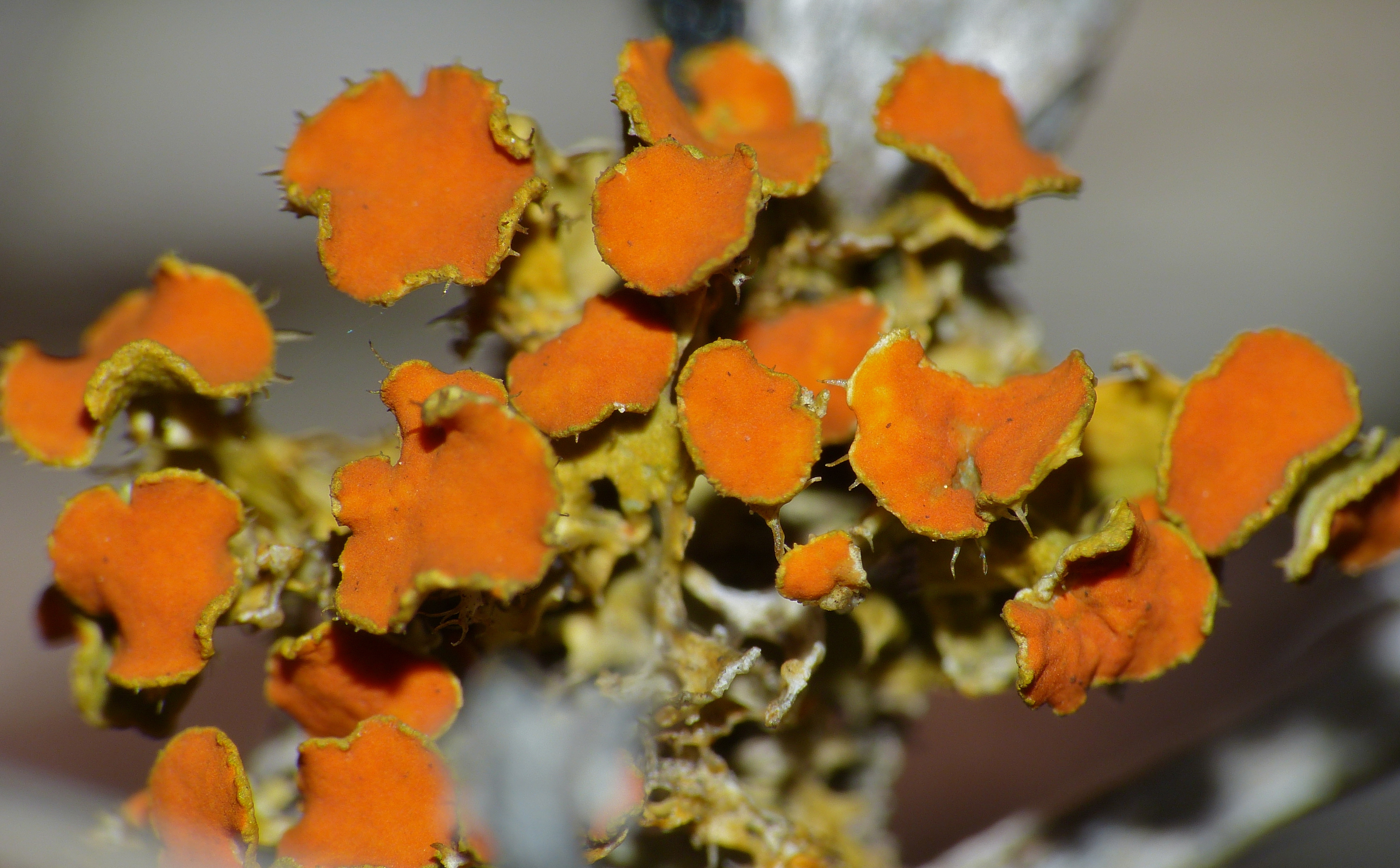
Teloschistes chrysophthalmus

Fruticose or ‘shrubby’ lichens differ from other forms of lichen because their bushy form is attached to the substrate only at the base of the lichen. A continuous algal layer grows around the circumference of the branches of the lichen. Many fruticose lichens have fine, round, hair-like structures and are loosely attached to rocks and trees. Although fruticose lichens are defined as being bushy, some can exhibit a flattened and strap-like appearances. Highly branched fruticose lichen have a high surface to volume ratio that results in a rapid drying and wetting pattern compared to lichens that have a lower surface to volume ratio.

The internal structure of a fruticose lichen branch has a dense outer cortex, a thin algal layer, a medulla and a hollow center or a dense central cord. The structure of fruticose lichens depends also on their mycobionts. Lichen undergoes diffuse growth and the thallus elongates over time. New branch cells grow through the wall materials of older neighboring cells. Microenvironmental conditions influence individual thalli and branches, causing non-uniform growth. There may be many stages of growth for fruticose lichen from the beginning to end of their life cycle.

== Diversity ==
There are many different varieties of fruticose lichen. They are encountered in the following classes: Arthoniales, Licinales, Baeomycetales, Candelariales, Lecanorales, Peltigerales, Pertusariales, Teloschistales, and Mycocaliciales, among others. Each type of fruticose lichen will differ in structure, and some types will be more dominant in a particular environment compared to other forms of fruticose lichen.

- Pseudephebe minuscula has a fruticose thallus consisting of thin branches that result in the formation of dense mats.
- Pseudephebe pubescens has thin branches that are loosely entangled.

== Distribution and accumulation ==
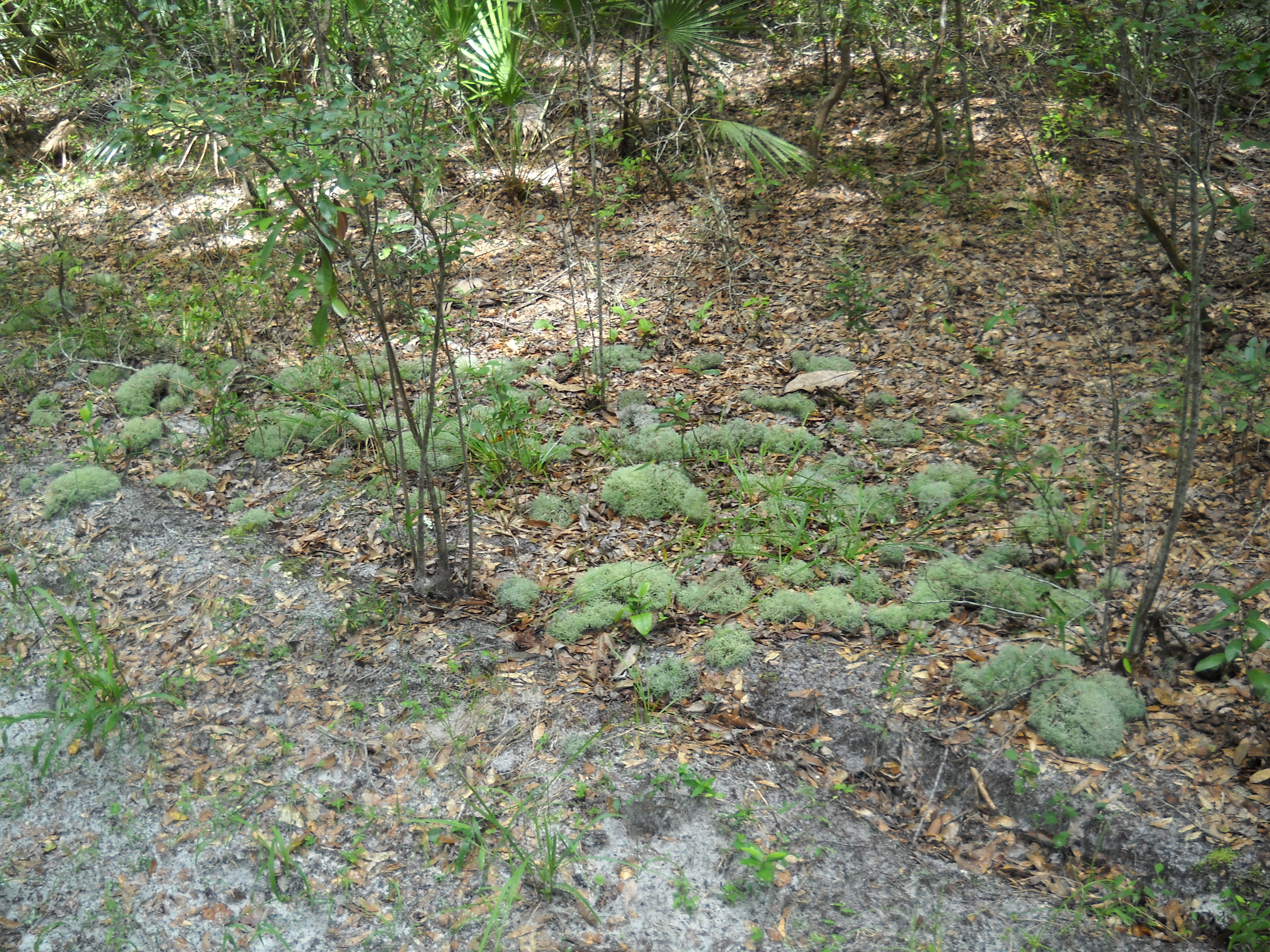
Group of fruiticose lichen

Fruticose growth forms can be found world-wide in wet humid climates, in temperate rainforests, or in arid conditions. Fruticose lichens are most commonly distributed in mountains, forests and arctic tundra. The accumulation rate of lichen varies within different environments. Lichen biomass accumulation rates decrease from mountain to alpine belts and from tree top to base.

== Economic and ecological significance ==
Although they lack economic importance comparable to that of their algal and fungal components, some lichens play an important role in nitrogen cycling, providing critical winter forage for caribou and colonizing newly exposed surfaces.
