= Albemarlea =

Scientific classification
- Kingdom: Fungi
- Division: Ascomycota
- Class: Lecanoromycetes
- Order: Umbilicariales
- Family: Fuscideaceae
- Genus: Albemarlea; Lendemer & R.C.Harris (2016)
- Species: A. pamlicoensis

Binomial name
- Albemarlea pamlicoensis Lendemer & R.C.Harris (2016)

Species of lichen

Albemarlea is a fungal genus in the family Fuscideaceae. A monotypic genus, it contains the single corticolous (bark-dwelling) lichen species Albemarlea pamlicoensis discovered in the Bull Neck Swamp of the Albemarle-Pamlico Peninsula, North Carolina. Characterized by a crust-like thallus, Fuscidea-type asci, and a green coccoid photobiont, A. pamlicoensis demonstrates unique morphological characteristics that distinguish it from other polysporous lichens. Although it shows certain similarities to the genera Maronea and Piccolia, the differences in apothecia and absence of specific pigments mark its distinctiveness. As this species has been found in only one location despite extensive surveys, it highlights the need for continued conservation efforts and further research to ascertain its full distribution and potential threats.

== Taxonomy ==
Albemarlea is a newly classified genus introduced by James Lendemer and Richard C. Harris. It is named after the Albemarle-Pamlico Peninsula in North Carolina and the Albemarle Sound, a large body of water adjacent to the peninsula. The sole known population of this genus is found in the Bull Neck Swamp, a conservation area in the same region that boasts the largest untouched shoreline on the Albemarle Sound. The genus' only species, Albemarlea pamlicoensis, was also named by Lendemer and R.C. Harris, with the name intended as a tribute to the Pamlico Sound, a body of water to the south of the type locality. The type specimen was found in Washington County, North Carolina at Bull Neck Swamp, within a mixed hardwood forest featuring species such as beech, oak, maple, and holly.

Phylogenetic relationships within the family Fuscideaceae, where Albemarlea was tentatively placed, remain to be fully confirmed with molecular data. A related genus could be Maronea, which displays similar characteristics, but differences in apothecia and the absence of certain secondary compounds suggest distinctions between the two. It has also been postulated that the genus might be related to Piccolia, primarily due to similarities in apothecial anatomy, although this connection remains to be validated through molecular studies.

== Description ==
Albemarlea pamlicoensis is identified by its crustose thallus, Fuscidea-type asci with numerous hyaline, ellipsoid, simple ascospores, and a green coccoid photobiont. It further possesses biatorine apothecia and two types of pycnidia – conspicuous macropycnidia with narrowly fusiform, two-celled hyaline macroconidia, and inconspicuous micropycnidia embedded in the thallus, producing hyaline, curved or bent rod-shaped simple macroconidia. No lichen substances have been detected in this species, and it tests negative for common chemical spot tests.

== Similar species ==
In field observations, Albemarlea pamlicoensis might be confused with other crustose lichens that produce sporodochia. Its abundant macropycnidia, which create a distinctive white mass that resembles sporodochia, can be misleading. However, its unique combination of morphological characteristics sets it apart from other polysporous lichens. Although the Fuscidea-type asci indicate a potential connection to the genus Maronea, the absence of secondary compounds and distinct form of apothecia support a clear distinction between the two. Furthermore, its apothecial anatomy is quite similar to that of the genus Piccolia, particularly the species P. conspersa and P. nannaria. Despite this, the absence of specific pigments in the apothecia and unique form of conidia differentiate Albemarlea from this genus as well.

== Habitat and distribution ==
Despite extensive surveys in the Mid-Atlantic Coastal Plain (MACP), Albemarlea pamlicoensis has only been found in a single location – at the base of a mature American beech tree in the type locality. The habitat at this location is atypical for the region, featuring a mature hardwood forest surrounded by swamp forests hosting different vascular plant and lichen communities. This rare lichen species was not found at other locations with similar natural communities.

== Conservation ==
Given its limited distribution – known from only a single location – Albemarlea pamlicoensis could potentially be vulnerable to environmental changes or disturbances. Its solitary known habitat in the Bull Neck Swamp, a protected area, is currently safeguarded, but ongoing monitoring and further exploration of the MACP are required to understand the true distribution and potential threats to this lichen species.
