= Fuscidea ramboldioides =

Scientific classification
- Kingdom: Fungi
- Division: Ascomycota
- Class: Lecanoromycetes
- Order: Umbilicariales
- Family: Fuscideaceae
- Genus: Fuscidea
- Species: F. ramboldioides

Binomial name
- Fuscidea ramboldioides Kantvilas (2001)
- Holotype: Summit of Mount Freycinet, Tasmania

Species of lichen-forming fungus

Fuscidea ramboldioides is a species of saxicolous (rock-dwelling) crustose lichen in the family Fuscideaceae. First described from Mount Freycinet in Tasmania in 2001, it has since been recorded from mainland Australia, including New South Wales and Western Australia. The lichen forms extensive greyish-brown crusts on granite rocks that can reach nearly a metre wide. It is readily confused with the common Ramboldia petraeoides, which inspired its scientific name, though the two species differ in their internal chemistry and ascospore structure.

== Taxonomy ==
Fuscidea ramboldioides was described as a new species by Gintaras Kantvilas from material collected on the summit of Mt Freycinet in eastern Tasmania. The type specimen was gathered in November 1999 from east-facing granite boulders at about 615 m elevation, with an earlier collection from the same mountain cited as additional material. In describing the species, Kantvilas compared it with the superficially similar Fuscidea mollis and F. austera, both of which also contain divaricatic acid but differ in having smaller apothecia and shorter, more broadly ellipsoid spores. He also distinguished it from F. cyathoides var. japonica, which has consistently bean-shaped or dumbbell-shaped ascospores with a marked constriction.

The species can be confused in the field with the very common Tasmanian lichen Ramboldia petraeoides, with which it often occurs. Both have brown, crustose thalli, but those of Ramboldia are usually darker, less scurfy and less cracked, and its apothecia are flatter, glossy and dark brown. Chemically and anatomically the two are quite different: Ramboldia petraeoides produces norstictic acid and has narrowly ellipsoid, simple, hyaline ascospores, whereas F. ramboldioides has large, 1-septate, brown, oblong-ellipsoid spores and contains divaricatic acid. The specific epithet ramboldioides alludes to this superficial resemblance to Ramboldia petraeoides.

== Description ==
Fuscidea ramboldioides is a crustose, rock-dwelling lichen that forms extensive but discontinuous patches from a few centimetres across to nearly 1 m wide. The thallus is markedly rimose-areolate, meaning it is cracked into small, tile-like units, and has a rather abraded, scurfy surface. It is pale to dingy greyish brown and 120–150 μm thick. The prothallus, a marginal zone of bare fungal tissue, is poorly developed and at most appears as a narrow blackish band about 0.3 mm wide. The internal medulla does not react with iodine (I–), and the photosynthetic partner (photobiont) consists of more or less rounded to oblong algal cells 10–16 μm wide.

The fruiting bodies (apothecia) are scattered over the thallus, lecideine in form (with a black disc and margin of fungal tissue only) and sessile. They are constricted at the base, 0.2–0.5 mm wide and 240–260 μm thick, usually roundish but sometimes deformed or contorted. The disc is flat and black, while the margin is thick, rolled inwards when young, and either the same colour as the disc or somewhat paler and brownish; the margin persists into maturity. In vertical section the exciple is 40–70 μm thick at the sides, dark brown at the outer edge, and its pigment turns somewhat olive-brown in potassium hydroxide solution (K). The hypothecium beneath the hymenium is colourless, 40–80 μm thick and densely filled with oil droplets 2–5 μm wide. The hymenium itself is colourless, 60–70 μm thick, capped by a dark brown epihymenial layer 10–20 μm thick. The paraphyses are simple or occasionally forked filaments 2–2.5 μm thick with swollen, brown-pigmented tips 3–4.5 μm thick. The asci are 8-spored, ellipsoid to pear-shaped and measure 40–55 × 15–22 μm.

The ascospores are a key diagnostic feature of F. ramboldioides. They are relatively large for the genus, usually oblong-ellipsoid with abruptly rounded ends, sometimes bean-shaped and only very rarely showing a slight constriction in the middle. They measure 9–15 × 4–8 μm (based on 60 spores measured). When young they are hyaline and simple, but at maturity they are typically pale brown and have a single septum, and in old specimens they become roughened and ornamented. Asexual structures are scarce: pycnidia are very inconspicuous, immersed in the thallus, and apparently rare; the conidia are ellipsoid, 3.5–4 × 2 μm. Spot tests on the medulla are negative (K−, KC−, C−, Pd−), but under ultraviolet light the lichen shows a faint white fluorescence, indicating the presence of the secondary metabolite (lichen product) divaricatic acid.

== Habitat and distribution ==
At the time of its original publication, Fuscidea ramboldioides was known only from Mt Freycinet on the east coast of Tasmania, where it is very abundant at the summit. There, the lichen grows on Devonian granite, either on vertical, exposed rock faces or in sheltered, moist overhangs. It is usually associated with a rich assemblage of mostly unidentified, rock-dwelling (saxicolous) crustose lichens. Kantvilas considered it likely to be more widespread but previously overlooked. The lichen was later recorded from New South Wales and Western Australia. Mainland material generally shows a darker, thinner thallus and correspondingly thinner apothecia.

The type locality is a low coastal mountain that receives relatively low annual rainfall, around 700 mm, but is strongly influenced by sea mist and low cloud. These conditions appear to provide enough moisture to support a lichen funga more typical of the wetter western parts of Tasmania, including species of Bunodophoron and Cladonia murrayi. Within this setting F. ramboldioides is abundant at the summit but absent from the lower slopes, which instead carry a lichen funga characteristic of drier, low-rainfall environments.
