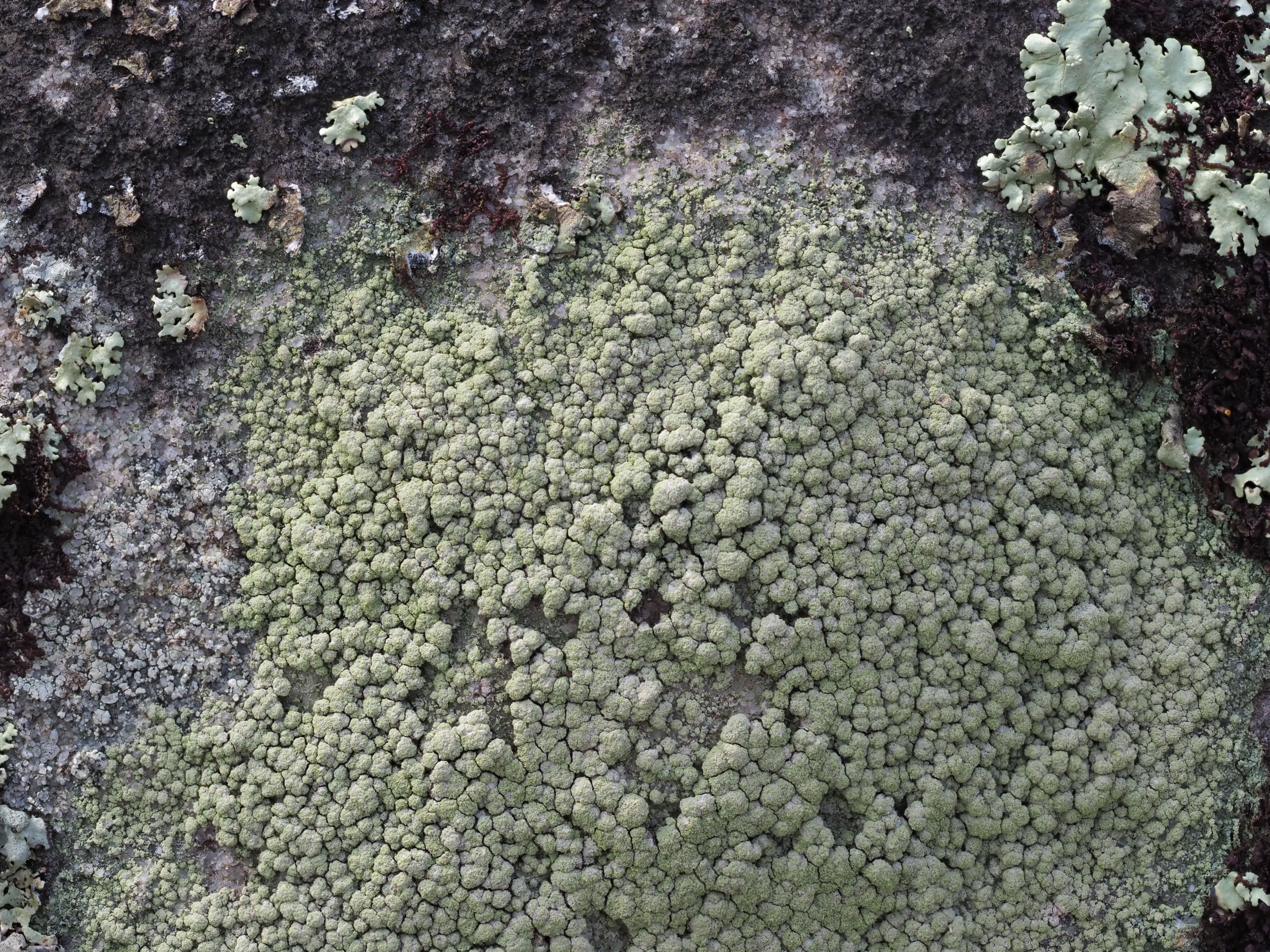
- In Oak Mountain State Park, Alabama

Scientific classification
- Kingdom: Fungi
- Division: Ascomycota
- Class: Lecanoromycetes
- Order: Umbilicariales
- Family: Fuscideaceae
- Genus: Fuscidea
- Species: F. appalachensis

Binomial name
- Fuscidea appalachensis Fryday (2008)

= Fuscidea appalachensis =

Species of lichen-forming fungus

Fuscidea appalachensis is a species of saxicolous (rock-dwelling) lichen in the family Fuscideaceae. Found in North America, it was formally described as a new species in 2008 by lichenologist Alan Fryday. The type specimen was collected from top of Tabor Gully in Baxter State Park (Maine) at an elevation of 1,415 m (4,642 ft). Here it was found growing on damp rocks on the side of the gully. The pale grey crustose thalli of Fuscidea appalachensis are 1–2 cm (0.4–0.8 in) in diameter, although neighbouring lichens may coalesce to form larger thalli. The lichen contains divaricatic acid, a secondary compound that can be detected using thin-layer chromatography. The specific epithet alludes to the range of the lichen—the Appalachian Mountains in eastern North America, ranging from New Brunswick to Tennessee at the southern end.
