= Fuscidea arboricola =

Scientific classification
- Kingdom: Fungi
- Division: Ascomycota
- Class: Lecanoromycetes
- Order: Umbilicariales
- Family: Fuscideaceae
- Genus: Fuscidea
- Species: F. arboricola

Binomial name
- Fuscidea arboricola Coppins & Tønsberg (1992)

Species of lichen-forming fungus

Fuscidea arboricola is a species of crustose lichen-forming fungus in the family Fuscideaceae. It was described in 1992 from material collected in Norway. The thallus forms small greyish to brownish patches on acidic bark, typically reproducing by pale green soredia (powdery vegetative propagules) rather than by ascospores. The species occurs in moist forests across Europe, Macaronesia, and eastern North America.

== Taxonomy ==
Fuscidea arboricola was described in 1992 by Brian Coppins and Tor Tønsberg from material collected in Nordland, Norway, where the type specimen was found on the trunk of Betula pubescens. Tønsberg placed the species in the Fuscidea cyathoides group because of its medially constricted spores and well-developed apothecial margin. In his revision of North American species of Fuscidea, Alan Fryday accepted it as a distinct species and noted that several earlier eastern North American collections had been misidentified as Fuscidea lightfootii.

== Description ==
The thallus is crustose and usually broken into small greyish-, greenish-, or brownish areoles surrounded by a distinct brown prothallus, often giving the lichen an overall brownish appearance. It may form rosettes up to 3 (rarely up to 5) cm across, though neighbouring thalli can merge into larger irregular patches. The soralia are pale yellowish green to pale green, sometimes brown-tinged, and are usually discrete rather than forming a continuous powdery crust; the soredia are fine, mostly 20–30 micrometres (μm) in diameter. Apothecia (fruiting bodies) are uncommon, but when present they are dark brown to brownish black, up to 0.8 mm wide, and often develop a flexuose margin. The ascospores are simple or occasionally have a single septum (1-septate), usually with a distinct median constriction, and measure 7–9 × 4–5 μm. Pycnidia are also uncommon; they are blackish brown and produce narrowly obovoid to somewhat rod-shaped (bacilliform) conidia measuring 3–3.5 × 1–1.5 μm. Chemically, the species contains fumarprotocetraric acid, sometimes with traces of protocetraric acid and cph-2. It is the only species of Fuscidea known to contain fumarprotocetraric acid.

== Similar species ==
Fuscidea arboricola can be confused with several related or superficially similar crustose lichens. It belongs to the F. cyathoides species group, but F. cyathoides usually has a non-sorediate thallus and more distinctly bean-shaped spores, whereas F. arboricola has a sorediate thallus and spores that are often constricted at the middle. It also resembles F. lightfootii in having a sorediate thallus, but that species contains divaricatic acid rather than fumarprotocetraric acid, and its spores are usually simple and often curved. Fuscidea praeruptorum is another similar species, especially in thallus form, but it contains alectorialic acid and is chiefly saxicolous, typically occurring on shaded rock overhangs rather than on bark. When sterile, F. arboricola may also resemble Lecanora conizaeoides, although its distinct brown prothallus usually helps to distinguish it.

== Habitat and distribution ==
Fuscidea arboricola is a bark-dwelling (corticolous) species of moist forests and other humid habitats, growing on bark, especially acidic bark. Its wider distribution encompasses Europe, Macaronesia, and North America.

The species was first described from Norway, where Tønsberg characterized it as mainly a lowland coastal species ranging from near sea level to 600 m, though inland it also occurred in microclimatically moist sites such as shaded spruce forests. Norwegian collections were most often from Alnus incana, Betula pubescens or B. pendula, and Sorbus aucuparia, but the species was also recorded from a range of other trees and shrubs, including Acer platanoides, Juniperus communis, Pinus sylvestris, Picea abies, Quercus, and Tilia. The original publication also reported it from Sweden and Scotland. Elsewhere in Europe, F. arboricola appears to be uncommon. The first confirmed record for Switzerland came from the Prealps of the canton of Lucerne, where it was collected on Fagus sylvatica at 1,058 m. In Slovenia it has been recorded from the Pohorje mountains on Abies alba at about 1,060 m; the species had previously been known in the country from only one locality in the southern Julian Alps, and in Austria it had been reported only from neighbouring Carinthia. In Belarus, it was reported as new to the country from the Gomel region, where it was collected on Pinus sylvestris in a middle-aged, well-lit pine forest. In that region, the species usually grows on Pinus sylvestris, and more occasionally on Betula and Alnus.

In Asia, F. arboricola was reported in 2012 from the Central Siberia Nature Reserve in Krasnoyarsk Krai, representing its first published record from the Asian part of Russia; that specimen was collected in birch large-grassy forest on the bark of Duschekia fruticosa. It has also been reported from the Baikal Nature Reserve in the Khamar-Daban Range of Buryatia, where it was collected on the bark of Abies sibirica in Pinus sibirica–Abies sibirica forest at 670 m.

In North America, it is a frequent species with an Appalachian–Great Lakes distribution, recorded from eastern Canada and the northeastern United States south to North Carolina and West Virginia.
