= Fuscidea aleutica =

Scientific classification
- Kingdom: Fungi
- Division: Ascomycota
- Class: Lecanoromycetes
- Order: Umbilicariales
- Family: Fuscideaceae
- Genus: Fuscidea
- Species: F. aleutica

Binomial name
- Fuscidea aleutica (Degel.) Fryday (2008)

Synonyms
- Lecidea aleutica Degel. (1938)

Species of lichen-forming fungus

Fuscidea aleutica is a species of saxicolous (rock-dwelling) crustose lichen-forming fungus in the family Fuscideaceae. Originally described in 1938 from the Aleutian Islands as a species of Lecidea, it was transferred to Fuscidea in 2008. It forms a thin brown thallus on coastal rocks in northwestern North America, where it is known from Alaska and British Columbia.

== Taxonomy ==
This species was originally described by Gunnar Degelius in 1938 as Lecidea aleutica from material collected on Unalaska Island in the Aleutian Islands. In his 2008 revision of North American Fuscidea, Alan Fryday transferred it to Fuscidea and treated it as a distinct species rather than as a synonym of F. lowensis. Fryday separated F. aleutica from F. lowensis by its thinner, cracked-areolate thallus, flatter adnate fruiting bodies with a persistent margin, and anatomical differences in the exciple and paraphyses; he also noted that the two species differ in both distribution and ecology. He regarded F. aleutica as very similar to F. thomsonii, but kept them separate because collections from the Haida Gwaii showed the two remaining distinct when they occurred together.

== Description ==
Fuscidea aleutica forms a thin, brown, crustose thallus broken into small cracked areoles, usually with a thin black prothallus between adjacent thalli. Its medulla is amyloid and stains violet with iodine. The apothecia (fruiting bodies) are black, flat, and usually adnate, about 0.3–0.5 mm in diameter, with a persistent, slightly raised margin. Microscopically, the species has cylindrical to slightly club-shaped asci and simple, colorless ascospores that are roughly spherical to broadly ellipsoid, measuring about 8–10 by 6–7 μm. The thallus contains divaricatic acid; correspondingly, standard spot tests are negative with K, C, and Pd, while the medulla is UV+ (white).

== Similar species ==
Fuscidea aleutica is most similar to F. thomsonii, another North American species with a thin thallus, an amyloid medulla, and adnate apothecia. F. aleutica is distinguished by its brown thallus, more sessile apothecia, a better-developed exciple, and darker pigmentation of the exciple and paraphyses; unlike F. thomsonii, it also lacks the pale ring around the inner margin of the apothecia. Although Fryday noted that the two species are very close and may even prove to be environmentally modified forms of a single taxon, he retained them as distinct because they remain separate where they grow together. Fuscidea aleutica also differs from F. lowensis, which has a thicker areolate thallus and convex, immarginate apothecia, and from F. submollis, which has a thicker thallus, apothecia about twice as large, shorter asci, and somewhat narrower ascospores.

== Habitat and distribution ==
Fuscidea aleutica is a rock-dwelling coastal species of northwestern North America. Fryday reported it from the type collection on Unalaska Island in the Aleutian Islands of Alaska and from three collections on Haida Gwaii, and suggested that it is probably more widespread along the northwestern coast than records indicate. The British Columbia material was collected on rocks in maritime settings, including shoreline boulders, exposed cliffs, and rocks beside a stream, indicating that the species occupies coastal rocky habitats.
