= Fuscidea muskeg =

Scientific classification
- Domain: Eukaryota
- Kingdom: Fungi
- Division: Ascomycota
- Class: Lecanoromycetes
- Order: Umbilicariales
- Family: Fuscideaceae
- Genus: Fuscidea
- Species: F. muskeg

Binomial name
- Fuscidea muskeg Tønsberg & M.Zahradn. (2020)

Species of lichen

Fuscidea muskeg is a species of crustose lichen in the family Fuscideaceae. Found in Alaska, it was described as a new species in 2020 by Tor Tønsberg and Martina Zahradníková. The type species was collected in the Hoonah-Angoon Census Area of Glacier Bay National Park. Here it was found growing on a branch of the tree Pinus contorta in muskeg. The specific epithet muskeg is an Algonquin word for a blanket bog.

== Description ==
Fuscidea muskeg has a crust-like thallus that grows on bark. It forms rounded patches up to a few centimeters in diameter and 0.5 mm thick. The patches are made of discrete, convex areoles measuring 0.12–0.20 mm (0.005–0.008 in) in diameter, with a color ranging from pale greenish to greenish with a yellowish tinge. The areoles eventually burst at the top and form soralia. The soralia are initially discrete, but aggregate later, and in some instances form a granular layer throughout the thallus surface.

The photobiont partner of Fuscidea muskeg is trebouxioid – a spherical, one-celled green alga. They measure from 8 to 18 μm in diameter (usually between 11 and 15). The results of standard lichen spot tests are thallus PD+ (yellow), and C+ (red). The lichen contains alectorialic acid.

Fuscidea praeruptorum is similar in appearance to F. muskeg but has somewhat longer ascospores (9.5–12 μm compared to 7–10 μm in F. muskeg), and it grows on rocks rather than on bark.
