= Fuscidea asbolodes =

Scientific classification
- Kingdom: Fungi
- Division: Ascomycota
- Class: Lecanoromycetes
- Order: Umbilicariales
- Family: Fuscideaceae
- Genus: Fuscidea
- Species: F. asbolodes

Binomial name
- Fuscidea asbolodes (Nyl.) Hertel & V.Wirth (1984)

Synonyms
- Lecidea asbolodes Nyl. (1876); Fuscidea absolodes (Nyl.) Hertel & V.Wirth (1984)

Species of lichen-forming fungus

Fuscidea asbolodes is a species of saxicolous (rock-dwelling) crustose lichen-forming fungus in the family Fuscideaceae. Originally described in 1876 from the Kerguelen Islands, it has a thin, crust-like thallus that is usually pale greyish to brownish grey. The species is widespread in the Subantarctic, with records from several island groups and the South Island of New Zealand.

== Taxonomy ==
Fuscidea asbolodes was first formally described by William Nylander in 1876, as Lecidea asbolodes. The type specimens were collected from the Kerguelen Islands. Nylander described it as a saxicolous lichen with a thin, sooty thallus, small black margined apothecia, shortly ellipsoid spores, and slender paraphyses, and noted its close resemblance to Lecidea leiotea (now known as Amandinea pelidna), which he said differed in having immarginate apothecia and thicker paraphyses. Hannes Hertel and Volkmar Wirth reclassified the species in Fuscidea in 1984.

== Description ==
Fuscidea asbolodes has a thin, crust-like thallus that may be rather indistinct, and is usually pale greyish to brownish grey. The thallus is about 100–200 micrometres (μm) thick and contains no lichen products detectable by chemical analysis. Its apothecia (fruiting bodies) are small, black, and usually semi-immersed, with discs that are rounded but often somewhat irregular or angular, and are typically about 0.3–0.6 mm wide. The asci are more or less cylindrical, and the ascospores are broadly ellipsoid to almost spherical, measuring about 9–12 by 6–9 μm. In Tasmanian specimens, the inner rim of the apothecia may be faintly dusted with a white pruina, although the importance of this feature is uncertain.

== Habitat and distribution ==
Fuscidea asbolodes is a rock-dwelling species that appears to be widespread in the Subantarctic. It has been recorded from Marion Prince Edward Islands, Heard Island, the Kerguelen Islands, Macquarie Island, the Auckland Islands, and the South Island of New Zealand. In Tasmania, however, it seems to be much less certain and far less frequently collected. Material once referred to this species there was later considered to belong to the closely related Fuscidea subasbolodes, and F. asbolodes in the strict sense has been confirmed in Tasmania from only two collections.
