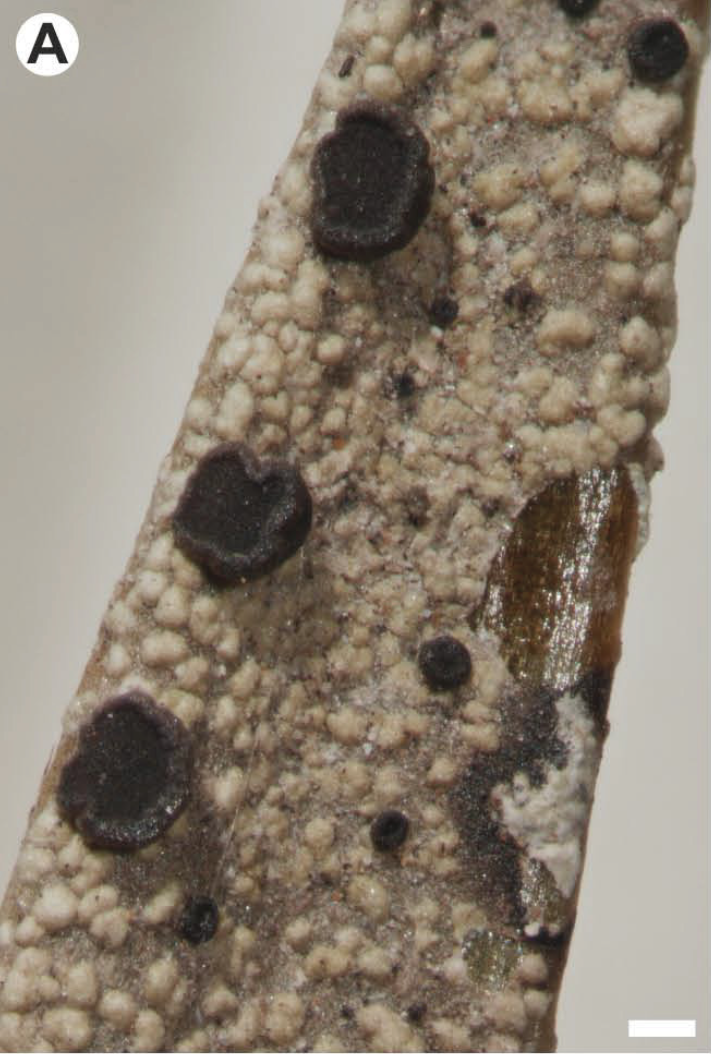
- Image of holotype, showing black apothecia, verruculose (warty) thallus and black prothallus. Scale bar = 250 μm

Scientific classification
- Kingdom: Fungi
- Division: Ascomycota
- Class: Lecanoromycetes
- Order: Umbilicariales
- Family: Fuscideaceae
- Genus: Fuscidea
- Species: F. multispora

Binomial name
- Fuscidea multispora Flakus, Kukwa & Rodr.Flakus (2019)

= Fuscidea multispora =

Species of lichen-forming fungus

Fuscidea multispora is a species of foliicolous (leaf-dwelling), crustose lichen in the family Fuscideaceae. Found in Bolivia, it is known to occur only in a single high-altitude locality in a national park, where it grows on the leaves of coniferous trees from the genus Podocarpus.

== Taxonomy ==
The lichen was formally described as a new species in 2019 by Adam Flakus, Martin Kukwa, and Pamela Rodriguez-Flakus. The type specimen was collected from Carrasco National Park (Cochabamba Department) at an altitude of 3,283 m (10,771 ft); here, it was found by the first author growing on the leaves of a Podocarpus tree. It is only known to occur at the type locality, which is Andean forest dominated by Podocarpus and Polylepis trees.

== Description ==
The lichen has a greyish-green to brownish thallus with a verruculose surface texture (as if covered with tiny warts); it reaches a diameter of 3–6 mm (0.12–0.24 in). The prothallus is black. Apothecia are dark brown to black with a round outline, measuring 0.2–0.6 mm in diameter; they have a matte, dark brown to black disk that is flat to somewhat concave. The excipulum (the apothecial margin) is the same color as the disk, and measures 40–80 μm wide. The ascospores typically have dimensions in the range 7–8.5 by 3.5–4.5 μm. Fuscidea multispora contains sekikaic acid, which is a lichen product that can be detected using thin-layer chromatography. The species epithet multispora makes reference to the multispored asci, which hold 16 ascospores.
