= Fuscidea texana =

Scientific classification
- Domain: Eukaryota
- Kingdom: Fungi
- Division: Ascomycota
- Class: Lecanoromycetes
- Order: Umbilicariales
- Family: Fuscideaceae
- Genus: Fuscidea
- Species: F. texana

Binomial name
- Fuscidea texana Fryday (2008)

Species of lichen

Fuscidea texana is a species of saxicolous (rock-dwelling), crustose lichen in the family Fuscideaceae. Found in the United States, it was formally described as a new species in 2008 by lichenologist Alan Fryday. The type specimen was collected by Clifford Wetmore from the north slope of Emory Peak in Big Bend National Park (Texas) at an elevation of 6,300 ft (1,900 m). The pale pinkish-grey areolate thalli of Fuscidea texana are up to 5 cm (2 in) in diameter, and have a distinct margin. Its ascospores are thick-walled and measure 8–9 by 4.5–5.5 μm. The lichen contains norstictic acid, a secondary compound. Fuscidea texana is only known from the original type collection, dating from 1970. The specific epithet refers to its type locality.
