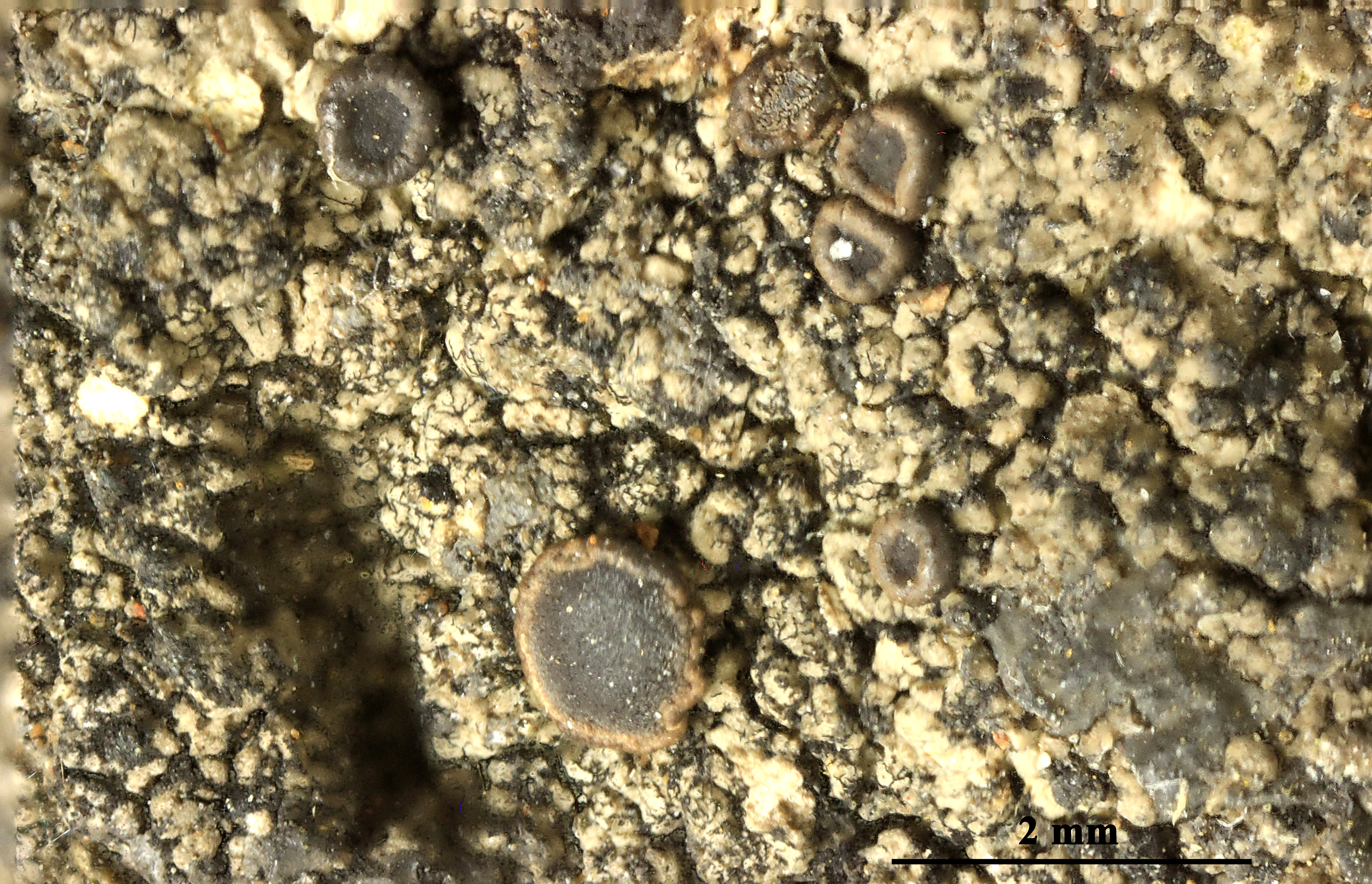
- Closeup of thallus and fruiting bodies; scale: 2 mm

Scientific classification
- Kingdom: Fungi
- Division: Ascomycota
- Class: Lecanoromycetes
- Order: Umbilicariales
- Family: Fuscideaceae
- Genus: Fuscidea
- Species: F. austera

Binomial name
- Fuscidea austera (Nyl.) P.James (1980)

Synonyms
- List: Lecanora austera Nyl. (1874); Lecidea contigua b aggregata Flot. (1828); Lecidea aggregata (Flot.) H.Magn. (1925); Fuscidea aggregata (Flot.) V.Wirth & Vězda (1972); Lecidea taeniarum Malme (1919); Fuscidea taeniarum (Malme) V.Wirth & Vězda (1972); Lecidea aggregatilis Grummann (1963); Fuscidea aggregatilis (Grummann) V.Wirth & Vězda (1976)

= Fuscidea austera =

Species of lichen-forming fungus

Fuscidea austera is a species of lichen-forming fungus in the family Fuscideaceae. Originally described in 1874 from specimens collected in Scotland and placed in genus Lecanora, it was reclassified in Fuscidea in 1980. The thallus is pale grey to chocolate-brown and cracked into small patches (areoles), with blackish-brown apothecia (fruiting bodies) up to 2 mm wide. The species grows on sheltered siliceous rock faces in the British Isles and has also been recorded from several countries in continental Europe and from Korea.

== Taxonomy ==
This species was originally described by William Nylander as Lecanora austera in 1874. In his original account, Nylander described it from material collected in Scotland on quartzose rock in sandy alpine habitat at Ben Cruachan, and noted its uneven, cracked brown thallus, dark brown apothecia, and ellipsoid spores. In 1980, Peter James transferred it to the genus Fuscidea, establishing the new combination Fuscidea austera. Synonyms include Fuscidea aggregata, Fuscidea aggregatilis, and Fuscidea taeniarum.

In molecular phylogenetic studies of European Fuscidea, Fuscidea austera was included in analyses of various genetic markers (ITS, LSU rRNA, and mtSSU sequences), which placed it near Fuscidea kochiana within a small clade of related species.

== Description ==
The thallus of Fuscidea austera is pale grey to chocolate-brown and broken into a cracked surface of small, closely adjoining areoles about 0.2–0.5 mm in diameter. These areoles are thin and fairly even to somewhat irregular in shape, and may be slightly convex or somewhat warty in appearance. A black prothallus is usually present at the margin, helping to define the edge of the thallus. The apothecia (fruiting bodies) are sessile and 0.5–2 mm wide, with rounded to irregular outlines; they may occur singly or in clusters. Their disc is dull blackish brown, turning reddish brown when wet, and is usually flat, sometimes with a light dusting of pruina. The apothecial margin (the true exciple), is brown, often paler than the disc and sometimes patchy in colour, and remains persistent as it becomes strongly uneven or lobed. The ascospores are broadly ellipsoid, single-celled (aseptate), and usually 9–11 by 6.5–8 μm. Pycnidia are about 0.15 mm in diameter and are blackish brown around the ostiole. In standard chemical spot tests the thallus is negative for C, K, KC, and Pd, but it fluoresces bluish white under ultraviolet light; divaricatic acid is confined to the apothecia.

== Habitat and distribution ==
Fuscidea austera grows on sheltered, vertical siliceous rock faces, where it can form extensive mosaic-like patches. In the British Isles, it is a local species known from the Highlands of northern Scotland and from Snowdonia in Wales. It is rare in England, where it occurs especially on the coarse-grained sandstone known as Millstone Grit.

Outside the British Isles, Fuscidea austera has also been reported from Austria, Czech Republic, Hungary, and Switzerland. In 2014, it was recorded from the Polonyna Bukovs'ka ridge in Uzh National Nature Park, and that publication treated it as a new record for the lichen biota of Ukraine. It has also been documented in northern Europe, in the subalpine and alpine belts of Central European mountains, and in Korea.
