= Niebla suffnessii =

Scientific classification
- Kingdom: Fungi
- Division: Ascomycota
- Class: Lecanoromycetes
- Order: Lecanorales
- Family: Ramalinaceae
- Genus: Niebla
- Species: N. suffnessii

Binomial name
- Niebla suffnessii Spjut (1996)

Species of lichen

Niebla suffnessii is a fruticose lichen that grows on rocks along the foggy Pacific Coast of North America within the Vizcaíno Desert region of Baja California. The epithet, suffnessii, is in honor of Matthew Suffness who was Chief of the Natural Products Branch in the National Cancer Institute during the late 1970s to mid 1980s, and later a coordinator of the National Institutes of Health (NIH) contracts for the drug discovery groups, and who also encouraged the screening of lichens and bryophytes in the search for new anticancer drugs.

== Distinguishing features ==
Niebla suffnessii is distinguished by a thallus divided into yellowish green subtubular branches from a pale reddish orange pigmented holdfast; the branches inflated near base in the typical form, generally linear in outline, to 8 cm long and 1–4 mm wide, frequently dichotomously or trichotomously divided from near base, the branches ultimately long and whip-like. The species (N. suffnessii) is further distinguished by the relatively thin cortex, 35–75(-100) μm thick, which is typically smooth with longitudinal ridges coinciding with the branch margins, occasionally twisting up the branch, appearing more prominently reticulate on terminal branches, or in other thalli, the cortical ridges conspicuous from near base. The latter may represent hybrids with Niebla siphonoloba on mesa above Arroyo San Andrés and north of Punta Canoas on Mesa Camacho. The species (N. siphonoloba) also distinguished by containing the lichen substance sekikaic acid, with triterepenes Similar species are Niebla turgida that has divaricatic acid instead of sekikaic acid, and Niebla fimbriata that differs by the dark green thicker cortex, 100–150(-200) μm thick, and by the one-sided development of secondary branches that easily break off where they attach to the primary branch.

== Taxonomic history ==
Niebla suffnessii was recognized as a result of undertaking a taxonomic revision of the genus in regard to developing a lichen flora of Baja California, which began in 1986. It was first collected on the Vizcaino Peninsula on Cerro Elefante, 15 May 1986, the holotype (biology), Spjut 9567B, deposited in the United States National Herbarium (Smithsonian Institution, Museum of Natural History, Botany Department) and at the Universidad Autónoma de Baja California, Ensenada, Mexico. It was the only Niebla on the cinder cone. The species (N. suffnessii) was subsequently found on a mesa above Arroyo San Andrés with several other species that contain sekikaic acid, Niebla lobulata, Niebla siphonoloba, and Niebla usneoides, around Bahía Santa María, and on mesas north of Punta Canoas with Niebla siphonoloba, Niebla marinii, and other related species. At this northern location it may prove to be another species that could be recognized by the sharply raised cortical ridges.

Niebla suffnessii has also been interpreted to belong to a broad species concept of Niebla homalea; one that recognizes only three species in the genus, two by the medulla reaction to para-phenylenediamine, depsidones (pd+, Niebla josecuervoi), depsides (pd-, Niebla homalea). and one by isidia (isidium) (Niebla isidiaescens), based on the genus concept defined by Spjut; however, the taxonomic treatment for the broad species concept has many inconsistencies.
