= Maronora =

Scientific classification
- Domain: Eukaryota
- Kingdom: Fungi
- Division: Ascomycota
- Class: Lecanoromycetes
- Order: Umbilicariales
- Family: Fuscideaceae
- Genus: Maronora; Kalb & Aptroot (2018)
- Species: M. cyanosora

Binomial name
- Maronora cyanosora Kalb & Aptroot (2018)

Species of lichen

Maronora is a monotypic fungal genus in the family Fuscideaceae. It contains the single species Maronora cyanosora, a corticolous (bark-dwelling) lichen. It is characterised by its distinctive bluish-grey circular soralia on the thallus, Lecanora-like apothecia, and simple, hyaline ascospores.

== Taxonomy ==
Maronora cyanosora was initially identified and named by lichenologists Klaus Kalb and André Aptroot in 2018. The genus name, Maronora, is a combination of the names of two genera: Maronina, which shares a similar ascus type, and Lecanora, which bears a similar appearance. The specific epithet, cyanosora, refers to the striking bluish-grey colour of the soredia. The type specimen was collected by the first author in Brazil, precisely between Feira de Santana and Milagres in Bahia. It was found on the bark of trees in the Caatinga, a unique habitat found in Brazil.

Maronora cyanosora bears some resemblance to certain corticolous species of Lecanora that have dark hypothecia, as noted by H. Thorsten Lumbsch and colleagues. However, it stands out due to its unique hypothecium chemistry, characterized by a blood-red solution when treated with KOH. This distinctive feature sets it apart from other species. Furthermore, the ascus tip of Maronora cyanosora shows similarities to the Fuscidea-type, further supporting its placement in a separate genus within the Fuscideaceae family.

== Description ==
The thallus of Maronora cyanosora has a pale ochraceous-white colour, minute rimose structure, and thin cortex, measuring up to 0.1 mm in thickness. It is surrounded by a blackish prothallus line, approximately 0.1 mm wide. Soralia, which are sessile and predominantly punctiform to circular, has a striking bluish-grey colour and a powdery texture. With age, the soralia tend to merge, forming larger patches. The photobiont, which forms a symbiotic relationship with the fungus, is chlorococcoid and measures around 5–10 μm in diameter.

Apothecia are relatively rare in Maronora cyanosora. They are sessile and typically not constricted at their bases, having a round shape with diameters ranging from 0.3 to 0.7 mm. The disc of the apothecia appears flat, dull, and dark chocolate brown without any powdery coating (pruina). The margin, pale ochraceous white, does not rise above the level of the disc. Over time, it may become partially covered by bluish-grey soredia, approximately 0.15 mm wide. The hymenium is hyaline. The epithecium, when treated with a solution of KOH, shows a brown colour due to dissolving tiny crystals. The paraphysis tips remain dark brown and unaffected by KOH treatment. In contrast, the hypothecium turns dark brown, releasing a blood-red solution when exposed to KOH. The excipulum, comprising the outermost layer of the apothecium, contains large hyaline crystals. The ascus, resembling the Fuscidea-type, consists of an outer amyloid surface and an amyloid inner hollow long conical part, containing 4–6 ascospores. The ascospores themselves are hyaline, lack septa, broadly ellipsoid, and have rounded ends, measuring 8–9 μm by 6.5–7 μm. Pycnidia, another type of reproductive structure, have not been observed in this species.

Through thin-layer chromatography, the major compound identified is atranorin, accompanied by at least five unidentified aliphatic acids as submajor components. Additionally, the hypothecium contains an unidentified anthraquinone, likely boryquinone.

== Habitat and distribution ==
Maronora cyanosora is found exclusively on tree bark in the Caatinga, an ecoregion of semi-arid tropical vegetation in Brazil. At the time of its publication, this species was known only from Brazil, specifically recorded in the states of Bahia and Rio Grande do Sul. It has a localized distribution within the Caatinga forest of Bahia, where it is relatively common, but a collection from Rio Grande do Sul suggests that its distribution in Brazil could be more widespread.
