= Xanthoparmelia kleinswartbergensis =

Scientific classification
- Domain: Eukaryota
- Kingdom: Fungi
- Division: Ascomycota
- Class: Lecanoromycetes
- Order: Lecanorales
- Family: Parmeliaceae
- Genus: Xanthoparmelia
- Species: X. kleinswartbergensis

Binomial name
- Xanthoparmelia kleinswartbergensis Elix (2002)

Species of lichen

Xanthoparmelia kleinswartbergensis is a species of saxicolous (rock-dwelling), foliose lichen in the family Parmeliaceae. Found in South Africa, it was formally described as a new species in 2002 by Australian lichenologist John Elix. The type specimen was collected from Klein Swartberg (Cape Province), where it was found growing on large boulders in a gorge. It contains protocetraric acid as a major lichen product, minor amounts of usnic acid and anhydrofusarubin lactol, and trace amounts of anhydrofusarubin lactol methyl ketal. The species epithet refers to the type locality, the only place the lichen is known to occur.

== See also ==
- List of Xanthoparmelia species
