= Xanthoparmelia alligatensis =

Scientific classification
- Kingdom: Fungi
- Division: Ascomycota
- Class: Lecanoromycetes
- Order: Lecanorales
- Family: Parmeliaceae
- Genus: Xanthoparmelia
- Species: X. alligatensis

Binomial name
- Xanthoparmelia alligatensis Elix (2006)
- Holotype: Mount Remarkable National Park, South Australia

Species of lichen

Xanthoparmelia alligatensis is a species of saxicolous (rock-dwelling), foliose lichen in the family Parmeliaceae, described by John Elix in 2006. The species is native to South Australia, specifically found in the Mount Remarkable National Park.

== Taxonomy ==
Xanthoparmelia alligatensis was formally described by John Elix in 2006. The type specimen was collected in Australia within the Mount Remarkable National Park at Alligator Gorge, located 9 km south of Wilmington, South Australia, at an elevation of 600 metres. The specimen was collected on 17 May 2003 from sandstone rocks amidst Eucalyptus woodland accompanied by Allocasuarina, Callitris, Acacia, and Xanthorrhoea.

The specific epithet alligatensis is derived from the Latin suffix ensis, meaning "place of origin", combined with "Alligator", referencing Alligator Gorge, the type locality where the species was first identified.

== Description ==
The thallus of Xanthoparmelia alligatensis is foliose, loosely adnate to the substrate, and can reach up to 8 cm in diameter. Its lobes are separate to slightly overlapping (imbricate), measuring 1.5–3.5 mm in width, with more or less linear to somewhat irregular shapes that can form subdichotomous branches. The lobe tips can be either more or less round or incised.

The upper surface of the thallus is initially grey to grey-green and darkens as it ages, becoming flat to weakly convoluted, dull, and rugose in the centre while remaining shiny and black-margined at the lobe tips. The surface lacks soredia and isidia, which are structures involved in reproduction and dispersal.

The lower surface is smooth, ranging from ivory to brown, and darker towards the lobe tips. Rhizines (root-like structures beneath the lichen) are sparse, short, slender, and colour-coordinated with the lower surface.

Reproductive structures are limited to somewhat stipitate apothecia (fruiting bodies), which are 1–7 mm wide, with a mid-brown to dark brown disc. The lichen produces ellipsoidal ascospores measuring 9–12 by 5–6 μm.

== Chemistry ==
Xanthoparmelia alligatensis has no reaction to potassium hydroxide solution (K−) on the cortex, and a KC + (rose) reaction on the medulla, indicating the presence of isousnic acid as a major lichen product, alongside norlobaridone and minor quantities of various scabrosin derivatives.

== Habitat and distribution ==
This lichen is found exclusively in the Mount Remarkable National Park, particularly around Alligator Gorge. It grows on sandstone surfaces within Eucalyptus woodlands, often accompanied by shrubby vegetation such as Allocasuarina, Callitris, Acacia, and Xanthorrhoea.

== See also ==
- List of Xanthoparmelia species
