= Elixia (lichen) =

Scientific classification
- Domain: Eukaryota
- Kingdom: Fungi
- Division: Ascomycota
- Class: Lecanoromycetes
- Order: Umbilicariales
- Family: Elixiaceae
- Genus: Elixia; Lumbsch (1997)

Type species
- Elixia flexella (Ach.) Lumbsch (1997)

Species
- E. cretica E. flexella

Genus of lichens

Elixia is a genus of crustose lichens in the family Elixiaceae. It has two species:

- Elixia cretica T.Sprib. & Lumbsch (2010)
- Elixia flexella (Ach.) Lumbsch (1997)

The genus was circumscribed in 1997 by H. Thorsten Lumbsch. The genus name honours Australian lichenologist John Alan Elix.
