= Elixia cretica =

Scientific classification
- Domain: Eukaryota
- Kingdom: Fungi
- Division: Ascomycota
- Class: Lecanoromycetes
- Order: Umbilicariales
- Family: Elixiaceae
- Genus: Elixia
- Species: E. cretica

Binomial name
- Elixia cretica T.Sprib. & Lumbsch (2010)

Species of lichen

Elixia cretica is a rare species of corticolous (bark-dwelling), crustose lichen in the family Elixiaceae. It is only known to occur in a single location in the mountains of the Greek island of Crete.

== Taxonomy ==
The lichen was described as a new species in 2010 by lichenologists Toby Spribille and H. Thorsten Lumbsch. The type specimen was collected from Lefka Ori, a mountain range in Western Crete. The type locality is 3 km (1.9 mi) southwest of the village Omalos, between the mountains Mávri Kimite and Tourli, at an elevation of 1,125 m (3,691 ft). There, the first author found the lichen growing on the bark of Turkish pine (Pinus brutia), near the base of tree. It is only known from the type locality.

According to the authors, the lichen first "defied any attempt at identification" before an association with Elixia was made. Subsequent molecular phylogenetic analysis confirmed its placement in that genus, as the second species of Elixia, and only the third member of family Elixiaceae.

== Description ==
The brownish to greenish thallus of Elixia cretica is crustose, areolate, and thin (less than 50 μm thick); it lacks both soredia and isidia. It grows in the sheltered cracks of the bark. The ascomata of the lichen are in the shape of a lirella (an elongated, narrow apothecium) (lirelloid), measuring 0.5–1.4 mm in diameter with a black margin. Its ascospores, which number eight per ascus, are ellipsoid, colourless to faintly light brown, and have dimensions of 7.0–10.0 by 3.2–4.5 μm. No lichen products were detected in the lichen using thin-layer chromatography, and all of the standard chemical spot tests are negative.
