= Hueidea =

Scientific classification
- Kingdom: Fungi
- Division: Ascomycota
- Class: Lecanoromycetes
- Order: Teloschistales
- Family: Teloschistaceae
- Genus: Hueidea; Kantvilas & P.M.McCarthy (2003)

Type species
- Hueidea australiensis Kantvilas & P.M.McCarthy (2003)

Synonyms
- Huea C.W.Dodge & G.E.Baker (1938)

Genus of lichens

Hueidea is a fungal genus in the family Teloschistaceae. The type species is Hueidea australiensis, a saxicolous (rock-dwelling), crustose lichen found on granite rocks in the Mount Kosciuszko area of New South Wales, Australia. Both the species and the genus were described as new to science in 2003 by the Australian lichenologists Gintaras Kantvilas and Patrick McCarthy. An additional five species were added to the genus in 2024.

== Taxonomy ==
Hueidea was erected in 2003 by Gintaras Kantvilas and Patrick M. McCarthy to accommodate the alpine Australian endemic H. australiensis. On the basis of its thick-walled, lecideine (i.e., carbonised and lacking thalline margin) apothecia and the absence of anthraquinone pigments, the authors placed the genus in the family Fuscideaceae (Umbilicariales), albeit with some reservations. Their cautious assessment reflected the fact that no molecular data were then available.

Molecular analyses using various molecular markers published in 2024 demonstrated that Hueidea is actually nested within the Teloschistaceae, subfamily Caloplacoideae, where it forms a strongly supported clade that is sister to Lendemeriella. The same study revealed that the Antarctic genus Huea is congeneric with Hueidea. Huea, originally proposed in 1938, contained some anthraquinone-lacking Antarctic species with black apothecia featuring a carbonaceous (blackened) exciple and a bright blue epihymenium. Because the nomenclatural committee for fungi has since recommended formal rejection of Huea, Hueidea now provides the correct name for that lineage. Morphologically, members of the genus are united by lecideine apothecia whose exciple and epihymenium are impregnated with the insoluble emerald pigment cinereorufa-green; anthraquinones (the orange-red Teloschistaceae pigments) are present only in H. coeruleofrigida.

Following these findings, the circumscription of the genus was broadened to include five Antarctic and sub-Antarctic taxa formerly assigned to Huea—H. cerussata, H. grisea, H. coeruleofrigida, the sorediate H. sorediata, and the newly described Kerguelen endemic H. austroaquatica—bringing the genus to six accepted species. Numerous African and Indian-Ocean names that were historically transferred to Huea (e.g., H. albidocoerulescens, H. diphyella) are retained in their original combinations pending molecular and chemical study, as current evidence suggests they do not belong in Hueidea.

== Species ==
- Hueidea australiensis Kantvilas & P.M.McCarthy (2003)
- Hueidea austroaquatica Ertz & Søchting (2024)
- Hueidea cerussata (Hue) Søchting & Arup (2024)
- Hueidea coeruleofrigida (Søchting & Seppelt) Søchting & Arup (2024)
- Hueidea grisea (Vain.) Søchting & Arup (2024)
- Hueidea sorediata (Øvstedal) Søchting (2024)
