= Meridianelia =

Scientific classification
- Kingdom: Fungi
- Division: Ascomycota
- Class: Lecanoromycetes
- Order: Umbilicariales
- Family: Elixiaceae
- Genus: Meridianelia; Kantvilas & Lumbsch (2009)
- Species: M. maccarthyana

Binomial name
- Meridianelia maccarthyana Kantvilas & Lumbsch (2009)
- Holotype: near Lake Fenton, Tasmania

Single-species lichen genus

Meridianelia is a fungal genus in the family Elixiaceae. It consists of the single species Meridianelia maccarthyana, a corticolous (bark-dwelling), crustose lichen. This lichen forms greyish-white, crust-like growths on tree bark in subalpine woodlands of Tasmania, Australia. Discovered in 2003 and scientifically described in 2009, Meridianelia is classified in the small fungal family Elixiaceae based on its genetic and structural characteristics. The genus is notable for its unique reproductive structures and its apparent rarity, having been found in only a few locations despite growing in a relatively common type of forest.

== Taxonomy ==
The genus Meridianelia was circumscribed in 2009 by the lichenologists Gintaras Kantvilas and H. Thorsten Lumbsch based on collections from Tasmania, Australia. The type specimen (holotype) of Meridianelia maccarthyana was collected by Kantvilas on December 17, 2003. It was found 1 km southeast of Lake Fenton, Tasmania, at an elevation of 950 m (3,120 ft). The specimen was collected from the trunk of Eucalyptus coccifera in subalpine woodland. The genus name Meridianelia is derived from the Latin meridianus (meaning 'southern'), referring to its geographic distribution in Tasmania. It also alludes to the similarity of this lichen to members of the genus Trapelia. The species epithet honours the Australian lichenologist Patrick McCarthy.

Phylogenetic analysis of mitochondrial small subunit rDNA sequences showed that Meridianelia clusters strongly with Elixia flexella, one of the few representatives of the small fungal family Elixiaceae. This supported the placement of Meridianelia in Elixiaceae. The placement was further corroborated by the description of the third Elixiaceae species in 2010, Elixia cretica, which, together with E. flexella, formed a clade sister to Meridianelia. However, in some later (2018) phylogenetic analyses, the authors note that the current arrangement "was not significantly supported by any analyses", and that "Elixia monophyly was not supported, as Meridianelia grouped with accessions of E. flexella and Elixia sp. and excluded Elixia cretica."

While superficially similar to Trapelia in some morphological features, Meridianelia differs significantly in its ascus structure. The asci in Meridianelia have a prominent, weakly amyloid tholus with an intensely amyloid cap, characteristic of the Elixia-type ascus. This ascus structure, along with other anatomical and molecular evidence, justified the creation of a new genus separate from Elixia and Trapelia.

The addition of Meridianelia to Elixiaceae necessitated a recircumscription of the family to accommodate the morphological differences between the two genera. The family is now defined as lichenised ascomycetes with a crustose thallus containing a coccoid green photobiont, hemiangiocarpous apothecia, eight-spored Elixia-type asci, simple hyaline ascospores, and either aliphatic acids or no lichen substances.

== Description ==
Meridianelia is a lichen genus characterised by a crust-like, thin outer layer (thallus) that forms spreading colonies up to 10–20 cm wide. The thallus is dull greyish white, somewhat glossy, and 120–200 μm thick. Initially smooth, it develops small wart-like structures (verrucae) 0.5–1 mm wide, and may become worn, eroded, or develop powdery reproductive structures (soredia) over time. Like all lichens, Meridianelia is a symbiotic organism, containing a green algal partner (photobiont) with round to oval cells, 9–20 by 9–16 μm, typically clustered in bundles within the thallus.

The lichen's reproductive structures (apothecia) are disc-shaped and partially immersed in the thallus. These discs are roundish to irregularly angular, 0.3–1 mm wide, and generally clustered in groups of 2–3 (occasionally up to 5). The surface of the disc starts deeply concave, becoming flat to wavy, dark grey, and covered with a thick whitish powder-like coating (pruina). The apothecium is surrounded by a very thin layer of fungal tissue (excipulum), measuring up to about 10 μm thick, pale greyish green, composed of interwoven thread-like structures (hyphae).

Inside the apothecium is a colourless reproductive layer (hymenium), 160–200 μm thick, containing scattered oil droplets and topped by a grey-green layer 30–50 μm thick. Within this layer are spore-producing sacs (asci) and sterile filaments (paraphyses). The asci are elongated and club-shaped, 130–170 by 17–25 μm, containing 8 spores each. They have a specialised structure at the tip for releasing spores, resembling those found in the related genus Elixia. The paraphyses are very delicate, highly branched, and intertwined, 0.8–1 μm thick, with narrowed tips.

The spores are arranged in a single row within the ascus (uniseriate). They are thin-walled, without a gel coating, and round to oval in shape, typically measuring 14–23 by 9–20 μm, often containing a single, large bubble-like structure (vacuole). Chemically, the lichen contains protolichesterinic acid, but does not show any colour changes when tested with common lichen identification chemicals. Another type of reproductive structure common in lichens, pycnidia, has not been observed in this genus.

== Habitat and distribution ==
Meridianelia maccarthyana is known to occur only in Tasmania, Australia. It has been recorded in open subalpine woodland dominated by Eucalyptus coccifera, typically growing on dolerite boulder fields at elevations around 950–1010 metres above sea level. The species forms conspicuous white patches up to 20 cm wide on the lowermost 1–2 metres of eucalypt trunks, as well as on larger individuals of Olearia with loose, papery bark. It has also been found at the margins of Nothofagus cunninghamii-dominated cool temperate rainforest.

Meridianelia maccarthyana prefers sunny conditions and is most frequently found on trees where the understorey is sparse. It is absent in areas where undershrubs form a closed cover. Despite its conspicuous appearance where present, the species has been encountered infrequently, suggesting it may have specific ecological requirements that are not yet fully understood.

Associated lichen species in its habitat include Mycoblastus campbellianus, M. coniophorellus, Ochrolechia species, Pertusaria jamesii, P. pertractata, Pseudoramonia richeae, Ramboldia stuartii, Trapeliopsis granulosa, and Usnea oncodes. Below the "Meridianelia-zone" on eucalypt trunks, there is often a basal cover of bryophytes and species of Cladia and Cladonia.
