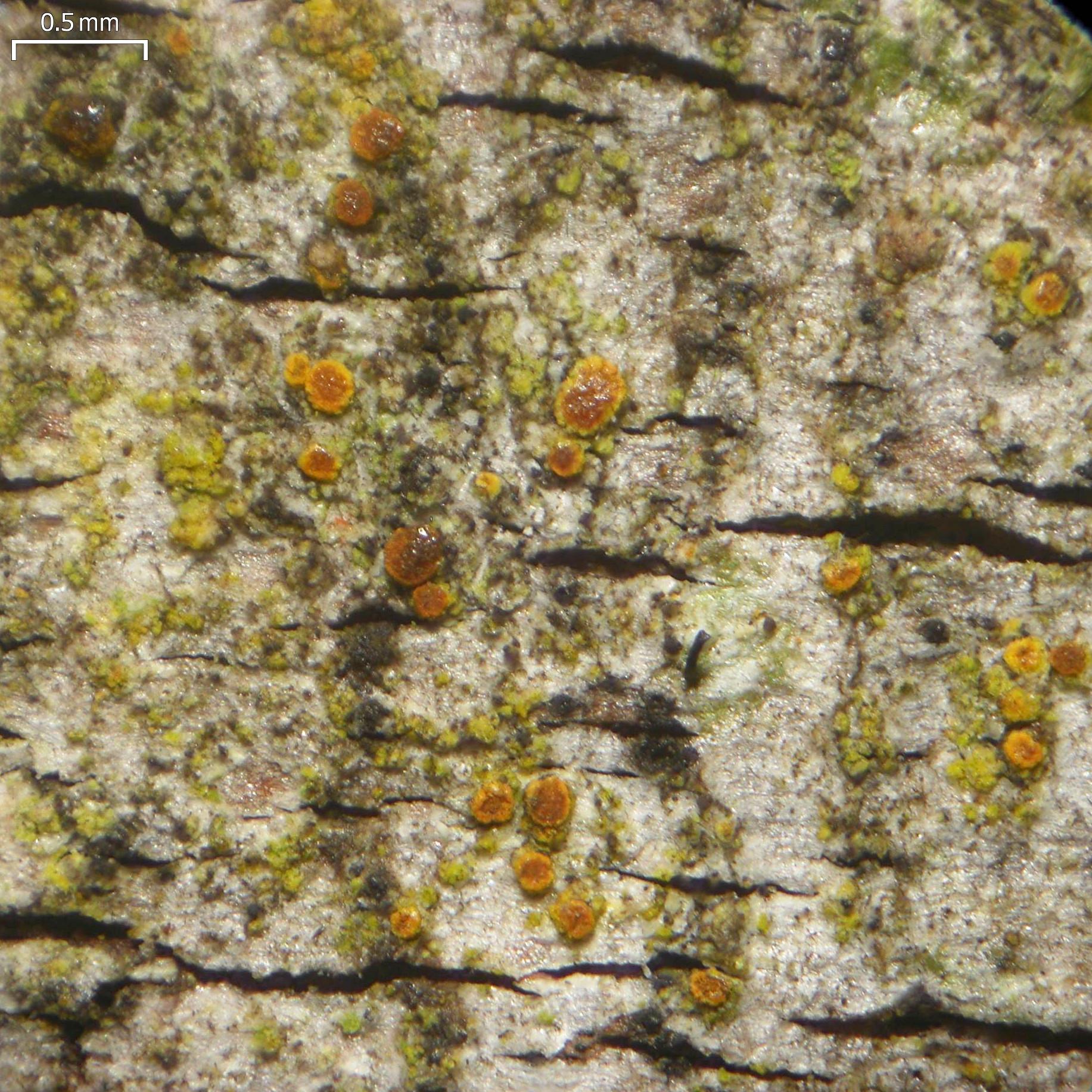
- Piccolia nannaria growing on the bark of red maple

Scientific classification
- Domain: Eukaryota
- Kingdom: Fungi
- Division: Ascomycota
- Class: Lecanoromycetes
- Order: incertae sedis
- Family: incertae sedis
- Genus: Piccolia; A.Massal. (1864)

Type species
- Piccolia crocea (Spreng.) A.Massal. (1856)

Species
- See text

Synonyms
- Biatorella De Not.

= Piccolia =

Genus of lichens

Piccolia is a small genus of crustose lichens in the class Lecanoromycetes. First circumscribed by Italian lichenologist Abramo Bartolommeo Massalongo in 1864, it contains ten species. Due to a lack of molecular data, it has not been assigned to an order or family.

== Taxonomy ==
Massalongo established the genus, which was initially monotypic, to contain the species Piccolia crocea. He named it for Gregorio Piccoli, an 18th-century naturalist he referred to as "the most eminent investigator of the natural world". In 1927, Alexander Zahlbruckner, an Austrian-Hungarian lichenologist, merged it into the genus Biatorella, based on the fact that they shared a number of characteristics: a crustose thallus, multi-spored asci (the lichen's spore-bearing cells) and apothecia that lack a thalline border. However, Austrian lichenologist Josef Hafellner separated the two genera out again in 1994, arguing that Biatorella had been rendered "highly heterogenous" by Zahlbruckner's designation.

=== Species ===
The genus Piccolia includes the following species:

- Piccolia congolensis Van den Broeck, Aptroot & Ertz (2013)
- Piccolia conspersa (Fée) Hafellner (1995)
- Piccolia crocea (Spreng.) A. Massal. (1856)
- Piccolia elmeri (Vain.) Hafellner (1995)
- Piccolia haematina (Müll. Arg.) Hafellner (1995)
- Piccolia kalbii Van den Broeck & Ertz (2013)
- Piccolia nannaria (Tuck.) Lendemer & Beeching (2007)
- Piccolia nivea Van den Broeck, Aptroot & Ertz (2013)
- Piccolia ochrophora (Nyl.) Hafellner (2004)
- Piccolia wrightii (Tuck.) Hafellner (1995)

== Distribution and ecology ==
While members of the genus are generally found in tropical or subtropical areas, the range of Piccolia conspersa extends into temperate regions, and Piccolia ochrophora is found in both North and South America as well as throughout Europe. Several are restricted to islands: Piccolia nivea to Santa Isabel Island in the Solomon Islands and Piccolia kalbii to Réunion. Most are corticolous or lignicolous, living on the bark of trees or stripped wood; some occur (though only rarely) on mosses. The photobiont is a chlorococcoid green alga.

Piccolia nannaria is a lichenicolous lichen, at least facultatively. It typically starts out growth as a free-living mycobiont and becomes lichenised with the photobiont of an unrelated lichen, in this case Pyrrhospora varians.
