= Astrothelium elixii =

Scientific classification
- Domain: Eukaryota
- Kingdom: Fungi
- Division: Ascomycota
- Class: Dothideomycetes
- Order: Trypetheliales
- Family: Trypetheliaceae
- Genus: Astrothelium
- Species: A. elixii

Binomial name
- Astrothelium elixii Flakus & Aptroot (2016)

Species of lichen

Astrothelium elixii is a rare species of corticolous (bark-dwelling) lichen in the family Trypetheliaceae. It is found in the Beni Biological Station Biosphere Reserve in Bolivia.

== Taxonomy ==
The lichen was formally described as a new species in 2016 by lichenologists Adam Flakus and André Aptroot. The type specimen was collected near the biological station in Beni Biological Station Biosphere Reserve (Yacuma Province); there, at an altitude of 175 m (574 ft), it was found on an island of lowland Amazon rainforest in Beni savanna. The species epithet honours Australian lichenologist John Alan Elix, "for his magnificent contribution to the knowledge of lichen chemistry".

== Description ==
The thallus of Astrothelium elixii has a smooth, greyish-green cortex, and measures about 0.2 mm thick and covers an area of roughly 6 cm (2.4 in) in diameter; it does not have a prothallus. It makes pear-shaped (pyriform) ascomata that measure 0.3–0.5 mm in diameter. These reproductive structures tend to aggregate together, and they are fully immersed in their containing pseudostromata. The point-like ostioles (pores) atop the ascomata are flat and black. The ascospores produced by A. elixii are narrowly ellipsoid to spindle-shaped (fusiform), measuring 70–150 by 17–32 μm. They are muriform, meaning they are divided into several smaller diamond-shaped compartments by several transverse and longitudinal septa.

Astrothelium elixii contains lichexanthone, a lichen product that causes it to fluoresce a yellow colour when lit with a long-wavelength UV light. Another major substance detected in the lichen (using thin-layer chromatography) is isohypocrellin.
