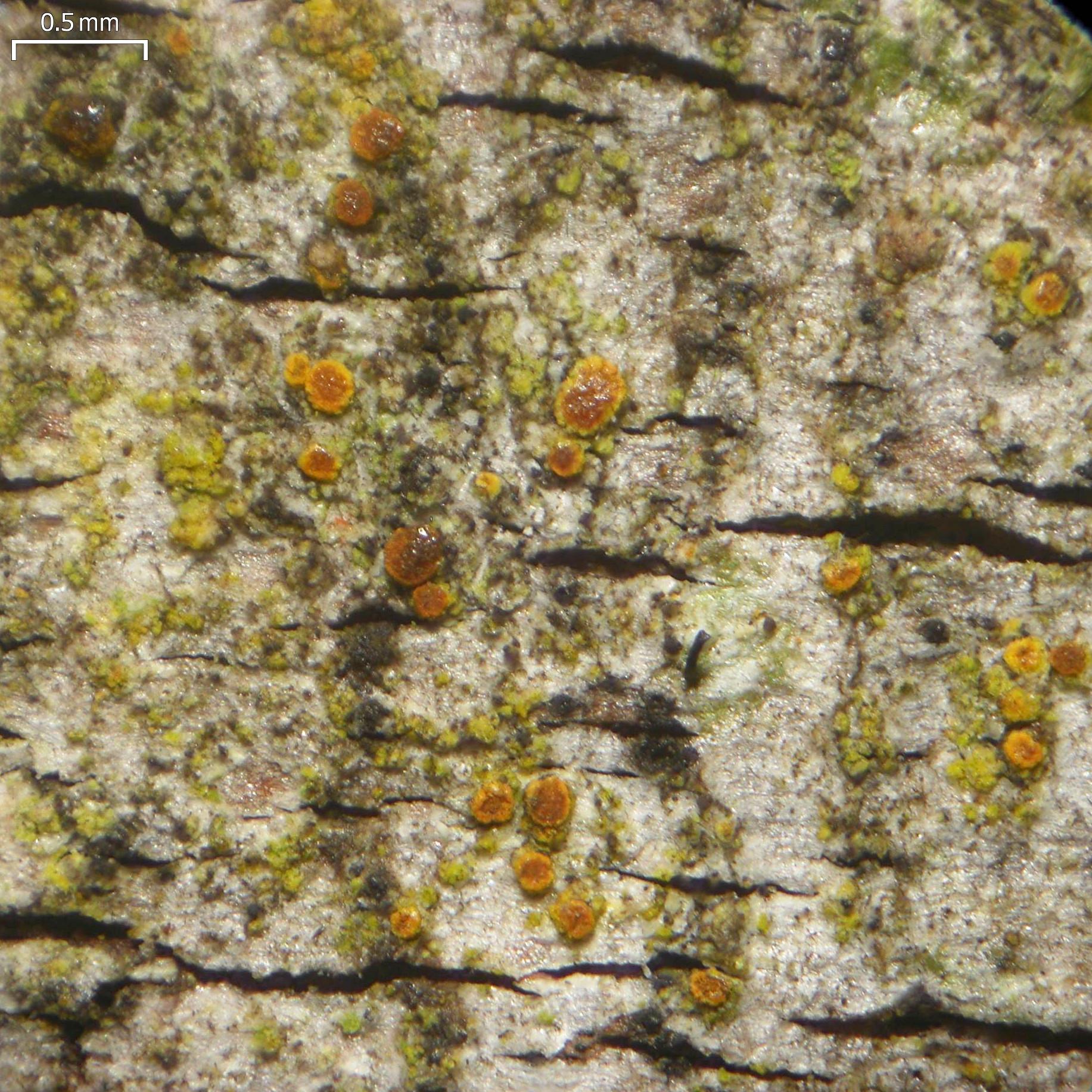
- scale bar = 0.5 mm

Scientific classification
- Domain: Eukaryota
- Kingdom: Fungi
- Division: Ascomycota
- Class: Lecanoromycetes
- Order: incertae sedis
- Family: incertae sedis
- Genus: Piccolia
- Species: P. nannaria

Binomial name
- Piccolia nannaria (Tuck.) Lendemer & Beeching (2007)

Synonyms
- Heterothecium nannarium Tuck. (1872); Heterothecium conspersum subsp. nannarium (Tuck.) Tuck. (1888); Biatorella nannaria (Tuck.) Zahlbr. (1927)

= Piccolia nannaria =

Species of lichen

Piccolia nannaria is a species of crustose lichen in the class Lecanoromycetes. It is widespread but uncommon in the coastal plain of southeastern North America. Initially thought to be corticolous (bark-dwelling), later collection of the lichen suggest that it may be lichenicolous (lichen-dwelling).

== Taxonomy ==
The species was first formally described as a new species in 1872 by American lichenologist Edward Tuckerman, as Heterothecium nannarium. The type specimen was collected by Charles Wright in Texas in 1850. Alexander Zahlbruckner proposed a transfer to the genus Biatorella in 1927. James Lendemer and Sean Beeching transferred the taxon to the genus Piccolia in 2007.

== Description ==
Piccolia nannaria is characterized by its granular and leprose yellow exterior or thallus. Its apothecia, which range in colour from a subtle green to an orange-yellow, are quite tiny, and its asci are polysporous, housing numerous minuscule spherical, colourless ascospores.

== Distribution and ecology ==
The lichen is widespread but uncommon in the coastal plain of southeastern North America, south to Georgia. Its range was later extended after it was recorded as far north as Maryland. In the Delmarva Peninsula, several populations were discovered where the lichen had numerous pycnidia (not previously reported in this species), but lacked apothecia. Although the lichen was previously assumed to be corticolous (bark-dwelling), further collections and additional investigation of previously collected specimens suggests that the species may be lichenicolous (lichen-dwelling), as it appears to be consistently associated and growing over the crustose lichen Pyrrhospora varians, sometimes to the point almost almost completely obscuring the thallus of its putative host. Additional research is needed to firmly establish the ecological preferences of this lichen.
