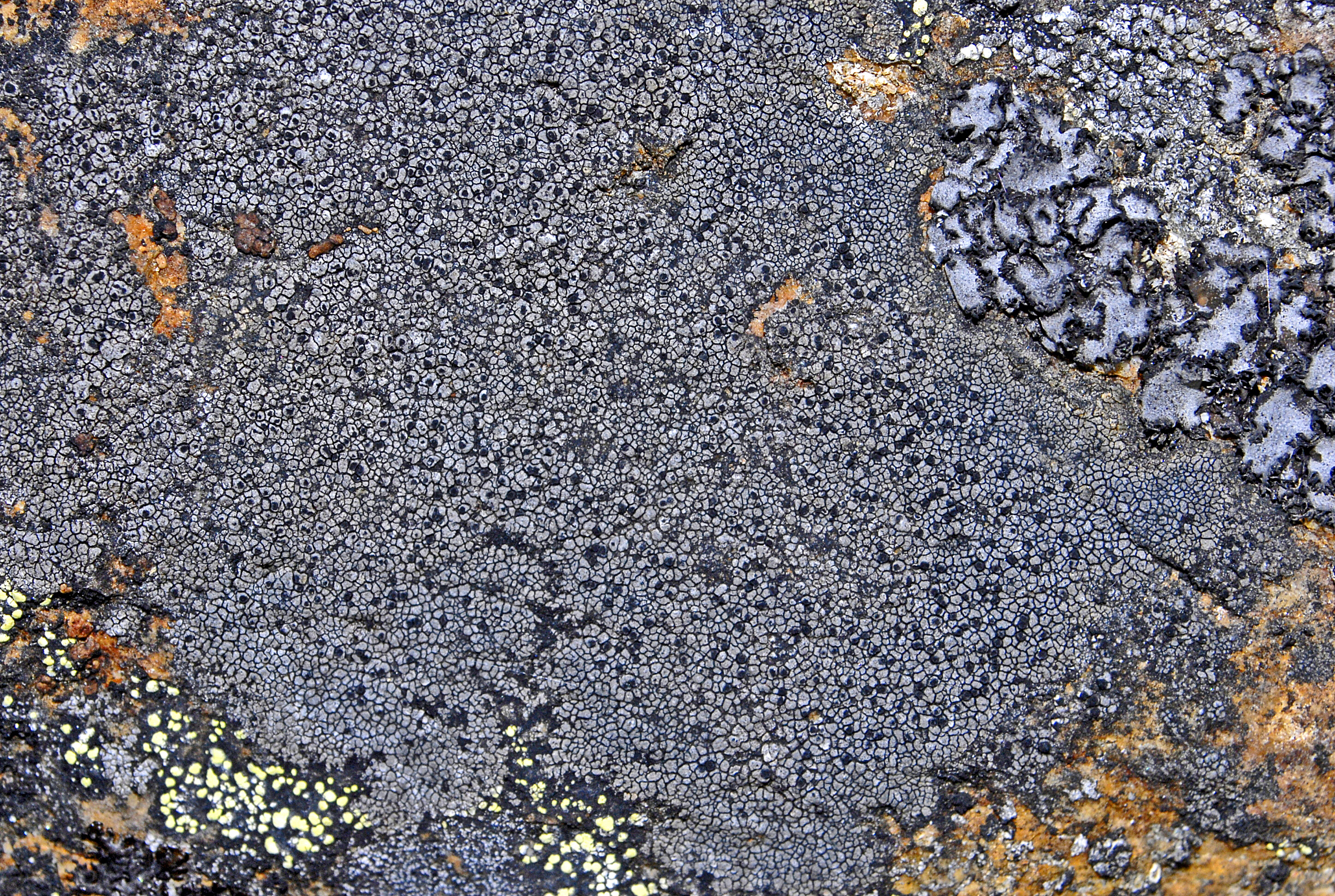
- Orphniospora groenlandica

Scientific classification
- Kingdom: Fungi
- Division: Ascomycota
- Class: Lecanoromycetes
- Order: Umbilicariales
- Family: Fuscideaceae
- Genus: Orphniospora; Körb. (1874)

Type species
- Orphniospora groenlandica Körb. (1874)

Species
- O. groenlandica O. moriopsis O. mosigii

Synonyms
- Orphniosporomyces Cif. & Tomas. (1953)

= Orphniospora =

Genus of lichens

Orphniospora is a small genus of lichen-forming fungi in the family Fuscideaceae. The genus was established in 1874 by the German lichenologist Gustav Wilhelm Körber and comprises three saxicolous (rock-dwelling) crustose species. These lichens are distinguished by their unusual spores, which are nearly spherical, single-celled, and produced only a few at a time in each spore-bearing structure. Despite being placed in the family Fuscideaceae in recent classifications, molecular studies have shown that Orphniospora does not actually belong to this family, leaving its correct taxonomic position uncertain.

== Taxonomy ==
Orphniospora was circumscribed by the German lichenologist Gustav Wilhelm Körber in 1874. He created the genus for crustose lichens whose spores are monoblastic—single-celled or non-septate—almost spherical, and produced only a few per ascus (oligosporous). This spore morphology sets the genus apart from typical lecidioid lichens. In his protologue Körber described a uniformly crustose thallus and black, sessile apothecia whose spore-bearing layer overlies a simple brown hypothecium. He also recognised a second species, O. groenlandica, which has a thin, granular thallus merging with the substrate and rare, terminally flattened apothecia with delicate margins. Further diagnostic characters include a violet-tinged hymenium with conglutinate (stuck-together) paraphyses and a granular brown hypothecium, together with the distinctive spores. The correct taxonomic placement of Orphniospora is unclear. Although it has been placed in the family Fuscideaceae in recent fungal classifications, molecular phylogenetics work has shown that it does not belong to this family.

== Description ==
The thallus of Orphniospora species forms a crust tightly attached to the substrate, breaking into small, tile-like areoles that give the surface a mosaic appearance. A thin, blackish prothallus—essentially a boundary zone where no lichenised tissue develops—often outlines the colony. The photobiont partner is a single-celled green alga (chlorococcoid). Black, disc-shaped apothecia (fruiting bodies) arise directly from the thallus without a surrounding rim of thallus tissue. Their surfaces are sometimes dusted with a faint rusty or ochre powder (pruina). Both the outer wall (exciple) and the layer beneath the spore-producing tissue (hypothecium) are dark brown, whereas the hymenium—the fertile layer in which spores develop—is colourless but may turn pale blue with iodine staining. Under the microscope, the hymenium is interlaced with slender, mostly unbranched paraphyses—sterile filaments that separate the developing asci (spore sacs) and can fuse to one another (anastomose). Each club-shaped ascus contains eight ascospores and shows a narrow, weakly iodine-reactive apical dome, overlaid by a more diffuse cap that turns a strong blue in combined potassium iodide tests (K/I+). The ascospores themselves are thick-walled, ellipsoidal, and vary from colourless to dark olive-brown; they may be single-celled or have an indistinct median septum. Asexual reproduction occurs in tiny, immersed pycnidia that release colourless, rod-shaped conidia formed on simple cylindrical conidiophores. Standard thin-layer chromatography has failed to detect any secondary metabolites in the genus.

== Ecology ==
Orphniospora lichen are saxicolous, and grow on hard siliceous rocks.

== Species ==
Species Fungorum (in the Catalogue of Life) accepts three species in Orphniospora:

- Orphniospora groenlandica Körb. (1874)
- Orphniospora moriopsis (A.Massal.) D.Hawksw. (1982)
- Orphniospora mosigii (Körb.) Hertel & Rambold (1988)
