= John Alan Elix =

Organic chemist, lichenologist

- Born: 1941
- Awards: Acharius Medal (2004); Nancy T. Burbidge Medal (2015)
- Academic career
- Fields: Organic chemistry lichenology taxonomy, plant physiology
- Institutions: Australian National University (1967–)
- Doctoral students: Simone Henrica J.J. Louwhoff
- Author abbrev. (botany): Elix

John Alan (Jack) Elix (born 1941) emeritus professor in chemistry at the Australian National University, is an organic chemist who has contributed in many fields: lichenology, lichen chemotaxonomy, plant physiology and biodiversity and natural product chemistry. He has authored 2282 species names, and 67 genera in the field of mycology. Elix edited the exsiccata series Lichenes Australasici exsiccati.

The standard author abbreviation Elix is used to indicate this person as the author when citing a botanical name.

== Education ==
His first degree, B.Sc., and his Ph.D. were both in organic chemistry from the University of Adelaide. This was followed by post-doctoral years at the University of Cambridge and then a D.Sc. in natural products chemistry from the Australian National University.

== Career ==
Elix spent a post doctoral year in 1966 at Cambridge, returning to Australia in 1967 to a lectureship in chemistry at the ANU. He retired as professor of chemistry in 2002, becoming professor emeritus.

By 1975 he had already published several papers on the organic chemistry of lichens, and ultimately leading to work on the evolution, taxonomy and phylogeny of lichens. For his work on lichens, Elix was awarded the Acharius Medal in 2004 and the Nancy T Burbidge Medal in 2015. He is a prolific author (or coauthor) of new fungal and lichen species, having formally described about 1147 as of December 2017.

He was honoured in 1997, when lichenologist Helge Thorsten Lumbsch published Elixiaceae which is a family of fungi in the order Umbilicariales. It contains two genera, Meridianelia, and the type genus, Elixia, which is named after John Alan Elix.

He was also honoured again in 2004, with Melanelixia, which is a genus of foliose lichens in the family Parmeliaceae, and in 2016 with Astrothelium elixii, a rare bark-dwelling Bolivian lichen.

== Selected publications ==
- Elix, John A; Ernst-Russell, Karin D (1993), A catalogue of standardized thin layer chromatographic data and biosynthetic relationships for lichen substances, Australian National University

=== See also ===
- Category:Taxa named by John Alan Elix
