= Maronea (lichen) =

Scientific classification
- Domain: Eukaryota
- Kingdom: Fungi
- Division: Ascomycota
- Class: Lecanoromycetes
- Order: Umbilicariales
- Family: Fuscideaceae
- Genus: Maronea; A.Massal. (1856)

Type species
- Maronea berica A.Massal. (1856)

Species
- M. afroalpina M. berica M. constans

Genus of lichenized fungi

Maronea is a genus of lichenized fungi in the family Fuscideaceae.

The genus name of Maronea is in honour of Nicoló Marogna (1573-1643), who was an Italian teacher, Apothecary and botanist from Verona.

The genus was circumscribed by Abramo Bartolommeo Massalongo in Flora vol.39 on page 291 in 1856.
