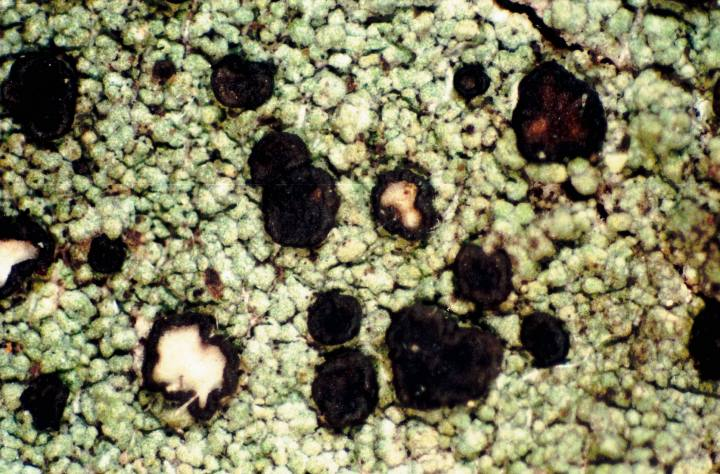
- Ropalospora chlorantha

Scientific classification
- Domain: Eukaryota
- Kingdom: Fungi
- Division: Ascomycota
- Class: Lecanoromycetes
- Order: Umbilicariales
- Family: Ropalosporaceae; Hafellner (1984)
- Genus: Ropalospora; A.Massal. (1860)

Type species
- Ropalospora caffra A.Massal. (1860)

= Ropalospora =

Genus of lichens

Ropalospora is a genus of lichen-forming fungi, and the sole member of the monogeneric family Ropalosporaceae. The genus was circumscribed by Italian lichenologist Abramo Bartolommeo Massalongo in 1860. The family was proposed by Josef Hafellner in 1984.

== Species ==
- Ropalospora atroumbrina (H.Magn.) S.Ekman (1993)
- Ropalospora caffra A.Massal. (1860)
- Ropalospora chirisanensis S.Y.Kondr., Lőkös & Hur (2016)
- Ropalospora chlorantha (Tuck.) S.Ekman (1993)
- Ropalospora hibernica (P.James & Poelt) Tønsberg (1993)
- Ropalospora lugubris (Sommerf.) Poelt (1980)
- Ropalospora phaeoplaca (Zahlbr.) S.Ekman (1996)
- Ropalospora rossii Øvstedal (2001)
- Ropalospora viridis (Tønsberg) Tønsberg (1992)
