= Elixiaceae =

Scientific classification
- Kingdom: Fungi
- Division: Ascomycota
- Class: Lecanoromycetes
- Order: Umbilicariales
- Family: Elixiaceae; Lumbsch (1997)

Type genus
- Elixia Lumbsch (1997)

Genera
- Elixia; Meridianelia

Family of fungi

The Elixiaceae are a family of lichen-forming fungi in the order Umbilicariales. It contains two genera, Meridianelia, and the type genus, Elixia, which together have a total of three species. The family was circumscribed by lichenologist Helge Thorsten Lumbsch in 1997. The family name honours Australian lichenologist John Alan Elix.
