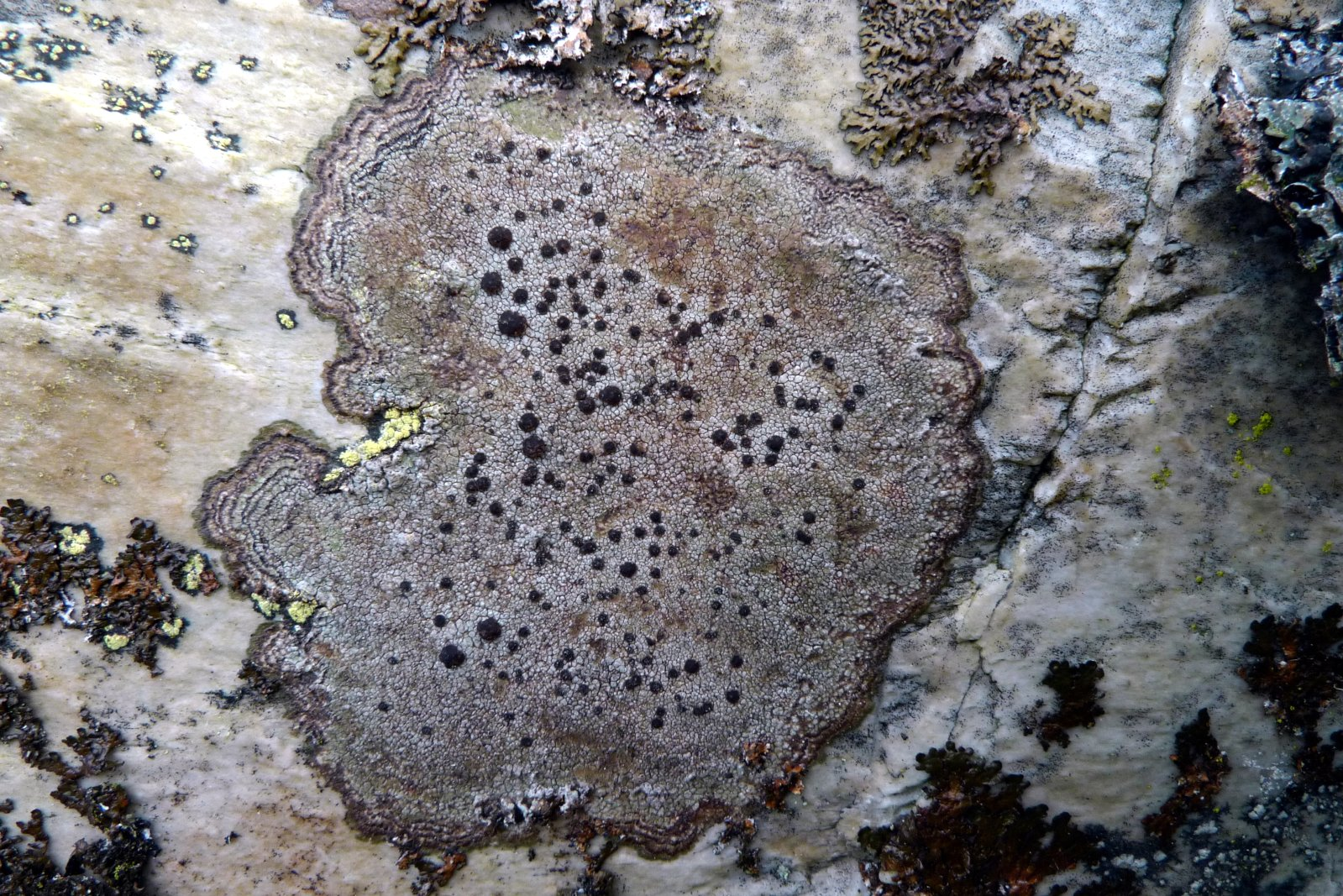
- Fuscidea cyathoides

Scientific classification
- Kingdom: Fungi
- Division: Ascomycota
- Class: Lecanoromycetes
- Order: Umbilicariales
- Family: Fuscideaceae
- Genus: Fuscidea; V.Wirth & Vèzda (1972)

Type species
- Fuscidea aggregatilis (Grummann) V.Wirth & Vězda (1972)

Synonyms
- Biatorinella Deschâtres & Werner (1974); Fuscidea V.Wirth & Vězda (1972)

= Fuscidea =

Genus of lichen-forming fungi

Fuscidea is a genus of crustose lichens in the family Fuscideaceae. It has about 40 species. The genus was established in 1972 by Volkmar Wirth and Antonín Vězda, with its name derived from the Latin for 'brown', referring to the typical colouration of these lichens. Species of Fuscidea grow almost exclusively on acidic, silica-rich rocks, favouring steep faces in humid, high-rainfall regions such as Atlantic coastlines and mountain ranges. They form cracked or patchy crusts that spread over a characteristically dark underlying margin, often creating mosaic-like patterns where neighbouring colonies meet.

== Taxonomy ==
Fuscidea was circumscribed in 1972 by the lichenologists Volkmar Wirth and Antonín Vězda as part of their revision of the Lecidea cyathoides (= rivulosa) group, which they regarded as an isolated and coherent assemblage within the then broadly defined genus Lecidea. They argued that some species of this group had been misplaced in Microlecia, because Choisy's concept of that genus also included unrelated Catillaria species, and they therefore restricted Microlecia to the Catillaria-like taxa with Microlecia lenticularis as its type. To accommodate the Lecidea cyathoides group they established Fuscidea, designating Fuscidea aggregata (based on Lecidea contigua var. rivulosa β aggregata Flotow) as the type species, and they provided new combinations for fifteen species previously placed in Lecidea. Wirth had already introduced the name earlier the same year in a study of siliceous rock lichen communities, but without designating a type species, so the diagnosis and combinations were republished in their joint paper.

In the protologue Wirth and Vězda characterised Fuscidea as a group of crustose lichens with brown to dark brown apothecia, a pale hymenium and hypothecium, a brown proper exciple, paraphyses with pigmented apices, and spores that may become brownish and sometimes 1-septate with age. They also stressed the presence of brown, crateriform pycnidia with very short conidia, and a dark marginal line to the thallus, and regarded Fuscidea as closely related to Buellia species with thin-walled spores. The species were described as strongly acidophilous lichens of siliceous rock, avoiding calcareous and other base-rich substrates, and occurring mainly on steep rock faces in humid, high-rainfall regions, particularly in Atlantic areas and mountain ranges; only a single species was known from bark. The generic name is derived from the Latin fuscus ('brown'), referring to the frequent brownish coloration of the thallus and apothecia.

== Description ==
Species of the genus Fuscidea are crustose lichens with a thallus that is cracked or divided into small areoles, usually spreading over a dark, often conspicuous prothallus so that neighbouring thalli form mosaic-like patches. The upper surface has an undifferentiated cortex, sometimes with a thin layer of brownish surface cells, while a true lower cortex is lacking. The photobiont is a chlorococcoid green alga, identified as Apatococcus, whose cells tend to occur in small clusters of two to four and are often slightly irregular in shape, with one flattened side. The medulla only rarely gives a blue staining reaction with iodine-based reagents.

Fruiting bodies are apothecia that range from immersed in the thallus to clearly sessile. Their discs are red-brown to blackish brown and always appear brownish when wet rather than truly black. They lack a thalline margin, although a weak pseudothalline margin may be present in some species. The proper exciple is usually distinct, but may become occluded in older apothecia; it is the same colour as or paler than the disc, with a colourless to pale inner portion and a darker brown outer zone. The epithecium is brown, and the hymenium is colourless to faintly brownish and does not stain in iodine. The hypothecium is colourless or pale straw-coloured, with erect hyphae. The hymenial gel contains unbranched to richly branched paraphyses that are only weakly glued together in water but become more clearly separate in potassium hydroxide solution; their upper cells carry a brown pigment cap. Asci are 8-spored and somewhat cylindrical to clavate; they belong to the Fuscidea-type, with a distinctive amyloid apical cap structure in iodine preparations. Ascospores are colourless (sometimes browning with age), mostly ellipsoidal but ranging from almost spherical to somewhat elongated, straight to curved or bean-shaped, and are usually lack septa, only rarely 1-septate.

Asexual reproduction takes place through pycnidia, which are immersed in small thalline warts or become slightly emergent; their walls are brown and do not react in common lichen spot tests. They produce simple conidia that are either cylindrical with blunt ends or ellipsoidal. Chemically, Fuscidea species contain orcinol para-depsides and tridepsides, together with other compounds such as fumarprotocetraric and alectorialic acids and various fatty acids.

== Species ==
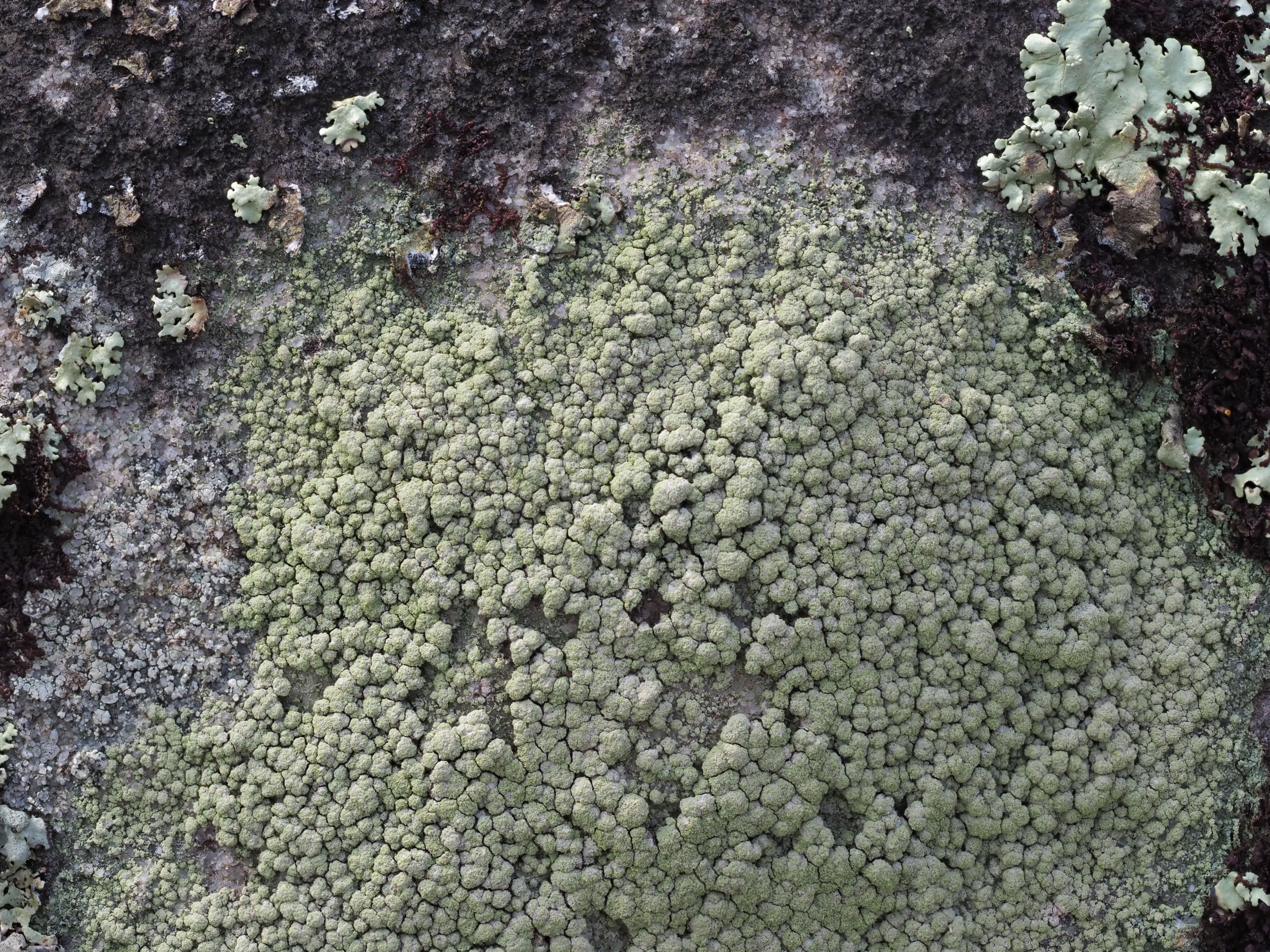
Fuscidea appalachensis

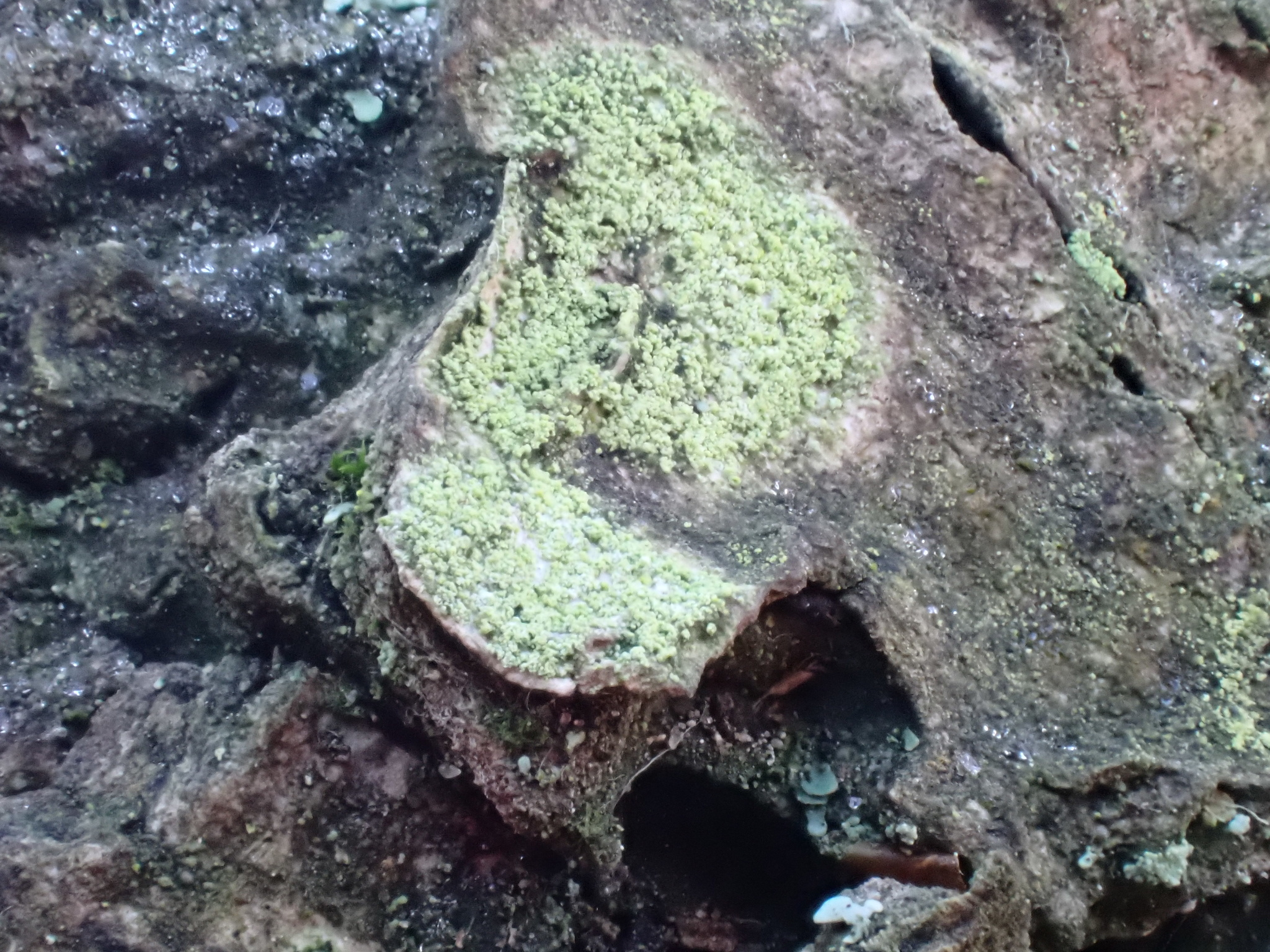
Fuscidea pusilla

As of March 2026, Species Fungorum (in the Catalogue of Life) accepts 42 species of Fuscidea.

- Fuscidea aleutica (Degel.) Fryday (2008)
- Fuscidea appalachensis Fryday (2008) – Appalachian Mountains of Northeastern North America
- Fuscidea arboricola Coppins & Tønsberg (1992)
- Fuscidea asbolodes (Nyl.) Hertel & V.Wirth (1984)
- Fuscidea austera (Nyl.) P.James (1980)
- Fuscidea australis Kantvilas (2001)
- Fuscidea coreana S.Y.Kondr., Lőkös & Hur (2015)
- Fuscidea cyathoides (Ach.) V.Wirth & Vězda (1972)
- Fuscidea elixii Kantvilas (2004)
- Fuscidea extremorientalis S.Y.Kondr., Lőkös & Hur (2015)
- Fuscidea fagicola (Zschacke) Hafellner & Türk (2001)
- Fuscidea gothoburgensis (H.Magn.) V.Wirth & Vězda (1972)
- Fuscidea intercincta (Nyl.) Poelt (1978)
- Fuscidea kochiana (Hepp) V.Wirth & Vězda (1972)
- Fuscidea lightfootii (Sm.) Coppins & P.James (1978)
- Fuscidea lygaea (W.Mann) V.Wirth & Vězda (1972)
- Fuscidea maccarthyi Kantvilas (2004)
- Fuscidea mayrhoferi Kantvilas (2004)
- Fuscidea mollis (Wahlenb.) V.Wirth & Vězda (1972)
- Fuscidea multispora Flakus, Kukwa & Rodr. Flakus (2019) – Bolivia
- Fuscidea muskeg Tønsb. & M.Zahradn. (2020) – Alaska
- Fuscidea oceanica Fryday & Coppins (2012)
- Fuscidea praeruptorum (Du Rietz & H.Magn.) V.Wirth & Vězda (1972)
- Fuscidea pusilla Tønsberg (1992)
- Fuscidea ramboldioides Kantvilas (2001)
- Fuscidea recensa (Stirt.) Hertel, V.Wirth & Vězda (1972)
- Fuscidea scrupulosa (Eckfeldt) Fryday (2008)
- Fuscidea stiriaca (A.Massal.) Hafellner (2002)
- Fuscidea subasbolodes Kantvilas (2001)
- Fuscidea texana Fryday (2008) – Texas
- Fuscidea tropica van den Boom & Kalb (2014)
