= Albemarle-Pamlico Peninsula =

Coordinates: 35.726°N 76.031°W

- Peninsula
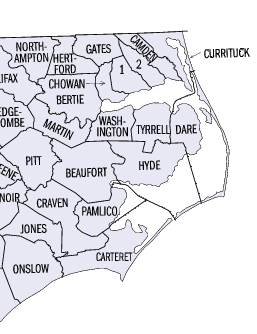
- Albemarle-Pamlico Peninsula is the largest peninsula on the North Carolina seacoast (right) and includes 5 counties.
- Interactive map of Albemarle-Pamlico Peninsula
- Country: United States
- State: North Carolina
- Region: Outer Banks

Area
  - Total: 1,200 sq mi (3,200 km^{2})

Albemarle-Pamlico Peninsula is a large peninsula (about 3,200 square miles) on the North Carolina coast, lying between the Albemarle Sound to the north and the Pamlico Sound to the south. The 5 counties of Dare, Hyde, Beaufort, Tyrrell, and Washington all lie wholly or partly on the peninsula.

Much of the peninsula is covered with marshland. It is a low-lying area; the majority of the peninsular is less than 4 metres (13 ft) above sea level. The pocosin marshlands of the Albemarle-Pamlico peninsula drain into the Alligator River, an important link in the intracoastal waterway.

Forty four percent of the peninsula is owned by timber companies, and another twenty one percent of the peninsula is owned by agricultural corporations. This led to a great deal of deforestation on the peninsula in the 1980s, to the extent that only one third of the peninsula's pocosin marshlands continue to exist in their unaltered form. Soybeans, corn, pines, cattle, and hogs were all raised on the peninsula. Many of the larger farms have gone bankrupt, but some pine farms continue to exist on the peninsula.

== Ecology ==
The peninsula is surrounded by the Albemarle, Croatan, and Pamlico Sounds. It is the second largest estuary complex in the United States.

The peninsula is made up of wildlife preserves, agricultural lands, and both federal- and state-owned preserves. It previously contained over 500,000 acres of Atlantic white cedar forest; less than 5% of this remains due to farming and drainage of the area that began with European colonization in the 1700s.

=== Climate change ===
Sea levels in the Albemarle-Pamlico Peninsula are rising at twice the rate of the national average. As of 2023, salinity levels have more than doubled in some areas since the 1980s.

In 2009, the North Carolina chapter of the Nature Conservancy began a project to address the rising salinity levels in wetlands on the Albemarle-Pamlico peninsula. This included plugging agricultural canals and updating antiquated water control infrastructure.

== Towns and cities ==
- Bath
- Belhaven
- Columbia
- Creswell
- Engelhard
- Fairfield
- Manns Harbor
- Pantego
- Plymouth
- Roper
- Swan Quarter
