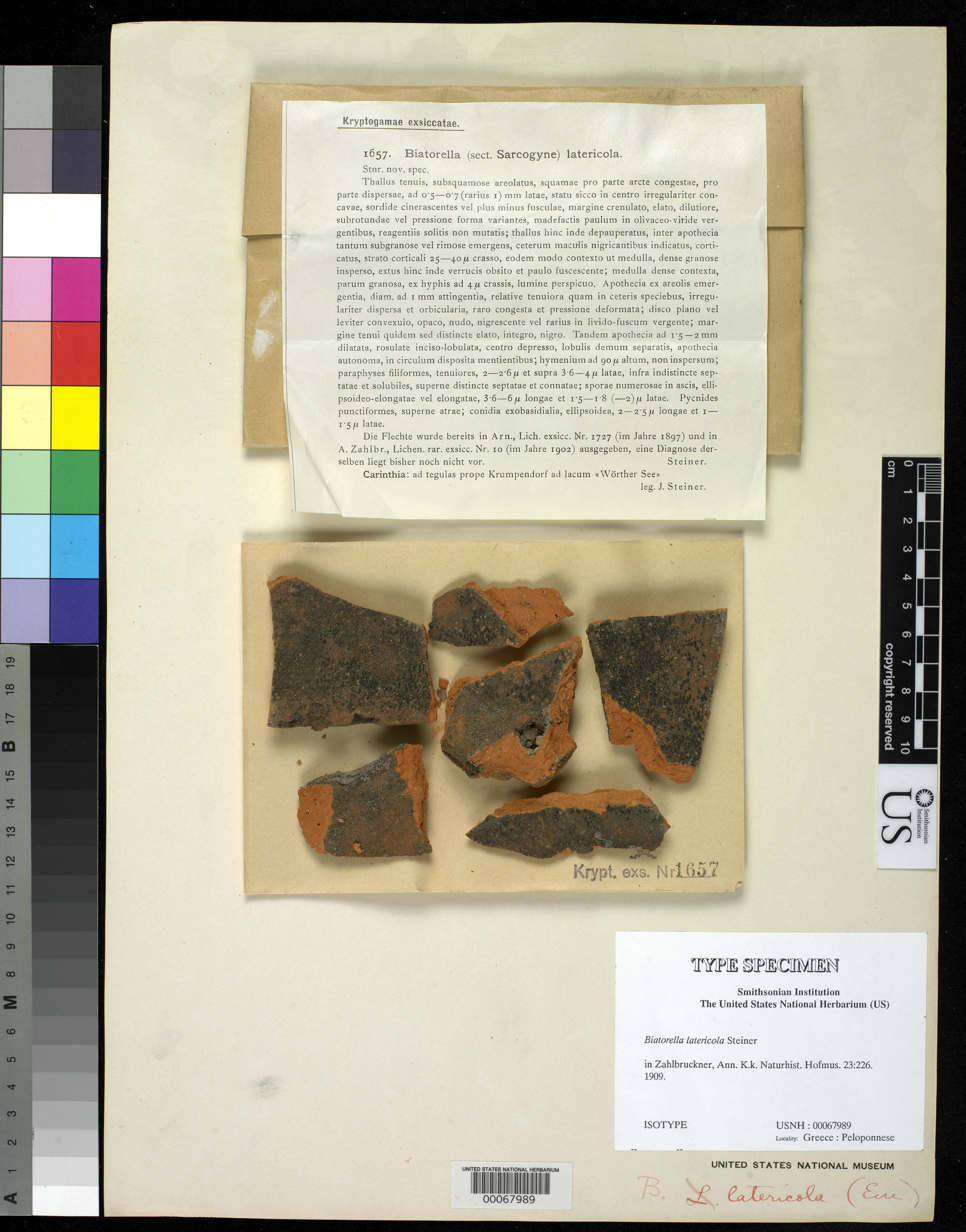
- Biatorella latericola

Scientific classification
- Kingdom: Fungi
- Division: Ascomycota
- Class: Lecanoromycetes
- Family: Biatorellaceae
- Genus: Biatorella; De Not. (1846)

Type species
- Biatorella rousselii (Durieu & Mont.) De Not. (1846)

Species
- See text

Synonyms
- Myrioblastus Trevis.

= Biatorella =

Genus of lichen-forming fungi

Biatorella is a genus of lichen-forming fungi in the family Biatorellaceae.

== Taxonomy ==
The genus Biatorella was established by Giuseppe De Notaris in 1846. In his diagnosis, De Notaris characterised the genus by hemispherical, tubercle-like apothecia (fruiting bodies) with a broad, closely attached base. The apothecia are somewhat waxy, bright orange, and lack a proper margin (excipulum); the central mass is reddish and bears the spore-producing layer on the upper surface. The spore-containing sacs (asci) are club-shaped and eight-spored, and the accompanying paraphyses are very slender. The spores are transparent, elongate-linear with blunt ends, and arranged in a single row (uniseriate).

De Notaris described the thallus as leprose (powdery), very thin, greenish, and loosely effuse across the substrate. He included a single species in the original circumscription, Biatorella rousselii, separating it from Biatora by the absence of a proper excipulum, by its hemispherical hypothecium, and by the thallus structure. He noted that B. roussellii had been previously described by Durieu and Montagne in their work on Algerian cryptogams. In Italy, he recorded it on bare soil at field margins above Genoa and considered it rare. He also remarked that spore-like granules (sporidiola) within the spores indicated that the spores were not yet mature.

== Species ==
As of October 2025, Species Fungorum (in the Catalogue of Life) accept 27 species of Biatorella.

- Biatorella amabilis B.de Lesd. (1933)
- Biatorella arachnoidea C.W.Dodge & G.E.Baker (1938)
- Biatorella australica Räsänen (1949)
- Biatorella bambusarum Zahlbr. (1930)
- Biatorella biformis Kušan (1928)
- Biatorella brasiliensis H.Magn. (1935)
- Biatorella carpinacea Velen. (1934)
- Biatorella consanguinea (Stirt.) Zahlbr. (1927)
- Biatorella delitescens Arnold (1876)
- Biatorella desmaspora (C.Knight) Hellb. (1896)
- Biatorella embergeri Werner & M.Choisy (1931)
- Biatorella epiphysa (Stirt.) Hellb. (1896)
- Biatorella flavocinerea Walt. Watson (1930)
- Biatorella floridensis H.Magn. (1935)
- Biatorella fossarum (Dufour) Th.Fr. (1874)
- Biatorella hemisphaerica Anzi (1860)
- Biatorella immersa A.Massal. (1852)
- Biatorella koltarum Räsänen (1943)
- Biatorella kulshanensis Herre (1943)
- Biatorella ligni-putridi Palice & Vondrák (2024)
- Biatorella minima Velen. 1934)
- Biatorella nitens Th.Fr. (1861)
- Biatorella quercina Velen. (1934)
- Biatorella rappii Zahlbr. (1931)
- Biatorella rousselii De Not. (1846)
- Biatorella saxicola Aptroot & Sipman (2001)
- Biatorella tiroliensis H.Magn. (1935)
