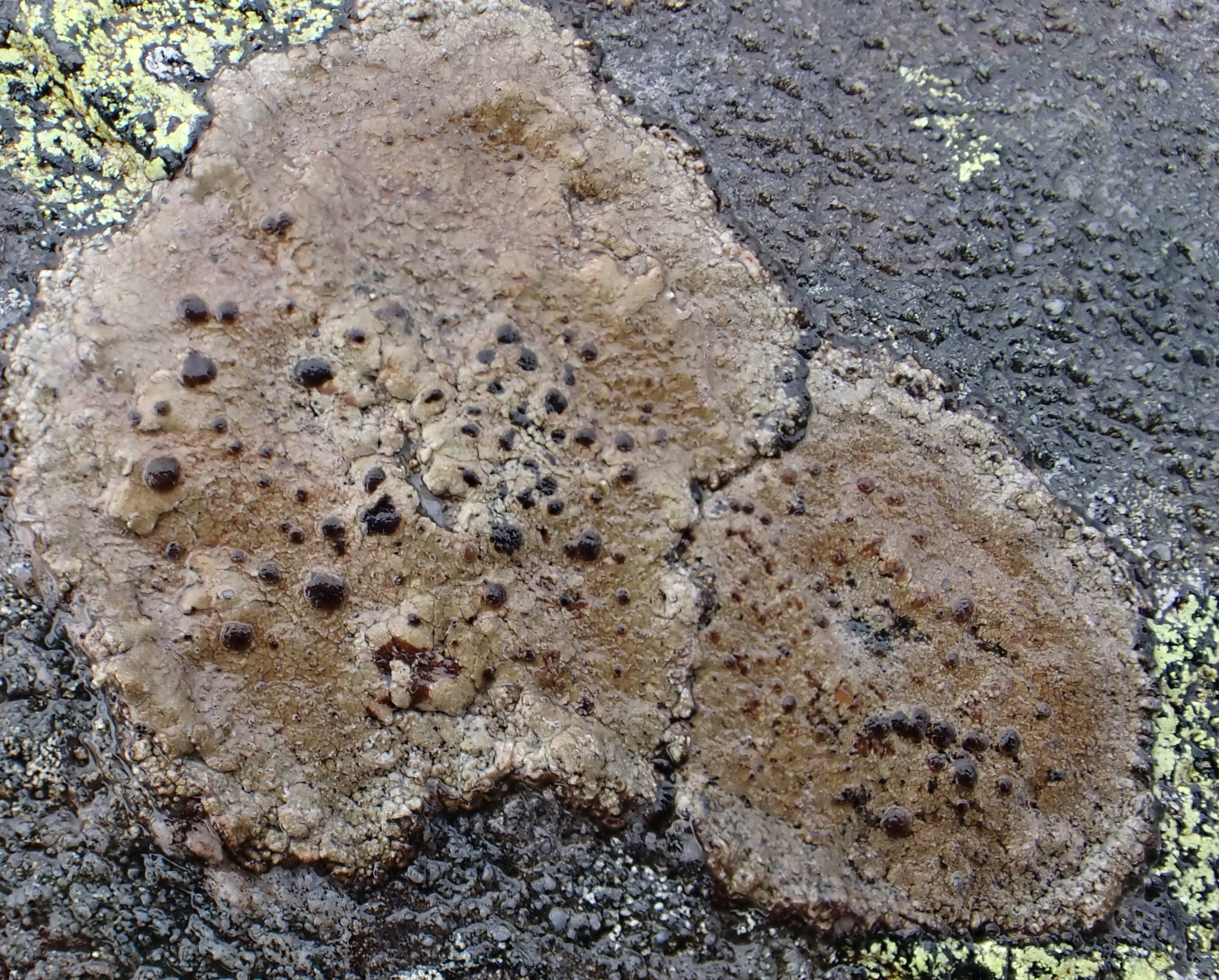
- Fuscidea cyathoides

Scientific classification
- Kingdom: Fungi
- Division: Ascomycota
- Class: Lecanoromycetes
- Order: Umbilicariales
- Family: Fuscideaceae; Hafellner (1984)

Type genus
- Fuscidea V.Wirth & Vězda (1972)

Genera
- Albemarlea; Fuscidea; Maronea; Maronora

= Fuscideaceae =

Family of lichen-forming fungi

Fuscideaceae is a family of fungi that form symbiotic relationships with algae to create lichens. These lichens typically have a crust-like appearance and are found worldwide, though they are most common in temperate regions. The family includes four genera and about 45 species, which primarily grow on tree bark, rocks, or occasionally on wood or leaves. Fuscideaceae lichens are characterised by their reproductive structures, cup-like formations called apothecia, which can vary in colour from red to dark brown or black. The family has undergone several changes in its classification over the years, with recent genetic studies placing it within the order Umbilicariales. Fuscideaceae lichens produce various chemical compounds (lichen products), some of which are unique to this family, and these chemicals are often used to help identify different species.

== Systematics ==
=== Taxonomy ===
The family was circumscribed by the lichenologist Josef Hafellner in 1984. He included the type genus, Fuscidea, and Maronea in his original conception of the family. He considered Maronea as sort of a version of Fuscidea with lecanorine apothecia and multi-spored asci. In his Outline of the Ascomycota series (2006), Ove Eriksson included the genus Hueidea in Fuscideaceae based on its Fuscidea-type asci as the diagnostic character. Both Loxospora and Sarrameana had been proposed for inclusion in the Fuscideaceae, but they are now both placed in a new family, the Sarrameanaceae. Ulrik Søchting and colleagues demonstrated with molecular data that Hueidea belongs in the Teloschistaceae (subfamily Caloplacoideae) and is congeneric with the Antarctic genus Huea; the Nomenclature Committee for Fungi has therefore recommended rejection of Huea, leaving Hueidea in Teloschistaceae and outside Fuscideaceae. The proposal is pending vote by the Nomenclature Committee and, if accepted, will be forwarded to the next International Botanical Congress.

In a proposal by Heidi Lie Andersen and Tor Tønsberg, published in late 2023, there has been a call to conserve the name Fuscidea over Maronea, to addressing a taxonomic and nomenclatural issue in the Fuscideaceae. This suggestion stems from multiple molecular studies, particularly those by Anya Bylin et al. (2007), Jolanta Miadlikowska et al. (2014), and research by Martina Zahradnikova (2017), which demonstrated that Maronea is paraphyletic to Fuscidea, with Maronea species nested within a larger monophyletic Fuscidea clade. The genus Maronea, described by Abramo Bartolommeo Massalongo in 1856, consists of about 12 species, with a more restricted distribution compared to Fuscidea, which comprises over 40 widely distributed species. To preserve nomenclatural stability and avoid the extensive renaming that transferring all Fuscidea species to Maronea or splitting Fuscidea into several smaller genera would entail, the authors advocate for conserving the name Fuscidea against Maronea. This approach aims to minimise name changes, maintaining a monophyletic group within Fuscideaceae and supporting nomenclatural consistency.

=== Classification ===
Since its proposal in 1984, the classification of family Fuscidaceae has been a matter of some debate. Hafellner originally thought the family to be more closely related to the Teloschistaceae than to the Lecideaceae or Lecanoraceae, and he classified the family in the suborder Teloschistineae of the order Teloschistales. He described the similarities in the ascus structure between the Teloschistaceae and Fuscideaceae as "unmistakable". Miadlikowska and colleagues (2006) discovered that the resemblance in ascus structure between the Fuscideaceae and Teloschistales is due to homoplasy.

In some preliminary molecular work, Lutzoni and colleagues concluded that the family was associated with the Ostropomycetidae. Reeb and colleagues (2004) identified the Umbilicariaceae as a closely related group to the Fuscideaceae, suggesting the establishment of a new order named Umbilicariales to encompass both groups. Wedin and others (2005) acknowledged a potential relationship between the Fuscideaceae and Umbilicariaceae, though with limited evidence. In 2006, Miadlikowska and her team recommended placing the Fuscideaceae-Ophioparmaceae-Umbilicariaceae grouping into a distinct order, Umbilicariales, under the class Lecanoromycetidae, yet this classification was not officially adopted. Bylin and associates (2007) observed Fuscideacea as a close relative to Umbilicariales, despite a lack of strong evidence. The Ropalosporaceae were reclassified with a provisional placement within the Umbilicariales due to an unclear relationship. Contrarily, Bendiksby and Timdal (2013) contested the inclusion of Fuscideaceae within the Umbilicariales despite noting similarities in the ascus structure between Umbilicaria and Fuscidea, characterised by an amyloid inner and outer layer separated by a nonamyloid layer. Molecular work by Miadlikowska and colleagues in 2014 suggested that the family occupied an outlying clade within the order Umbilicariales, which includes the Ophioparmaceae and Ropalosporaceae as well as the Umbilicariaceae itself. More recent multigene phylogenies (nrITS, nrLSU, mtSSU, RPB2) place Fuscideaceae firmly within Umbilicariales, sister to Umbilicariaceae + Ophioparmaceae, corroborating earlier suggestions based on ascus architecture. The current "Outline of Fungi" (2024) recognises Fuscideaceae as the sole family in Umbilicariales lacking foliose thalli.

== Description ==
Fuscideaceae lichens have a crust-like body (thallus), which often presents as a collection of tightly packed, cracked segments (areolate). It is not uncommon for these lichens to have a darker outline or base (prothallus), and some species may develop clusters of reproductive structures (soralia) on their surface. The photosynthetic partner within these lichens is typically chlorococcoid—a form of green algae.

The reproductive structures of these lichens, known as ascomata, take the form of apothecia, which are cup-like fungal structures. These can be either partially embedded in the thallus or sitting atop it (ranging from more or less immersed to sessile), and may or may not have a noticeable rim (thalline margin). The colour of the apothecia's disc varies from red to dark brown or black. Inside these structures, the supportive tissue (hamathecium) consists of sparsely to richly branched filaments (paraphyses), which often have coloured tips.

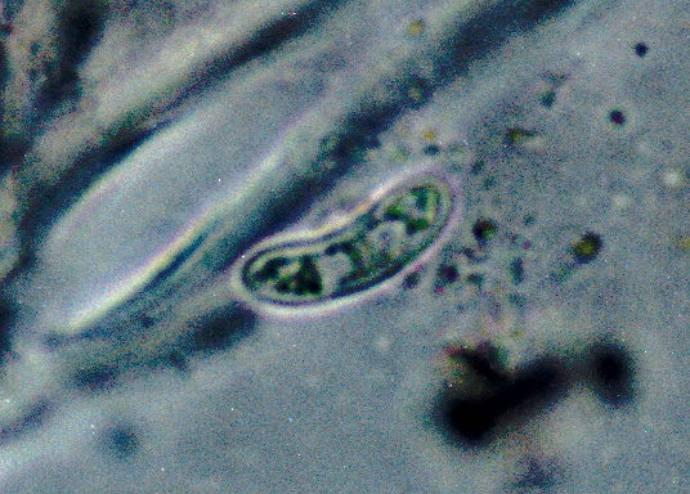
Kidney bean-shaped spore of Fuscidea recensa

The spore-producing cells (asci) feature a distinctive staining pattern when treated with certain chemical dyes (K/I+ dark blue for the external and internal layers, surrounded by a thick K/I+ pale blue gelatinous cap, but with a K/I– tube at the centre, or tholus). Fuscideaceae asci typically release eight or more spores, which are generally non-segmented (aseptate) or rarely divided once (1-septate), and range in colour from clear to pale brown. The shape of these spores can vary, with some resembling beans or showing a pinched middle section. The conidiomata are in the form of pycnidia; the conidia are non-septate, fusiform to ellipsoid in shape, and hyaline.

== Chemistry ==
Fuscideaceae species typically have either depsides, depsidones, or no lichen products at all. Other secondary chemical compounds found in Fuscideaceae include anthraquinones, benzyl esters, higher aliphatic acids, and usnic acid. Specific compounds identified from various members of the family include the orcinol depsides divaricatic acid, nordivaricatic acid, and imbricaric acid; the benzyl esters alectorialic acid and barbatolic acid.

== Habitat and distribution ==
Collectively, the Fuscideaceae has a cosmopolitan distribution, although species are predominantly found in temperate locales. The most extensive genus within this group, Fuscidea, contains over 40 species that are primarily found in the Northern Hemisphere, although they also occur in the Southern Hemisphere. Genus Albemarlea contains a single species that is found exclusively in North Carolina's Albemarle-Pamlico Peninsula.

Fuscideaceae species usually grow on bark, on rocks, or more rarely, on wood or leaves.

== Genera ==
- Albemarlea Lendemer & R.C.Harris (2016) – 1 sp.

Tentative placement in the Fuscideaceae. Its single species has a crust-like thallus, Fuscidea-type asci, and green coccoid photobiont, but lacks any lichen products.

- Fuscidea V.Wirth & Vězda (1972) – 40+ spp.
- Maronea A.Massal. (1856) – 12 spp.
- Maronora Kalb & Aptroot (2018) – 1 sp.

The genus Orphniospora Körb. (1874) was previously included in the family, but molecular analysis published in 2017 has since excluded it, and its phylogenetic affinity is considered uncertain. Lettauia is another genus that was included in the Fuscideaceae (sometimes tentatively), but it has since been synonymised with Cryptodiscus (family Stictidaceae). Maronea is kept in the Fuscideaceae pending the nomenclatural decision regarding its name.
