= Divaricatic acid =

Names
- IUPAC name 2-Hydroxy-4-(2-hydroxy-4-methoxy-6-propylbenzoyl)oxy-6-propylbenzoic acid

Identifiers
CAS Number	491-62-3
3D model (JSmol)	Interactive image
ChEBI	CHEBI:144147
ChEMBL	ChEMBL1965404
ChemSpider	329798
PubChem CID	371610
CompTox Dashboard (EPA)	DTXSID40197685
- InChI: InChI=1S/C21H24O7/c1-4-6-12-9-15(11-16(22)18(12)20(24)25)28-21(26)19-13(7-5-2)8-14(27-3)10-17(19)23/h8-11,22-23H,4-7H2,1-3H3,(H,24,25) Key: FSRDIJIAQPSMMR-UHFFFAOYSA-N
- SMILES: CCCC1=C(C(=CC(=C1)OC)O)C(=O)OC2=CC(=C(C(=C2)O)C(=O)O)CCC

Properties
Chemical formula	C_{21}H_{24}O_{7}
Molar mass	388.416 g·mol^{−1}
Appearance	Colorless crystalline needles
Melting point	129 °C (264 °F; 402 K)
- Except where otherwise noted, data are given for materials in their standard state (at 25 °C [77 °F], 100 kPa). Infobox references

Divaricatic acid is a chemical compound with the molecular formula C_{21}H_{24}O_{7}. It is found in a variety of lichens, including some in the genera Evernia, Lepraria, and Ramalina. It is classified as a depside.

Divaricatic acid forms colorless crystalline needles with a melting point of 129 °C.

Divaricatic acid has antibacterial properties against some Gram positive bacteria, such as Bacillus subtilis, Staphylococcus epidermidis, Streptococcus mutans, and Enterococcus faecium. Since it also has activity against methicillin-resistant Staphylococcus aureus (MRSA) with a potency equivalent to that of vancomycin, it has been suggested as a potential treatment for MRSA. It also has molluscicidal activity against Biomphalaria glabrata (ram's horn snail) and antiparasitic activity against cercariae of Schistosoma mansoni (blood fluke).
