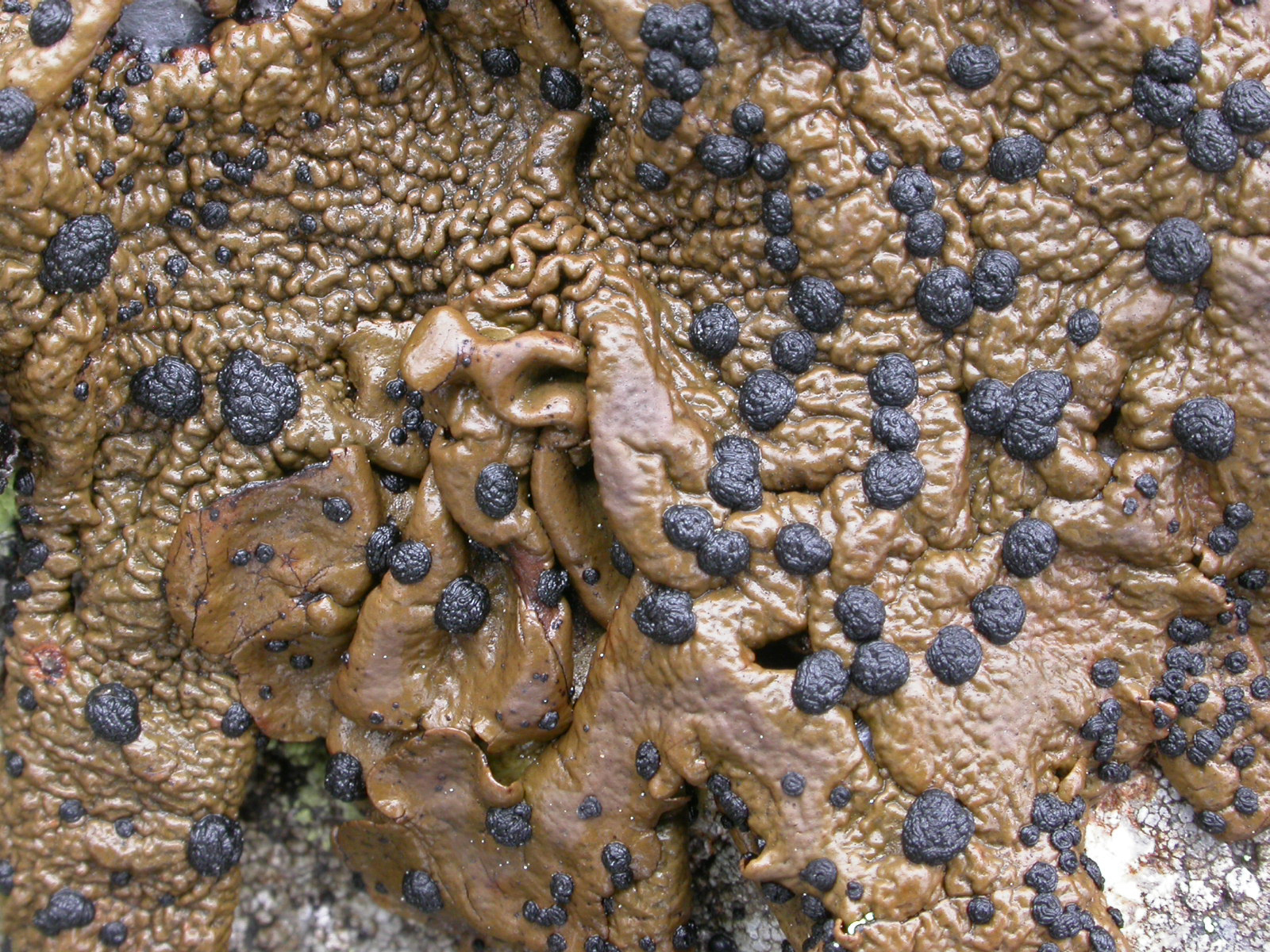
- Umbilicaria hyperborea

Scientific classification
- Kingdom: Fungi
- Division: Ascomycota
- Class: Lecanoromycetes
- Subclass: Umbilicariomycetidae; Bendiksby, Hestmark & Timdal (2013)
- Order: Umbilicariales; J.C.Wei & Q.M.Zhou (2007)

Families
- Elixiaceae; Fuscideaceae; Ophioparmaceae; Ropalosporaceae; Umbilicariaceae

= Umbilicariales =

Order of fungi

The Umbilicariales are an order of lichenized fungi in the subclass Umbilicariomycetidae, class Lecanoromycetes. It contains five families: Elixiaceae, Fuscideaceae, Ophioparmaceae, Ropalosporaceae, and Umbilicariaceae. Umbilicariales was proposed as a new order in 2007, while the subclass Umbilicariomycetidae was proposed in 2013.

== Families and genera ==
As of March 2021, Species Fungorum accepts 5 families, 18 genera, and 107 species in the order Umbilicariales:

- Elixiaceae

Elixia – 2 spp.
Meridianelia – 1 sp.

- Fuscideaceae

Albemarlea – 1 sp.
Fuscidea – 31 spp.
Hueidea – 1 sp.
Lettauia – 2 sp.
Maronea – 2 spp.
Maronora – 1 sp.
Orphniospora – 2 spp.

- Ophioparmaceae

Boreoplaca – 1 sp.
Hypocenomyce – 5 spp.
Ophioparma – 4 spp.

- Ropalosporaceae

Ropalospora – 8 spp.

- Umbilicariaceae

Fulgidea – 2 spp.
Lasallia – 5 spp.
Umbilicaria – 35 spp.
Xylopsora – 3 spp.
