= Niebla laminaria =

Scientific classification
- Kingdom: Fungi
- Division: Ascomycota
- Class: Lecanoromycetes
- Order: Lecanorales
- Family: Ramalinaceae
- Genus: Niebla
- Species: N. laminaria

Binomial name
- Niebla laminaria Spjut (1996)

Species of lichen

Niebla laminaria is a fruticose lichen that grows on rocks along the Pacific Coast of North America within the California Floristic Province, from Marin County, California south to Misión San Vicente Ferrer in Baja California, and in the Baja Channel Islands. The epithet, laminaria is in reference to the thallus divided into blade-like branches similar to a genus of brown algae, Laminaria.

== Distinguishing features ==
Niebla laminaria is distinguished by the thallus divided into relatively few (10 or less) subterete branches with a common attachment base (or holdfast) and with various short marginal lobes or spine-like branchlets, to 7 cm high and 4 cm across. The species (N. laminaria) is also recognized by containing divaricatic acid, with triterpenes, and by a relatively thick cortex, 80–200 μm thick covering a solid medulla, the cortex pale olive green to dark green, turning brown in the herbarium.

Niebla laminaria appears to intergrade with Niebla testudinaria in the northern geographical range of the species, Niebla eburnea in the mid range, and Niebla juncosa var. spinulifera in the southern range. This variation might also be seen as variants of the other species, except that specimens from Punta Banda and San Nicolas Island are remarkably similar in their morphology and in their secondary metabolites. This close morphological and chemical similarity between widely geographically separated individuals reinforces the recognition of N. laminaria as a distinct species as further exemplified in a genetic study of another fog lichen, Dendrographa leucophaea where thalli of D. leucophaea at Punta Banda and on San Nicolas Island, separated by water for a distance of 190 miles (Google Earth ruler), were found to be more genetically similar than to sterile and fertile forms of the same species growing next to each other. which they may be regarded cryptic species of a species pair. The morphological differences between N. laminaria and other related species in the genus Niebla, are evident; however, instead of sterile and fertile species as reported for D. leucophaea, sibling species may be recognized by the secondary lichen substances. For example, Niebla cornea in southern California may be viewed by some as a sekikaic acid race of N. laminaria, or as a separate undescribed species, or under a very broad interpretation of a species (Niebla homalea) in which the variation in morphology is viewed as being environmentally induced and in chemistry as chemosyndrome variation. Niebla laminaria as described above is defined by its morphology and by its secondary metabolites with emphasis placed on secondary metabolites, not an uncommon practice in taxonomic treatments of other lichen genera; Niebla cornea (sekikaic acid) and N. laminaria (divaricatic acid) are best distinguished by their lichen substances when they cannot be easily differentiated morphologically.

== Taxonomic history ==
Niebla laminaria was first recognized as part of a sample of Niebla homalea collected 29 April 1985 by Richard Spjut and Richard Marin on Punta Banda in Baja California for anti-HIV screening by the National Cancer Institute. Before submitting the sample on 2 Feb 1986, a thallus of Niebla laminaria (not yet described) was removed along with voucher specimens for N. homalea; the remaining material, 58 grams of N. homalea, was submitted to the NCI. The voucher specimen for N. homalea was deposited at the United States National Herbarium (Smithsonian Institution), Spjut & Marin 9032C. A thallus removed from the sample, Spjut & Marin 9032C3, is the holotype for N. laminaria. In collecting multiple thalli of a lichen species—for biochemical screening—such as in the genus Niebla, it can be a challenge to obtain uniform morphological and chemical thalli as a taxonomic sample. Under a very broad species concept (Niebla homalea); one that essentially recognizes only two species in the genus Niebla, this would be less of a problem, in contrast to a narrow species concept where Niebla is defined by the two-layered cortex, the isolated chondroid strands in the medulla, and by the lichen substances lacking the terpenes found in Vermilacinia.
