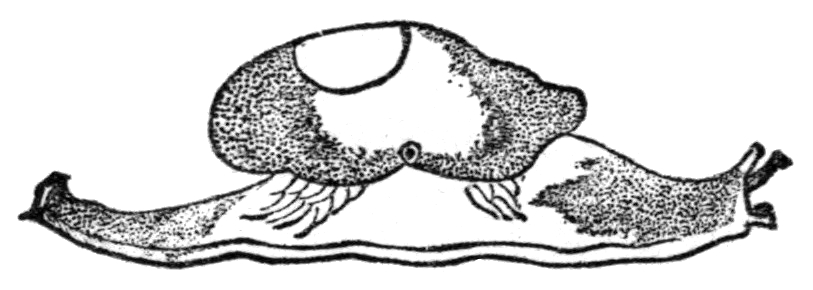

Conservation status
- Vulnerable (NatureServe)

Scientific classification
- Kingdom: Animalia
- Phylum: Mollusca
- Class: Gastropoda
- Order: Stylommatophora
- Family: Binneyidae
- Genus: Hemphillia
- Species: H. glandulosa

Binomial name
- Hemphillia glandulosa Thomas Bland & Binney, 1872

= Hemphillia glandulosa =

Species of gastropod

Hemphillia glandulosa, the warty jumping-slug, is a species of air-breathing land slug, a terrestrial pulmonate gastropod mollusk in the family Binneyidae.

Hemphillia glandulosa is the type species of the genus Hemphillia.

== Distribution, conservation status ==
It lives in British Columbia in Canada, where the Committee on the Status of Endangered Wildlife in Canada (COSEWIC) has assessed it as a species of special concern. The Canadian Species at Risk Act listed it in the List of Wildlife Species at Risk as being a species of special concern in Canada.
