= Niebla eburnea =

Scientific classification
- Kingdom: Fungi
- Division: Ascomycota
- Class: Lecanoromycetes
- Order: Lecanorales
- Family: Ramalinaceae
- Genus: Niebla
- Species: N. eburnea

Binomial name
- Niebla eburnea Spjut (1996)

Species of lichen

Niebla eburnea is a fruticose lichen that grows on rocks along the foggy Pacific Coast of North America, from Mendocino County in California south to near Punta Santa Rosalillita in Baja California, and also in the Channel Islands. The epithet, eburnea is in reference to the ivory like appearance of the cortex.

== Distinguishing features ==
Niebla eburnea is best recognized by the ivory-like cortex, appearing mostly smooth except for the creamy pastry-like ripples or creases, occasionally with transverse cracks; the thallus divided into subterete branches, generally half-twisted near base and often near apex, otherwise branches straight to curved, often with short elliptiform dilated segments, near apex more like the palm of the hand from which various claw-like to finger-like branchlets spread, often blackened around the base to a short distance above. Black dot-like pycnidia common along the margins, their development associated with thickened crinkled margins on the upper parts of branches and lobes. Niebla eburnea is further characterized by the presence of the lichen substance divaricatic acid, along with triterpenes and pigments concentrated near base.

The ivory-like cortex of Niebla eburnea is 65–125 μm thick, in contrast to that of Niebla cornea, 45–60 μm thick, a similar species that also differs in having the lichen substance sekikaic acid. Although Niebla eburnea can often be distinguished by its morphology, thin-layer-chromatography is a more definitive way to identify the species—by its lichen substance of divaricatic acid, with accessory triterpenes—in contrast also to Niebla disrupta, which has sekikaic acid and to species in the genus Vermilacinia that lack the depsides and have distinctive terpenes not found in Niebla; Vermilacinia laevigata and Vermilacinia procera are examples of species that can be confused with N. eburnea.

== Taxonomic history ==
Niebla eburnea was recognized as distinct from Niebla homalea before it was described. On 30 April 1985 while collecting a minimum 25 gram samples near Cerro Solo in northern Baja California for a biodiversity screening of lichens in the search of new drugs by the National Cancer Institute (NCI) Natural Products Branch to treat HIV, it was considered to represent another species that differed from Niebla homalea that had been collected near Punta Banda on the day before (29 April 1985, WBA-277, S & M 9032C, 58 g). The sample for Spjut & Marin 9047A was not submitted to the NCI. Instead approximately 40 specimens from the sample were extracted with acetone to identify the lichen substances by thin-layer chromatography. All contained divaricatic acid, with accessory triterpenes. This material then became the type collection for Niebla eburnea, described by Richard Spjut in 1996, and for exsiccati distributed later to other institutions through the ABLS Lichen Exchange that was at Arizona State University.

It may be noted that Niebla eburnea has been treated as belonging to a broad spectrum of morphological and chemical variation in Niebla homalea that includes many different species of Niebla and Vermilacinia. This does not mean that Niebla eburnea is an equal synonym (taxonomy) as erroneously indicated by some. This synonymy is based on the subjective interpretation of one taxonomic review of the genus which has many errors and inconsistencies.
