= Astragalus traskiae =

Conservation status
- Vulnerable (NatureServe)

Scientific classification
- Kingdom: Plantae
- Clade: Tracheophytes
- Clade: Angiosperms
- Clade: Eudicots
- Clade: Rosids
- Order: Fabales
- Family: Fabaceae
- Subfamily: Faboideae
- Genus: Astragalus
- Species: A. traskiae

Binomial name
- Astragalus traskiae Eastw.

Species of legume

Astragalus traskiae is a rare species of milkvetch known by the common name Trask's milkvetch. It is endemic to the southern Channel Islands of California, where it is known only from Santa Barbara Island and San Nicolas Island.

== Description ==
Astragalus traskiae is branching perennial herb with hairy stems 10 to 40 centimeters tall. The leaves are up to 10 centimeters long and made up of several hairy oval-shaped leaflets. The inflorescence holds 12 to 30 cream-colored flowers.

The fruit is a legume pod which is fleshy when new and dries to a leathery texture. The pod is generally just over a centimeter long.
