= Hemphillia skadei =

Conservation status
- Vulnerable (NatureServe)

Scientific classification
- Kingdom: Animalia
- Phylum: Mollusca
- Class: Gastropoda
- Order: Stylommatophora
- Family: Binneyidae
- Genus: Hemphillia
- Species: H. skadei

Binomial name
- Hemphillia skadei Lucid, Rankin, Espíndola, Chichester, Ehlers, Robinson and Sullivan, 2018

Species of gastropod

Hemphillia skadei, or Skade's jumping slug, is a species of air-breathing land slugs, terrestrial pulmonate gastropod mollusks in the family Binneyidae. The species name is derived from the Norse goddess Skaði, who is associated with winter and mountains, reflecting the cold and mountainous habitat of the new species.
