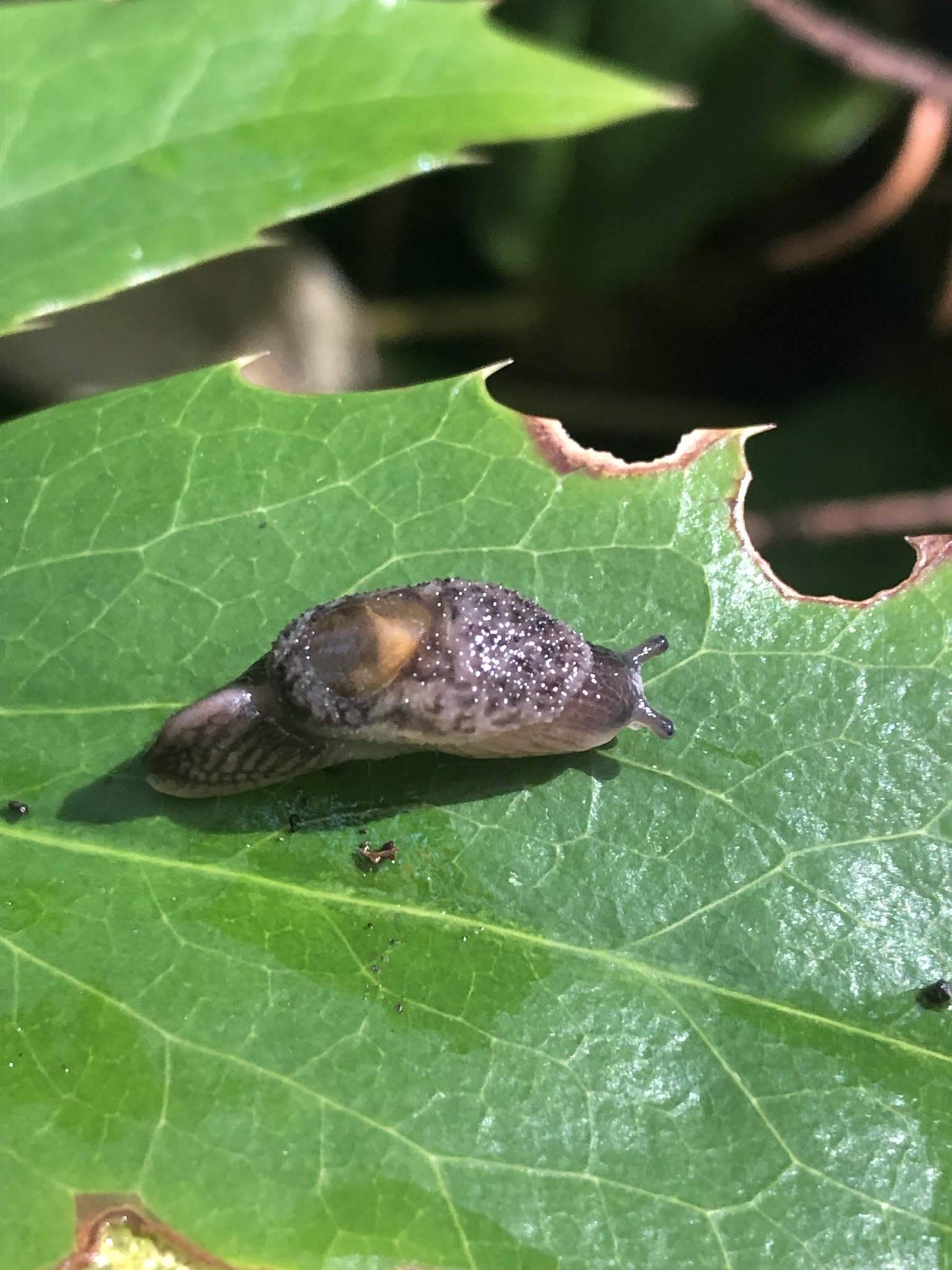

Conservation status
- Vulnerable (NatureServe)

Scientific classification
- Kingdom: Animalia
- Phylum: Mollusca
- Class: Gastropoda
- Order: Stylommatophora
- Family: Binneyidae
- Genus: Hemphillia
- Species: H. burringtoni

Binomial name
- Hemphillia burringtoni Pilsbry, 1948

Synonyms
- Hemphillia glandulosa burringtoni Pilsbry, 1948

= Hemphillia burringtoni =

Species of slug

Hemphillia burringtoni, the keeled jumping-slug, is a species of air-breathing land slugs, terrestrial pulmonate gastropod mollusks in the family Binneyidae. Its range includes Washington and Oregon in the United States.
