= Hemphillia malonei =

Conservation status
- Vulnerable (NatureServe)

Scientific classification
- Kingdom: Animalia
- Phylum: Mollusca
- Class: Gastropoda
- Order: Stylommatophora
- Family: Binneyidae
- Genus: Hemphillia
- Species: H. malonei

Binomial name
- Hemphillia malonei Pilsbry, 1917

Species of gastropod

Hemphillia malonei is a species of air-breathing land slugs, terrestrial pulmonate gastropod mollusks in the family Binneyidae. It is endemic to Mount Hood and the Columbia River Gorge of Oregon and Washington, USA.
