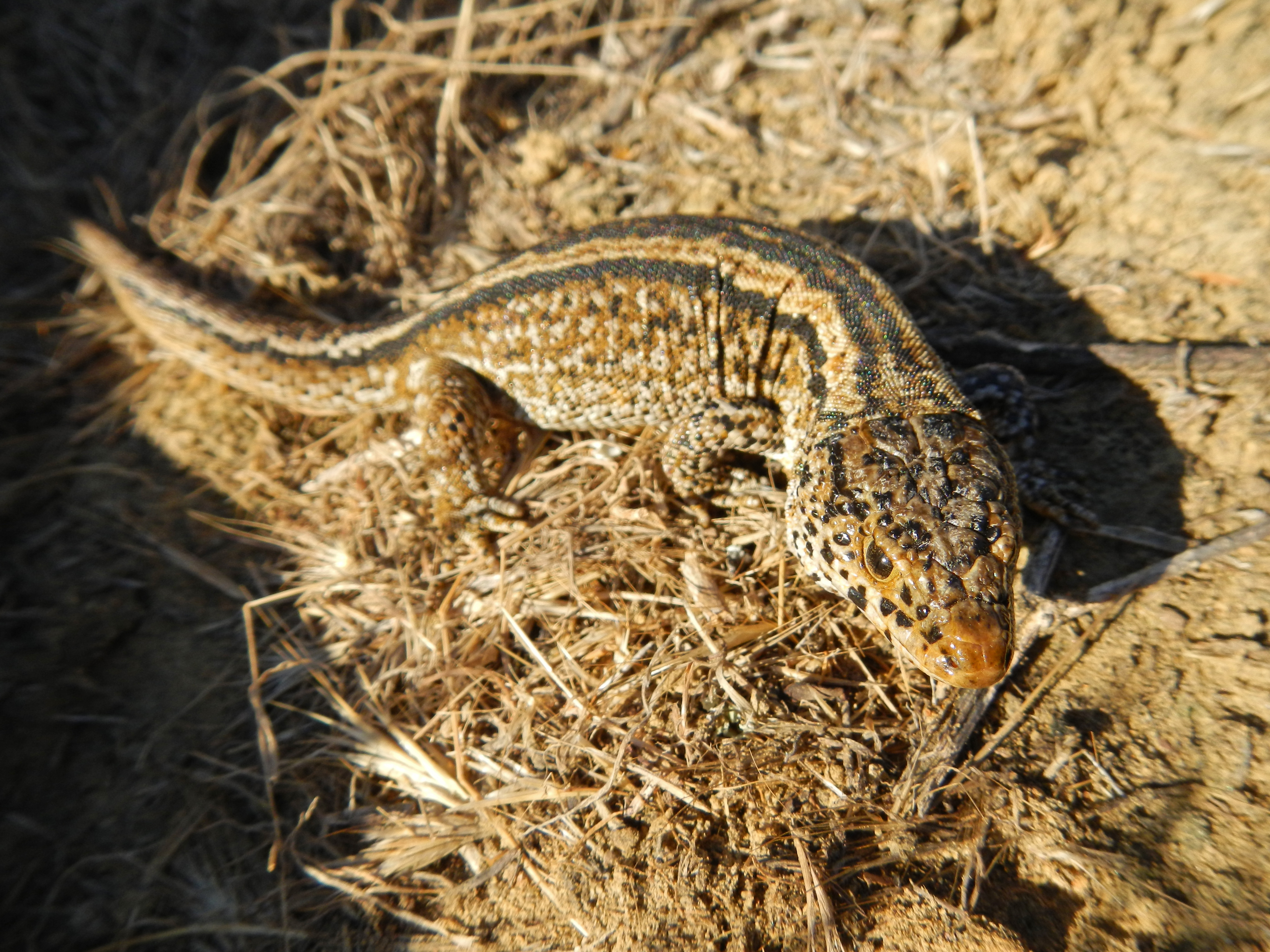

Conservation status
- Least Concern (IUCN 3.1)

- Vulnerable (NatureServe)

Scientific classification
- Kingdom: Animalia
- Phylum: Chordata
- Class: Reptilia
- Order: Squamata
- Family: Xantusiidae
- Genus: Xantusia
- Species: X. riversiana

Binomial name
- Xantusia riversiana Cope, 1883

Synonyms
- Xantusia riversiana Cope, 1883; Klauberina riversiana — Savage, 1957; Xantusia riversiana — Crother, 2000

= Island night lizard =

Species of lizard

The island night lizard (Xantusia riversiana) is a species of lizard in the family Xantusiidae. The species is native to three of the Channel Islands of California: San Nicolas Island, Santa Barbara Island, and San Clemente Island. A small population of the island night lizard also lives on Sutil Island, near Santa Barbara Island.

== Etymology ==
The specific name, riversiana, is in honor of James John Rivers (1824–1913), a London-born physician and naturalist, who was Curator of Natural History at the University of California.

== Subspecies ==
The San Clemente Island population is a subspecies which is recognized as being valid.

- Xantusia riversiana reticulata H.M. Smith, 1946 – San Clemente night lizard

== Conservation status ==
The island night lizard was listed as a threatened species under the Endangered Species Act (ESA) in the United States since 1977; the International Union for Conservation of Nature (IUCN) lists the species as vulnerable. In 2006, the US Fish and Wildlife Service, the administrating agency for the ESA, removed the San Clemente subspecies from the ESA. Better control of munitions-sparked wildfires may have been a reason. In March 2014, the US Fish and Wildlife Service removed the species from the Federal List of Threatened and Endangered Wildlife. This removal was attributed to the removal of non-native animals such as cats and goats from the islands and partnering between the US Fish and Wildlife Service and the US Navy.

== Habitat ==
The island night lizard's preferred habitat is coastal scrub made up of dense boxthorn and cacti thickets.

== Reproduction ==
Like other night lizards of the family Xantusiidae, the island night lizard is ovoviviparous, bearing live young rather than laying eggs.

== Description ==
The island night lizard is much larger than another species in the genus Xantusia, the desert night lizard (Xantusia vigilis) of southern California. The island night lizard is typically between 2.6 and 4.3 in (6.6 and 10.9 cm) in length, not including the tail. It typically lives between 11 and 13 years, but some individuals are estimated to have lived 30 years or more. Its color varies from pale ash gray and beige to brown and black. It may have a uniform, mottled, or striped pattern.

== See also ==
- Island fence lizard

== Sources ==
- "Island Night Lizard Removed from Endangered Species List Due to Recovery." Pacific Southwest Region - US Fish & Wildlife Service. United States Fish and Wildlife Service, 31 Mar. 2014. Web. 24 Apr. 2014. <http://www.fws.gov/cno/press/release.cfm?rid=594>.
