= Hemphillia dromedarius =

Conservation status
- Vulnerable (NatureServe)

- Threatened (COSEWIC)

Scientific classification
- Kingdom: Animalia
- Phylum: Mollusca
- Class: Gastropoda
- Order: Stylommatophora
- Family: Binneyidae
- Genus: Hemphillia
- Species: H. dromedarius

Binomial name
- Hemphillia dromedarius Branson, 1972

Species of gastropod

Hemphillia dromedarius, the dromedary jumping-slug, is a species of air-breathing land slugs, terrestrial pulmonate gastropod mollusks in the family Binneyidae.

== Description ==
The Hemphillia dromedarius is a large slug about 60 mm long.

== Distribution and conservation status ==
It lives in British Columbia in Canada, where the Committee on the Status of Endangered Wildlife in Canada (COSEWIC) has assessed it as a threatened species. The Canadian Species at Risk Act listed it in the List of Wildlife Species at Risk as being threatened in Canada. It is also found in Washington State.
