= Micrarionta facta =

Conservation status
- Vulnerable (IUCN 2.3)

- Critically Imperiled (NatureServe)

Scientific classification
- Kingdom: Animalia
- Phylum: Mollusca
- Class: Gastropoda
- Order: Stylommatophora
- Family: Xanthonychidae
- Genus: Micrarionta
- Species: M. facta

Binomial name
- Micrarionta facta (Newcomb, 1864)

Synonyms
- Helix facta Newcomb, 1864; Helix facta var. oleata Ancey, 1880

Species of gastropod

Micrarionta facta, the concentrated snail or Santa Barbara Island snail, is a species of air-breathing land snail, a terrestrial pulmonate gastropod mollusk in the family Helminthoglyptidae.

This species is endemic to the United States.
