= Hemphillia pantherina =

Scientific classification
- Kingdom: Animalia
- Phylum: Mollusca
- Class: Gastropoda
- Order: Stylommatophora
- Family: Binneyidae
- Genus: Hemphillia
- Species: H. pantherina

Binomial name
- Hemphillia pantherina Branson, 1975

Species of gastropod

Hemphillia pantherina is a species of air-breathing land slugs, terrestrial pulmonate gastropod mollusks in the family Binneyidae.
