= Hemphillia camelus =

Conservation status
- Apparently Secure (NatureServe)

Scientific classification
- Kingdom: Animalia
- Phylum: Mollusca
- Class: Gastropoda
- Order: Stylommatophora
- Family: Binneyidae
- Genus: Hemphillia
- Species: H. camelus

Binomial name
- Hemphillia camelus Pilsbry & Vanatta, 1897

Species of gastropod

Hemphillia camelus is a species of air-breathing land slugs, terrestrial pulmonate gastropod molluscs in the family Binneyidae.
