= San Nicolas Island =

One of the Channel Islands in California, USA

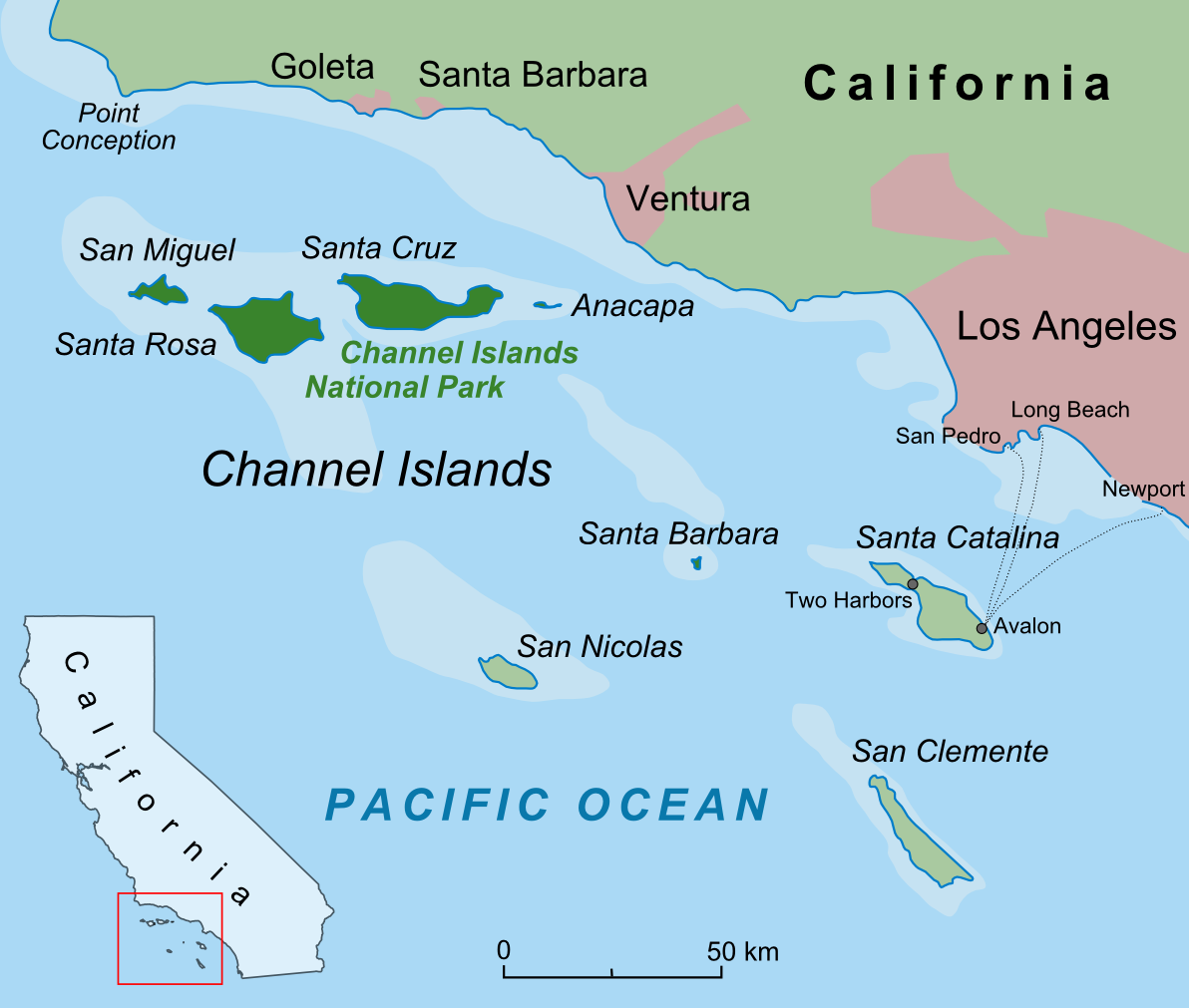
Map of Channel Islands

San Nicolas Island (Spanish: Isla de San Nicolás; Tongva: Haraasnga) is the most remote of the Channel Islands, off Southern California, 61 miles (98 km) from the nearest point on the mainland coast. It is part of Ventura County. The 14,562-acre (5,893 ha) island is currently controlled by the United States Navy and is used as a weapons testing and training facility, served by Naval Outlying Landing Field San Nicolas Island.

The uninhabited island is defined by the United States Census Bureau as Block Group 9, Census Tract 36.04 of Ventura County, California. The indigenous Nicoleño people inhabited the island until 1835. As of the 2000 U.S. census, the island has since remained officially uninhabited, though the census estimates that at least 200 military and civilian personnel live on the island at any given time. The island has a small airport, though the 10,000-foot (3,000 m) runway is the second-longest in Ventura County (slightly behind the 11,102-foot (3,384 m) one at Naval Air Station Point Mugu). Additionally, there are several buildings including telemetry reception antennas.

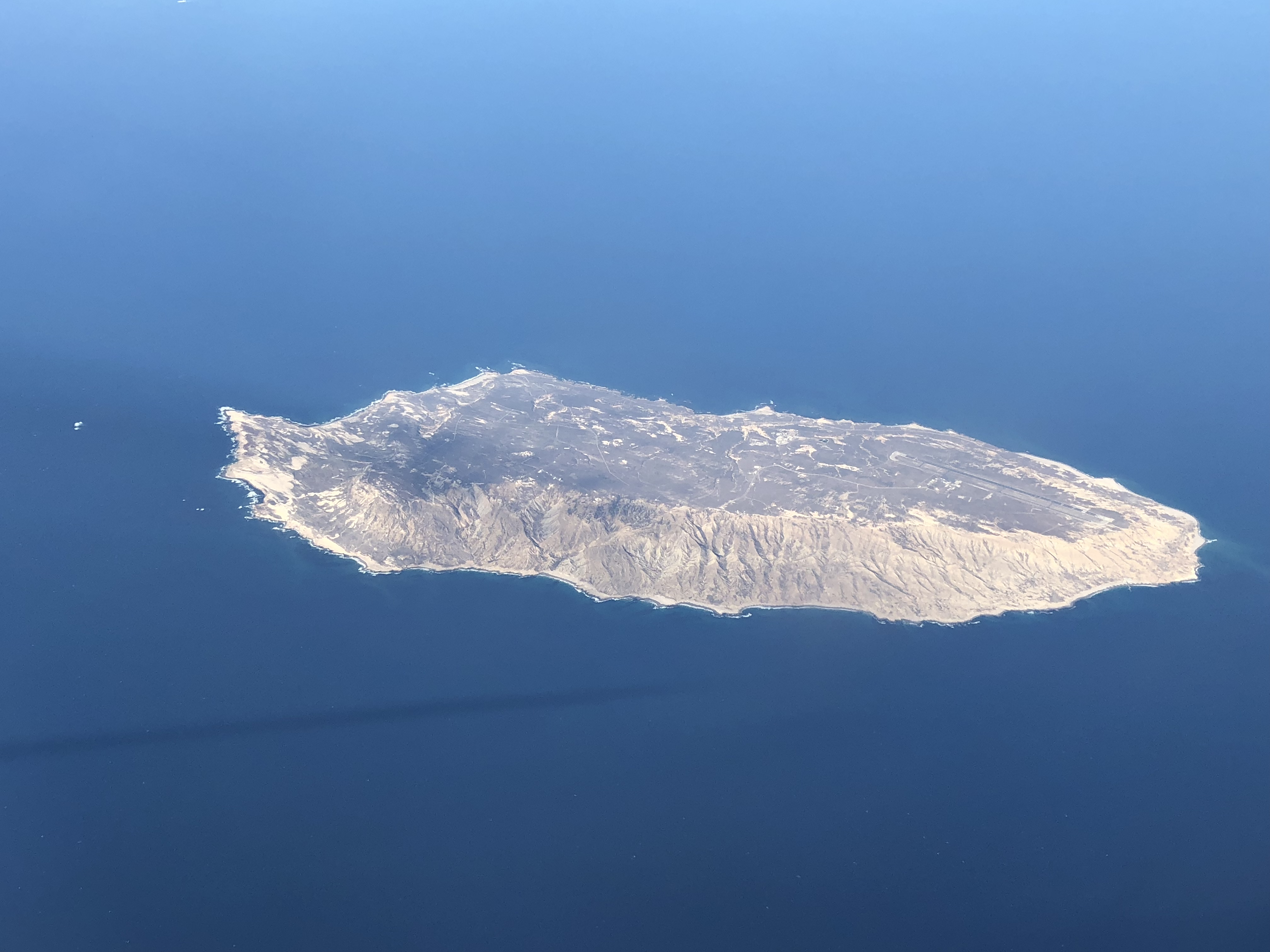
San Nicolas Island

== History ==
Archaeological evidence suggests that San Nicolas Island has been occupied by humans for at least 10,000 years. For thousands of years, San Nicolas was the home of the Nicoleño people, who were probably related to the Tongva of the mainland and Santa Catalina Island. It was named for Saint Nicholas by Spanish explorer Sebastián Vizcaíno after he sighted the island on the saint's feast day (December 6) in 1602. Russians called the island Il'men, after the name of the maritime fur trade ship that reached it, Il’mena. At the time of European contact, it was believed that there were 600 to 1200 Nicoleños present on the island.Russian and Aleut hunters frequently skirmished with the native Nicoleños, reducing the Nicoleño population significantly. The Nicoleños were forcibly removed in the early 19th century by the padres of the California mission system. Within a few years of their removal from the island, the Nicoleño people and their unique language became extinct. Nicoleño's burial sites give us insight into the religious beliefs of the island natives. Dogs, tools, and various religious paraphernalia can be found buried alongside each other. Mortars and pestles can be found destroyed or “killed” in burials. Soot residue found in such objects is like the puberty rites of boys throughout southern California.

Archaeological research shows that San Nicolas Island has been inhabited for at least 7,000 years. Indigenous populations relied heavily on marine resources, such as fish and shellfish. They developed different settlement patterns over time. The use of shell fishhooks allowed the Nicoleño to fish more effectively in the kelp bed environments surrounding the island, and their widespread production on San Nicolas Island points to the role the island played in broader regional trade networks.

In 1814, a Russian American Company hunting party, comprised primarily of Aleuts, reportedly carried out a massacre of Nicoleño men on the island, believed to be in retaliation for the death of one of their hunters. These clashes were tied to growing competition over sea otter hunting along the California coast.

=== Excavations ===
Excavations at the Tule Creek Village site recovered over 126 sandstone tools whose surfaces contained shell residue, identifying them as tools used in making the circular abalone shell fishhooks characteristic of Nicoleño material culture. The remains of Juana Maria's whale-bone and brush shelter were rediscovered on July 25, 1939, by Dr. Arthur Woodward of the Los Angeles County Museum during an archaeological expedition to the Channel Islands. The site, located on the high ridge at the western end of the island, consisted of 19 whale bones in a fair state of preservation. The location closely matched George Nidever's original 1853 account, which overlooked a sea lion rookery and coastal springs that Juana Maria had relied on for food and water. During a follow-up visit in December 1940, Woodward also recovered a chert knife blade, fish hook blanks, and a schist bead near the hut site.

=== Lone Woman of San Nicolas Island ===
The most famous resident of San Nicolas Island was the "Lone Woman of San Nicolas Island", christened Juana Maria; her birth name was never known to anyone on the mainland. She was left behind (explanations for this vary) when the rest of the Nicoleños were removed from the island and brought to the mainland. She resided on the island alone for 18 years before she was found by Captain George Nidever and his crew in 1853 and taken to Santa Barbara. Her story is famously fictionalized in the award-winning children's novel Island of the Blue Dolphins by Scott O'Dell. However, recent research suggests that she may not have been the last living member of the Nicoleño people. Archival records from early 19th-century Los Angeles show that several Nicoleños were moved to the mainland and may have continued to live there.

The few possessions Juana Maria brought to the mainland after her rescue were reportedly sent to Rome. The exception was a twined basketry water bottle, which made its way to the California Academy of Sciences. Unfortunately, this basket which was one of the last remaining physical connections to Juana Maria and Nicoleño material culture, was destroyed in the fire caused by the 1906 San Francisco earthquake. A photograph of the basket was later published in 1960 by Robert Heizer, serving as the only remaining visual record of the artifact.

During the winter of 2009 to 2010, a cache feature was discovered eroding from a sea cliff on the northwest coast of San Nicolas Island, consisting of a whale rib placed over two small redwood boxes holding over 200 artifacts. The cache is believed to have belonged to Juana Maria or one of the few Nicoleño who left the island in 1835.

Among the artifacts recovered were Nicoleño-style knives, steatite ornaments, and abalone shell fishhooks, as well as Native Alaskan harpoons and Euro-American items, including a brass button and glass bifaces. The variety of objects points to a period of considerable cultural exchange on the island during the early 19th century.

=== Whaling ===
The steam-schooner California and its two whale catchers Hawk and Port Saunders operated off San Nicolas in 1932 and 1937, catching about 30 fin whales off the island from October to early December in the former year.

Archaeological and historical evidence suggests that the island’s Indigenous residents used whale remains for daily life and construction, in addition to later commercial whaling. Whale ribs and other large bones were used as part of the shelter's framework associated with the “Lone Woman,” according to accounts from the 19th and early 20th centuries.

=== Munitions testing ===
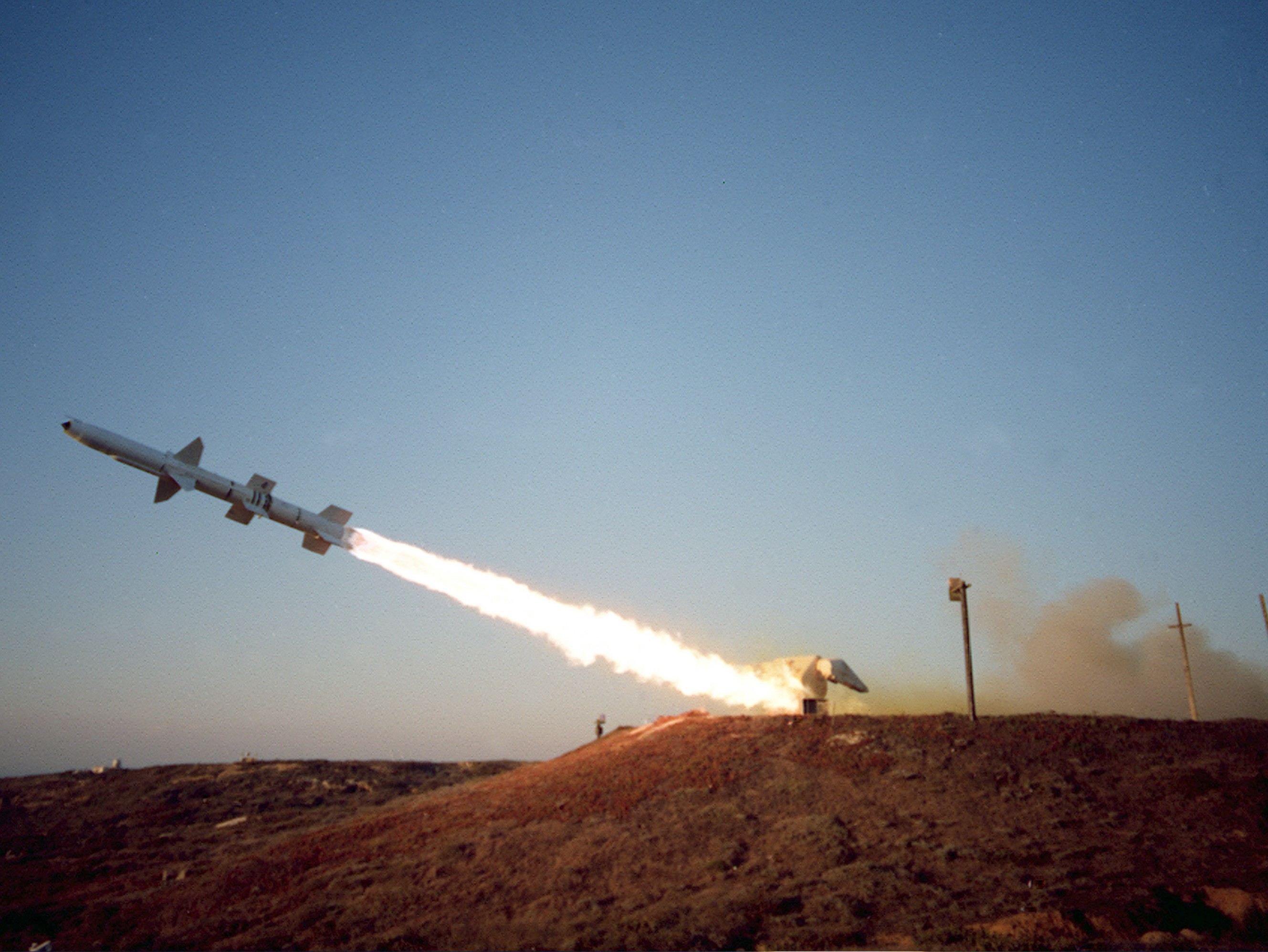
A U.S. Navy MQM-8G Vandal missile firing from San Nicolas Island, California (US), in 1999

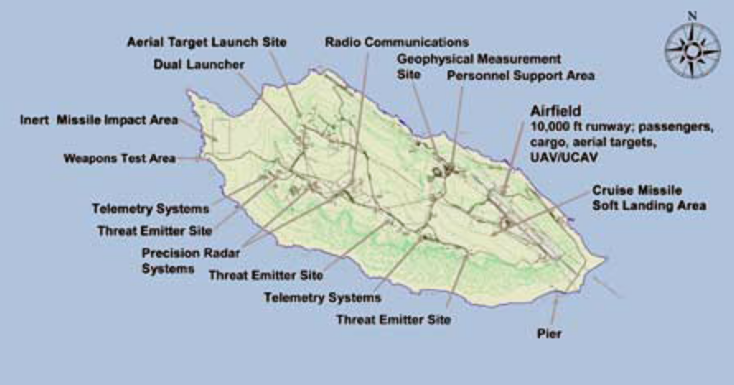
U.S. Navy facilities on San Nicolas Island, 2009

San Nicolas Island was one of eight candidate sites to detonate the first atomic bomb before White Sands Proving Ground was selected for the Trinity nuclear test. Between 1957 and 1973, and in 2004 and again in 2010, U.S. military research rockets were launched from San Nicolas Island. The launchpad was situated at 33°15′51″N 119°32′20″W. It remains part of the Pacific Missile Range.

San Nicolas Island currently serves as a detachment of Naval Base Ventura County. In addition to the Port Hueneme and Point Mugu, San Nicolas Island is military-owned and -operated.

The island belongs to the U.S. Navy and is part of the Naval Air Center's Sea Test Range associated with the Naval Air Warfare Center, Weapons Division at Point Mugu. The island has a 10,000-foot (3,000 m) runway, communications and missile tracking equipment, and missile and target launch areas. There are also mock cities used for urban warfare training.

== Geography ==
The highest point is Jackson Hill, with an elevation of 907 feet (276 m) above sea level. San Nicolas Island is an uplifted anticline composed primarily of Eocene sandstone and shale. It was formed by faulting, marine erosion, and the Pleistocene sea-level changes that created multiple marine terraces. Longshore currents have shaped the island’s coastline, resulting in a shifting sand spit at the southwest end. The island is bordered by a broad northern shelf and a narrower southern shelf.

=== Geology ===
Composed primarily of Eocene sandstone and shale, much of the island also has marine terrace deposits of Pleistocene age, indicating that it was probably completely submerged at that time. The entire western part of the island is covered with reddish-brown eolian dune deposits laid down during the early Holocene. In some places these deposits are more than 10 meters (33 ft) deep. Small quantities of volcanic rocks (primarily andesite) exist on the southeast end of the island.

Stone available to natives for tool making on San Nicolas Island was largely limited to metavolcanic (including porphyritic metavolcanic) and metasedimentary (mainly quartzite) rock. The metavolcanics are found in the form of cobbles within conglomerates and cobble-bearing mudstones. This material is dense and not easily workable.

=== Climate ===
Under the Köppen climate classification, San Nicolas Island features a semi-arid climate (Köppen BSk) with mediterranean characteristics. Winters are mild with an average temperature of 55.3 °F (12.9 °C) in February, the coolest month, and is the season where most of the precipitation falls. Summers are dry and warm with an average of 64.7 °F (18.2 °C) in September, indicating a seasonal lag. Temperatures above 90 °F (32.2 °C) are rare, occurring on 2 days per summer. The average annual precipitation is 8.58 inches (218 mm), with the wettest month being February and the driest month being August. On average, there are 36 days with measurable precipitation.

Climate data for San Nicolas Island
Month	Jan	Feb	Mar	Apr	May	Jun	Jul	Aug	Sep	Oct	Nov	Dec	Year
Record high °F (°C)	83 (28)	83 (28)	78 (26)	96 (36)	100 (38)	91 (33)	91 (33)	95 (35)	103 (39)	100 (38)	88 (31)	82 (28)	103 (39)
Mean daily maximum °F (°C)	61.3 (16.3)	60.5 (15.8)	61.2 (16.2)	63.2 (17.3)	64.7 (18.2)	66.3 (19.1)	69.1 (20.6)	70.7 (21.5)	71.1 (21.7)	69.7 (20.9)	66.5 (19.2)	62.4 (16.9)	65.6 (18.7)
Daily mean °F (°C)	55.6 (13.1)	55.3 (12.9)	56.0 (13.3)	56.9 (13.8)	58.9 (14.9)	60.4 (15.8)	62.9 (17.2)	64.3 (17.9)	64.7 (18.2)	63.2 (17.3)	60.5 (15.8)	57.1 (13.9)	59.6 (15.3)
Mean daily minimum °F (°C)	50.1 (10.1)	50.2 (10.1)	50.6 (10.3)	50.7 (10.4)	53.0 (11.7)	54.5 (12.5)	56.6 (13.7)	57.9 (14.4)	58.4 (14.7)	56.7 (13.7)	54.5 (12.5)	51.8 (11.0)	53.7 (12.1)
Record low °F (°C)	36 (2)	37 (3)	38 (3)	40 (4)	41 (5)	47 (8)	44 (7)	46 (8)	48 (9)	40 (4)	42 (6)	38 (3)	36 (2)
Average precipitation inches (mm)	1.67 (42)	2.00 (51)	1.34 (34)	0.58 (15)	0.05 (1.3)	0.02 (0.51)	0.01 (0.25)	0.06 (1.5)	0.17 (4.3)	0.26 (6.6)	0.58 (15)	1.84 (47)	8.58 (218)
Average precipitation days (≥ 0.01 in)	6	7	4	5	3	1	1	0	1	2	3	6	36
Source: WRCC (normals 1933–1976)

=== Biota ===
==== Flora ====
There is little ecological diversity on San Nicolas Island. The island was heavily grazed by sheep until they were removed in 1943. Overgrazing and erosion have removed much of the topsoil from the island. Despite the degradation, three endemic plants are found on the island: Astragalus traskiae, Eriogonum grande subspecies timorum, and Lomatium insulare.

The dominant plant community on the island is coastal bluff scrubland, with giant coreopsis (Coreopsis gigantea) and coyote brush (Baccharis pilularis) being the most visible components. The few trees present today, including California fan palms (Washingtonia filifera), were introduced in modern times. However, early written accounts and the remains of ancient plants in the form of calcareous root casts indicate that, prior to 1860, brush covered a portion of the island.

The absence of grazing animals on San Nicolas Island serves to protect the highly developed biological soil crusts that cover much of the island's land area. Although few studies on the island's microbial biodiversity have been conducted, preliminary evidence suggests San Nicolas holds significant algal diversity. The island's terrestrial cyanobacteria appear to be particularly diverse, and several new endemic species have been recently described.

==== Fauna ====
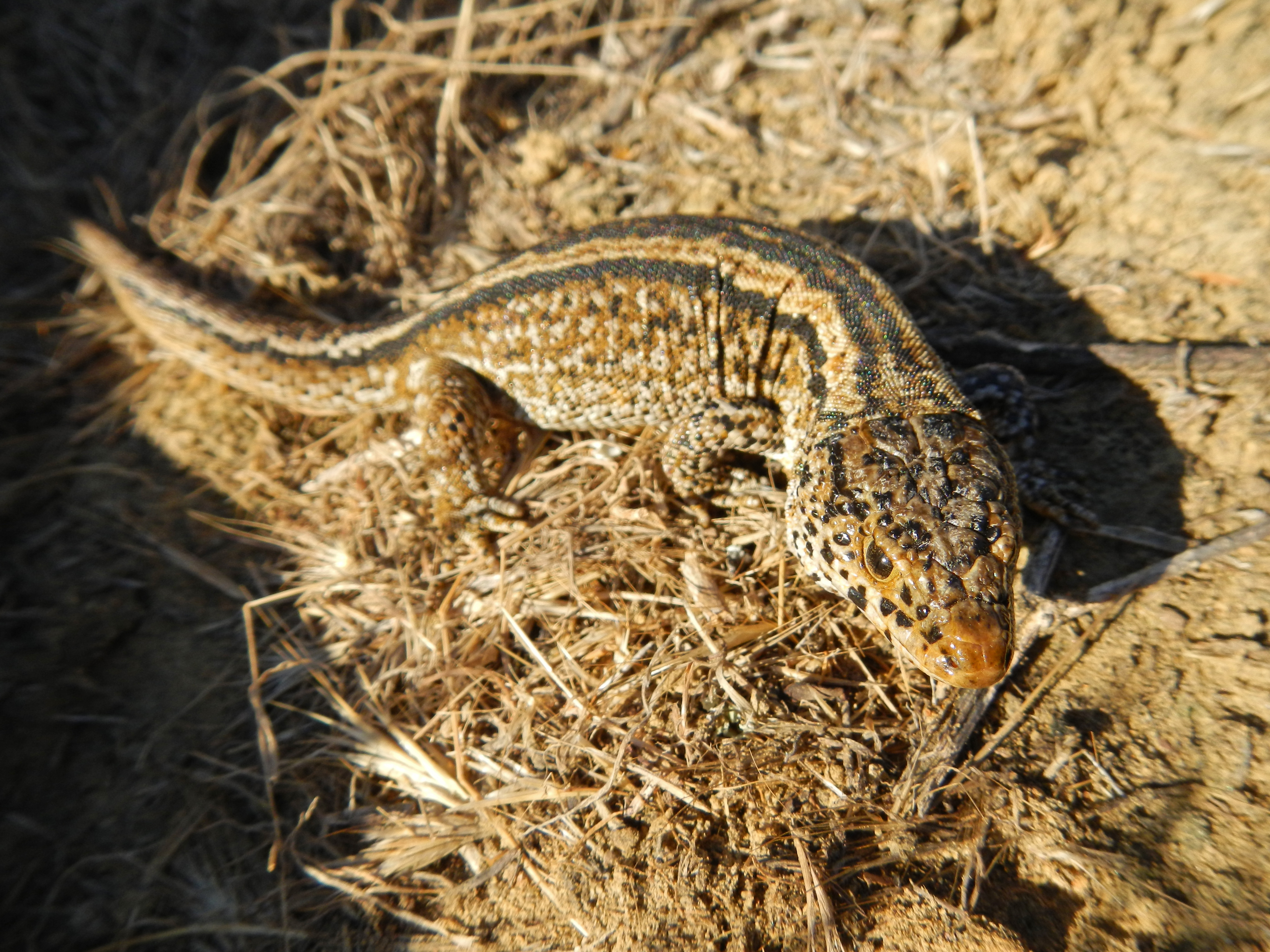
Island night lizard

There are only three species of endemic land vertebrates on the island: the island night lizard (Xantusia riversiana), deer mouse (Peromyscus maniculatus exterus), and island fox (Urocyon littoralis dickeyi). Two other reptiles, the common side-blotched lizard (Uta stansburiana) and the southern alligator lizard (Elgaria multicarinatus), were at one time thought to be endemic, but an analysis of mitochondrial DNA indicates that both species were most likely introduced in recent times.

More than 10 endemic molluscs are known only from San Nicolas Island. These are Binneya notabilis, Catinella rehderi, Haplotrema duranti duranti, Micrarionta feralis, Micrarionta micromphala, M. opuntia, M. sodalis, Nearctula rowellii longii, Sterkia clementina, and Xerarionta tryoni (ssp. tryoni and hemphilli).

Large numbers of birds can be found on San Nicolas Island. Two species are of particular ecological concern: the western gull (Larus occidentalis) and Brandt's cormorant (Phalacrocorax penicillatus), which are threatened by island foxes.

== Conservation and restoration ==
The common housecat was one of the greatest threats to the island's wildlife until they were eradicated from the island by the US Navy with the support of Island Conservation and the Humane Society of the United States in 2009. The cats killed cormorants, gulls, and the island night lizard and competed with the endemic Island fox. The cats arrived on the island before 1952, probably brought by navy officers who worked there. All cats were relocated to a specially prepared habitat in Ramona, in San Diego County, with the assistance of the Humane Society of the United States. Cats were officially declared eradicated in 2012. The eradication effort took 18 months and cost $3 million.

Channel Islands Restoration (CIR) works with the U.S. Navy on restoration projects throughout San Nicolas Island. Together they have rebuilt and expanded an old native plant nursery. CIR has been eradicating several invasive species on the island, including Sahara mustard from the habitat of Cryptantha traskiae, a threatened plant in the Borage family. CIR has worked to restore San Nicolas Night Lizard (Xantusia riversiana riversiana) habitat with extensive plantings of prickly pear cactus (Opuntia littoralis). The shelter-providing habitat has helped to increase night lizard populations. This night lizard species is endemic to only three of the eight Channel Islands and was recently removed from the endangered species list due to conservation efforts.
