= Hemphillia danielsi =

Conservation status
- Vulnerable (NatureServe)

Scientific classification
- Kingdom: Animalia
- Phylum: Mollusca
- Class: Gastropoda
- Order: Stylommatophora
- Family: Binneyidae
- Genus: Hemphillia
- Species: H. danielsi

Binomial name
- Hemphillia danielsi Vanatta, 1914

Species of gastropod

Hemphillia danielsi, the marbled jumping-slug, is a species of air-breathing land slugs, terrestrial pulmonate gastropod mollusks in the family Binneyidae.
