= Sutil =

Sutil may refer to:

- Adrian Sutil, German Formula One racing driver
- Francisco Sutil, Spanish professional football player
- Sutil (ship), a Spanish ship
- Sutil (album), an album by pop singer Charytín
- Sutil Channel, a channel in British Columbia
- Cape Sutil, the northernmost point of Vancouver Island
- Sutil Island, a named rock near Santa Barbara Island
