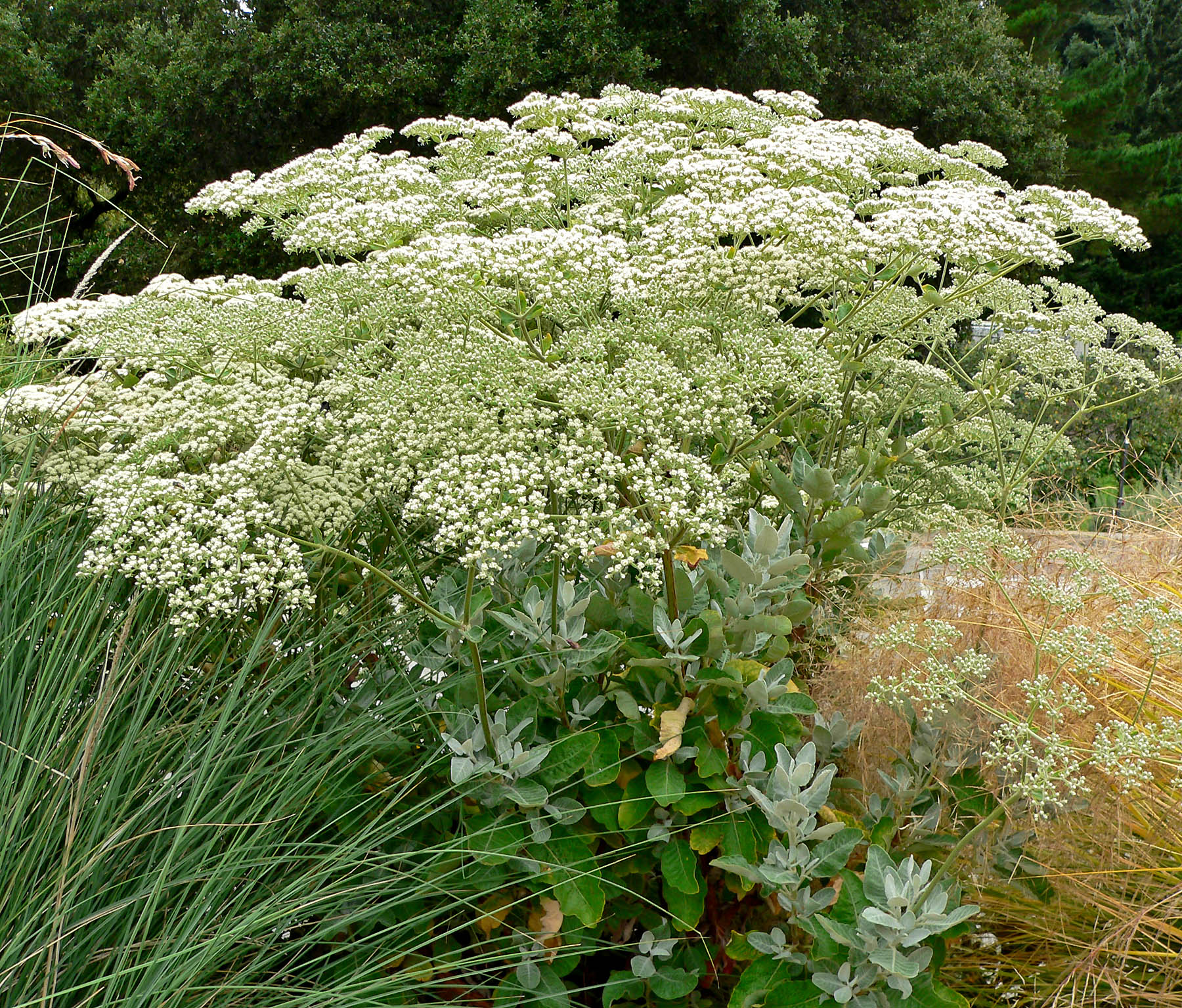

Scientific classification
- Kingdom: Plantae
- Clade: Tracheophytes
- Clade: Angiosperms
- Clade: Eudicots
- Order: Caryophyllales
- Family: Polygonaceae
- Genus: Eriogonum
- Species: E. giganteum

Binomial name
- Eriogonum giganteum S.Wats.

= Eriogonum giganteum =

St. Catherine's lace

Species of wild buckwheat

Eriogonum giganteum, with the common name St. Catherine's lace, is a species of wild buckwheat in Southern California.

== Distribution ==
This shrub is endemic to the Channel Islands of California. It is found in the Coastal sage scrub plant association habitat of the Coastal sage and chaparral sub-ecoregion.

One variety of this geographically limited species, Eriogonum giganteum var. compactum or the Santa Barbara Island buckwheat, is endemic to and particularly rare on Santa Barbara Island.

== Description ==
Eriogonum giganteum is variable in size, from 0.5 metres (1.6 ft) in height and width, to a sprawling or rounded bush over 3 metres (9.8 ft) high and wide.

The leathery, woolly, oval-shaped leaves are gray, and clustered sparsely along the mostly naked branches. It is evergreen.

The plant flowers with each inflorescence rising boldly above the foliage on strong stalks. The broad domed blooms are covered densely in carpets of clustered tiny white flowers, that fade to rust red. Each hairy flower is only a few millimeters across.

=== Varieties ===
Named varieties of the species currently include:

- Eriogonum giganteum var. compactum — Santa Barbara Island buckwheat, endemic to/rare on Santa Barbara Island.
- Eriogonum giganteum var. formosum — San Clemente Island buckwheat, native to San Clemente Island.
- Eriogonum giganteum var. giganteum — Santa Catalina Island buckwheat, native to Santa Catalina Island.

== Cultivation ==
Eriogonum giganteum is cultivated as an ornamental plant, for use in native plant, drought tolerant, and wildlife gardens, and in natural landscaping design projects. With its coarser texture and semi-open form, it can be a good background plant in gardens.

It is a honey plant that supports a numerous diversity and count of pollinators when blooming. It especially supports pollinator insect species native to California, as most of the state's native buckwheats do. It is a very important butterfly nectar source plant.

The flowers, leaves, and seeds are all used by many smaller animals.
