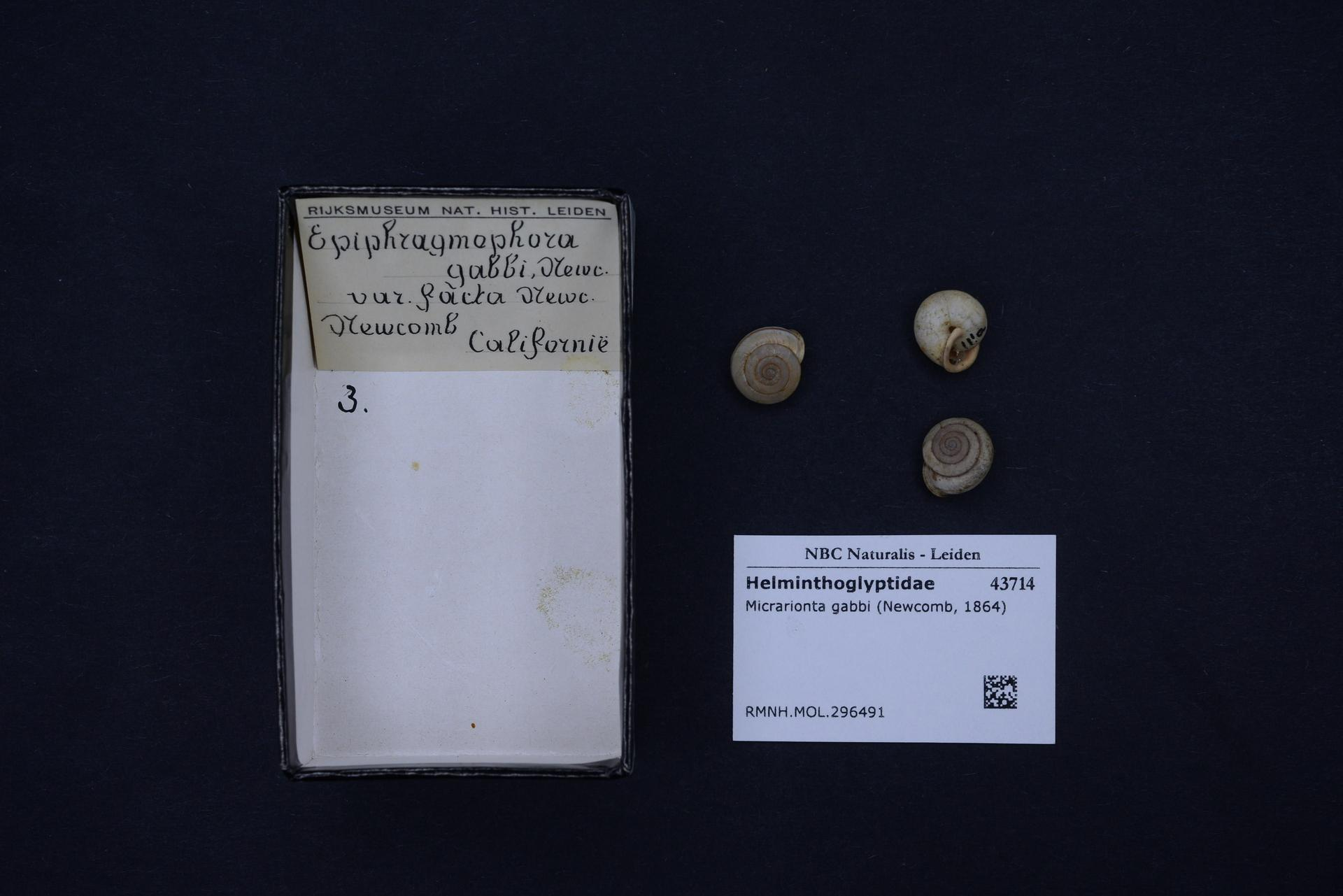

Conservation status
- Vulnerable (IUCN 2.3)

- Critically Imperiled (NatureServe)

Scientific classification
- Kingdom: Animalia
- Phylum: Mollusca
- Class: Gastropoda
- Order: Stylommatophora
- Family: Xanthonychidae
- Genus: Micrarionta
- Species: M. gabbii

Binomial name
- Micrarionta gabbii (Newcomb, 1864)

Synonyms
- Helix gabbii Newcomb, 1864; Micrarionta gabbii maxima Pilsbry, 1939

= Micrarionta gabbii =

Gabb's snail

Species of gastropod

Micrarionta gabbii, the San Clemente Island snail or Gabb's snail, is a species of air-breathing land snail, a terrestrial pulmonate gastropod mollusk in the family Helminthoglyptidae.

This species is endemic to the United States. Its natural habitat is temperate shrubland. It is threatened by habitat loss.
