= Santa Barbara shelled slug =

Conservation status
- Data Deficient (IUCN 2.3)

- Critically Imperiled (NatureServe)

Scientific classification
- Kingdom: Animalia
- Phylum: Mollusca
- Class: Gastropoda
- Order: Stylommatophora
- Family: Binneyidae
- Genus: Binneya
- Species: B. notabilis

Binomial name
- Binneya notabilis J. G. Cooper, 1863

Species of gastropod

The Santa Barbara shelled slug or slug snail, scientific name Binneya notabilis, is a species of air-breathing land slug, a shell-less terrestrial gastropod mollusk in the family Binneyidae.

== Distribution ==
This species is found only in the United States.
