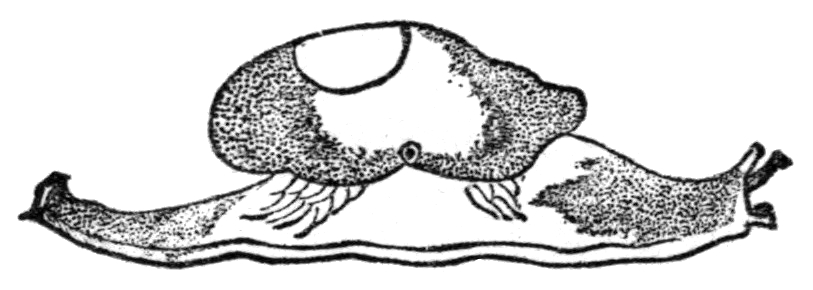
- Hemphillia glandulosa

Scientific classification
- Kingdom: Animalia
- Phylum: Mollusca
- Class: Gastropoda
- Order: Stylommatophora
- Family: Binneyidae
- Genus: Hemphillia; Thomas Bland & Binney, 1872

= Hemphillia =

Genus of gastropods

Hemphillia is a genus of air-breathing land slugs, terrestrial pulmonate gastropod mollusks in the family Binneyidae.

The generic name Hemphillia is in honor of an American malacologist Henry Hemphill (1830–1914).

At least some species of this genus are known as jumping slugs due to their behavior when threatened. At such times, they "jump" by coiling up and straightening out repeatedly in rapid succession.

== Species ==
Species in the genus Hemphillia include:

- Hemphillia burringtoni
- Hemphillia camelus
- Hemphillia danielsi
- Hemphillia dromedarius
- Hemphillia glandulosa - the type species
- Hemphillia malonei
- Hemphillia pantherina
- Hemphillia skadei

== Gallery ==
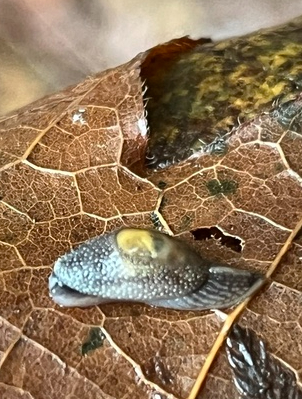
a live Hemphillia found in leaflitter in Rochester, WA

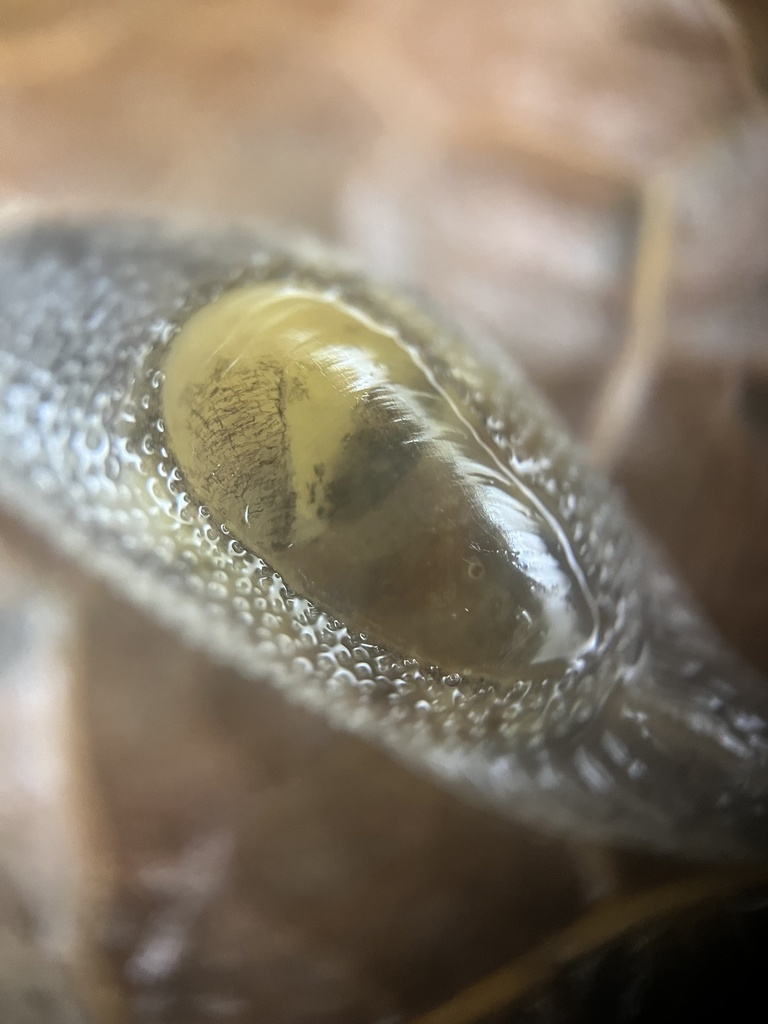
The "Shell" of the jumping slug
