= Sutil Island =

Small island off the California coast

Coordinates: 33°27′51″N 119°02′54″W

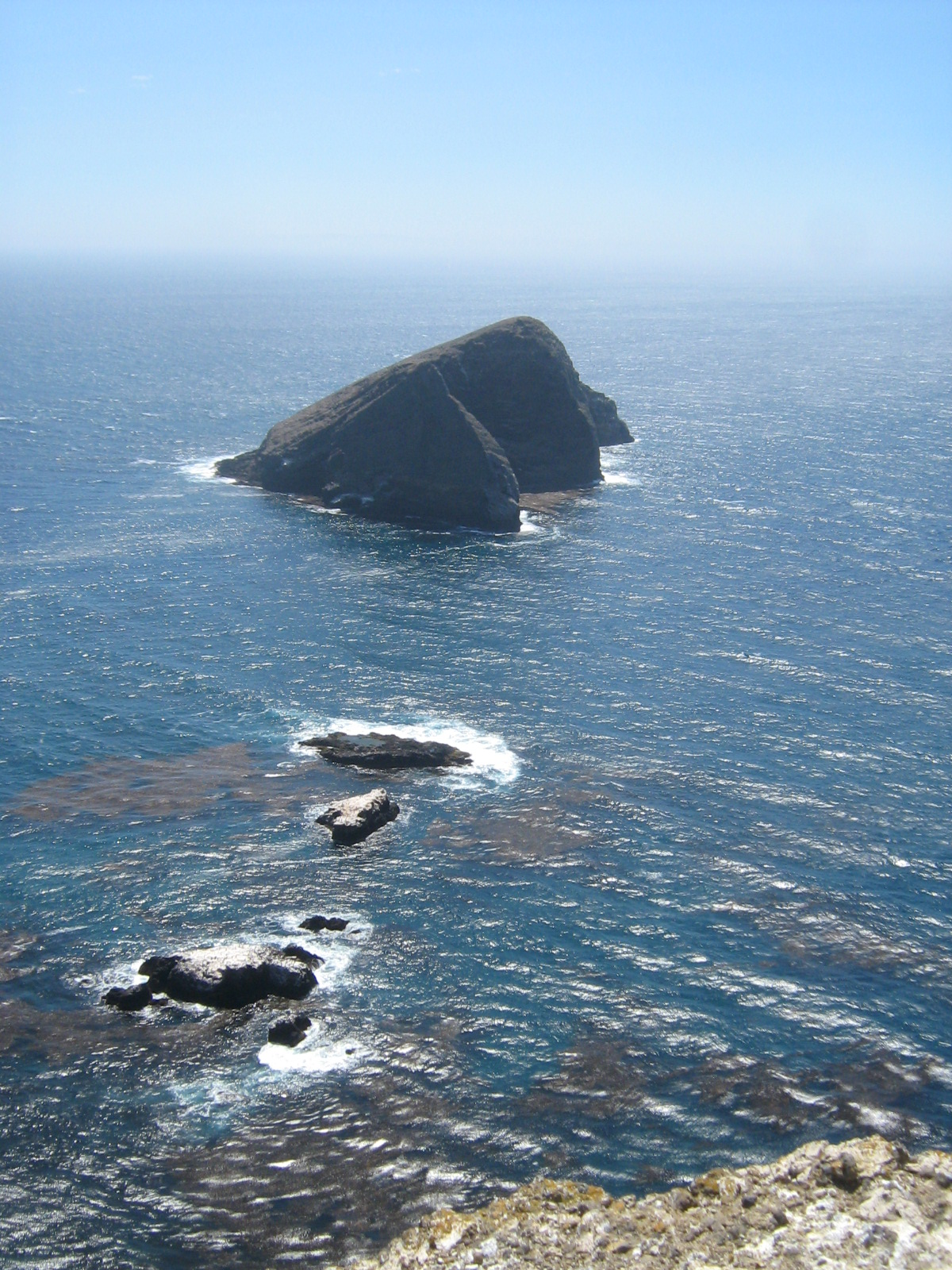
Sutil Island as seen from Santa Barbara Island

Sutil Island, formerly known as Gull Island, is a 13-acre rocky islet in the Channel Islands National Park, California, United States. It is named after a ship of the Galiano expedition of 1792. It is located 0.4 miles southwest of Santa Barbara Island. It is 300 feet high. The island is an important wildlife habitat, particularly for seabirds. It is an important nesting site for Brandt's cormorant and the endangered Guadalupe murrelet, and is the only breeding site on the pacific coast of the United States for the black storm petrel. It is also home to the island night lizard, which is only found on Sutil, Santa Barbara, San Nicolas and San Clemente islands. In 2019, biologists with the National Park Service found evidence of a brown booby chick having hatched on the island, part of a general northward migration of the bird.
