= Binneya =

Scientific classification
- Kingdom: Animalia
- Phylum: Mollusca
- Class: Gastropoda
- Order: Stylommatophora
- Family: Binneyidae
- Genus: Binneya; Cooper, 1863

Genus of gastropods

Binneya is a genus of air-breathing land slugs, shell-less terrestrial gastropod mollusks in the family Binneyidae.

Binneya is the type genus of the family Binneyidae.

== Species ==
Species within the genus Binneya include:

- Binneya notabilis J.G.Cooper, 1863 - Santa Barbara shelled slug
- Binneya guadalupensis Pilsbury, 1927 - Guadelupe shelled slug
