= Niebla cornea =

Scientific classification
- Kingdom: Fungi
- Division: Ascomycota
- Class: Lecanoromycetes
- Order: Lecanorales
- Family: Ramalinaceae
- Genus: Niebla
- Species: N. cornea

Binomial name
- Niebla cornea Spjut (1996)

Species of lichen

Niebla cornea is a fruticose lichen that grows along the fog regions of the Pacific Coast of North America from near Morro Bay, California to near Punta Santa Rosalillita in Baja California. The epithet, cornea, is in reference to the cortex appearing hard and close textured.

== Distinguishing features ==
Niebla cornea is recognized by the thallus divided into broad strap-like branches that arise from a central basal attachment point, usually with a well marked blackened area extending a short distance above the base; the branches are rather simple or irregularly divided into secondary branches, occasionally with small terminal clusters of often 4 cup-shaped apothecia, or when no apothecia are present, the branches often terminate in short lobes of unequal length that develop as an extension of the branch margins. Black dot-like pycnidia are scattered along the margins of the upper parts of branches and lobes and occasionally on reticulate ridges, but forms with thick branches and undeveloped apothecia are more densely covered with pycnidia along branch margins. Niebla cornea is further characterized by the presence of the lichen substance sekikaic acid, along with triterpenes and pigments concentrated near base.

The firm cortex of Niebla cornea is surprisingly only 45–60 μm thick, in contrast to that of N. eburnea, 65–125 μm thick, a similar species that also differs by having divaricatic acid. Although Niebla cornea can often be distinguished by its morphology, thin-layer-chromatography is usually a more effective way to identify the lichen substance (sekikaic acid) that distinguishes the species from others such as Niebla eburnea, Niebla homalea, and Vermilacinia laevigata, a less destructive procedure that only requires a tiny fragment from a thallus in contrast to breaking off a lobe of the thallus to see the chondroid stands that characterizes the genus Niebla.

== Taxonomic history ==
Niebla cornea was recognized as a result of conducting a taxonomic revision of the genus, starting in 1986. For many years it had been included under a very broad species concept, Niebla homalea, which has since been distinguished by its narrower regularly twisted branches. Niebla cornea has also been confused with Vermilacinia laevigata, which has a different terpenoid chemistry, a different type of cortex, and lacks chondroid stands in the medulla. The epithet was also chosen to further contrast its distinction from that of N. eburnea that was first recognized in May 1985 as being different from N. homalea while collecting a sample for anti-HIV screening in northern Baja California.
