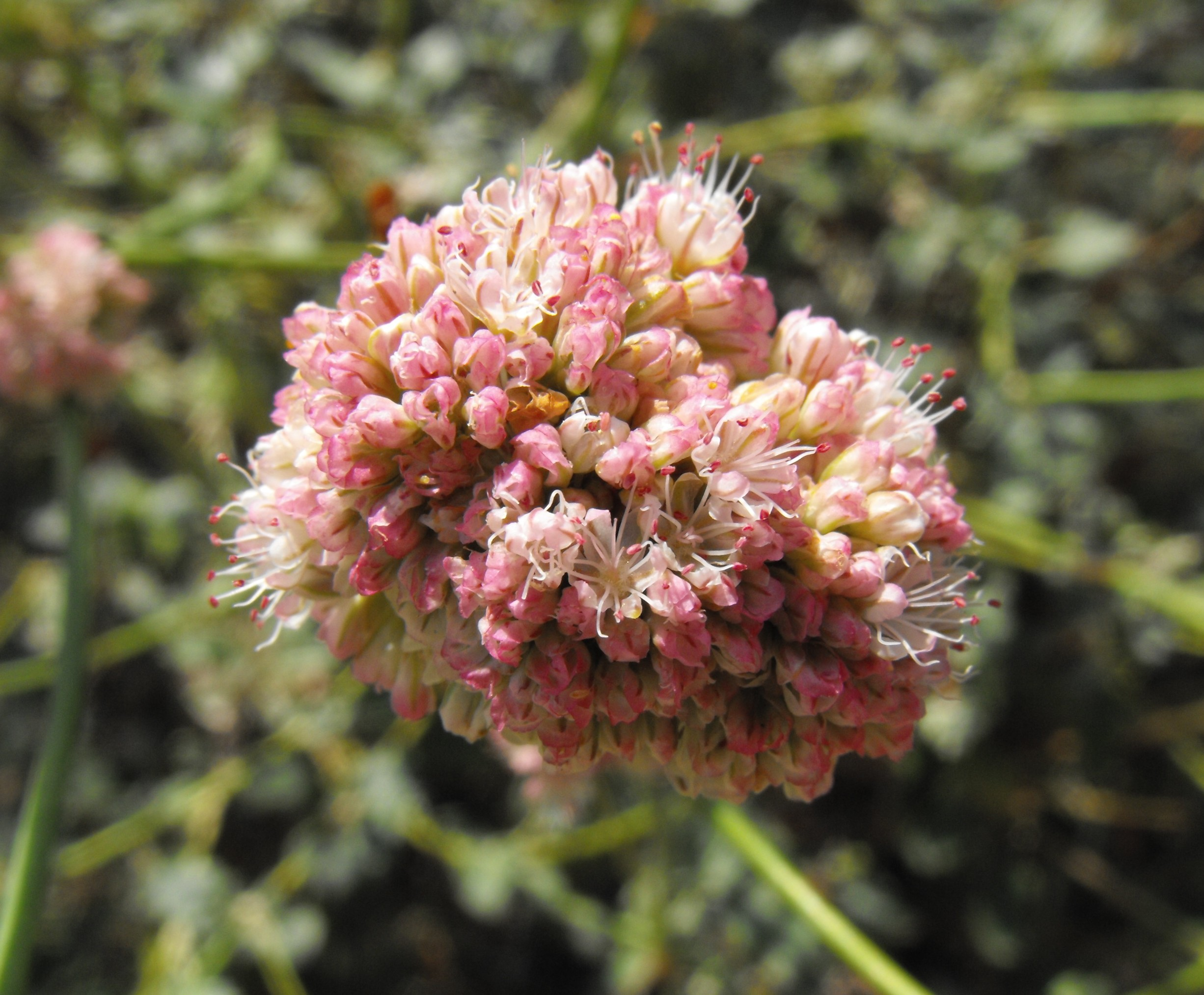
- var. rubescens

Scientific classification
- Kingdom: Plantae
- Clade: Tracheophytes
- Clade: Angiosperms
- Clade: Eudicots
- Order: Caryophyllales
- Family: Polygonaceae
- Genus: Eriogonum
- Species: E. grande

Binomial name
- Eriogonum grande Greene

= Eriogonum grande =

Species of wild buckwheat

Eriogonum grande is a species of wild buckwheat known by the common name redflower buckwheat. It is native to northwestern Baja California, as well as the Channel Islands of California. It is a mat-forming perennial herb producing tall, stout inflorescences of white, pink, or red flowers. Leaves are located mainly at the base of the plant and are wavy along the edges and up to 10 centimeters long.

There are three varieties of this species:

- E. g. var. grande - Pacific Island wild buckwheat, redflower buckwheat - found on several of the Channel Islands
- E. g. var. rubescens - San Miguel Island buckwheat, red-flowered Pacific Island wild buckwheat - found on the northern Channel Islands
- E. g. var. timorum - San Nicolas Island buckwheat - rare and endemic to San Nicolas Island
