= Micrarionta opuntia =

Conservation status
- Vulnerable (IUCN 2.3)

- Critically Imperiled (NatureServe)

Scientific classification
- Kingdom: Animalia
- Phylum: Mollusca
- Class: Gastropoda
- Order: Stylommatophora
- Family: Xanthonychidae
- Genus: Micrarionta
- Species: M. opuntia

Binomial name
- Micrarionta opuntia Roth, 1975

Species of gastropod

Micrarionta opuntia, known as the prickly pear island snail, pricklypear islandsnail, or prickly pear snail, is a species of land snail in the family Xanthonychidae. It is endemic to California, first formally described in 1975.

The type locality is northeastern San Nicolas Island, at the base of a prickly pear (Opuntia littoralis), in a small depression. It reaches around 10.5 mm (13/32 in) in diameter.
