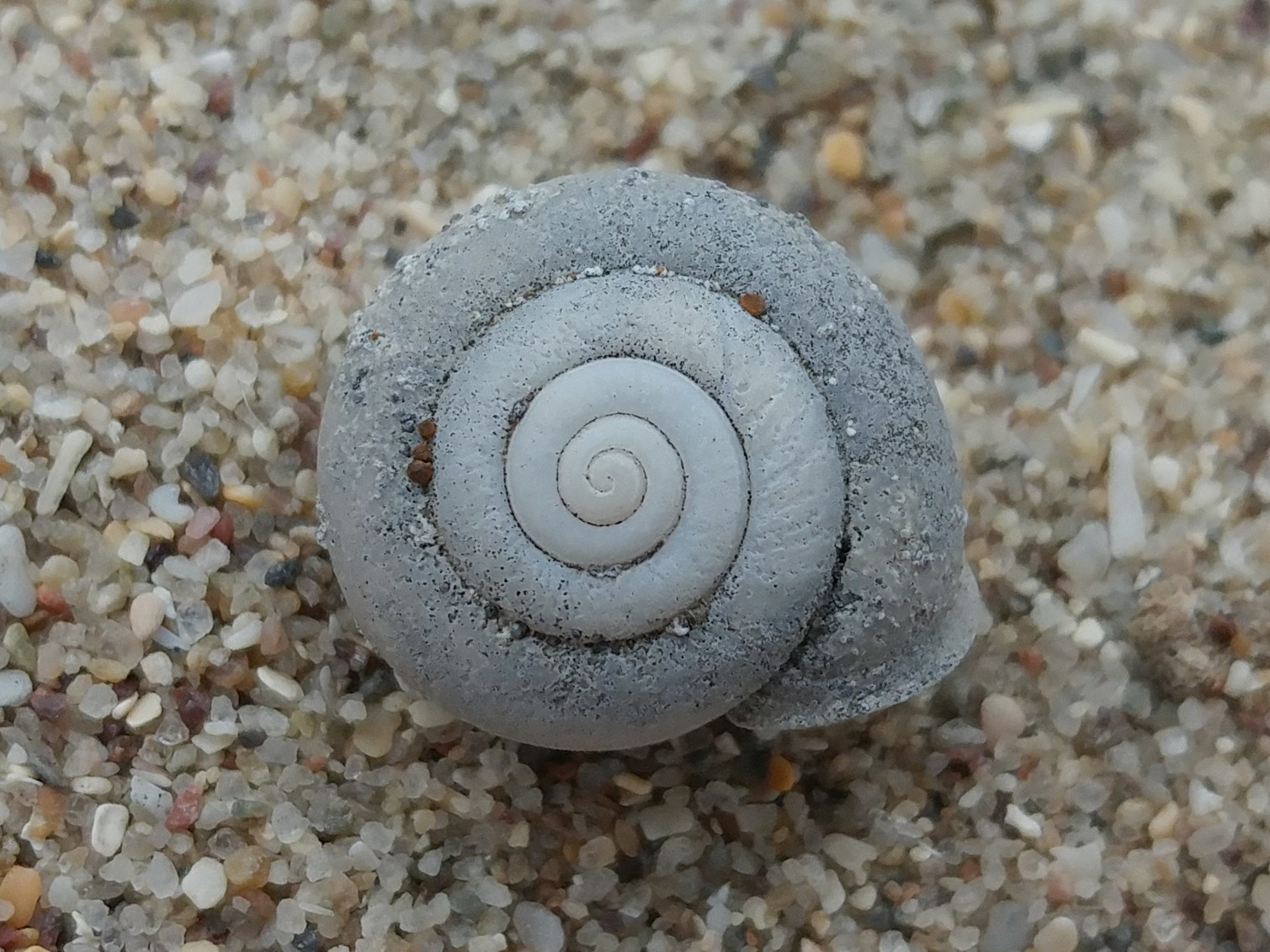
- Micrarionta feralis in California, United States

Conservation status
- Critically Endangered (IUCN 2.3)

- Critically Imperiled (NatureServe)

Scientific classification
- Kingdom: Animalia
- Phylum: Mollusca
- Class: Gastropoda
- Order: Stylommatophora
- Family: Xanthonychidae
- Genus: Micrarionta
- Species: M. feralis

Binomial name
- Micrarionta feralis (Hemphill, 1901)

Synonyms
- Helix rufocincta var. feralis Hemphill, 1901; Helix feralis Hemphill, 1901

= Micrarionta feralis =

Species of gastropod

Micrarionta feralis, the fraternal snail or San Nicolas Island snail, is a species of air-breathing land snail. It is a terrestrial pulmonate gastropod mollusk in the family Helminthoglyptidae. This species is endemic to the United States, specifically California.
