= Vermilacinia procera =

Species of lichen

Vermilacinia procera is a fruticose lichen of local occurrences on rocks near the sea along the Pacific Coast from San Francisco California to the Channel Islands, and to Punta Escarpada in Baja California (an isolated region along precipitous ocean cliffs between Punta Canoas and Punta San Carlos on the northern Peninsula of Baja California). The species is also reported to occur further south to the Vizcaíno Peninsula and on Cedros Island, but these reports are controversial in view of different interpretations of the species that include V. pumila and V. paleoderma that were not recognized at the time V. procera was described (as Niebla procera); for example, a specimen collected on Guadalupe Island by Weber and MCoy (L-3605, COLO that was cited by Phillip Rundel and Peter Bowler in 1994 as belonging to Niebla procera (=Vermilacinia procera), whereas in a revision of the genus by Richard Spjut in 1996, it was cited as belonging to Vermilacinia paleoderma. Both authorities generally agree to some extent on the description of the species and its geographical range within the California Floristic Province.

== Distinguishing features ==
Vermilacinia procera is a species in the subgenus Vermilacinia distinguished by the thallus divided into long slender cylindrical branches, irregularly blackened in patches from base to near apex, or only with black transverse band or spots. The cortex often develops transverse cracks with age; the cracked cortex is not the same as the cracked transverse cortical ridges that develop in species of Niebla such as commonly seen in N. homalea. Branches are from 2–6 cm (-8) cm in length and 1–2 mm in diameter. Lichen substances are primarily three terpenoid compounds, T3, zeorin and (-)-16 α-hydroxykaurane; bougeanic acid and salazinic acid occasionally present.

Vermilacinia paleoderma is distinguished from V. procera by the surface of the branches having crater-like depressions in contrast to a relatively even surface of V. procera and by producing abundant fertile blackened pycnidia in contrast to mostly sterile pycnidia in V. procera. The black banding and spot patterns in V. procera may be related to morphogenesis of the pycnidia as reported in subgenus Cylindricaria for sterile pycnidia in V. leopardina, in contrast to abundant fertile pycnidia in V. nylanderi. The brittle thallus of V. procera cracking transversely, appearing to fracture off sections of the thallus, would seem to constitute asexual reproduction by fragmentation.

Vermilacinia pumila is distinguished from V. procera by its relatively small thallus composed of stubby basal branches not more than 1 cm high.

== Taxonomic history ==
The genus Vermilacinia was distinguished from Niebla by the absence of longitudinal organization of hyphal cells within the medulla into chondroid strands, and by the secondary metabolites (lichen substances) primarily terpenes that include the triterpene zeorin, the diterpenes (-)-16 α-hydroxykaurane, an unidentified triterpene, referred to as T3, and the aliphatic depside, bourgeanic acid. None of these lichen substances are present in Niebla.

Peter Bowler with coauthor Janet Marsh in the Lichen Flora of the Greater Sonoran Desert stated that "there are no generic differences between it [Vermilacinia] and Niebla." In support of their conclusion they stated that "none of the earlier studies proposed separating groups at the generic level within Niebla," and that in a 1976 presentation he (Bowler) concluded that the hyphal aggregation embedded in the medulla of some of the larger rock and sand inhabiting forms of N. homalea and N. josecuervoi were not of generic significance, and noted that medullar hyphae in all species adhered to one degree or another." Reference to the 1976 presentation was not in the Literature Cited. Nevertheless, in their key to the species of Niebla—appeared the following statement: "Within the medulla individual chondroid strands evident in cross section of blades" that was applied to distinguish Niebla josecuervoi, N. homalea and N. isidiaescens" from other North American species treated by Spjut in Vermilacinia. In that same flora are Macaronesian species that were transferred by Bowler and Marsh from Ramalina to Niebla as new name combinations: Niebla bourgaeana, N. crispatula, and N. cupularis. These are species that are distinguished from Ramalina by the presence of chondroid strands in the medulla—isolated from the cortex;" thus, there is a contradiction in the rationale given by the authors for not distinguishing Vermilacinia.

Bowler and Marsh further stated that "chemistry is not a basis for separating Vermilacinia from Niebla, because it seems, as they say, there exists a "diversity of chemical races" without "apothecial, spore or pycnidial, or conidial differences." However, it was also stated under the genus Ramalina in the same flora that "species of Ramalina never produce (-)-16 α-hydroxykaurane that is often found in Niebla, but according to Spjut, that diterpene is found only in Vermilacinia, not in Niebla. Nevertheless, the mention of a chemical difference to distinguish the Ramalinaceae genera is another contradiction.

Richard Spjut, in a manuscript submitted for peer review in 1990, and also in a presentation to the American Bryological and Lichenological Society that same year, indicated that he had recognized 50 species in Niebla and Vermilacinia. This included Vermilacinia procera dating back to 1987 annotations on herbarium specimens at the United States National Herbarium, but under another name. This generic distinction was restated in 1994. Many specimens on loan from herbaria had to annotated a second time as result of the 1994 publication by Bowler and collaborators, specimens from Charis Bratt, now at the Santa Barbara Botanic Garden, had already been returned with the manuscript name that was not published.
