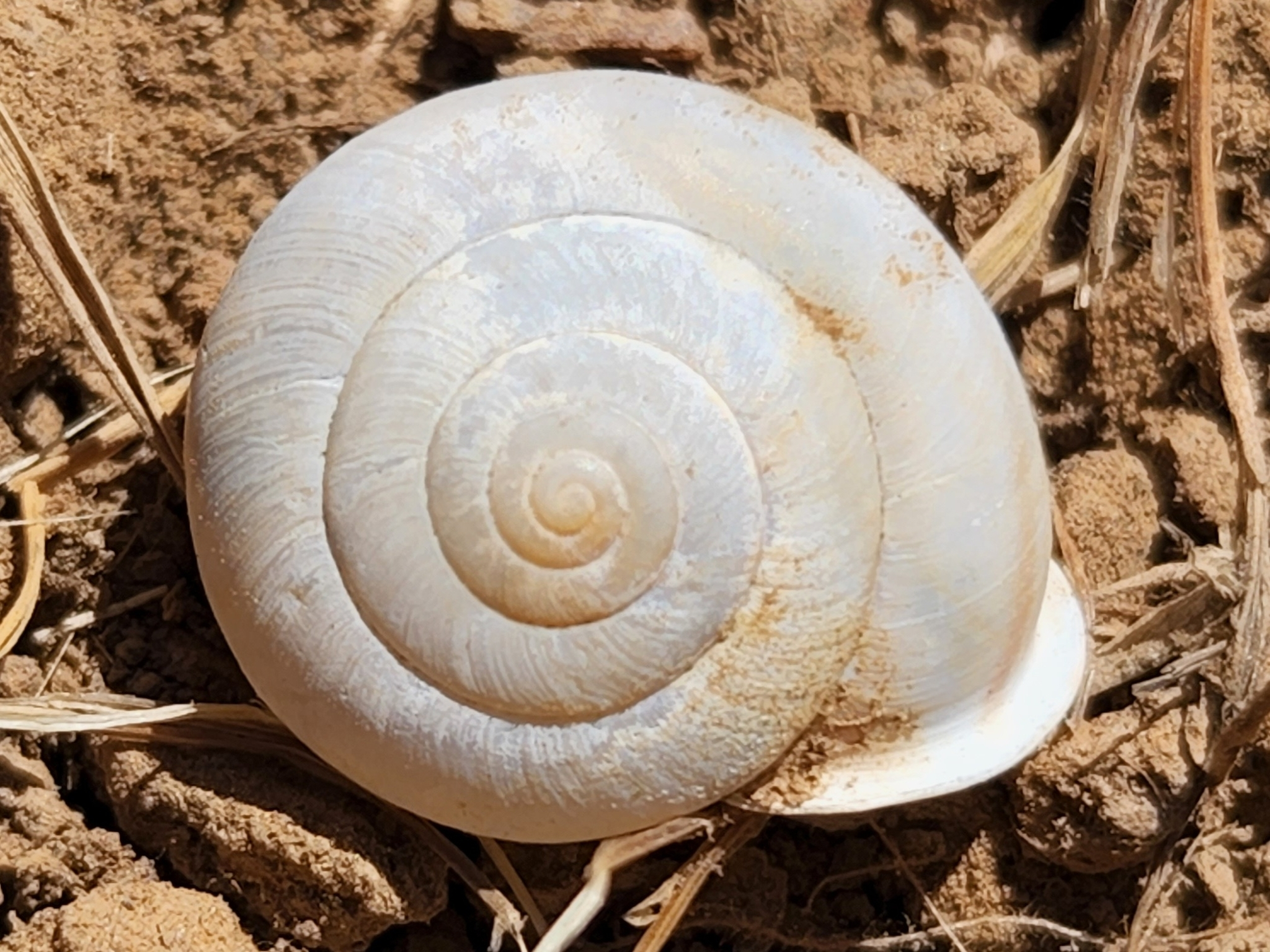
- Micrarionta rufocincta

Scientific classification
- Kingdom: Animalia
- Phylum: Mollusca
- Class: Gastropoda
- Order: Stylommatophora
- Family: Xanthonychidae
- Tribe: Helminthoglyptini
- Genus: Micrarionta; Ancey, 1880

Synonyms
- List: Epiphragmophora (Micrarionta) Ancey, 1880; Micrarionta (Micrarionta) Ancey, 1880; Micrarionta (Nicolenea) B. Roth, 1996

= Micrarionta =

Genus of gastropods

Micrarionta is a genus of medium-sized air-breathing land snails, terrestrial pulmonate gastropod mollusks in the family Helminthoglyptidae.

== Species ==
The following species are recognised in the genus Micrarionta:

- Micrarionta beatula Cockerell, 1929
- Micrarionta facta (Newcomb, 1864) - concentrated snail
- Micrarionta feralis (Hemphill, 1901) - fraternal snail
- Micrarionta gabbii (Newcomb, 1864) - Gabb's snail
- Micrarionta guadalupiana (Dall, 1898)
- Micrarionta intermedia Pilsbry, 1939
- Micrarionta micromphala Pilsbry, 1939
- Micrarionta opuntia B. Roth, 1975 - prickly pear island snail
- Micrarionta rufocincta (Newcomb, 1864)
- Micrarionta sodalis (Hemphill, 1901)
- Micrarionta veatchii (Newcomb, 1866)
