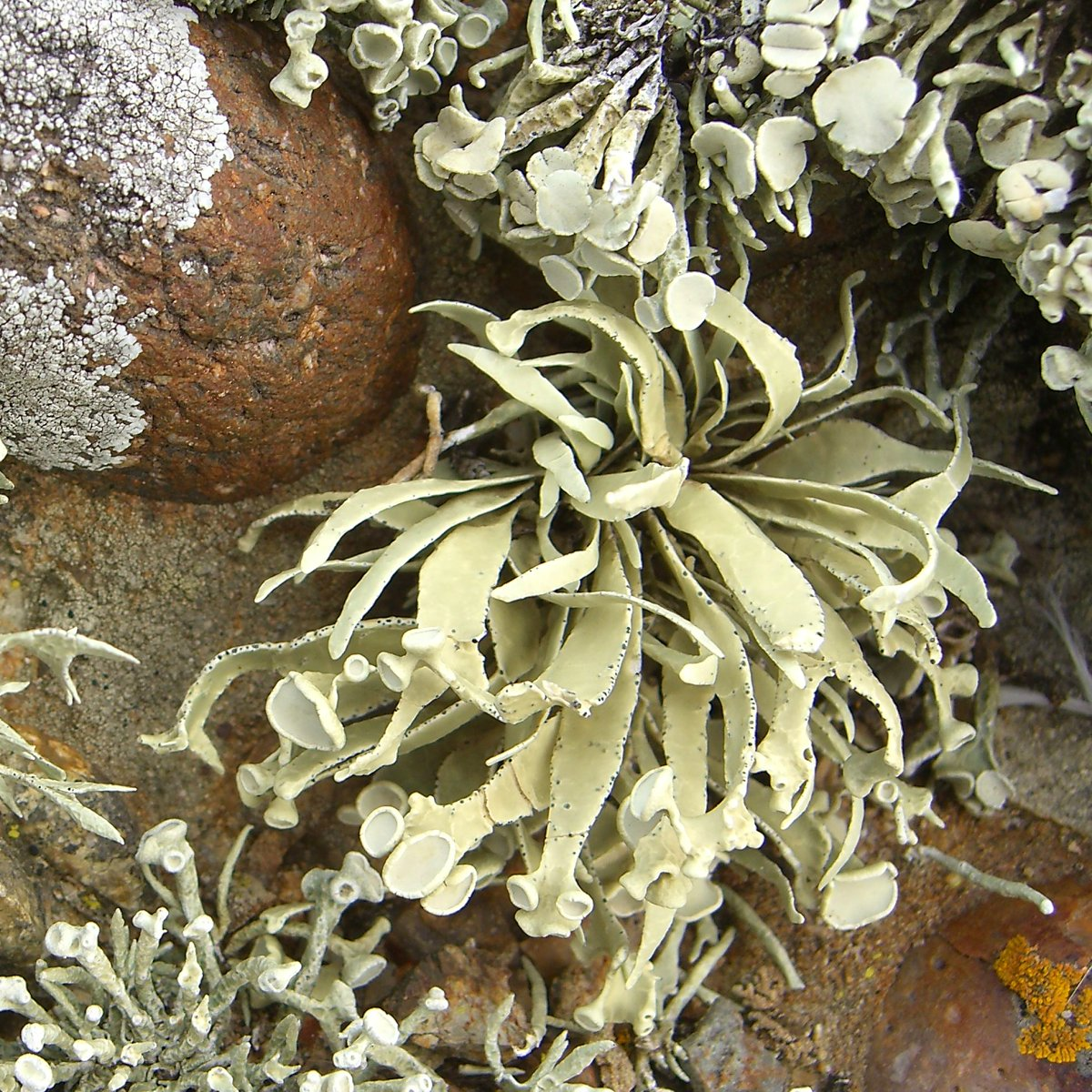

Scientific classification
- Domain: Eukaryota
- Kingdom: Fungi
- Division: Ascomycota
- Class: Lecanoromycetes
- Order: Lecanorales
- Family: Ramalinaceae
- Genus: Vermilacinia
- Species: V. laevigata

Binomial name
- Vermilacinia laevigata (Bowler & Rundel) Spjut (1996)

Synonyms
- Niebla laevigata Rundel & Bowler (1994)

= Vermilacinia laevigata =

Species of lichen

Vermilacinia laevigata is a fruticose lichen that occurs in the fog zone along the Pacific Coast of the California Floristic Province from Marin County, California to 15 miles south of Misión San Vicente Ferrer in Baja California.

== Distinguishing features ==
Vermilacinia laevigata is classified in the subgenus Vermilacinia. It is distinguished from related species by the thallus divided into mostly simple flattened strap-like branches and by having lichen substances predominantly of terpenes, an unknown terepene, T3, zeorin and (-)-16 α-hydroxykaurane, and by lacking the accessory substance of salazinic acid; also reported are bourgeanic acid and usnic acid. The thallus branches, which vary widely in shape from one thallus to another, usually spread upwards and outwards, and are often curved and slightly twisted. Apothecia develop terminally on branches, slightly elevated on short stalk-like narrower branches, and have a white disk. The cortex is 100–175 microns thick with a smooth outer surface, which is in regard to the epithet, laevigata, meaning smooth.

Thalli of Vermilacinia laevigata with narrow branches are likely to be confused with Niebla homalea, while those with wider branches resemble Niebla cornea or Niebla eburnea. These species, which often occur together, are best distinguished by the presence or absence of chondroid strands, and by their secondary metabolites. Herbarium specimens of V. laevigata, which usually develop a whitish mold-like appearance when stored in the herbarium for a long time, had been known for years as Niebla homalea The distinction of the species was clarified from further study of their chemistry and morphology; Vermilacinia does not develop chondroid strands within the medulla, while Niebla does not have (-)-16 α-hydroxykaurane.

== Taxonomic history ==
For a short time, during 1987–1994, Vermilacinia laevigata was proposed by another name, indicated in a manuscript distributed to lichenologists in California, Maryland, and Germany, and in annotation labels of numerous specimens by Richard Spjut. He had chosen a name for the species in honor of Mason E. Hale, Jr. His first encounter with the species was near Cerro Solo in northern Baja California (Spjut 9047C, 1 May 1985, US), while collecting a sample of Niebla eburnea as part of systematic collection of lichens for screening by the National Cancer Institute in search of new drugs to treat HIV. The annotation labels for the specimens had to be redone as a result of Peter Bowler and Phillip Rundel publishing their name first, except for specimens from Charis Bratt— now at the Santa Barbara Botanic Garden—that were returned to her with the unpublished name.

When Vermilacinia was described as a new genus in 1995, it became necessary to transfer Niebla laevigata, described by Bowler and Rundel in 1994, to the genus Vermilacinia. In 2004, Peter Bowler and Janet Marsh transferred it back to Niebla R. Heber Hower, Jr. in his revision of North American Ramalina, Section Ellipsosporae, stated that: “There are but two really distinctive characters—one made use of by Tuckerman, the chondroid axial filaments (almost of generic importance) of ceruchis and homalea—the other that of spore form.” But Howe did not apply the chondroid character in his key, or mention it in his descriptions, nor did he recognize what is now Vermilacinia laevigata; instead, he separated the two by whether the branches (“laciniae”) were terete (= Vermilacinia) or compressed-angulate (= Niebla). Bowler in 1981 recognized three groups based on cortical features, which correspond to Niebla and the two Vermilacinia subgenera, subgenus Vermilacinia and subgenus Cylindricaria. Spjut was the first to apply both cortical and chemical characters that clearly led to recognition of two genera as was suggested by Howe and also by Hildur Krog and Haavard Østhagen in 1980 who stated: “We consider that the anatomical traits characteristic of Steiner's Corticatae, perhaps linked with chemical traits as suggested by Follmann (1976a) show greater promise as a basis for a taxonomic subdivision.”
