= Santa Barbara Island =

Island of the Channel Islands in California, United States

Coordinates: 33°28′37.16″N 119°02′15.80″W

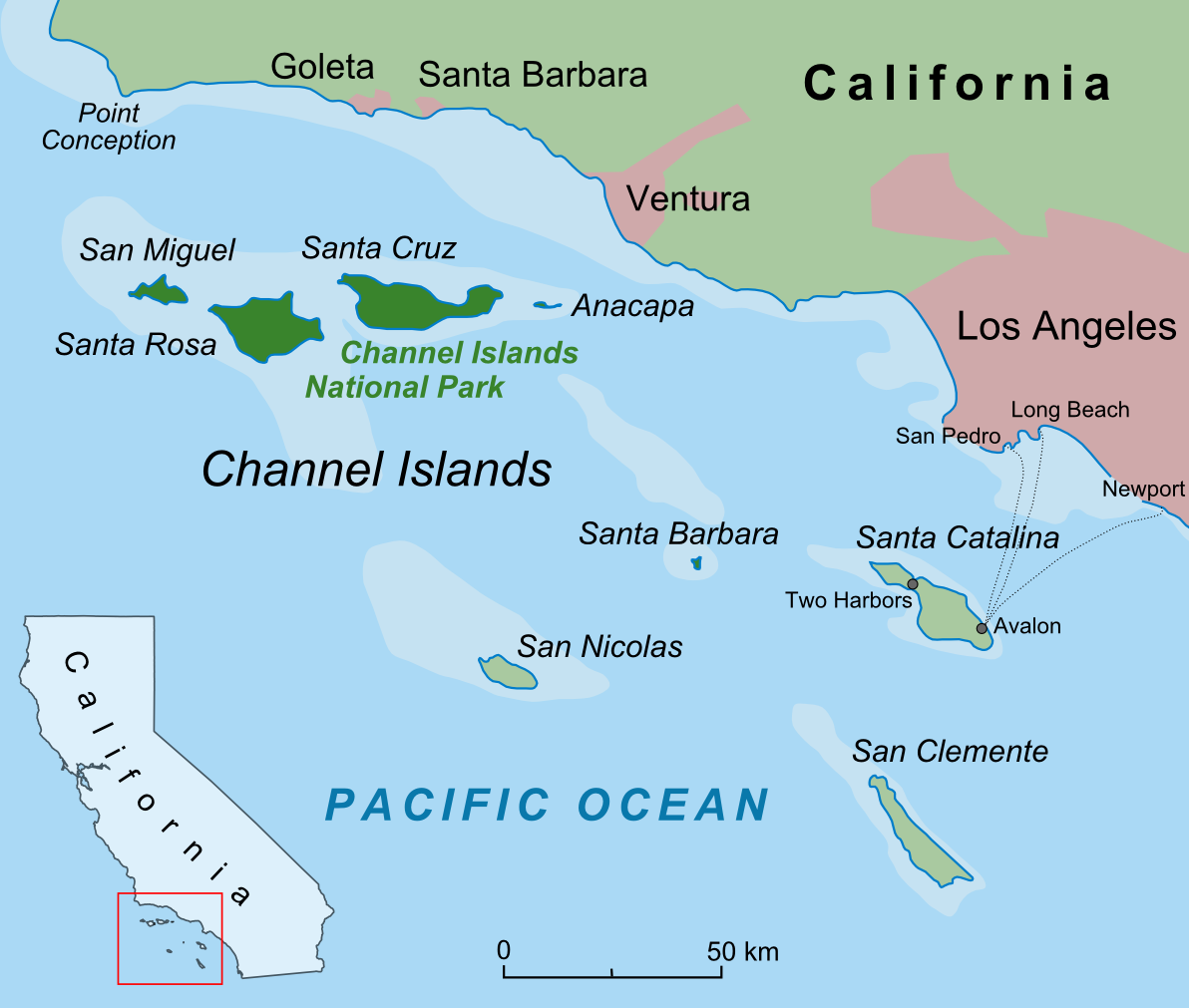
Map of the Channel Islands of California, indicating Santa Barbara Island.

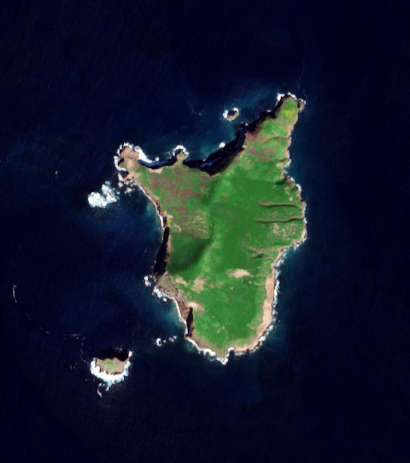
Satellite photo

Santa Barbara Island (Spanish: Isla de Santa Bárbara; Tongva: Tchunashngna) is a small island of the Channel Islands archipelago in Southern California. It is protected within Channel Islands National Park, and its marine ecosystem is part of the Channel Islands National Marine Sanctuary. Public passenger access to Santa Barbara Island is provided by the Island Packers ferry service.

== Geography ==
The island is located about 38 miles (61 km) from the Palos Verdes Peninsula coast of Los Angeles County, Southern California, (near Ventura County and west of Greater Los Angeles).

With a total area of about 1 square mile (640 acres or 260 hectares), it is the smallest of the eight Channel Islands. It is the southernmost island in the Channel Islands National Park. The highest peak on the island is Signal Hill, at 634 ft (193 m).

Although closer to mainland Ventura County and Los Angeles County, the island is part of Santa Barbara County (United States Census Bureau Block 3012, Block Group 3, Census Tract 29.10). It is the only one of the four southern Channel Islands included in the Channel Islands National Park, which also encompasses all four northern islands. As of the 2000 census the island is uninhabited and has a total land area of 1.0136 sq mi (2.625 km^{2}).

The island is so small that it cannot usually be seen from the mainland, except on clear days (usually in winter). At sunset the island is a backlit silhouette.

== Geology ==
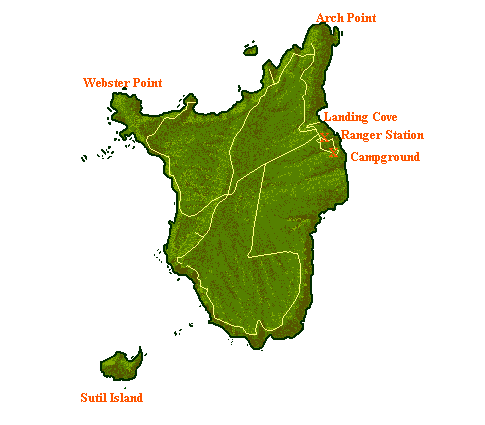
Map of Santa Barbara Island

While the island is not a volcano, it is composed primarily of Miocene volcanic rocks (basalt) interbedded with marine sediments.

The steep wave-cut cliffs of its shoreline indicate that this is one of the younger Channel Islands. It exhibits at least six marine terraces; evidence of repeated tectonic uplift and subsidence (so called porpoising). Arch Point, on the north-east shore of the island is a 130 ft (40 m) arch caused by wave erosion of fault weakened rock.

Offshore, there are two named rocks: Sutil Island off the southwest end (12 acres (49,000 m^{2})) and Shag Rock off the northerly shore (1-acre (4,000 m^{2})) .

== History ==
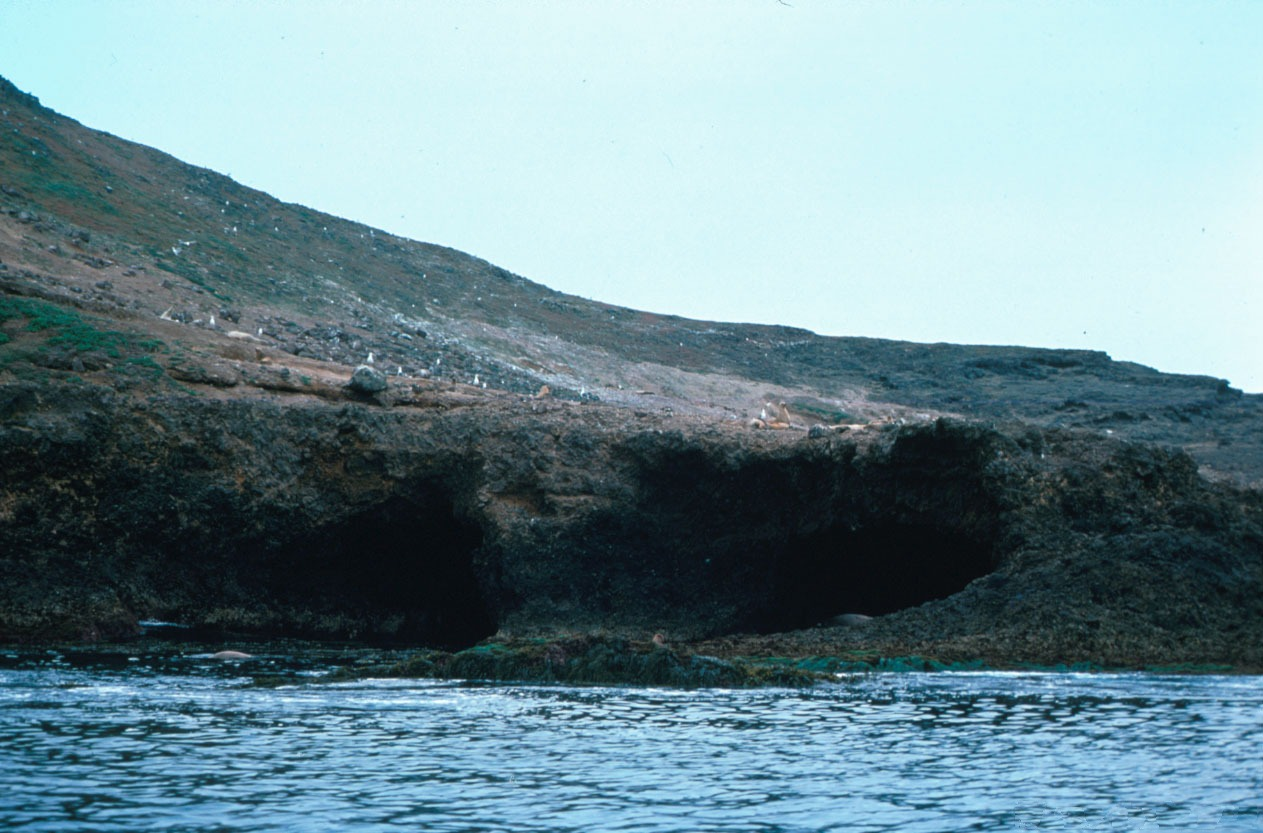
Santa Barbara Island from offshore

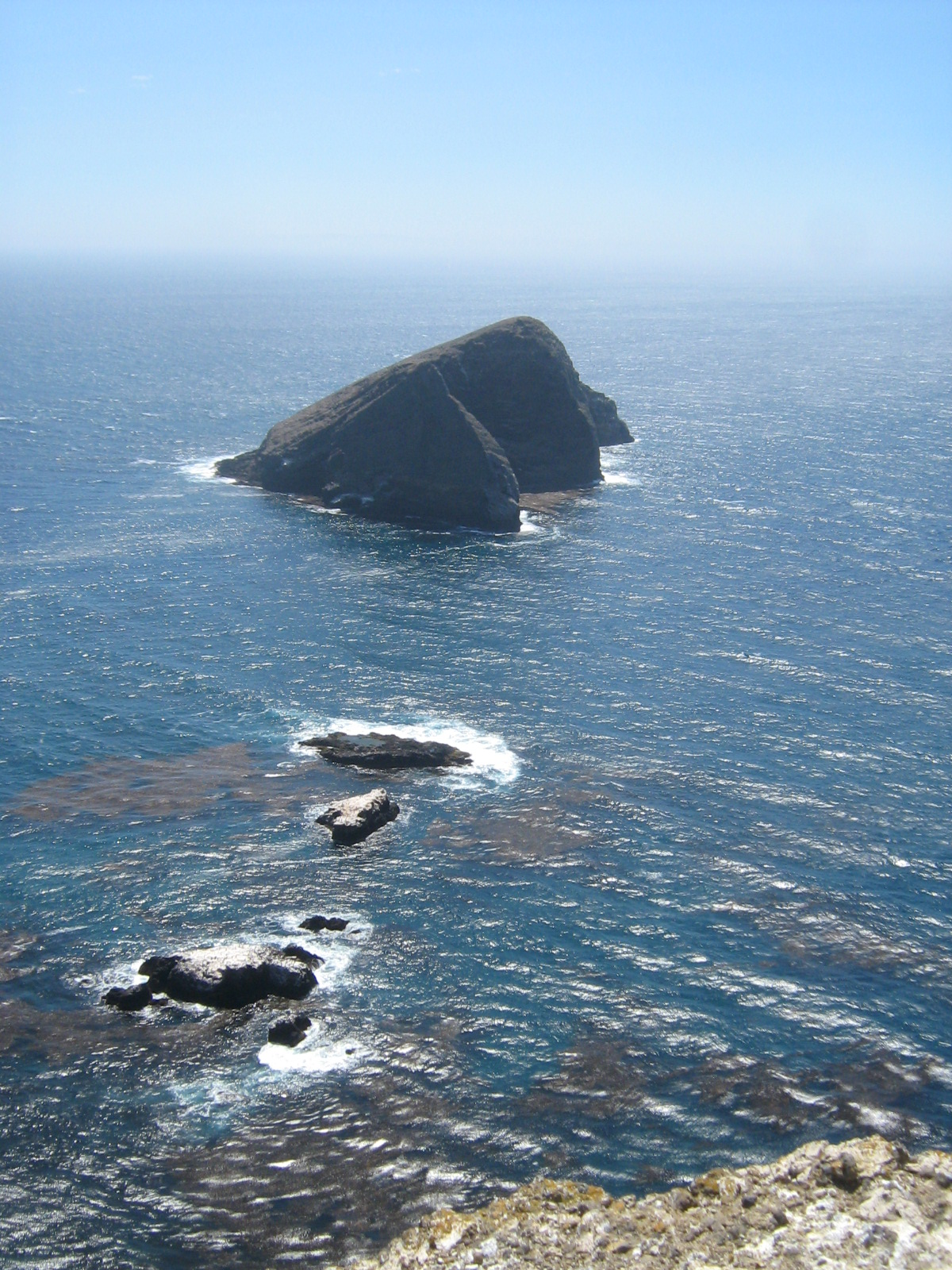
Sutil Island, southwest of Santa Barbara Island

Native American peoples, probably the Chumash and Tongva, occupied Santa Barbara Island periodically for millennia. Archaeological sites dating to as much as 4,000 years ago have been documented on the island, which may have served as a stopover or refuge point for voyagers between the mainland and the other Channel Islands.

The island was named by Spanish explorer Sebastián Vizcaíno, who sighted the island on 4 December 1602, the feast day dedicated to Saint Barbara. The United States Coast Survey surveyed the island in the 1850s. Squatting fishermen and seal hunters occupied the island, including H. Bay Webster near Webster Point, until the federal government leased the island to J.G. Howland in July 1909 for a period of five years. Alvin Hyder assumed the next five-year lease. From 1916 onwards, the island was occupied by the Hyder brothers, Alvin, Clarence and Cleve, with their families. They raised sheep until departing the island in 1922. The only other individuals to lease the island, before it became part of the national monument in 1938, were by Arthur McLelland and Harry Cupit from 1929 to 1932.

In 1852, Charles Melville Scammon, in the brig Mary Helen, hunted northern elephant seals and sea lions on Santa Barbara Island. In December 1934, the steam-schooner California spent a week anchored off the island, processing blue, fin, and sperm whales caught by her two steam-driven whale catchers Hawk and Port Saunders.

The United States Lighthouse Board erected a beacon on the northwest side of the island in 1928, followed by the addition of a second beacon on the southwest corner in 1934. The United States Coast Guard took over servicing, and replaced the northwest tower with a steel tower, solar-powered, in 1980. From 1942 until 1946, the United States Navy built a Coastal Lookout Station on the island, and in the 1960s they built a photo-tracking station, but had left the island by the mid-1960s.

== Natural history ==
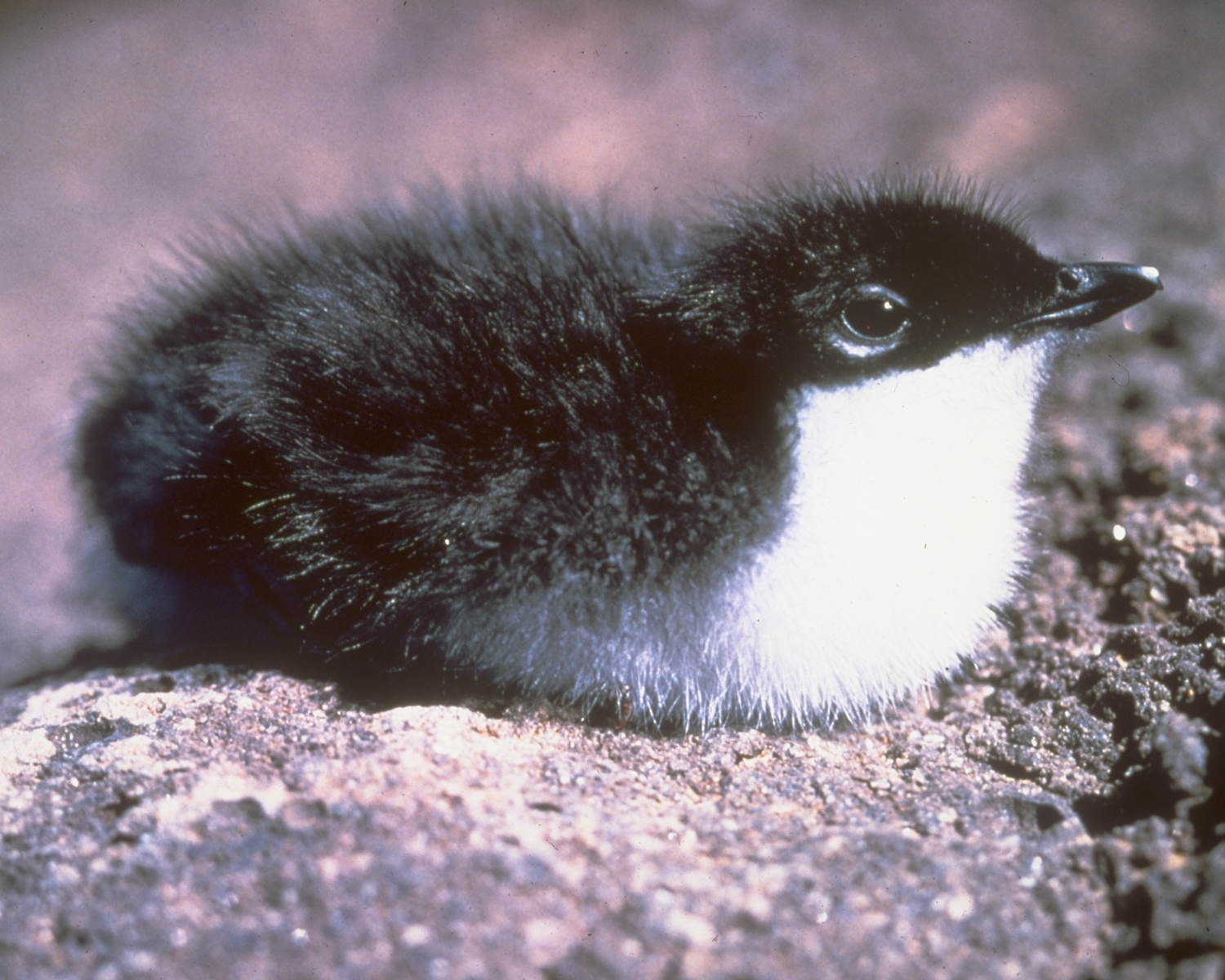
Scripps's murrelet chick, Santa Barbara Island

=== Fauna ===
Santa Barbara Island is home to a large sea lion rookery and seabird nesting colonies. It is also home to the largest breeding colony for Scripps's murrelet, a threatened seabird species. Scripps's murrelet is listed as vulnerable because so much of its breeding takes place on such a small and isolated island.

Fourteen species of birds nest annually on the island. These include the horned lark, orange-crowned warbler, and house finch. Other birds found on the island include the brown pelican, Western gull, storm petrels, Scripps's murrelet, Guadalupe murrelet, and cormorants. Sea lions, harbor seals, and northern elephant seals are found along the shoreline.

=== Flora ===
Santa Barbara Island live-forever (Dudleya traskiae) is a succulent plant endemic to the island. A variety of St. Catherine's lace buckwheat (Eriogonum giganteum), Eriogonum giganteum var. compactum or Santa Barbara Island buckwheat, is endemic to and particularly rare on Santa Barbara Island.

== In popular culture ==
- California's Gold Episode 508

== See also ==
- Flora of the Channel Islands of California
- List of islands of California
