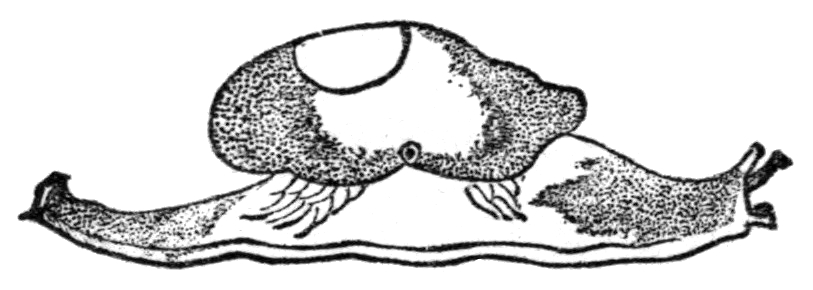
- Hemphillia glandulosa

Scientific classification
- Kingdom: Animalia
- Phylum: Mollusca
- Class: Gastropoda
- Order: Stylommatophora
- Superfamily: Arionoidea
- Family: Binneyidae; Cockerell, 1891

Genera
- See text

= Binneyidae =

Family of gastropods

Binneyidae is a family of air-breathing land slugs, terrestrial pulmonate gastropod mollusks in the superfamily Arionoidea (according to the taxonomy of the Gastropoda by Bouchet & Rocroi, 2005).

== Genera ==
The family Binneyidae has no subfamilies.

Genera within the family Binneyidae include:

- Binneya Cooper, 1863 - the type genus
- Hemphillia Bland & Binney, 1872
- ?Gliabates Webb, 1959
