= Glossary of lichen terms =

This glossary provides an overview of terms used in the description of lichens, composite organisms arising from algae or cyanobacteria living symbiotically among filaments of multiple fungus species.

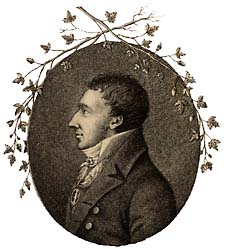
Erik Acharius

Erik Acharius, known as the "father of lichenology," coined many lichen terms still in use today around the turn of the 18th century. Before that, only a couple of lichen-specific terms had been proposed. Johann Dillenius introduced scyphus in 1742 to describe the cup-shaped structures associated with genus Cladonia, while in 1794 Michel Adanson used lirella for the furrowed fruitbodies of the genus Graphis. Acharius introduced numerous terms to describe lichen structures, including apothecium, cephalodium, cyphellae, podetium, proper margin, soredium, and thallus. In 1825, Friedrich Wallroth published the first of his multi-volume work Naturgeschichte der Flechten ("Natural History of Lichens"), in which he proposed an alternative terminology based largely on roots from the Greek language. His work, presented as an alternative to that of Acharius (of whom he was critical) was not well received, and the only terms he proposed to gain widespread acceptance were epi- and hypophloeodal, hetero- and homoiomerous, and gonidium, the last of which remained in use until the 1960s. Until about 1850, there were 21 terms for features of the lichen thallus that remain in use today.

The increasing availability of the optical microscope as an aid to identifying and characterizing lichens led to the creation of new terms to describe structures that were previously too small to be visualized. Contributions were made by Julius von Flotow (e.g. epithecium), Edmond Tulasne (e.g pycnidium), and William Nylander (e.g. pseudocyphella, thecium). Gustav Wilhelm Körber, an early proponent of using spore structure as a character in lichen taxonomy, introduced amphithecium, muriform, and "polari-dyblastae", later anglicized to "polari-bilocular" and then shortened to polarilocular. In the next five decades that followed, many other additions were made to the repertoire of lichen terms, subsequent to the increased understanding of lichen anatomy and physiology made possible by microscopy. For whatever reasons, there were not any new terms (still currently used) introduced from the period 1906 to 1945, when Gustaf Einar Du Rietz proposed replacing epi- and hypothecium with epi- and subhymenium; all four terms remain in use. In some cases, older terminology became obsolete as better understanding of the nature of the fungal–algal relationship led to changes in their terminology. For example, after Gunnar Degelius objected to the use of gonidia for the algal partner, George Scott proposed the use of mycobiont and phycobiont for lichen components, recommendations that were generally accepted by lichenologists.

This glossary includes terms defining features of lichens unique to their composite nature, such as the major components the two major components of lichens (mycobiont and photobiont); specialized structures in lichen physiology; descriptors of types of lichens; two- and three-dimensional shapes used to describe spores and other lichen structures; terms of position and shape; prefixes and suffixes commonly used to form lichen terms; terminology used in methods for the chemical identification of lichens; the names of 22 standard insoluble lichen pigments and their associated reference species; and "everyday" words that have a specialized meaning in lichenology. The list also includes a few historical terms that have been supplanted or are now considered obsolete. Familiarity with these terms is helpful for understanding older literature in the field.

== A ==
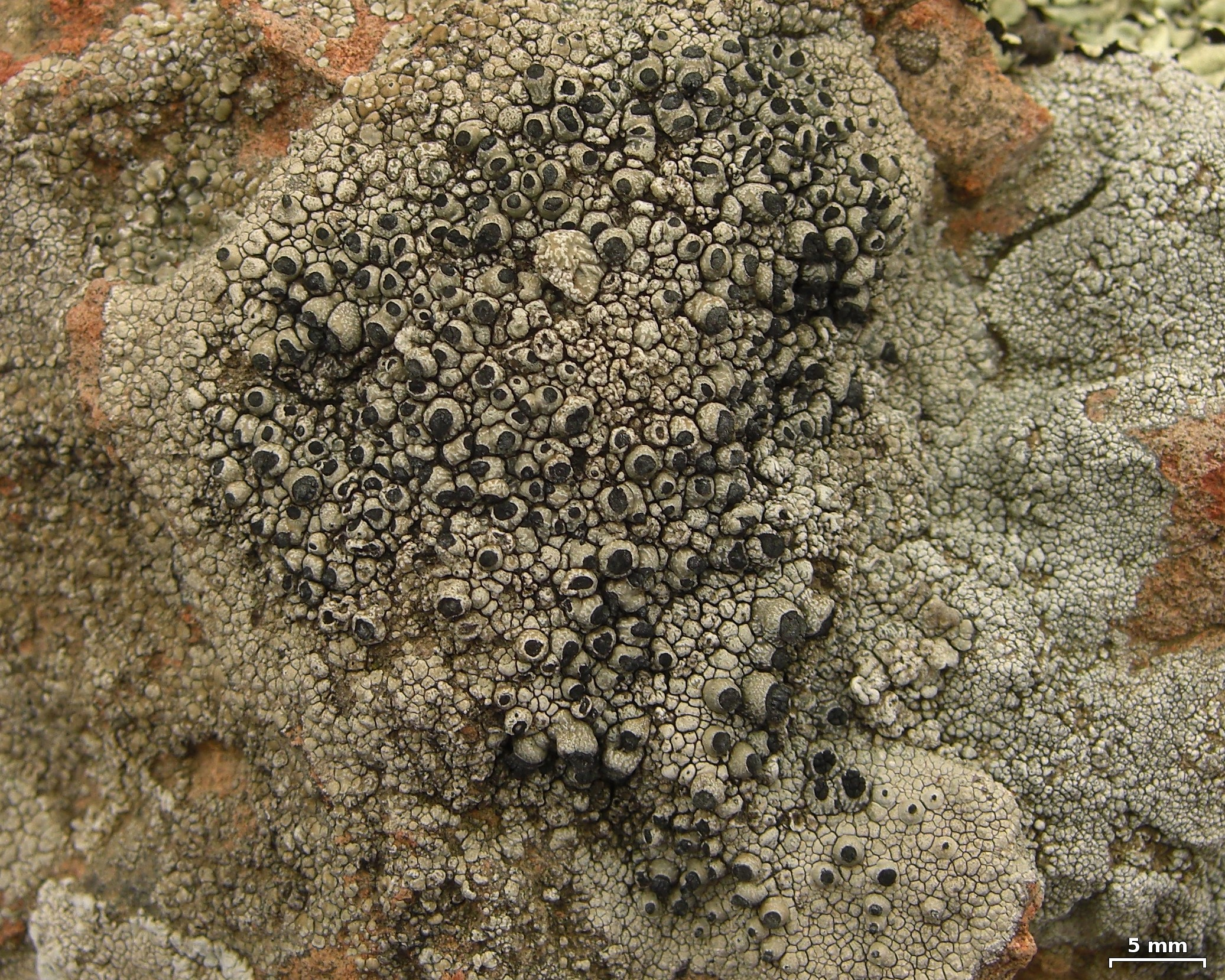
Thelomma santessonii is a crustose, areolate lichen.

a-
Also an-. A prefix meaning "not having" or "without".
ab-
A prefix meaning "positioned away from".
abortive
Referring to a developmental process in lichens where certain structures, such as spores or reproductive organs, fail to reach full development or maturity, often resulting in non-viable or malformed structures.
abraded
Having a worn or eroded thallus surface.
accessory substance
A lichen product that is sometimes present, sometimes not present in a species. In literature, these are usually indicated with a ± symbol, e.g. ±usnic acid.
-aceae
A suffix used to indicate the taxonomic rank of family.
-aceous
A suffix used to indicate a relation or similarity to something.
acervulate
Shaped like a saucer.

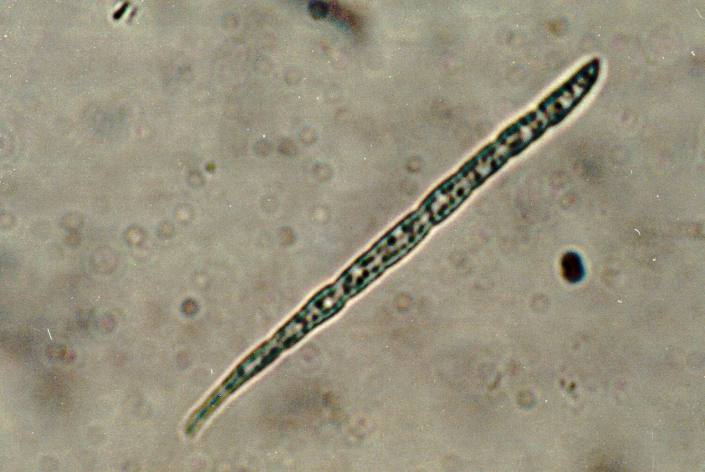
An acicular spore of Bacidia schweinitzii

acicular
Also aciculiform. Needle-shaped; long and slender with a taper at both ends. Typically used to describe spore shape.
acro-
Also acr-. A prefix used to indicate that something is positioned on the end or the upper part.
acrogenous
Developing on the apex of a structure.
acroton
A needle-shaped structure with lateral branches.
actinolichen
A lichen-like association between an actinobacterium (Streptomyces) and a green alga (Chlorella xantha).
acuminate
Gradually tapering to a point.
ad-
A prefix used to indicate positioning at the end or on an extremity.
adglutinated
Stuck together.
adnate
Having a tight attachment to a surface.
adventive branching
Referring to fruticose lichens, a branching pattern that is unusual or abnormal, like that which sometimes occurs after the original branches are damaged in Cladonia.
-al
A suffix used to indicate a relation to, or having the form and character of something.
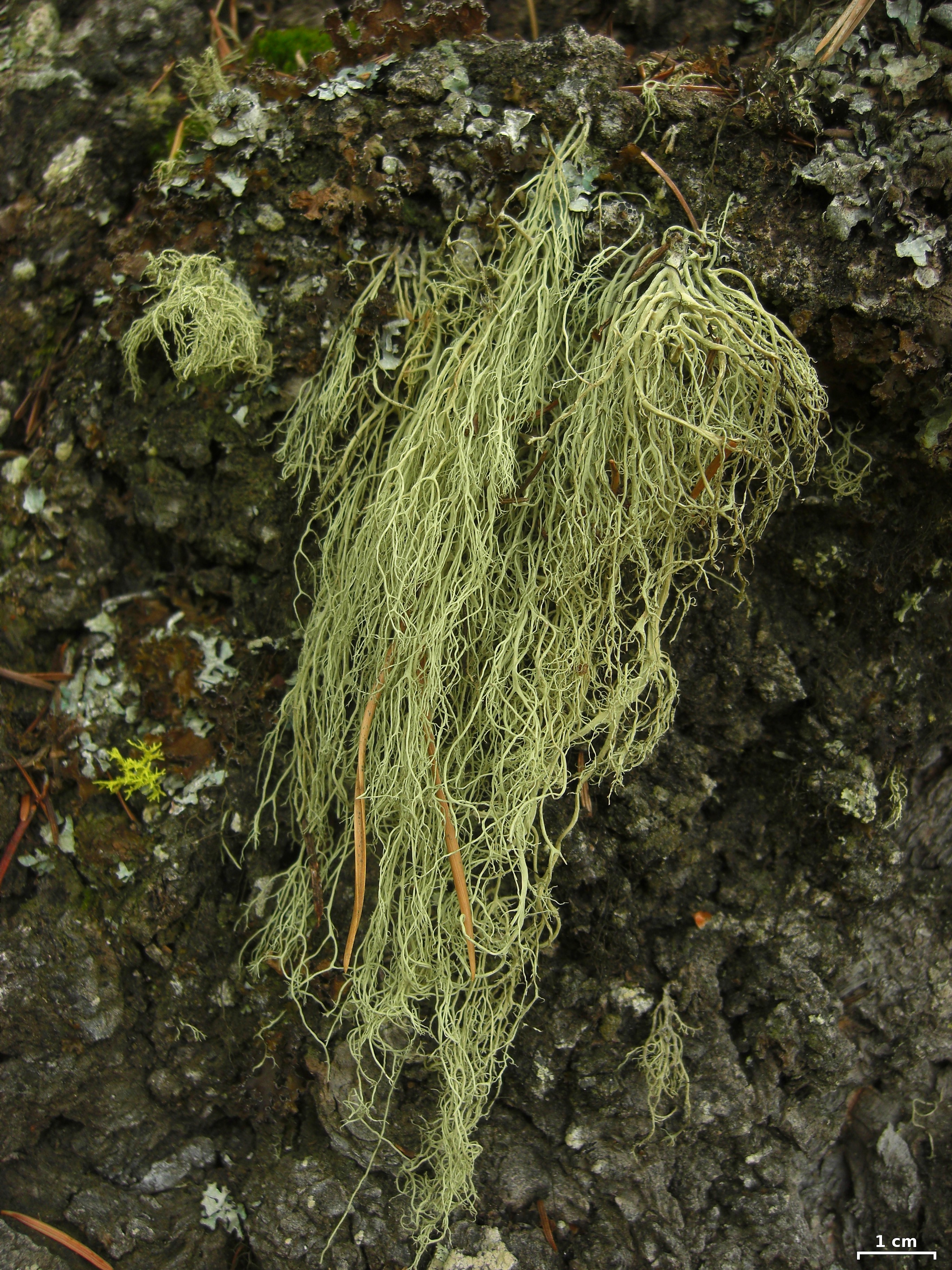
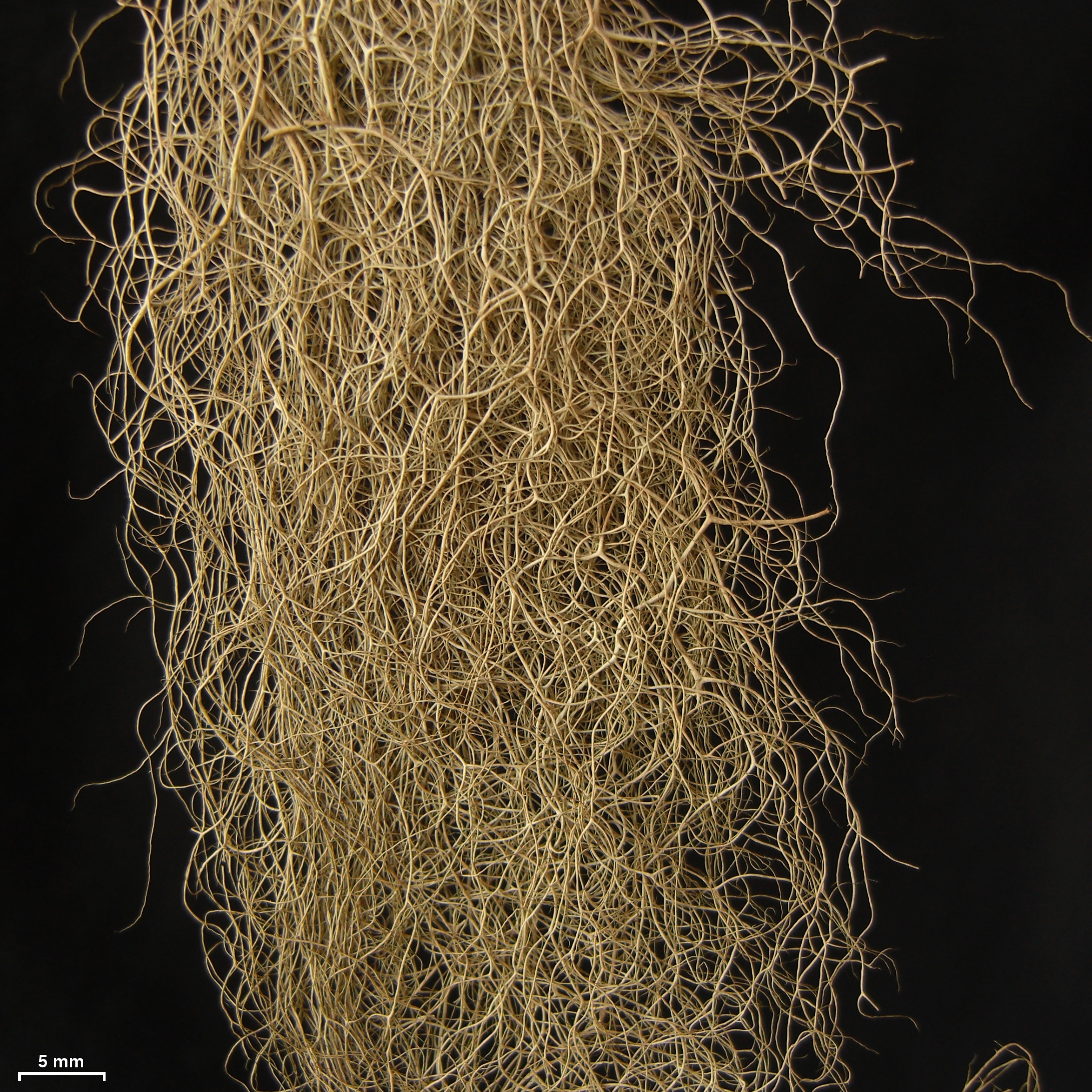
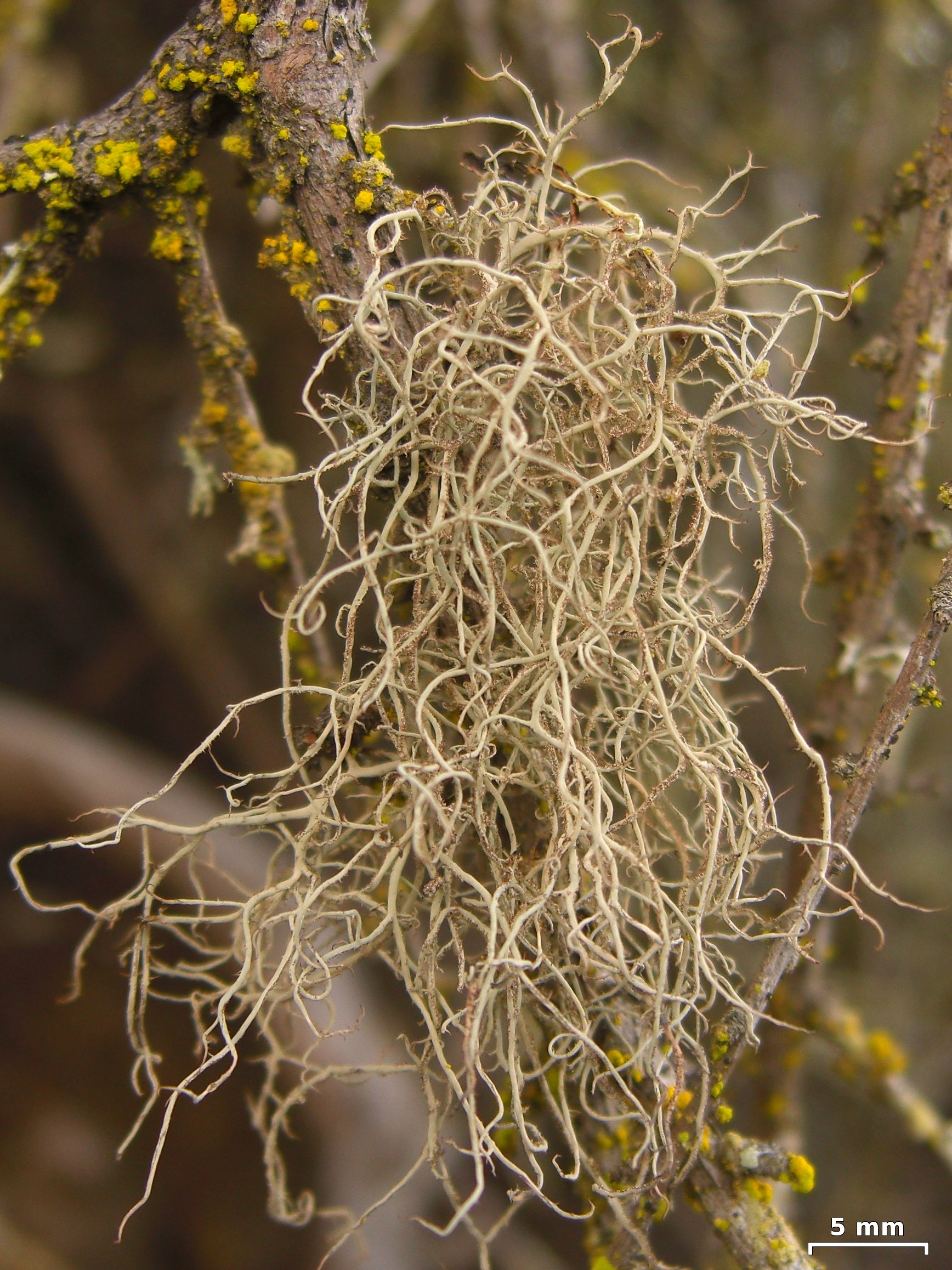
Alectoria sarmentosa, Bryoria capillaris, and Sulcaria isidiifera are examples of alectorioid lichens.
alectorioid lichen
An informal growth form category used for lichens that are fruticose, typically with beard-like thalli that are pendant or clustered; this group of features is characteristic of lichens now classified in the genera Alectoria, Bryoria, Oropogon, Pseudephebe, and Sulcaria.
algal layer
Also photobiont layer. The layer of tissue in a heteromerous lichen thallus that contains the photobiont; it is typically located between the upper cortex and the medulla.
alcobiosis
Plural alcobioses. A form of symbiosis involving algae and corticioid fungi, primarily occurring on bark and wood surfaces. In this relationship, algae form a layer beneath the fungal basidiomata—structures akin to the photobiont layer in lichens. This association, unlike in lichens, does not render the fungal partner nutritionally dependent on the algae, thus all involved fungal species are capable of surviving without the algal partner. Alcobiosis represents a diverse interaction, seen in various stages of coevolution, involving multiple species across the Agaricomycetes fungal group and three algal species from the class Trebouxiophyceae.
alveolate
Used to describe a surface that has a pattern similar to a honeycomb (i.e. with more or less 6-sided hollows), where the surface appears to be composed of small pits or cavities like alveoli. Compare: faveolate, foveolate, scrobiculate.
amphi-
A prefix used to indicate on both sides, or on all sides.
amphithecium
Plural amphithecia. The thalline margin of a lecanorine apothecium; equivalent to the thalline exciple. The amphithecium usually contains algal cells. The term was coined by Wilhelm Körber in 1855, but languished in obscurity until 1898, when Otto Darbishire used it in a monograph of the genus Roccella.
ampliotremoid
A morphotype of corticolous thelotremoid lichens used to describe characteristics of apothecial and thallus morphology. Ampliotremoid lichens have prominent apothecia with wide pores, black walls (viewed in microscopic section), and a smooth, more or less shiny thallus; this morphotype occurs in the genera Ampliotrema and Ocellularia.
ampulliform
Bottle-shaped, i.e., with a narrow neck and swollen base.
amyloid
Turn a purple or blue color upon reaction with Melzer's reagent.

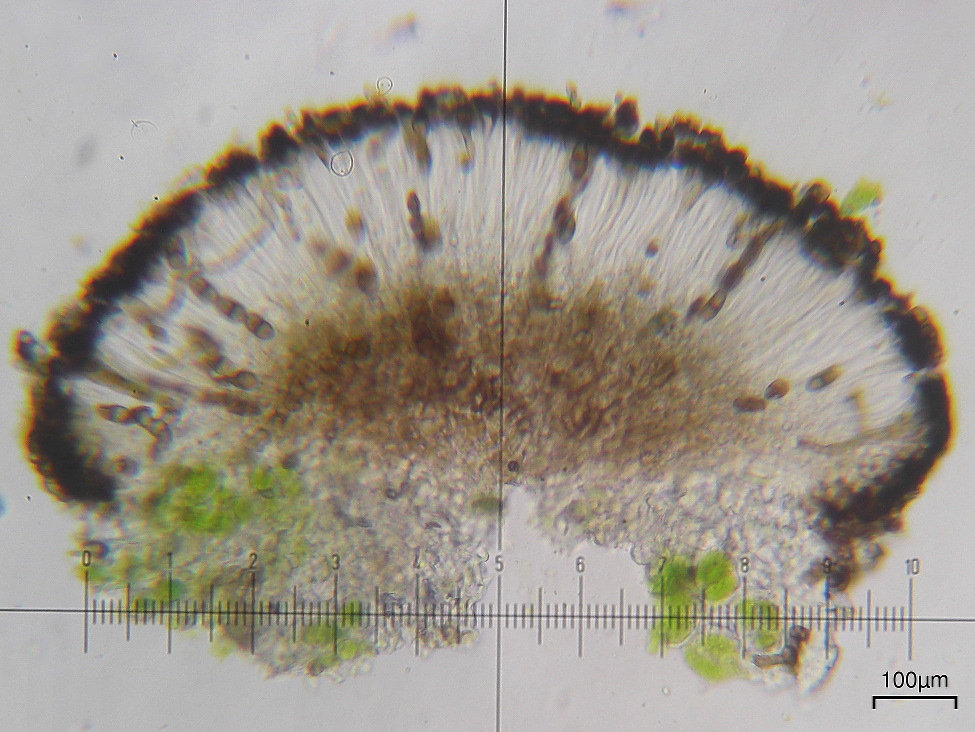
Cross section of an apothecium of the lichen Amandinea punctata. The exciple is pigmented dark brown, the epihymenium is brown, and the algal cells are green; asci (containing ascospores) are visible in the hyaline hymenium.

anisotomic
Also anisotomous. Having branches of unequal length; if the branching is anisotomic, one branch is typically stouter than the other, forming a main stem while the other appears like a lateral branch, as in the species Alectoria ochroleuca. Contrast: dichotomous.
annulotremoid
A morphotype of corticolous thelotremoid lichens used to describe characteristics of apothecial and thallus morphology. Annulotremoid lichens have prominent apothecia with wide pores, pores with an inner ring, and a smooth, more or less shiny thallus; this morphotype occurs in the genera Myriotrema and Thelotrema.
anticlinal
Perpendicular to a surface; used to refer to hyphal alignment.
apical
Located at the highest point (the apex), the tip, or the end of something.
apiculate
Having a short projection (an apicule) at one end; typically used to describe spore morphology.
apothecium
Plural apothecia. A type of ascocarp that is open, saucer-shaped or cup-shaped, and in which the hymenium is exposed at maturity. The term was first used by Erik Acharius in 1803.
appressed
Lying flat; flattened down on a surface.
arachnoid
Also arachnoidal, araneose, araneous. Having a cobweb-like form, like that of the irregularly oriented and loosely interwoven hyphae of the medullary layer of some lichens.
Arceutina-yellow
A pale yellow insoluble lichen pigment, associated with the reference species Bacidia arceutina.
arcuate
A shape or structure that is curved or arched like a bow.
ardella
Plural ardellae. A type of apothecium, typical of lichens in the family Arthoniaceae, which is small and round. Elongated ardellae are called lirellae. The term was first used by William Allport Leighton in 1854, who described an ardella as resembling a "sprinkled spot".

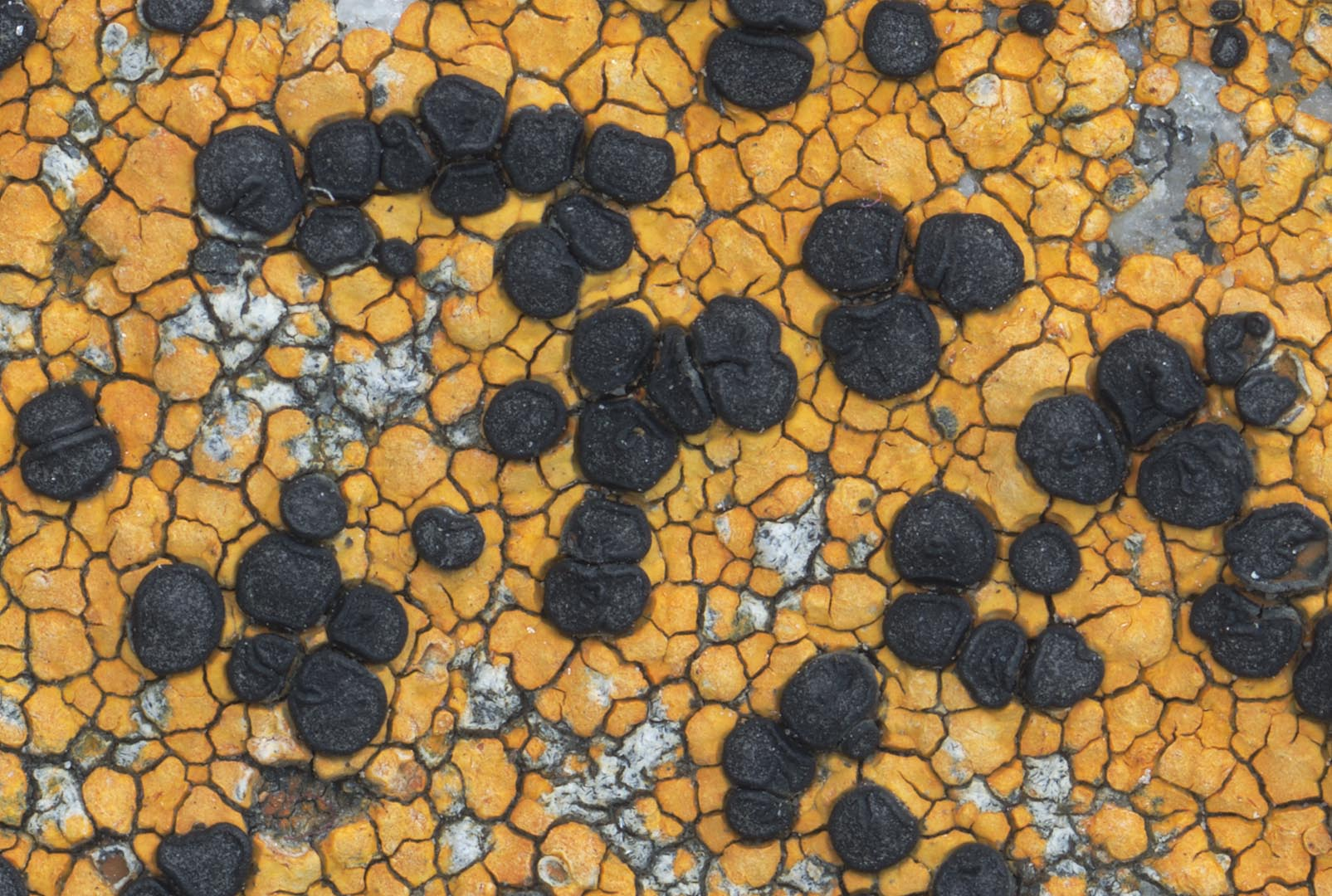
Closeup of some areolae and lecideine apothecia of Porpidia flavocaerulescens

areole
Plural areoles. Also areola with plural areolae. A small area, typically rounded to polygonal or irregular in shape, and often with a distinct texture. In a lichen thallus, the areolae are often separated from the rest of the thallus by fissures or cracks.
areolate
Also areolar. The condition of being made of or covered with areolae, such as the areolate lichens.
Arnoldiana-brown
A reddish-brown insoluble lichen pigment, associated with the reference species Bacidina arnoldiana.
ascigerous
Having asci.
asco-
A prefix meaning "ascus".
ascocarp
Also ascoma, plural ascomata. The fruiting body of an ascomycete fungus, containing the asci and ascospores.
ascoconidium
Plural ascoconidia. A conidium that is formed directly from an ascospore.
ascogenous
Also ascogenic. Producing or supporting the growth of an ascus.
ascogonium
Plural ascogonia. The cell or group of cells within an ascocarp from which the asci (spore-producing cells) ultimately develop.
ascolichen
A lichen in which the fungal partner (the mycobiont) is a member of the Ascomycota. About 98% of lichens are ascolichens. See related: basidiolichen.

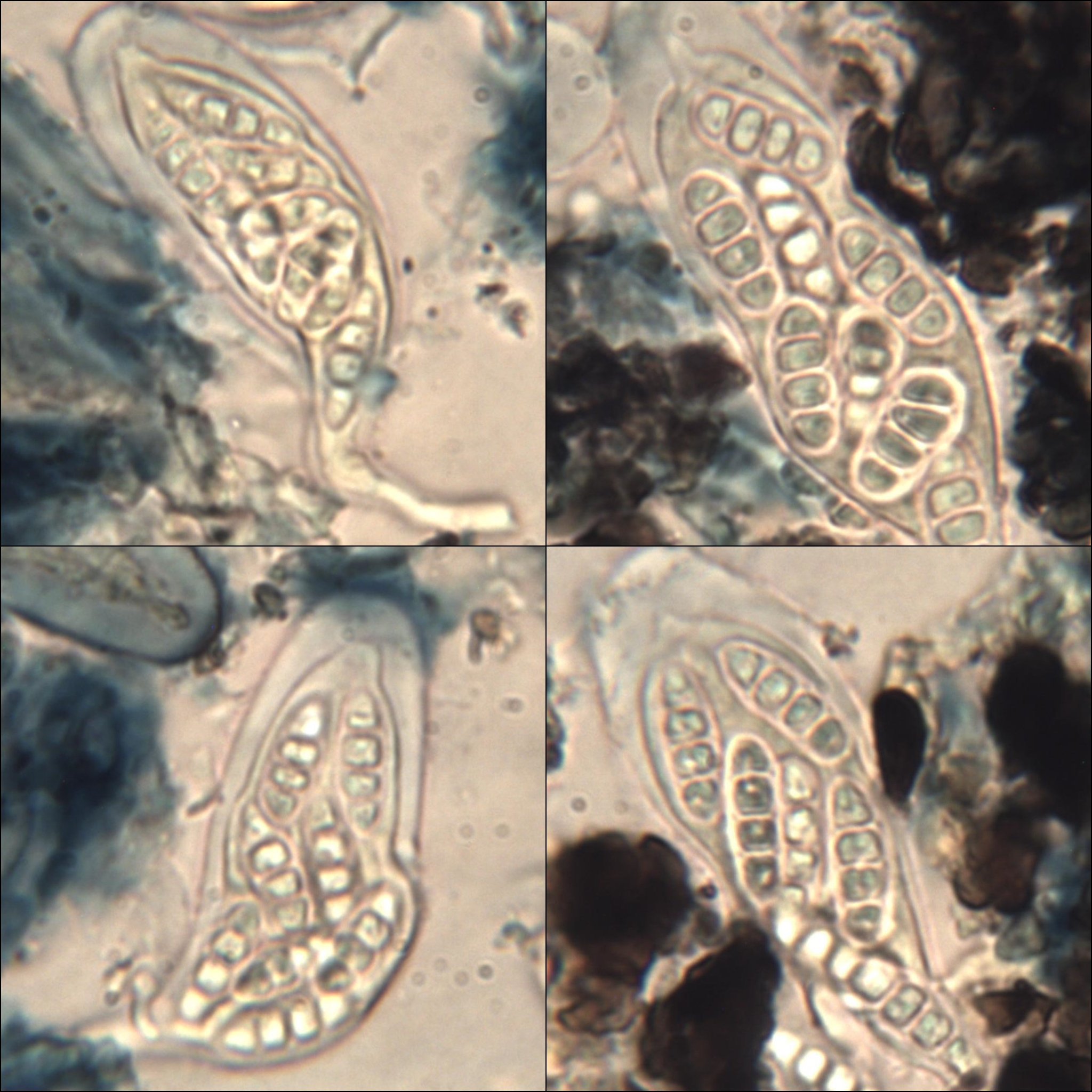
Asci and ascospores of the lichenicolous fungus Opegrapha physciaria; 1000x magnification

ascospore
A sexual, haploid spore produced in an ascus.
ascus
Plural asci. A sexual, fungal spore-bearing structure, typically sac-like.
aseptate
Lacking septa.
aspicilioid
Referring to lecanorine apothecia that are (at least initially) partially to completely immersed in the thallus.
astomate
Also astomous. Lacking an opening, or ostiole.
astrothelioid
Referring to a type of ascospore morphology prevalent in the genus Astrothelium; characterized by thick-walled distosepta and diamond-shaped lumina.
-ate
A suffix, added to nouns, used to indicate having the appearance or characteristics of that noun.
Atra-brown
A matt brown insoluble lichen pigment, associated with the reference species Opegrapha atra.
Atra-red
A dark red insoluble lichen pigment, associated with the reference species Tephromela atra.
aulaxinoid
A morphotype of corticolous thelotremoid lichens used to describe characteristics of apothecial and thallus structure. This term refers to a morphotype of lichen where the apothecia are partially embedded and partially protruding, having a dark, hardened thalline margin that forms irregular cracks. This morphotype is uniquely seen in "Thelotrema" dislaceratum, a species with uncertain taxonomic placement.

== B ==
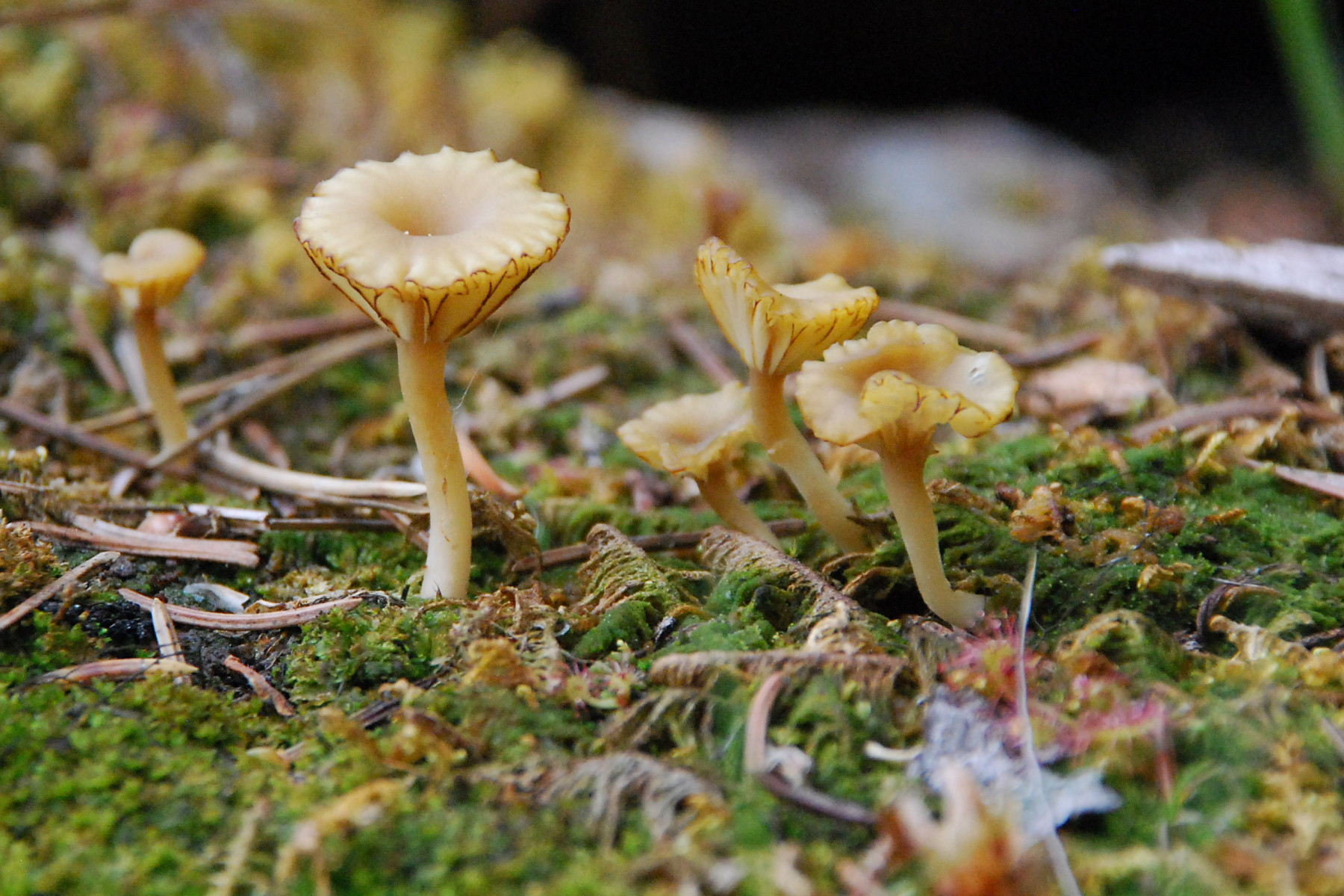
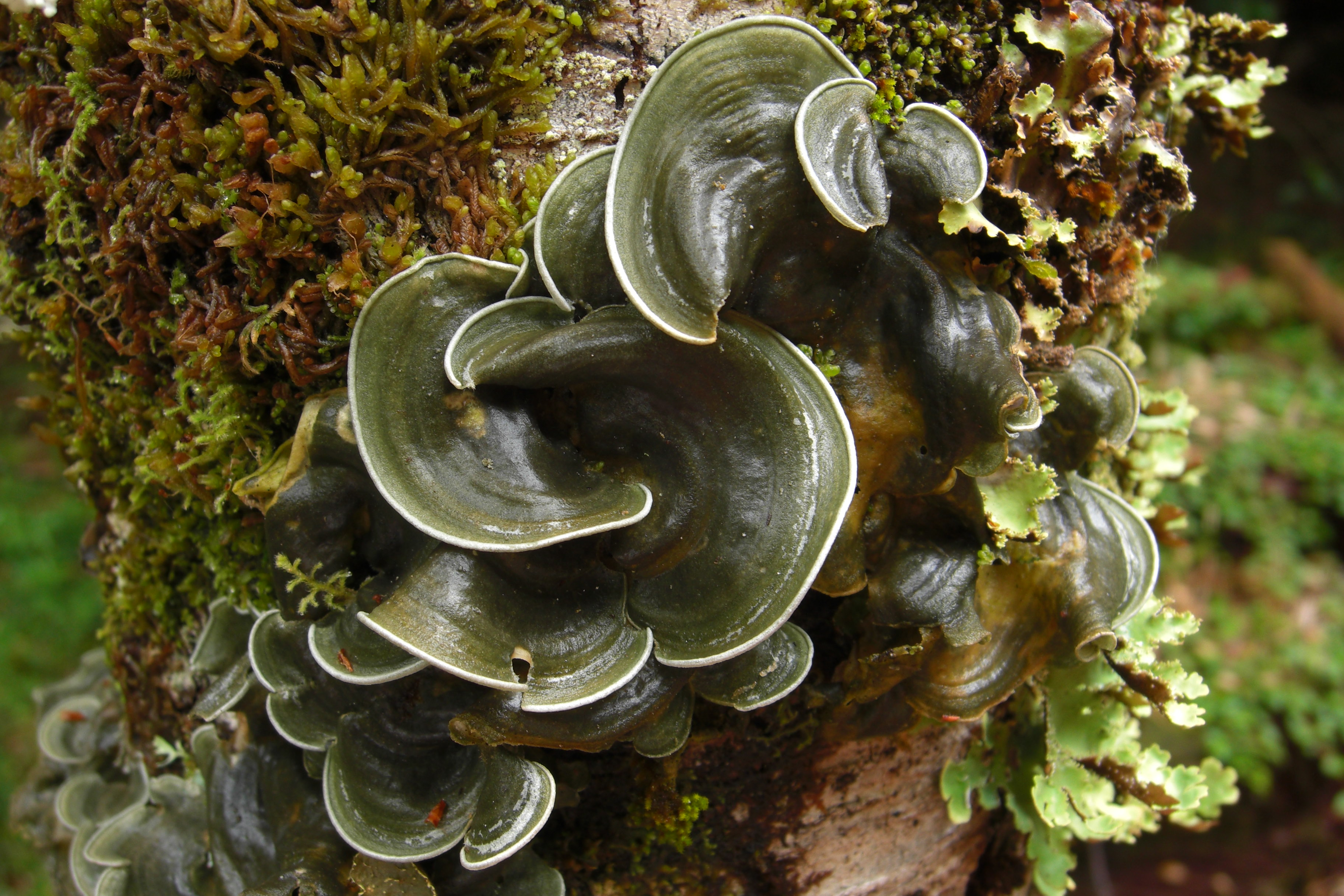
Lichenomphalia umbellifera (left) and Cora glabrata (right) are examples of basidiolichens.
bacillar
Also bacilliform, baculate, baculiform. Shaped like a small rod, typically with a length:width ratio of about 3:1.
Bagliettoana-brown
A pale to brownish-green insoluble lichen pigment, associated with the reference species Bacidia bagliettoana.
basidiolichen
A lichen in which the fungal partner (the mycobiont) is a member of the Basidiomycota. About 0.4% of lichens are basidiolichens. See related: ascolichen.
bi-
A prefix meaning two or twice.
biatorine
A type of lecideine apothecium with a soft, light-colored (not carbonized) margin, like those in genus Biatorella.
bifurcate
Divided into two parts or branches. See related: dichotomous.
bifusiform
Referring to a shape or structure that is elongated and tapers at both ends, with a constriction or narrowing in the middle. See related: fusiform.
biguttulate
Containing two oil droplets (guttules).
bilabiate
Referring to a type of ascus in which the ectotunica splits at the top and exposes the endotunica by forming an opening with a lip on each side; bilabiate asci occur in the genus Pertusaria.
bipartite lichen
A lichen with a two-partner symbiotic association of mycobiont and photobiont. See related: tripartite lichen.
bipolar lichen
A lichen that occurs in polar areas of both the Northern and Southern Hemispheres.
biseriate
Lined up in two parallel rows.
bitunicate
Also defined: endotunica, ectotunica. A type of ascus that has two functional layers, the internal layer, the endotunica, and the external layer, the ectotunica. Bitunicate asci are characteristic of the historical class Loculoascomycetes.
blastidium
Plural blastidia. A rounded granule-like propagule containing mycobiont and photobiont, produced from the thallus margin by budding; subsequent blastidia are formed from the tips of the previous ones. The term was introduced by Josef Poelt in 1980.
borderline lichen
A symbiotic interaction where either green algae or cyanobacteria are enveloped by fungal tissue, but without forming the discrete layers that occur in most lichens.
botryose
Resembling rounded, bead-like structures or clusters resembling grapes.

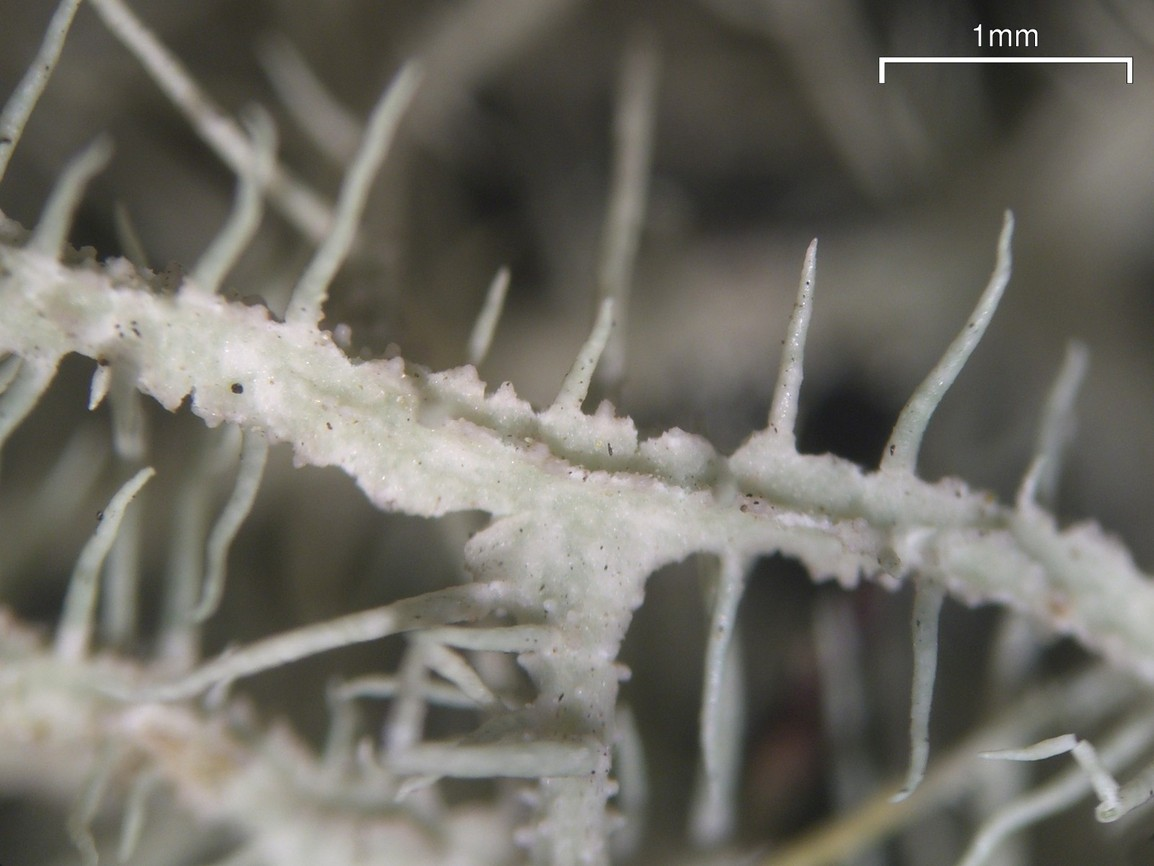
Usnea angulata is a fruticose lichen with ridged branches.

branch
A lateral growth of the main stem of a thallus in usneoid lichens; various features of a branch are diagnostically valuable in distinguishing species.
branchlet
A small branch.
bryophilous lichen
Also defined: hepaticolous lichen; muscicolous lichen. A lichen that grows on a moss or liverwort – i.e. on a bryophyte. A hepaticolous lichen is found only on liverworts, while a muscicolous lichen is found only on mosses.
bullate
Having blister-like or bubble-like swellings on a surface.
byssoid
Having the texture of cotton; made of loosely intertwined hyphae. See related: arachnoid, floccose.

== C ==
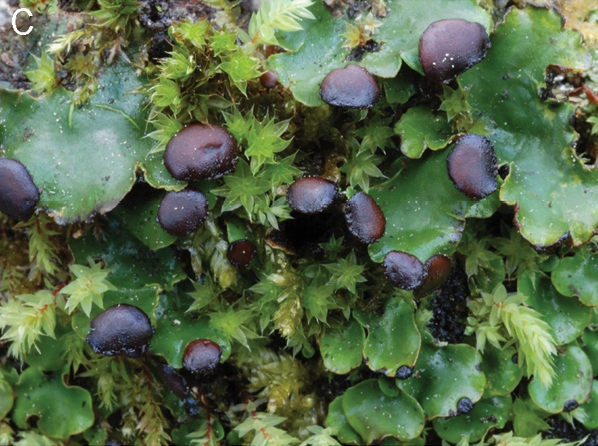
The prominent dark cephalodia on the surface of Peltigera venosa contain cyanobacteria.

C test
A spot test that uses a solution of bleach (sodium hypochlorite) as a reagent to check for the presence of certain lichen products.
Caesiocinerea-brown
An insoluble lichen pigment, colored olive to sordid green to black, associated with the reference species Aspicilia caesiocinerea.
caesious
A bluish-gray or bluish-green coloration.
caespitose
Also caespitous, cespitose. Growing in dense clusters or tufts, often used to describe fungi that arise from a common base or grow closely together without fusing.
calcicolous lichen
A lichen that grows on substrates rich in calcium carbonate, such as calcareous or gypseous rocks or soil.
calcifuge
A lichen that prefers acidic soils and tends to avoid, or is intolerant of, alkaline conditions often associated with high calcium carbonate content; opposite of calcicole.
campylidium
Plural campylidia. A helmet-shaped conidioma. They are found in several genera of tropical foliicolous lichens, such as Badimia, Loflammia, and Sporopodium. The term was introduced by Johannes Müller Argoviensis in 1881.

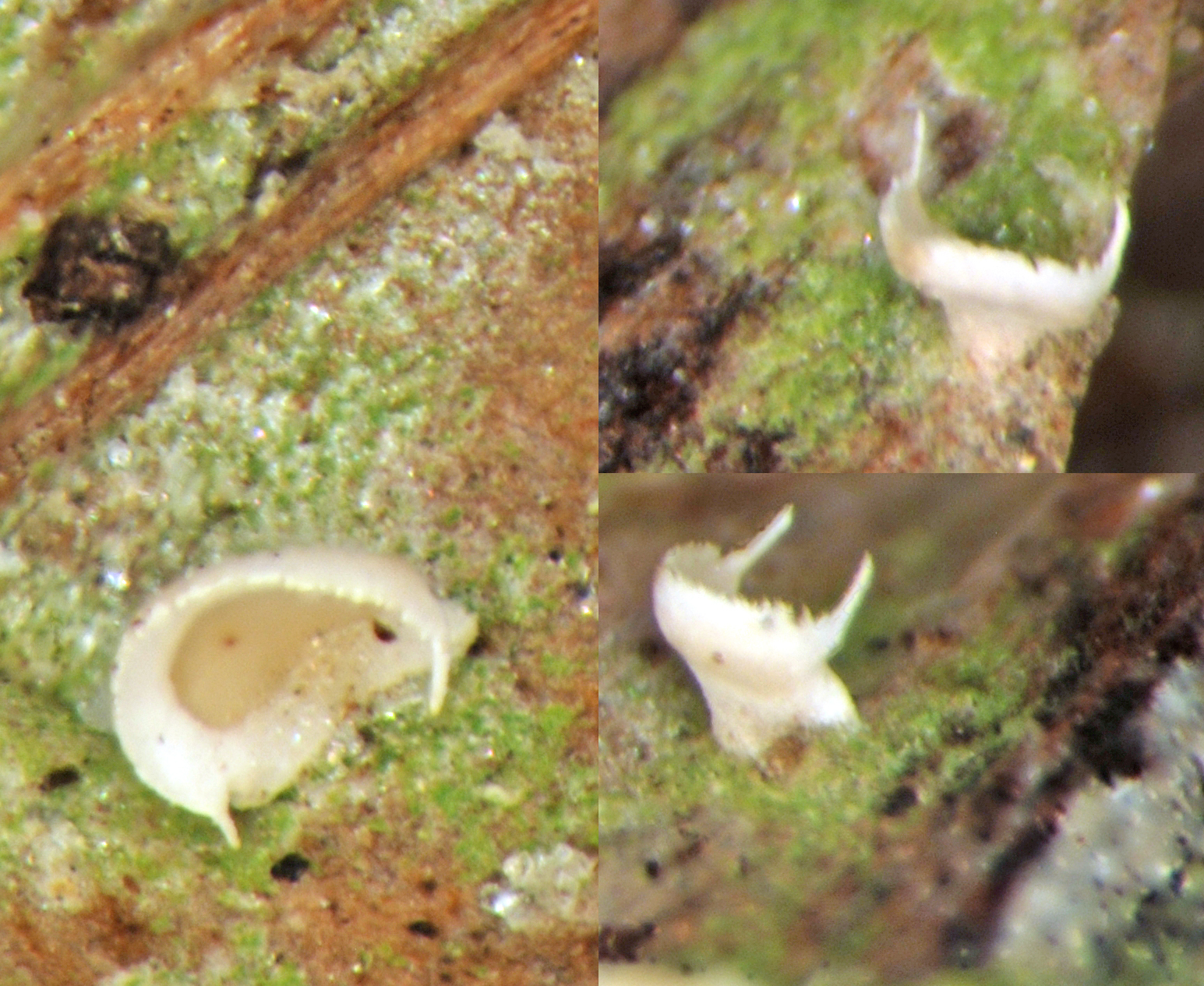
Campylidia of the foliicolous lichen Badimiella pteridophila

canaliculate
Having one or more longitudinal grooves or channels.
capitate
Having a well-formed head, usually spherical or hemispherical in shape. See related: fuscocapitate.
capitulum
Plural capitula; also sphaeridium/sphaeridia. A more-or-less spherical or cup-shaped apothecium on the top of a stalk, found in the genera Calicium and Chaenotheca. See related: mazaedium.
carbonized
Also carbonised, carbonaceous. Blackened and brittle tissue resulting from the accumulation of pigments.
cariose
A lichen thallus or structure that is cracked, split, spongy, or otherwise decayed or in a state of disintegration.
cartilaginous
Also (in taxonomic names) cartilagineus. A term used to describe the texture of certain parts of a lichen. Cartilaginous structures have a texture similar to animal cartilage – firm but somewhat pliable, not brittle or soft.
cataphysis
See pseudoparaphysis.

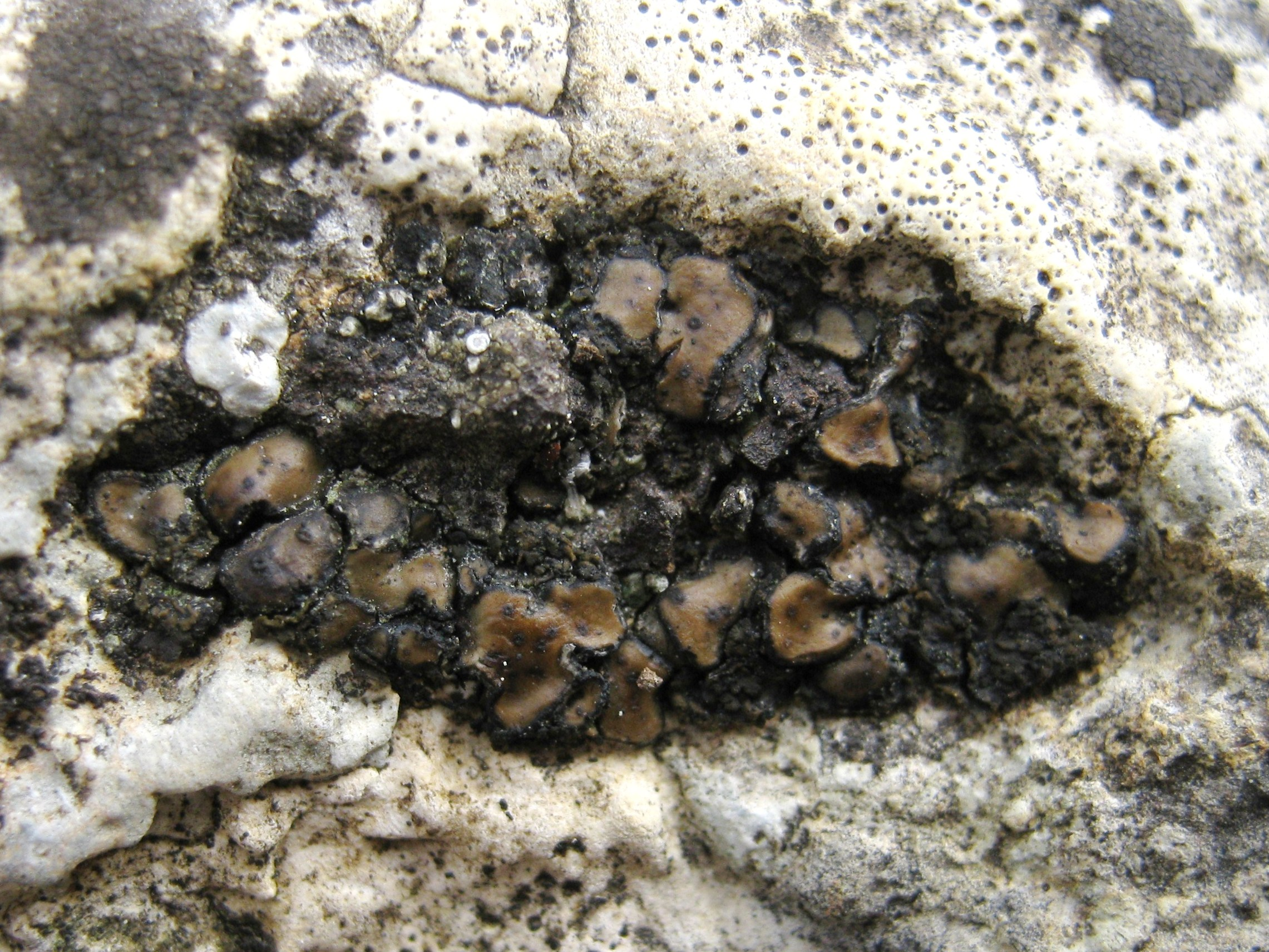
The squamulose species Catapyrenium boccanum, seen here growing in a depression of a calcareous rock, is a catapyrenioid lichen.

catapyrenioid lichen
A member of the Verrucariaceae that is squamulose, has simple ascospores (without any septa), and lacks algae in the hymenium; historically classified in the genus Catapyrenium.
catenate
Arranged in chains or end-to-end; refers to spore arrangement.
caudate
Having a tail or tail-like appendage.
cavernula
Plural cavernulae. A small hollow or cavity; used to refer to the holes in the lower cortex of the genus Cavernularia.
central axis
Also chondroid axis. The cartilage-like central core in the branches of usneoid lichens, made of longitudinally arranged hyphae. The term "chondroid axis" was first used by William Nylander in 1858.
cephalodium
Plural cephalodia. A small gall-like structure that contains cyanobacteria, found in some lichens. These structures can be located on the lichen's upper or lower surface, or within the thallus itself. These structures are found in most lichens that contain both algal and cyanobacterial photobionts. The term was first used by Erik Acharius in 1803.
cerebriform
Having a surface texture that is deeply wrinkled or convoluted in a manner resembling the structure of a brain. The term is used to characterize the appearance of certain lichens with a complex, highly folded thallus.
cetrarioid lichen
An informal growth form category used for lichens with erect, foliose thalli, and apothecia and pycnidia on the margins of the lobes; characteristic of lichens previously classified in the genus Cetraria (in the broad sense).
chalaroplectenchyma
Plural chalaroplectenchymata. A type of plectenchyma comprising loosely interwoven hyphae with holes; found in the medulla of some lichens.
character
A distinguishing feature that is characteristic for an organism; equivalent to phenotypic trait.
chasmoendolith
Also chasmoendolithic. A type of organism, typically a lichen or fungus, that lives within cracks and fissures of rocks. See related: endolith.
checklist
A list of all of the species (sometimes including subspecies, varieties and forms) that occur within a particular region.
chemosyndrome
A set of lichen products produced by a species; this typically includes one or more major compounds and a set of biosynthetically related minor compounds.
chemotype
Chemically differing types of a species with the same morphological characteristics, of no or unknown taxonomic significance.

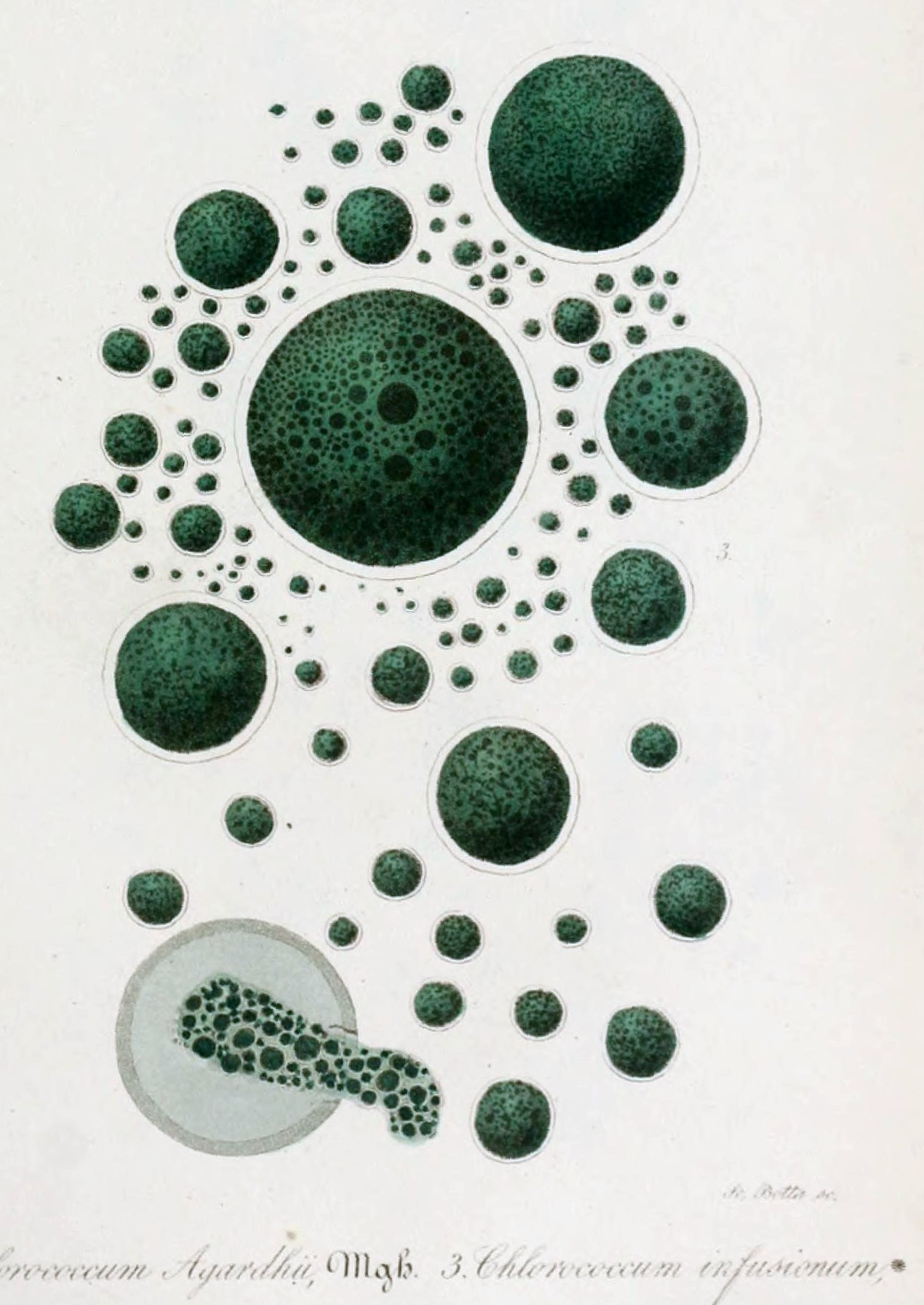
Chlorococcum infusionum, depicted in this 1843 illustration by Giuseppe Giovanni Antonio Meneghini, is a typical chlorococcoid green alga.

chlorococcoid
A term describing green algae with a coccoid shape.
chlorolichen
A lichen containing green algae (Chlorophyta) as its primary photobiont. The term serves as a counterpart to "cyanolichen" (lichens with cyanobacterial photobionts) and is preferred over the historically ambiguous term "phycolichen". It refers to the vast majority of eukaryotic lichen photobionts which belong to the division Chlorophyta.
chondroid axis
See central axis.
chroodiscoid
A morphotype of corticolous thelotremoid lichens used to describe characteristics of apothecial and thallus structure. Chroodiscoid lichens have open apothecia with recurved lobules and a smooth and more or less shiny thallus; this morphotype occurs in the genera Acanthotrema and Chapsa.
cilium
Plural cilia. Fine, hair-like outgrowths of the thallus or apothecium, common in foliose and fruticose lichens.
ciliate
Having cilia.
Cinereorufa-green
A green to turquoise insoluble lichen pigment, associated with the reference species Schaereria cinereorufa.
citriform
A shape or form that resembles a lemon or citrus fruit. The term is used to describe structures, particularly ascospores or other components of a lichen, that have an elongated, oval shape with tapered ends.
CK test
A seldom-used spot test performed with an application of C followed immediately by K.
cladoniiform lichen
Also cladoniform lichen, dimorphic lichen. Also defined: primary thallus and secondary thallus. A lichen with a two-fold growth form that includes both a crustose, squamulose, or foliose form and a fruticose form; the thallus differentiates into both horizontal (primary thallus) and vertical (secondary thallus, or podetium) structures. Cladoniiform lichens occur in the families Cladoniaceae and Baeomycetaceae.
clavate
Also claviform. A shape resembling a club, broader at one end and tapering towards the other; typically used to refer to ascospores and asci.
clypeate
See peltate.
coalescent
Also coalesced. Growing together to form one mass.
coccoid
Spherical; resembling a coccus.
collar
In some Leptogium lichens, a ring at the apex of the apothecium made up of one, occasionally up to three, continuous lamellar folds encircling the disk; these folds may arise from laterally fused lobules and are distinct from separate, true lobules.
colloplectenchyma
A type of apothecial tissue made up of slightly rounded cells with somewhat thickened walls, resembling the angular collenchyma of vascular plants; distinguished from paraplectenchyma, which consists of thin-walled, parenchyma-like cells.
columella
A sterile, central column of tissue that extends upward within some lichen fruiting bodies (such as mazaedia or perithecia), typically from the base toward or to the apex.
complanate
Flat and smooth.
concolorous
Having the same color throughout.
confervoid
Appearing loosely filamentous or thread-like.
confluent
Joining together, blending into one.

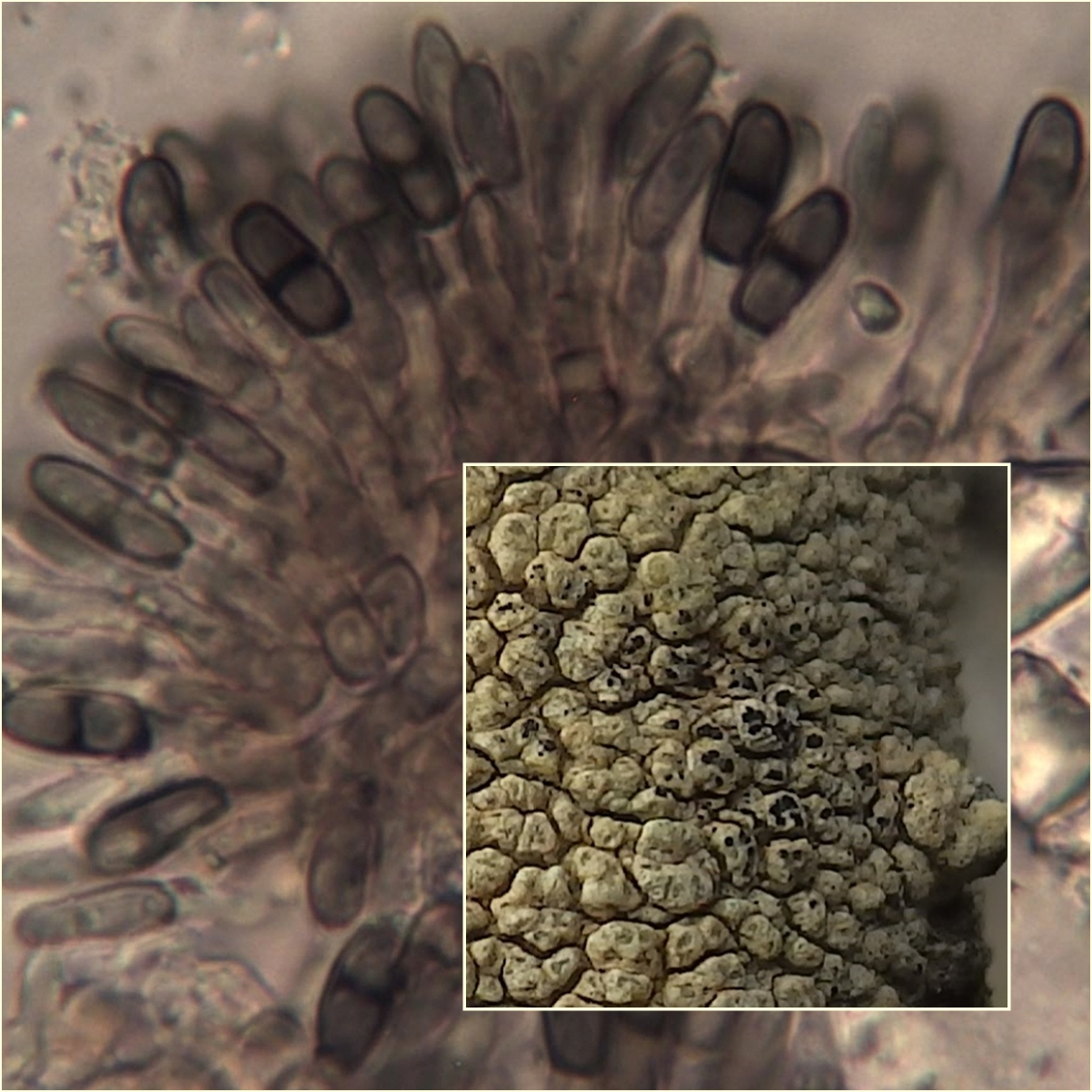
Microscopic view of the radially arranged conidia in a conidiophore from Minutoexcipula, a lichenicolous fungus; the inset shows the fungus (visible as black spots) parasitizing its host, a crustose lichen in genus Pertusaria.

conidiophore
A specialized hyphal structure that produces and bears conidia.
conidium
Plural conidia. Also conidiospore. A fungal asexual spore produced by mitosis in specialized structures such as pycnidia and campylidia.
conglutinate
Also conglutinated. Stuck or glued together; usually applied to hyphae or paraphyses.
consoredium
An aggregation or cluster of incompletely separated soredia. The term was introduced by Tor Tønsberg in 1992.
coralloid
Highly branched, similar to a coral in form.
coriacellate
With a somewhat leathery (coriaceous) texture.
coriaceous
With a leathery texture.
corrugate
Wrinkled; with alternate furrows and ridges.
cortex
The lichen's outer layer(s), made up of tightly woven fungal filaments.
corticate
Also cortical. Having a cortex.
corticolous lichen
A lichen that grows on bark.
crateriform
Shaped like a bowl or a crater; hemispherical and concave.
crenate
Having a scalloped or round-toothed edge.
crenulate
Having a finely scalloped edge; similar to crenate but with smaller notches.
cruentodiscoid
A morphotype of corticolous thelotremoid lichens used to describe characteristics of apothecial and thallus morphology. Cruentodiscoid lichens have open apothecia with erect lobules and a pigmented disc, and a smooth, more or less shiny thallus; this morphotype occurs in the genus Chapsa.
crustose
A form of growth where the lichen is pressed so tightly against the substrate upon which it grows that it is impossible to remove without destroying either it or part of the substrate. Crustose lichens have a cortex only on their upper surface.
cryptoendolith
Also cryptoendolithic. A type of organism, particularly certain lichens and fungi, that live inside rocks or in the microscopic spaces within the mineral grains of rocks. See related: endolith.
cryptolecanorine
A lecanorine apothecium that is mostly immersed in the thallus, with an indistinct thalline margin.
cryptothalline
Pertaining to a type of lichen thallus that is largely hidden or immersed within the substrate, making it barely visible or entirely concealed. See related: chasmoendolithic, cryptoendolithic, endolithic. Contrast: euthalline.
crystallocumuli
Punctiform or elongated agglomerations of oxalate crystals that are dispersed over the thallus; associated with the family Porinaceae. See related: crystallostratum.
crystallostratum
A continuous layer of oxalate crystals embedded in the thallus, associated with the family Porinaceae. The term was introduced by Josef Hafellner and Klaus Kalb in 1995. See related: crystallocumuli.
cuculate
Hood-shaped.
cupulate
Cup-shaped.
cuneate
Also cuneiform. Wedge-shaped; with one end thinner than the other.
cyanolichen
A lichen in which the photobiont is a cyanobacteria.

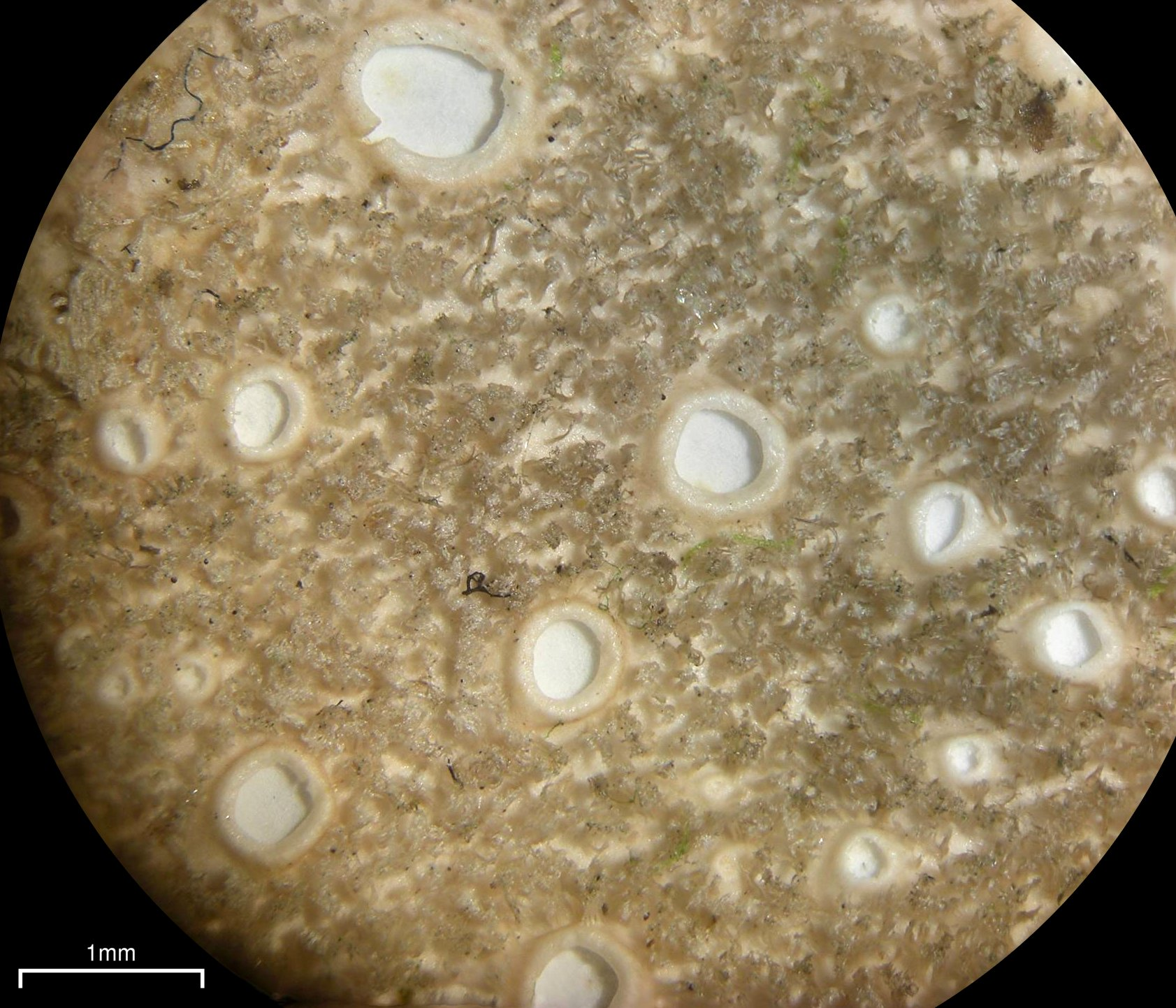
Closeup of the thallus underside of a Sticta lichen showing its crater-like cyphellae; scale bar = 1 mm

cyphella
Plural cyphellae. A sharply defined, rounded, ovate, or shapeless pore in the lower thallus surface (typically the lower cortex), which is lined with a "pseudocortex" made of loosely connected, non-gelatinized hyphae (often with globular cells, formed from the medulla) and bounded by a pale ring; known to occur in the genera Sticta and Oropogon. The term was first used by Erik Acharius in 1799.

== D ==
dactyloid
See digitate.
decorticate
Having had a cortex that has been removed or disintegrated. See related: ecorticate.
decumbent
Lying flat on a substrate with the edges curled up.
dendritic
Irregularly branched, like a tree.
dentate
Having a toothlike or serrated edge.
denticulate
Having small tooth-like projections or serrations along the edge.
dextrinoid
A chemical property referring to a substance's ability to turn reddish-brown in the presence of Melzer's reagent or iodine due to the presence of dextrins. This color reaction is also called hemiamyloid or pseudoamyloid.
determinate
Having well-defined or clearly marked edges. Contrast: effuse.
diagnosis
A brief account of a taxon describing the essential characteristics that distinguish it from its relatives.
diahypha
Plural diahyphae. A type of conidium formed from hyphae that split apically in several branches, with prominent constrictions at the septa, resulting in the appearance of chain links; found in the family Gomphillaceae.
diaspore
A sexual or asexual propagule used for dispersal; in lichens, usually used to refer to isidia and soredia.
dichotomous
Branching into two equal parts. See related: bifurcate. Contrast: anisotomic.
diffuse
Spread out and scattered without any definite boundary or margin. See related: effuse. Contrast: determinate.

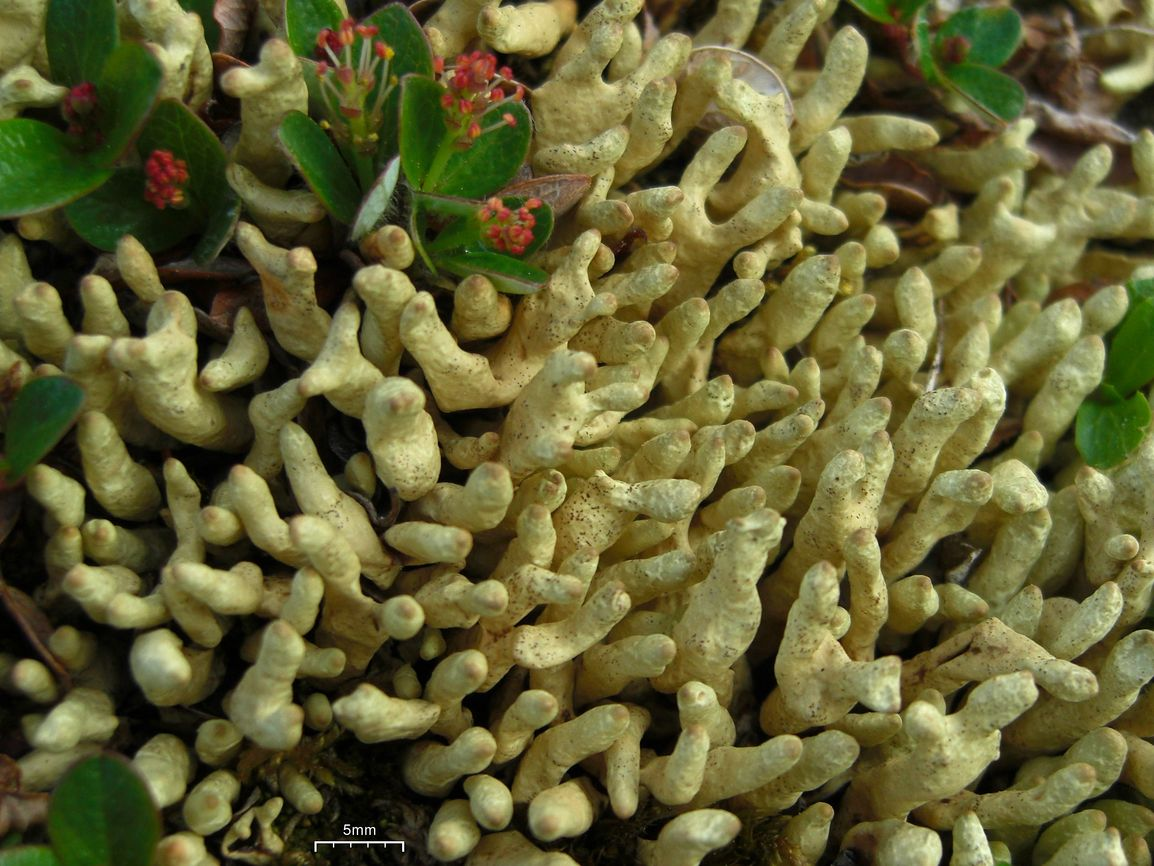
The thallus of the fruticose Arctic finger lichen (Dactylina arctica) consists of mostly unbranched, digitate stalks.

digitate
Also dactyloid, dactyliform, digitiform. Having finger-like outgrowths.
dimidiate
A structure that is divided into two unequal halves, often appearing as half-circles; in lichenology the term is often applied to the excipulum.
dimorphic lichen
See cladoniiform lichen.
discoid
Also: disciform. A shape that is flat and circular, resembling a disk. In lichenology, this term often refers to the apothecia of lichens that have a flat, disk-like shape.
discolichen
A grouping of ascolichens that produce disk-like apothecia, somewhat analogous to the fungal Discomycetes; the term applies to the majority of lichens.
discothecium
Plural discothecia. The fruiting body of certain types of lichens, with cylindrical, bitunicate asci. It is distinguished from a hysterothecium, which is another type of fruiting body, by not opening through a slit but by expanding the asci to weather or push apart the typically thin upper stromatal layer. The term was introduced by Richard P. Korf in 1962.
disk
Also: disc. The curved or flat upper surface of the hymenium in an apothecium, often pigmented and surrounded by a margin or rim.
distal
Positioned away from a point of origin or from the center of a body.
distoseptum
Plural distosepta. A type of septum found in some conidia and ascospores, which is located within but distinct from the outer wall and surrounds the internal lumina. Structures with distosepta are said to be distoseptate.
doliiform
Barrel-shaped.
dome
See tholus.

== E ==
e-
A prefix meaning "not having" or "without".
eccentric
Also excentric. Displaced from the center.
echinate
Covered with spines or bristles.
echinulate
Covered with small spines or bristles.
ecorticate
Lacking bark, or a cortex.
ectal excipulum
See proper exciple.
ecto-
A prefix meaning "outside" or "outer".
ectotunica
See bitunicate.

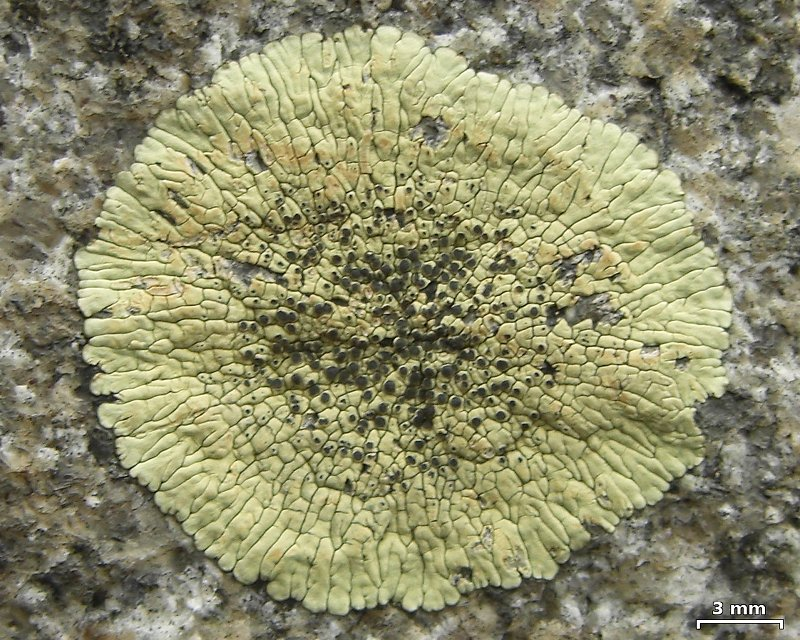
This saxicolous Dimelaena lichen has a placodioid growth form and an effigurate thallus outline.

effigurate
Referring to crustose, areolate lichens with marginal areoles that are extended and arranged radially; also defined more generally as "obscurely lobed".
effuse
Spread out and flat; used to describe the thallus of some crustose lichens lacking a well-defined outline. Contrast: determinate.
eguttulate
Lacking oil droplets (guttules).
Elachista-brown
A fuscous brown insoluble lichen pigment, associated with the reference species Micarea elachista.
ellipsoid
An object appearing approximately elliptical in longitudinal section and circular in cross-section; often used to refer to spore shape.
emarginate
Also immarginate. Lacking a well-defined border or edge. When referring to apothecia, it means lacking a thalline exciple, or a raised proper exciple. See related: effuse, marginate.
endo-
Also end-, ecto-, ect-. A prefix meaning "inside" or "inner".
endocarpic
Also endocarpinoid. Referring to lichens with perithecia that are sunk into the tissues of the thallus, such as seen in the genera Endocarpon and Dermatocarpon.
endolichenic fungus
A fungus that lives within the thallus of a lichen without producing any visible symptoms of disease; these fungi are transmitted horizontally.

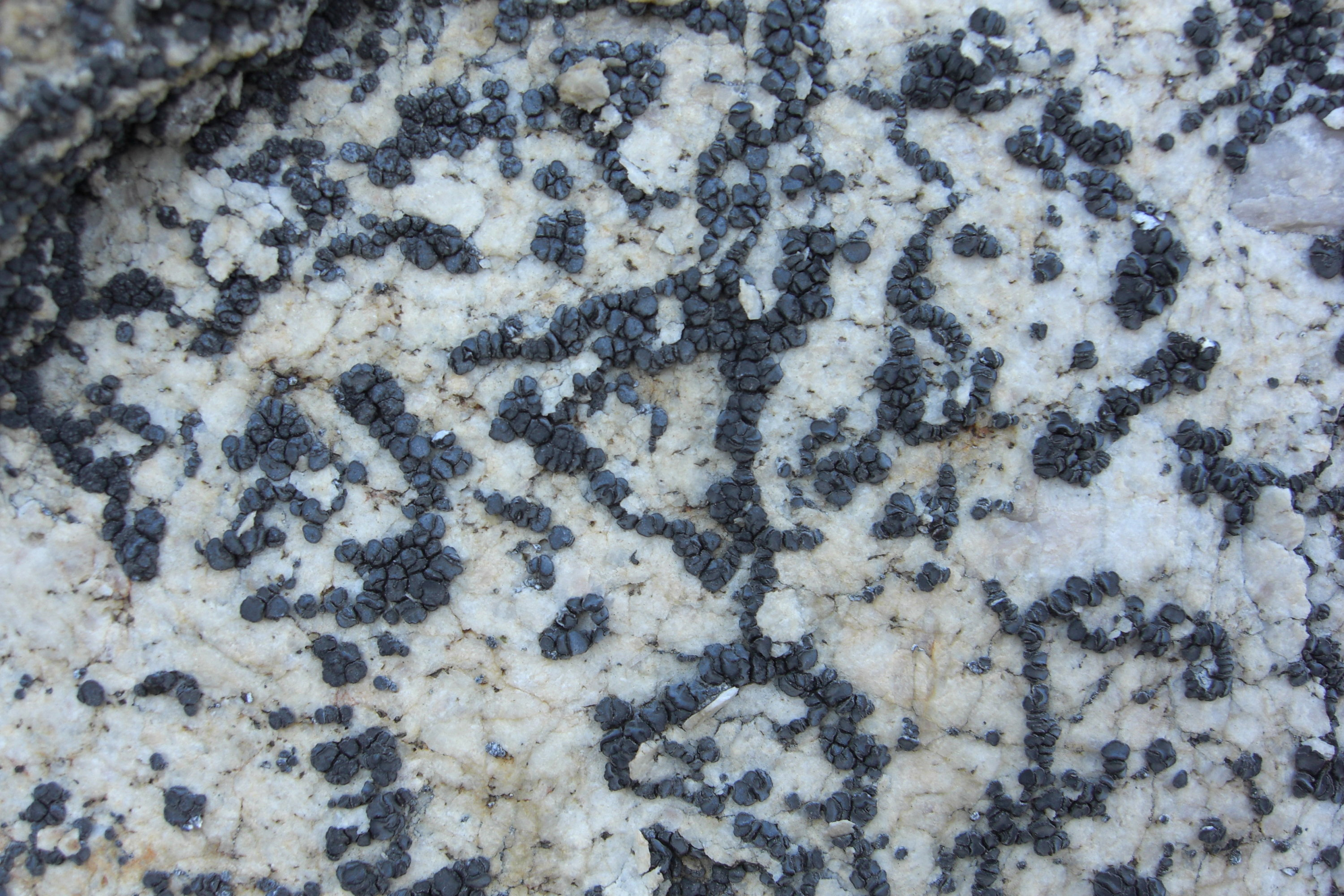
Lecidea laboriosa is an endolithic lichen; the thallus, hardly visible, grows under and around the rock crystals, while the apothecia are visible on the surface.

endolith
Also endolithic. A crustose lichen that grows in the interior of rocks (under and around the rock crystals), typically with little or no visible thallus on the outer rock surface. Contrast: epilithic. See related: chasmoendolith, cryptoendolith, euendolith.
endophloeodal
Also endophloeodic, endophloeic, endophloic. Refers to crustose lichens whose thalli are more or less immersed in tree bark. Contrast: epiphloedal.
endotunica
See bitunicate.
entire
Refers to margins or edges of lichen structures (such as apothecia, lobes, or thalli) that are smooth and unbroken, without any notches, teeth, or irregularities.
epi-
Also ep-. A prefix meaning "upon" or "above".
epibryophyllous
Also epibryophytic. Referring to organisms, particularly lichens or fungi, that grow on the surface of mosses (bryophytes).
epicortex
A thin layer of polysaccharides that is present on the surface of the cortex in some parmelioid lichens.
epihymenium
A thin tissue layer of interwoven hyphae situated directly above the hymenium, which can contain pigments and sometimes plays a role in the coloration of the lichen. Compare: epithecium.
epilithic
Also petricolous, rupicolous, saxicolous. A crustose lichen that grows on the surface of rocks. Contrast: endolithic.
epinecral layer
A layer of dead hyphae with indistinct lumina found near the cortex and above the algal layer. See related: hyponecral layer.
epiphloedal
Also epiphloeodal, epiphloeodic, epiphloic. Growing on the surface of bark. Contrast: endophloeodal.
epipsamma
A region of granule-like, often pigmented material, that permeates the upper parts of hymenium but is distinct from the epithecium; associated with the genus Rhizocarpon. The term was coined by Josef Poelt in 1969.
epithecium
Plural epithecia. Tissue on the top of an apothecium (above the hymenium) formed from the coalesced tips of projecting paraphyses. The term was first used by Julius von Flotow in 1851.
epruinose
Lacking pruina.
erumpent
Also perrumpent. Breaking through a surface. A more precise definition has been suggested by Aptroot and Lücking, who propose that the term applies to ascomata and pseudostromata that are more than 1/2 to 3/4 above the level of the thallus.
esorediate
Also esorediose. Lacking soredia.
eucortex
Plural eucortices or eucortexes. A cortex made of well-differentiated tissue. Another sense of the term, used by Josef Poelt, refers to cortical tissue made entirely of fungal cells originating from a cambium-like tissue layer in or above the algal layer. The term eucortex was first used by Gunnar Degelius in 1954.
euendolith
Also euendolithic. A type of organism, often a lichen or microbe, that actively bores into and resides within the mineral matrix of rocks or other hard substrates. See related: endolithic.
euthalline
Describing a type of lichen thallus that is clearly visible and well-developed on the surface of the substrate. See related: epilithic. Contrast: cryptothalline.
evanescent
Lasting a short time.
excipulum thallinum
See thalline margin.

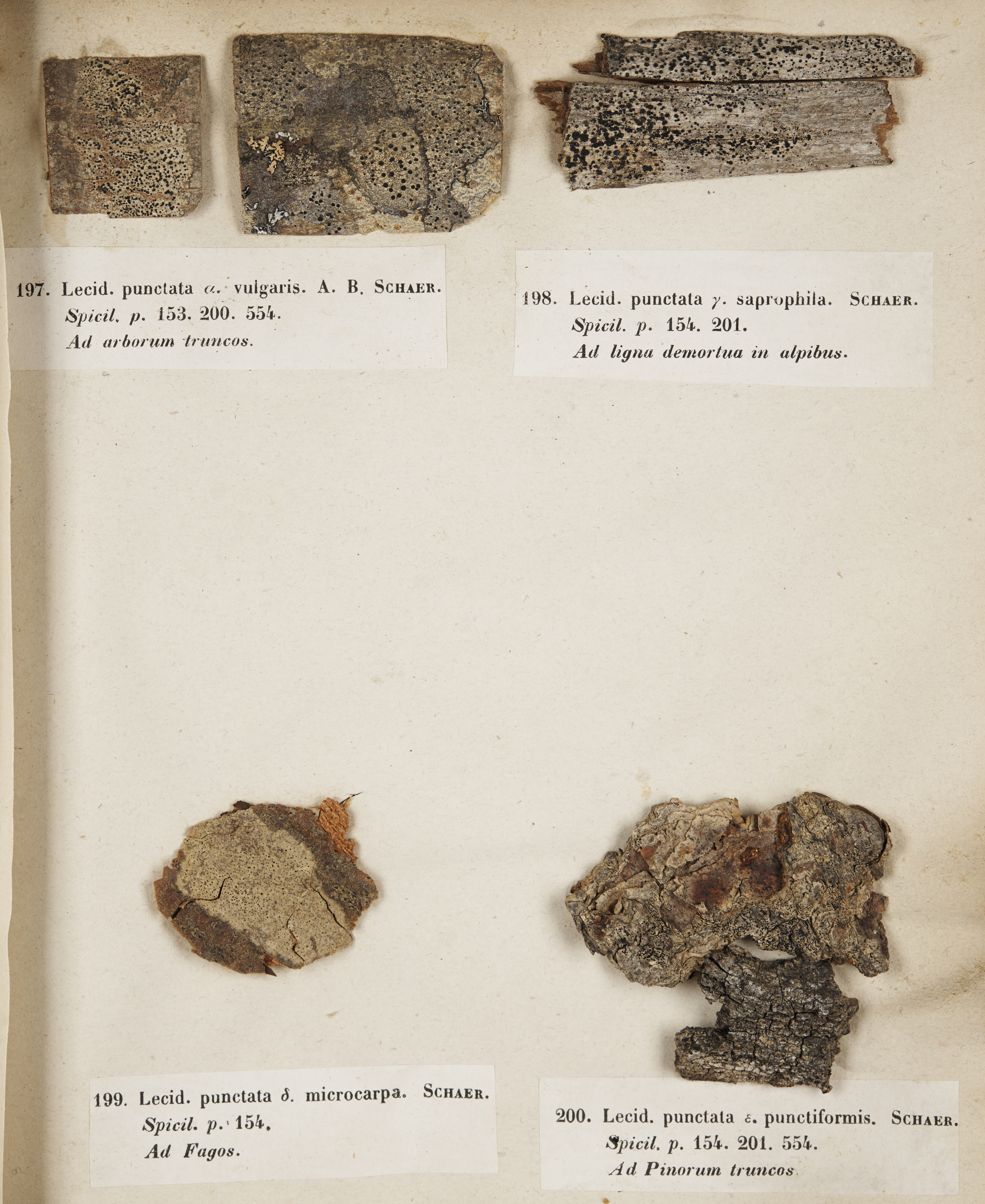
A sample page from Ludwig Schaerer's exsiccata series Lichenes Helvetici (Swiss lichens), published in 26 fascicles from 1823 to 1852.

exsiccatum
Plurals: exsiccata (from exsiccatum), exsiccatae (from exsiccata when used as singular for a collection), exsiccati (from exsiccatus). A dried and labeled herbarium specimen, often part of a numbered set.
excipulum
Plural excipula. Also exciple (plural exciples). The cup-shaped or ring-shaped layer of tissue supporting the hymenium in an apothecium; this tissue sometimes develops into a distinct margin, as in the lecanorine apothecia. See related: proper margin, thallin margin.

== F ==
fabiform
Bean-shaped.
facultatively lichenicolous
A fungus species that is commonly collected from lichens (i.e., it is lichenicolous) but is also capable of living on non-lichen substrates.
falcate
Also falciform, lunate. Thin and curved with pointed ends, like a scythe or sickle.
farinaceous
Also farinose. Covered with a mealy powder; the podetia of Cladonia deformis are covered with farinose soredia.

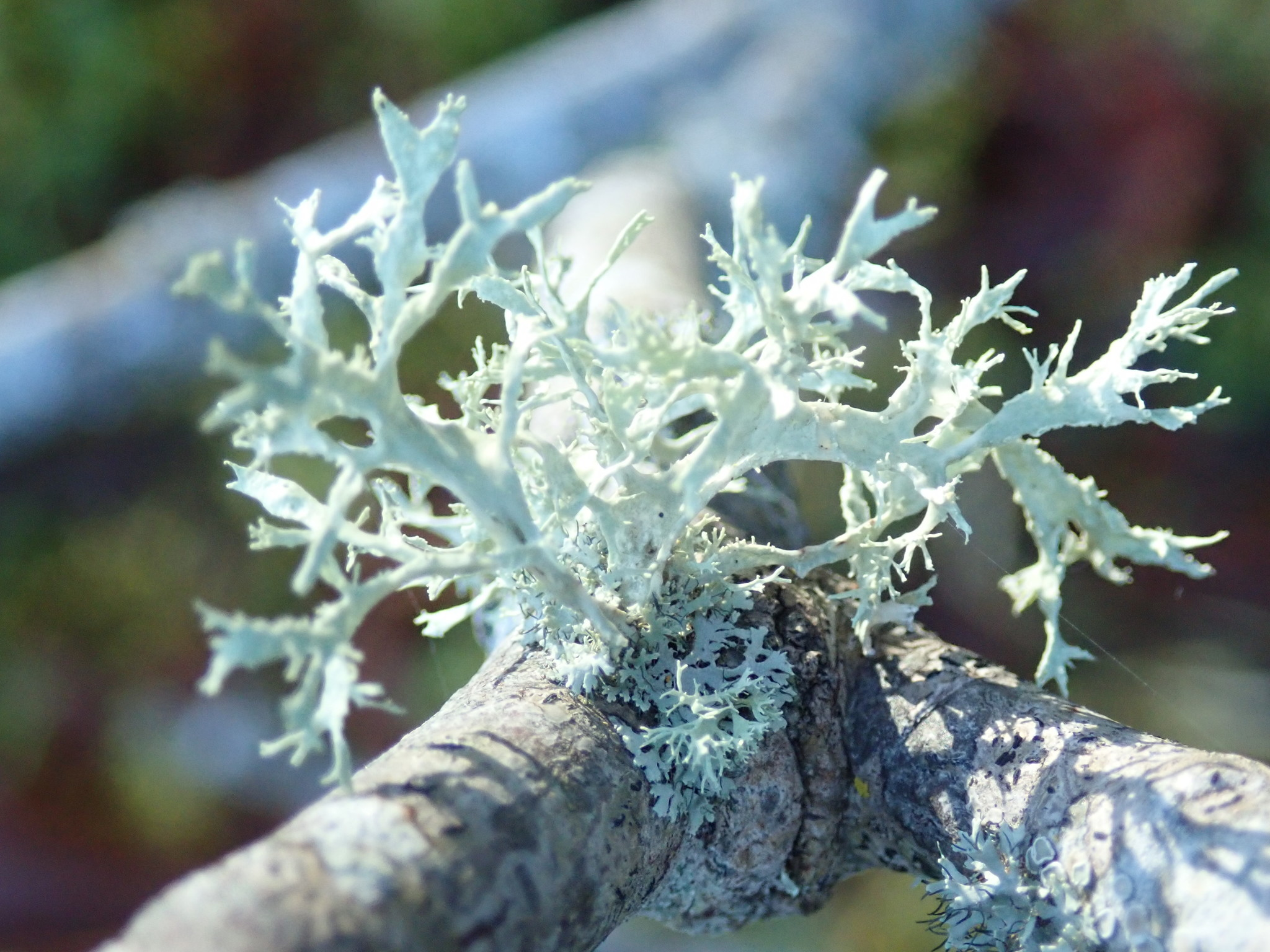
The fruticose lichen Ramalina farinacea has a thallus made of fasciate branches.

fasciate
Also fasciated. Having a ribbon-like or band-like structure, such as the thallus of some fruticose lichens.
fascicle
A bundle or cluster; can be used to refer to asci, conidiophores, hyphae, etc.
fasciculate
Arranged in bundles or clusters.

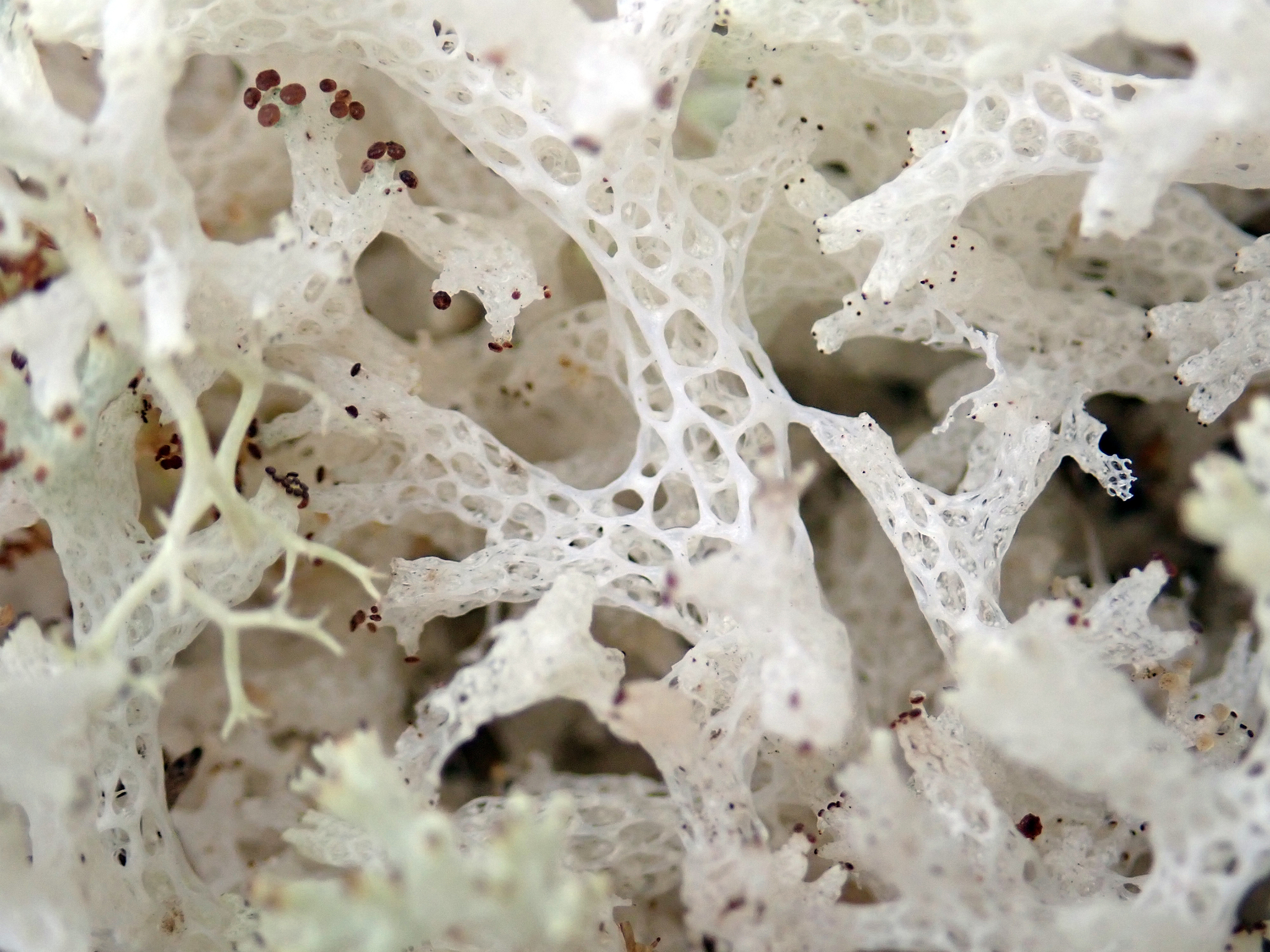
Pulchrocladia retipora has fenestrate lobes.

fastigiate cortex
A region of the cortex where the hyphae are aligned perpendicularly to the main axis of the thallus. The term was first used by Auguste-Marie Hue in 1906. See related: palisade cell.
faveolate
Pitted with large, deep depressions that are narrowly separated by sharp ridges. Compare: alveolate, foveolate, scrobiculate.
fenestrate
Having perforations or gaps arranged in a regular pattern.
-fer
Also -ferous. A suffix meaning to carry or produce.
fibercle
A scar on lichen thalli resulting from the breaking of attached fibrils; associated with the genus Usnea.
fibril
A tiny fibre; when referring to the genus Usnea, it means short branches that are perpendicular to the main branches.
fibrillose
Covered with silky fibres.
filiform
Thread-like; fine and slender.
fimbriate
Having hairs or fibres on the margin. See related: arachnoid, fimbrillate.
fimbrillate
Delicately fimbriate; bordered with minute fringe.
fissitunicate
A form of bitunicate ascus in which the flexible layers of the inner wall (the endotunica) and the more rigid layers of the outer wall (the ectotunica) are physically separated; as a consequence, the inner walls extend past the outer walls before the spores are released.
fissurine
Also fissurate. A term used characterize a structure or surface displaying a pattern of narrow, elongated cracks or fissures.
fissurinoid
A morphotype of corticolous thelotremoid lichens used to describe characteristics of apothecial and thallus structure. This morphotype is somewhat similar to the chroodiscoid, but it differentiates by the way the apothecia open through irregular thallus cracks, finally resembling chroodiscoid apothecia. It often has a unique elongated form at maturity and can be seen in species such as Acanthotrema brasilianum and various Chapsa species.
fistular
Also fistulose. Tubular and hollow.
flabellate
Also flabelliform. Fan-shaped.
flexuous
Also flexuose. Bending or curving in alternate directions, like a zigzag.
floccose
Having the texture of loose cotton or wool.

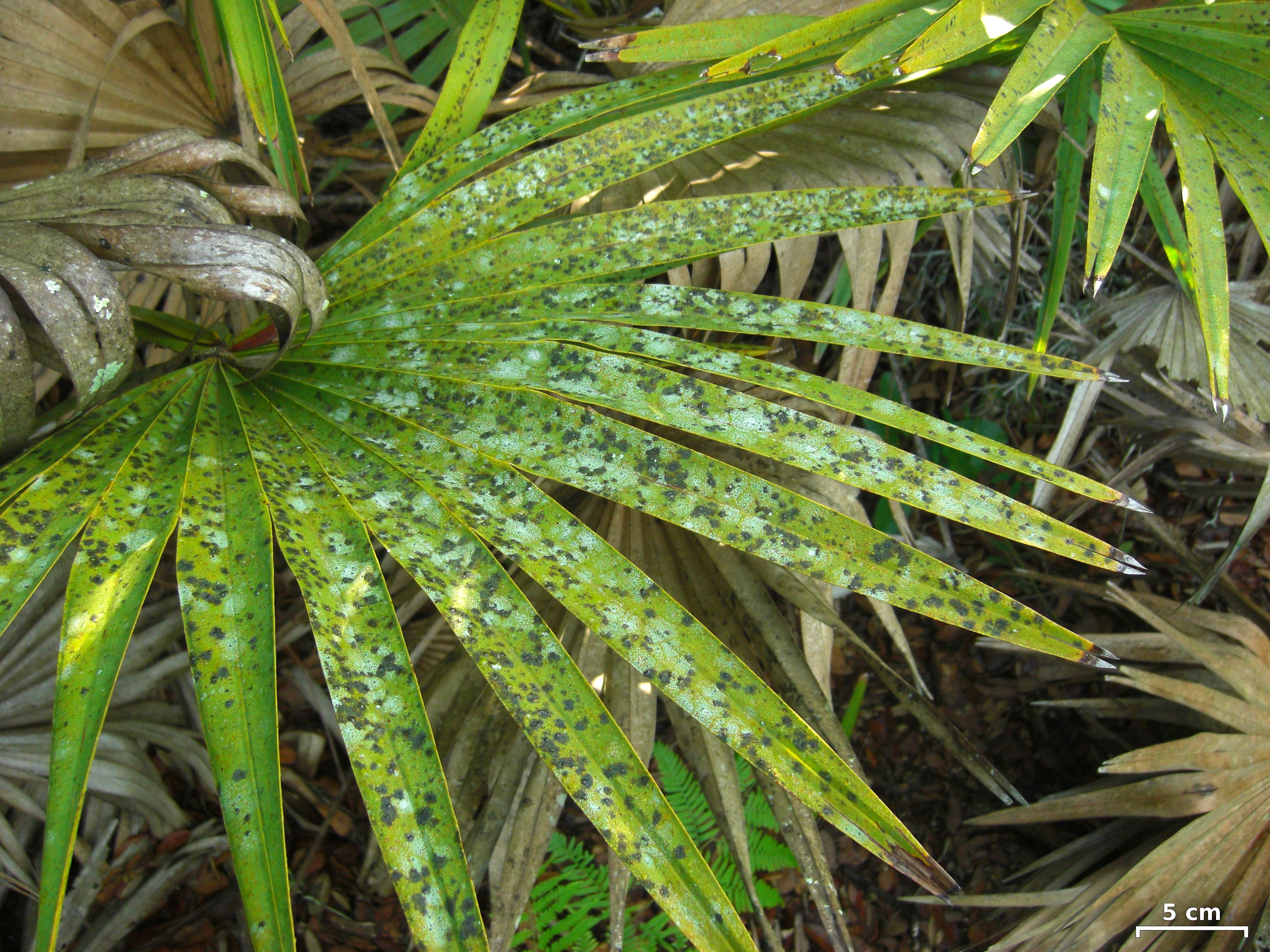
Foliicolous lichens are those which grow on the surface of a plant leaf.

foliicolous lichen
Also epiphyllous lichen. A lichen that grows on a plant leaf.
foliole
A small leaf-like outgrowth from the thallus of a foliose lichen.
foliose
Leaf-like; a type of lichen thallus comprising numerous small leafy lobes, often extending in a roughly circular pattern from a center of growth, on a lower cortex that is attached to the substrate by rhizines or at a base.
forage lichen
Lichens that serve as important food sources for fauna. For example, species from the genera Alectoria, Bryoria, and Cladonia are winter forage lichens for caribou in northern North America.
foveate
Having pits or perforations.
foveolate
Pitted with small, deep depressions that are widely separated by a more or less even thallus. Compare: faveolate, scrobiculate.
friable
Readily crumbled or pulverized.
fruit wart
An informal term for a type of apothecium that has perithecioid (pertusariate or thelotremoid) characteristics.
fruticose
A lichen with a shrub-like or hairy thallus attached to the substrate at a single point.
fruticulose
Also fruticulous . A smaller version of a fruticose lichen. See related: microlichen.
fulvous
A yellow-brown or tawny color.
funiculus
See umbilicate lichen.
funoid
Made of fibers or rope-like strands.
furcate
Forked.
furfuraceous
Covered with small flakes.
fuscocapitate
A term used to describe structures, such as hairs or other appendages, that have a dark or dusky-colored rounded tip or head.
fuscous
A dark, grayish-brown or grayish-black color.
fusiform
Tapered at both ends, like a spindle.
fuzzy coat
The outer gelatinous layer, also known as the g-layer, found on the exterior of an ascus, often exhibiting a gelatinous consistency and staining blue in iodine. Typically present in all asci, the fuzzy coat usually forms a thin layer along the ascus sides but may also appear as an apically thickened cap.

== G ==
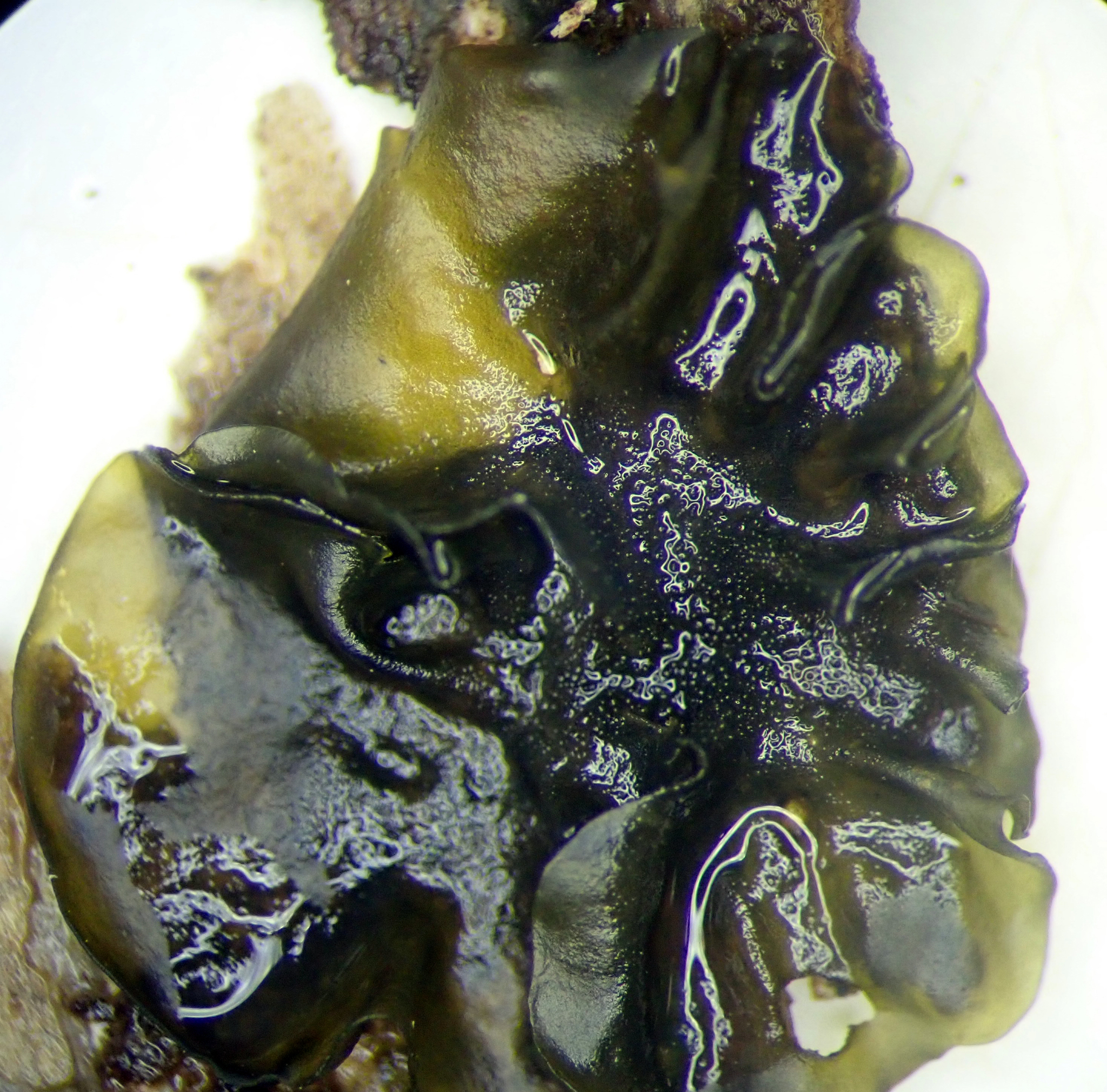
Collema subflaccidum is a gelatinous lichen with a homoiomerous internal structure.

gelatinous lichen
A rubbery or jelly-like lichen with a cyanobacterial photobiont. See related: homoiomerous.
geniculate
Having a knee-like bend; applied to parts of hyphae and conidiophores where a bend forms due to directional changes during growth.
glabrescent
Becoming glabrous.
glabrous
Lacking hair or bristles; smooth.
glaucescentoid
A morphotype of corticolous thelotremoid lichens used to describe characteristics of apothecial and thallus morphology. Glaucescentoid lichens have open apothecia with erect lobules, and a rough thallus containing crystals; this morphotype occurs in the species Leucodecton glaucescens.
glaucophaenoid
A morphotype of corticolous thelotremoid lichens used to describe characteristics of apothecial and thallus morphology. Glaucophaenoid lichens have prominent apothecia with wide pores, pale walls (viewed in microscopic section), and a smooth and more or less shiny thallus; this morphotype occurs in the genus Myriotrema.
gleolichen
Also gloeolichen. A homoiomerous lichen with cyanobacterial cells belonging to the genera Chroococcus, Gloeocapsa, or other Chroococcales; these algae have a mucilaginous capsule.
globose
Also globoid, globular. Approximately spherical.
glomerule
Plural glomerules. Also Latin glomerulus with plural glomeruli. A dense clump or aggregate of cells or spores.

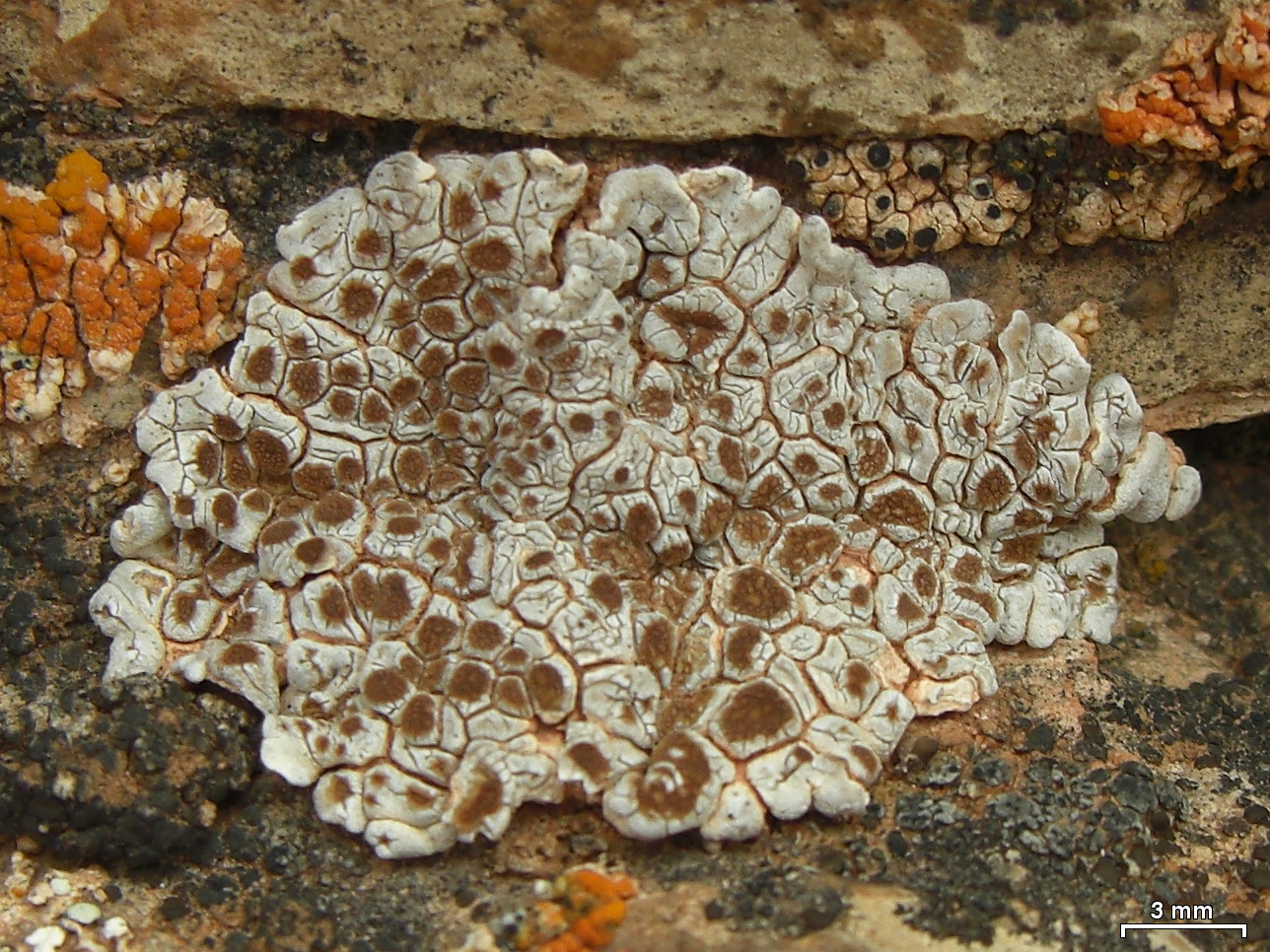
Glypholecia scabra has glypholecideous lirellae

glypholecideous
Also glypholecine. Having especially labyrinth-like lirella, as in the genus Glypholecia.
gonidial layer
A now-obsolete, historical term for the algal layer in a lichen.
gonidium
Plural gonidia. A now-obsolete, historical term for a lichen photobiont. The term was first used by Friedrich Wallroth in 1825, and supplanted in the 1960s.
gonimium
Plural gonimia. A now-obsolete, historical term for a lichen cyanobiont.

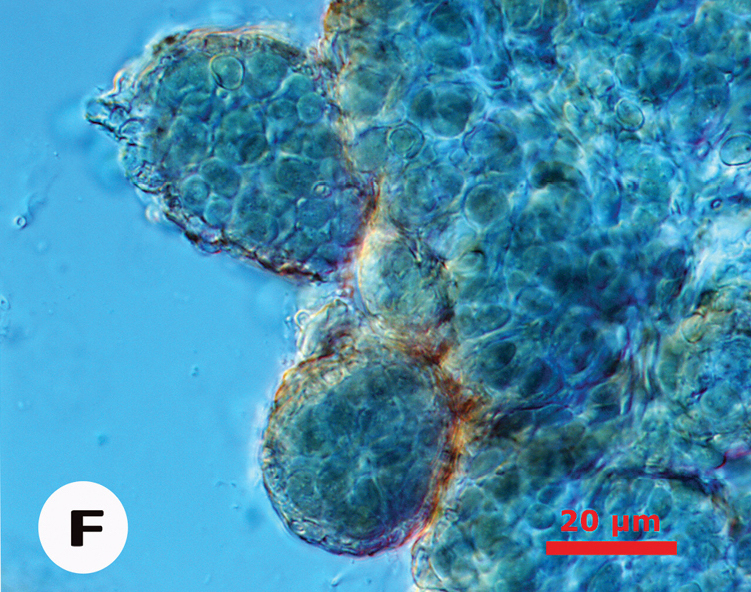
Microscopic view of young goniocysts of Gabura borbonica formed at the lobe margins; scale bar = 20 μm

goniocyst
A vegetative propagule found in some tropical foliicolous lichens that consists of photobiont cells wrapped in mycobiont hyphae; it is similar in form to soredia, but it is made in a special organ called a goniocystangium. The term goniocyst was introduced by Johannes M. Norman in 1872.
goniocystangium
Plural goniocystangia. A special organ, found in some tropical foliicolous lichens, that produces goniocysts.
granular
Also granulate, granulose. Made of small particles (granules).
granule
An irregularly rounded grain-like particle.
graphid
A lichen with apothecia in the form of lirellae, as in the genus Graphis.
growth form
A term for the general appearance (the habit) of a lichen.
grumose
Having a granular or crumbly texture or appearance.
guttulate
Referring to structures containing small oil droplets (guttules); often used to describe spores. More precisely, spores can be described as uni-, bi-, tri-, or multiguttulate.

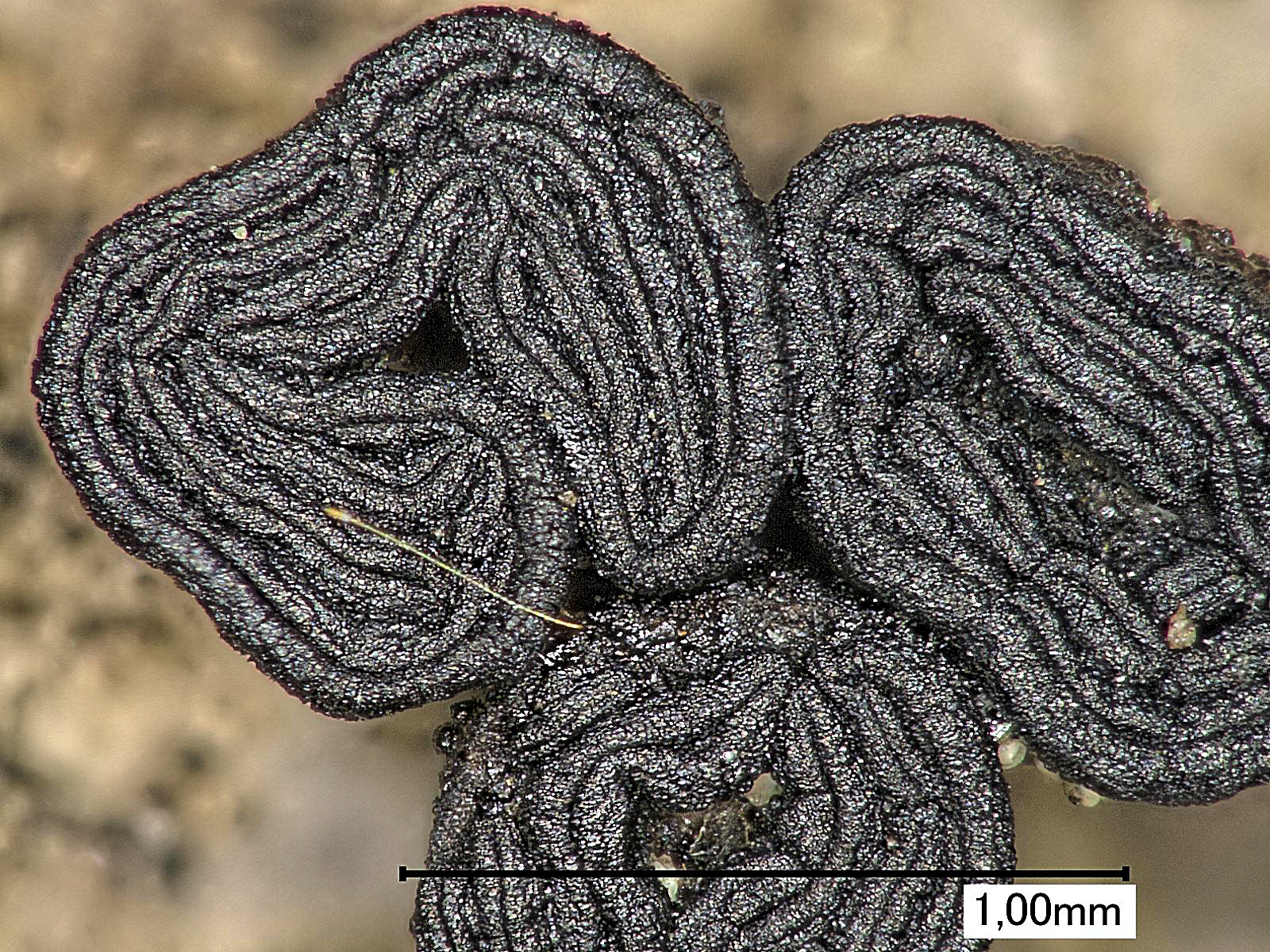
Gyrodiscs of Umbilicaria cylindrica

gyrodisc
An apothecium with concentric circles on the upper surface, as seen in the species Umbilicaria cylindrica. The term was first used by George Llano in 1950.
gyrose
Also gyrate. Curved backward and forward; with folds and undulations.
gyrotremoid
A morphotype of corticolous thelotremoid lichens used to describe characteristics of apothecial and thallus morphology. Gyrotremoid lichens have open apothecia with recurved lobules, a disc that is pigmented with concentric rings, and a smooth, more or less shiny thallus; this morphotype occurs in the genus Gyrotrema.

== H ==
hafter
A flattened attachment point formed through direct contact of a lichen thallus to its substrate; associated with foliose and fruticose lichens that lack other attachment organs, such as Hypogymnia.
halonate
Also defined: halo. Referring to a spore that is surrounded by a transparent outer layer or a gelatinous, translucent sheath. This sheath is readily observed when the spore is stained with India ink, as the ink does not penetrate the mucilage of the sheath, creating a light-transparent halo that is visible against a blackened background.
hamathecium
Also interascal tissue. A term describing the hyphae and tissues that exist between the asci; examples include paraphyses, paraphysoids, pseudoparaphyses, periphysoids, and periphyses.
hapteron
Also hapter, plural haptera. An aerial attachment organ, made of highly adhesive hyphae, that helps secure a thallus to its substrate in some fruticose lichens, such as Cladonia, Ramalina, and Usnea.
hemiamyloid
See dextrinoid.
hepaticolous lichen
See bryophilous lichen.
Hertelii-green
A green to turquoise insoluble lichen pigment, associated with the reference species Biatora hertelii.
hetero-
Also heter-. A prefix meaning "other" or "different".
heterocyst
A specialized type of cell found in some cyanobacteria; heterocysts are thought to be involved in the fixation of nitrogen by the lichen thallus, as well as in the multiplication of cyanobacteria.
heteromerous
A lichen thallus that is organized into discrete layers or strata; the term applies to the majority of foliose, squamulose, and crustose lichens.

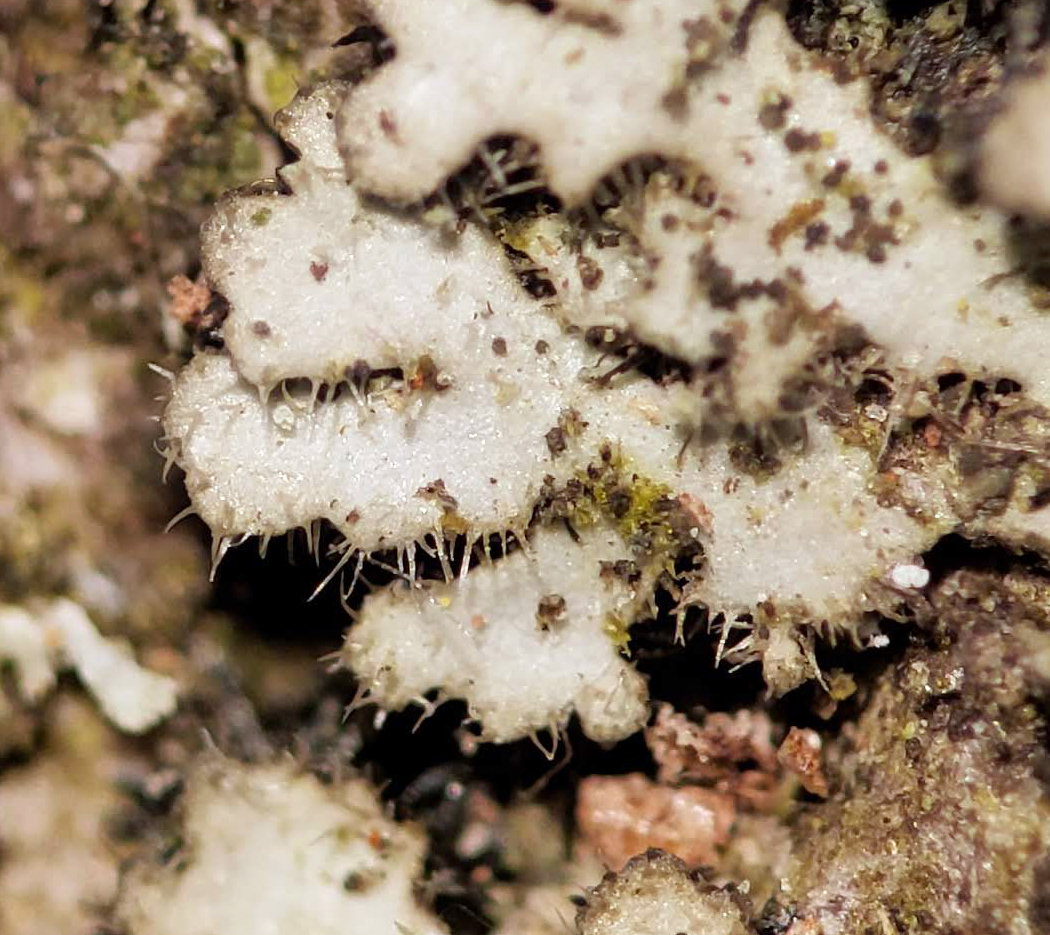
Phaeophyscia hirsuta is named for its hirsute lobe margins.

hirsute
Also hispid, strigose. Covered with hairs.
holdfast
A part of the thallus, usually near the base, that is adapted for attachment to the growing surface.
homo-
A prefix meaning "analogous", "similar", or "same".
homoiomerous
A lichen in which the cyanobiont partner (typically from genus Nostoc) is evenly distributed throughout the thallus; characteristic of gelatinous lichens such as Collema and Leptogium. The term was first used by Friedrich Wallroth in 1825.
hormocyst
Also hormocyte. Also defined: hormocystangium, plural hormocystangia. An asexual propagule, produced in a cup-shaped structure called the hormocystangium, comprising heavy, gelatinous fungal hyphae enclosing a few cyanobiont cells; these structures occur in some gelatinous lichens in the family Collemataceae. Both terms, hormocyst and hormocystangium, were introduced by Gunnar Degelius in 1945. According to one source, hormocyte and hormocytangium (spelled without the "s") are more accurate terms, because the cells (indicated by the ending -cyte) are not sexual propagules (which is implied by the ending -cyst).
hyaline
Transparent and colorless.
hymenium
The fertile tissue of the fruit body where spores are produced.
hypha
Plural hyphae. A microscopic fungus filament comprising one or more cells surrounded by a tubular cell wall.

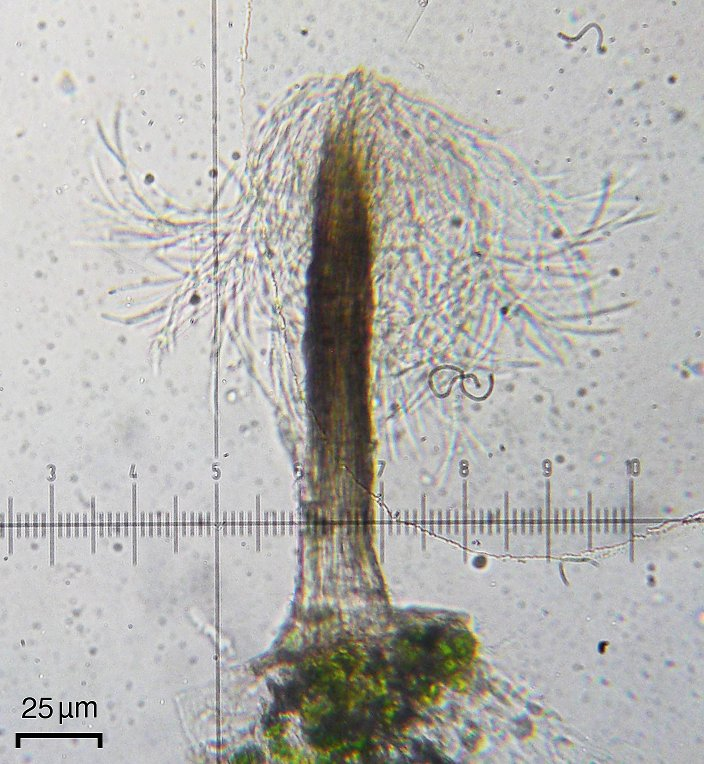
A hyphophore from the foliicolous lichen Tricharia santessonii

hyphophore
An erect, stalked, peltate, asexual spore-producing organ (sporophore) associated with tropical foliicolous lichens.
Hypnorum-blue
A dark blue to black insoluble lichen pigment, associated with the reference species Lecidea hypnorum.
hypo-
Also hyp-. A prefix meaning "beneath" or "under".
hypogymnioid lichen
An informal growth form category used for foliose lichens with lobes that are swollen, inflated, and lacking rhizines, combined with the presence of the substances atranorin in the upper cortex and physodic acid in the medulla. These features are characteristic of lichens in the genera Hypogymnia and Menegazzia.
hyponecral layer
A layer of dead hyphae with indistinct lumina found near the cortex and below the algal layer. See related: epinecral layer.
hypophloeodic
Also hypophloeodal. Refers to crustose lichens whose thalli are almost immersed in tree bark; characteristic of several species in the Thelenellaceae. The term was first used by Friedrich Wallroth in 1825. See related: endophloeodic.
hypothallus
The first hyphae to grow in a crustose lichen; often blackish in color, it is where rhizines originate. The term was first used by Elias Fries in 1831.
hypothecium
Plural hypothecia. A layer of tissue under the subhymenium in an apothecium; also used to refer more generally to all tissues under the hymenium. The term was first used by Carl von Martius in 1828.
hysterothecia
See lirella.

== I ==
I
An abbreviation for a solution of iodine crystals dissolved in aqueous potassium iodide and diluted to a light brown color.
imbricate
Also imbricated. Overlapping partially, like roof tiles; used to refer to lichen structures like scales, squamules, lobules, and lobes.
immaculate
Without spots.
immarginate
See emarginate.
immersed
Embedded or sunken into the surface; in lichens, often used to describe perithecia. A more precise definition has been suggested by Aptroot and Lücking, who propose that the term applies to ascomata and pseudostromata that are more than 3/4 beneath the level of the thallus.
incertae sedis
A term used for a taxon of uncertain, doubtful, or unknown classification.
incised
Having deep, sharp notches or cuts along the edges, often describing the margins of a lichen's thallus or apothecia.
imperforate
Lacking an opening.
inflated
Swollen or blown up, and hollow, like the lobes of genus Hypogymnia.
inspersed
Also defined: inspersion. Also inspers, interspersed. Terms used to describe the presence of minute, scattered oil droplets or granules within a tissue, typically observed in section with a compound microscope. An inspersion refers to the degree of obstruction caused by the sprinkling of small particles within different sections of a given structure.
involute
Turned inward.
Intrusa-yellow
A yellow insoluble lichen pigment, associated with the reference species Carbonea intrusa.
involucrellum
Plural involucrella. The tissue of the outer part of a perithecium, often pigmented, surrounding the exciple.

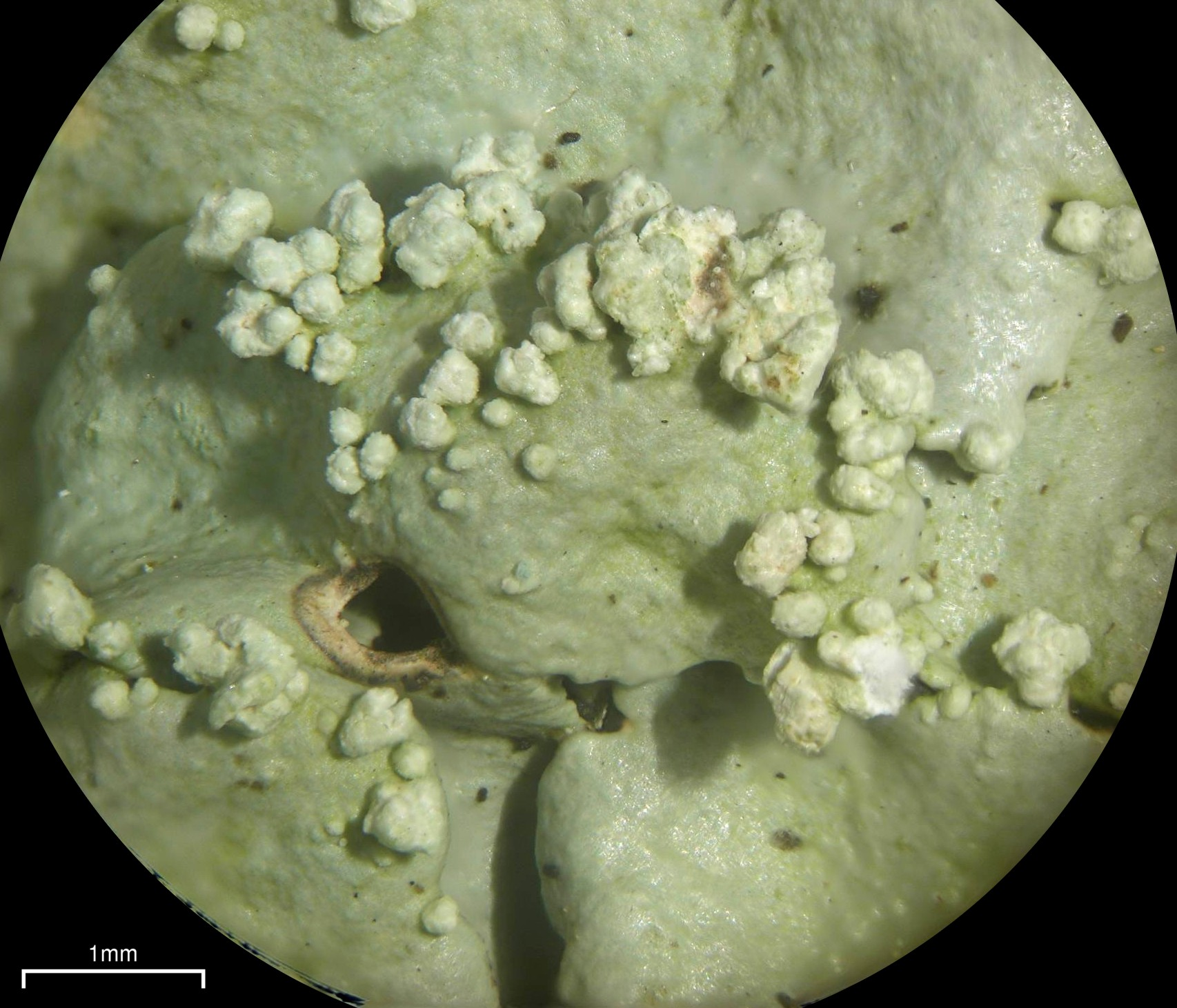
Closeup of the pustulate isidia that are characteristic of Flavoparmelia baltimorensis; scale bar = 1 mm

isidiate
Having isidia.
isidiomorph
A structure that resembles an isidium, but is formed as an outgrowth of the medulla rather than the cortex; associated with soralia of species in the genus Usnea.
isidiotremoid
A morphotype of corticolous thelotremoid lichens used to describe characteristics of apothecial and thallus morphology. Isidiotremoid lichens lack apothecia and have isidia, and a smooth, more or less shiny thallus; this morphotype occurs in the genera Myriotrema and Ocellularia.
isidium
Plural isidia. A propagule that is an outgrowth of the thallus; it has a cortex and contains photobiont cells. The term was first used in the sense it is used now by Georg Meyer in 1825, and adopted by Elias Fries in 1831.
isodiametric
Having roughly equal dimensions in all directions, resulting in a roughly spherical or cube-like shape; often used to describe cells that are not elongated or flattened but maintain a uniform size across their width, height, and depth.
isotomic
Having branches of equal length.
isthmus
Plural isthmuses or isthmi. The narrow middle portion between the two locules of a polarilocular spore.

== J ==
juga
Plural jugae. A tiny carbonized structure made of hyphal tissue, visible as a black dot, line, or ridge, on or in a thallus; associated with the genus Verrucaria.

== K ==
K test
A spot test that uses a 10–25% solution of potassium hydroxide as a reagent to check for the presence of certain lichen products.
KC test
A spot test performed with an application of K followed immediately by C.

== L ==
labriform
Shaped like or resembling a lip.
lacinia
Plural laciniae. A narrow lobe of a foliose lichen thallus.
laciniate
Also laciniated. Referring to an edge divided into delicate bands or narrow lobes.
lactophenol cotton blue
Also LCB. A histological stain commonly used to prepare semi-permanent slides. With this reagent, fungal hyphae stain blue, and algal cells stain deep blue to blue-green.
lacunose
Also lacunar, lacunous. A texture that appears pitted or containing gaps or holes, giving it a somewhat rough or uneven appearance.
lageniform
Flask-shaped; with a swollen base tapering to a narrow top.
lamella
Plural lamellae. In the genus Umbilicaria, lamellae are flattened plate- or strap-like structures that project downward from the thallus undersurface.
lamelloid
A morphotype of corticolous thelotremoid lichens used to describe characteristics of apothecial and thallus structure. In this, apothecia are noticeably protruding and organized into several distinct, concentric rows of lobulate excipula. This morphotype is seen in species like Chapsa lamellifera.
laminal
All over the thallus surface, rather than in the center or on the margins. Contrast: marginal.
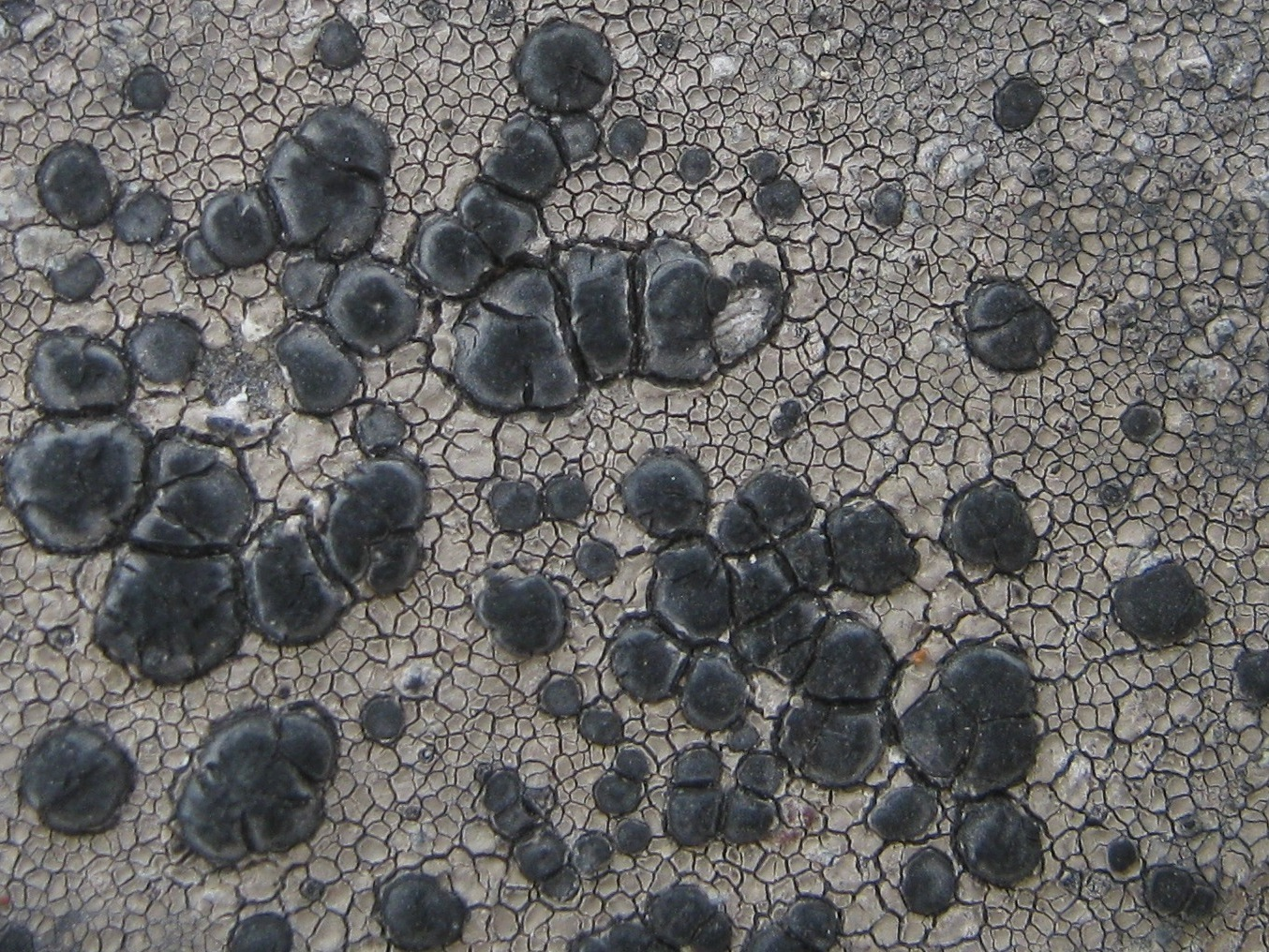
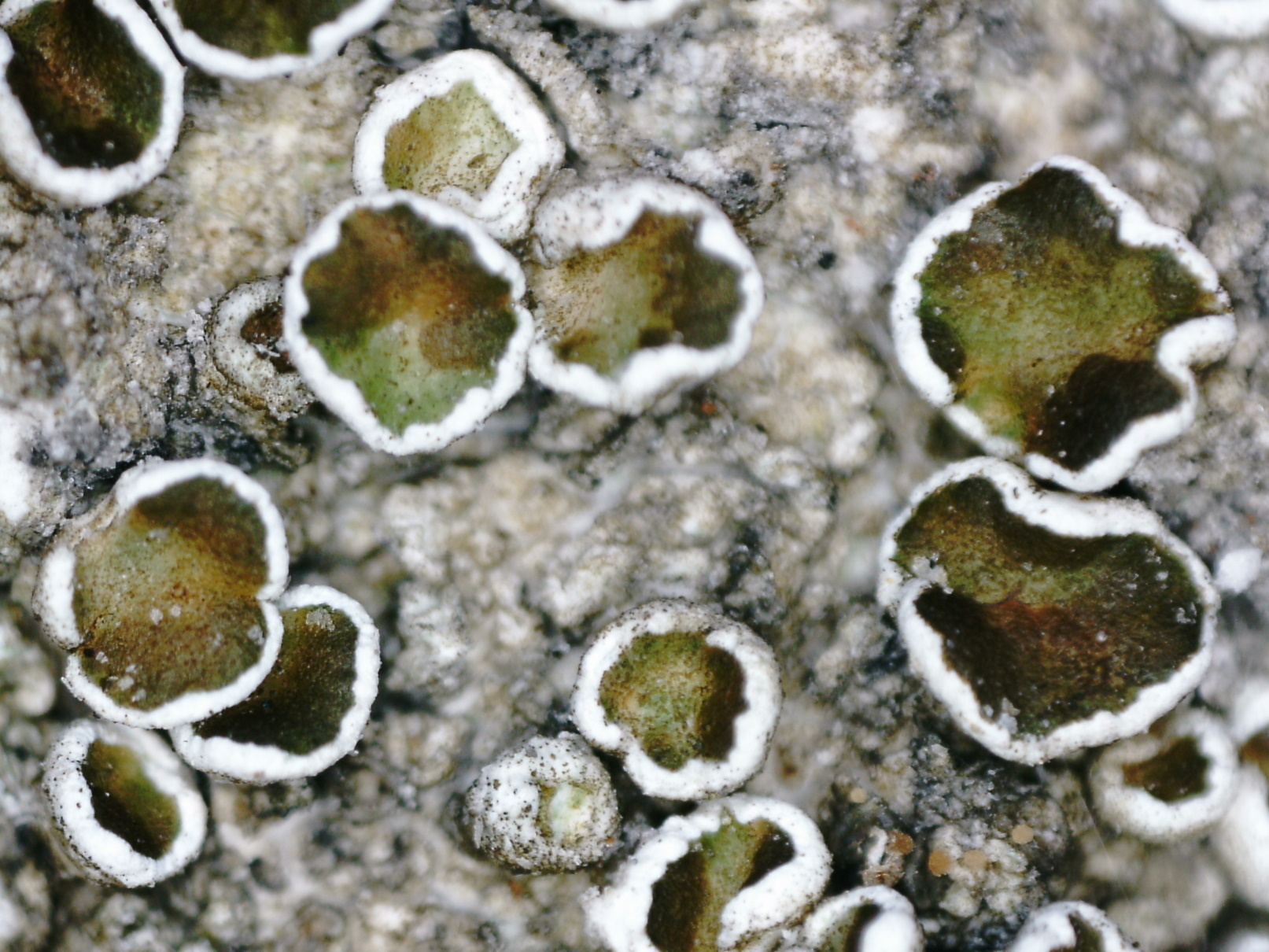
Comparison of the lecideine apothecia of Lecidea fuscoatra (left) and the lecanorine apothecia of Lecanora allophana (right)

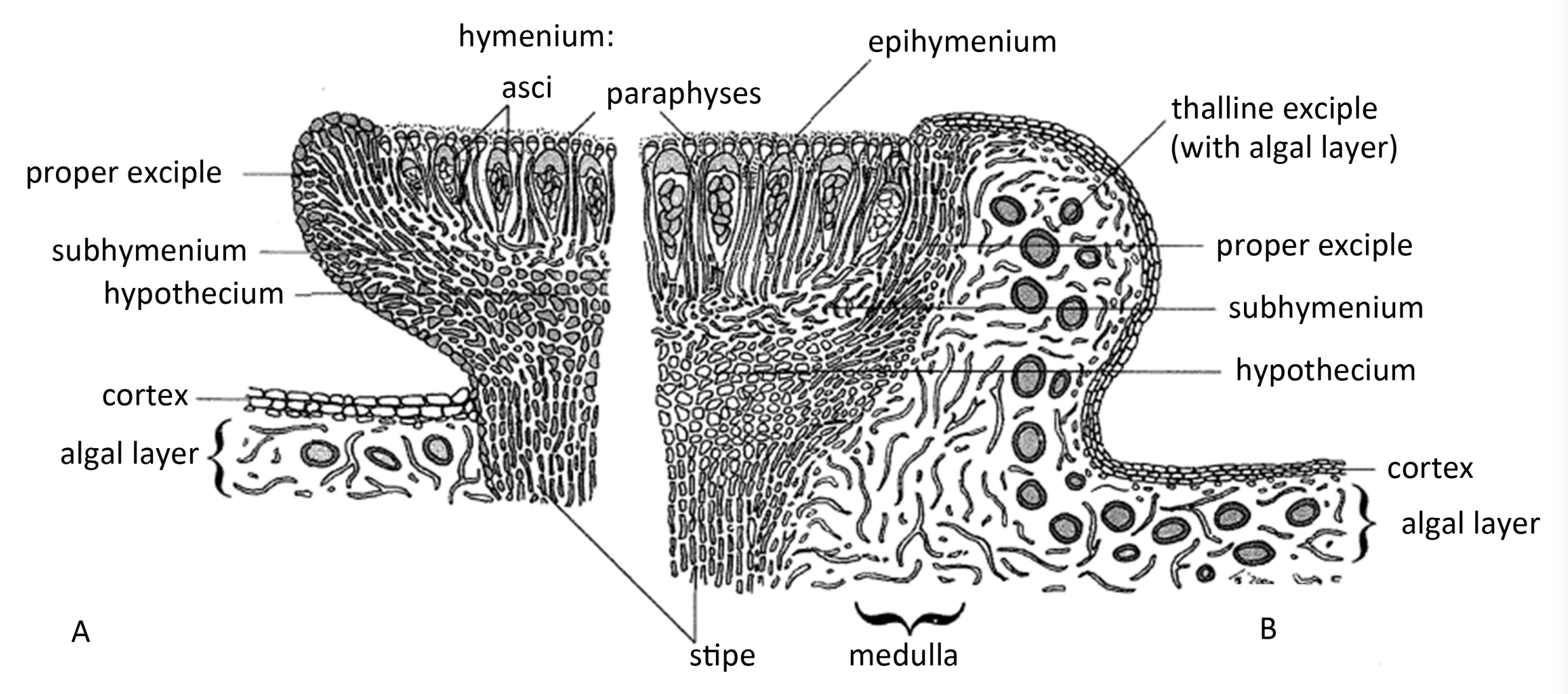
Diagrammatic representation and comparison of cross sections of lecideine (left) and lecanorine (right) apothecia

Laurocerasi-brown
A reddish- or purplish-brown insoluble lichen pigment, associated with the reference species Bacidia laurocerasi.
lax
Loose, loosely woven, not compact; like the hyphae in the medulla.
lecanorine
Also lecanoroid. An apothecium in which the disk is surrounded by a pale thalline margin, which has both algal and fungal cells, as in the genus Lecanora. The term is also used more generally to refer to crustose lichens of the order Lecanorales that have rounded apothecia with thick, protruding margins.
lecideine
Also lecideoid. An apothecium in which the disk lacks a thalline margin, as in the genus Lecidea. The term is also used more generally to refer to apothecia with a blackened (carbonaeous) ring and a blackish disk.
leiodisk
Also leiodisc. A disk of an apothecium that is smooth and without folds or protrusions. The term was introduced by George Llano in 1950.
lepadinoid
A morphotype of corticolous thelotremoid lichens used to describe characteristics of apothecial and thallus structure. This morphotype describes lichens where apothecia are semi-embedded to prominently protruding and have a free excipulum and a distinctive double margin. The thalline margin bulges and remains whole, while the excipulum is prominent and wavy-lobed. Fibrillithecis halei, Leucodecton occultum, Myriotrema costaricense, and Thelotrema are examples of this morphotype.
leprocarpoid
A morphotype of corticolous thelotremoid lichens used to describe characteristics of apothecial and thallus morphology. Leprocarpoid lichens have open apothecia with erect lobules and a mealy and more or less matte thallus; this morphotype occurs in the genus Chapsa.

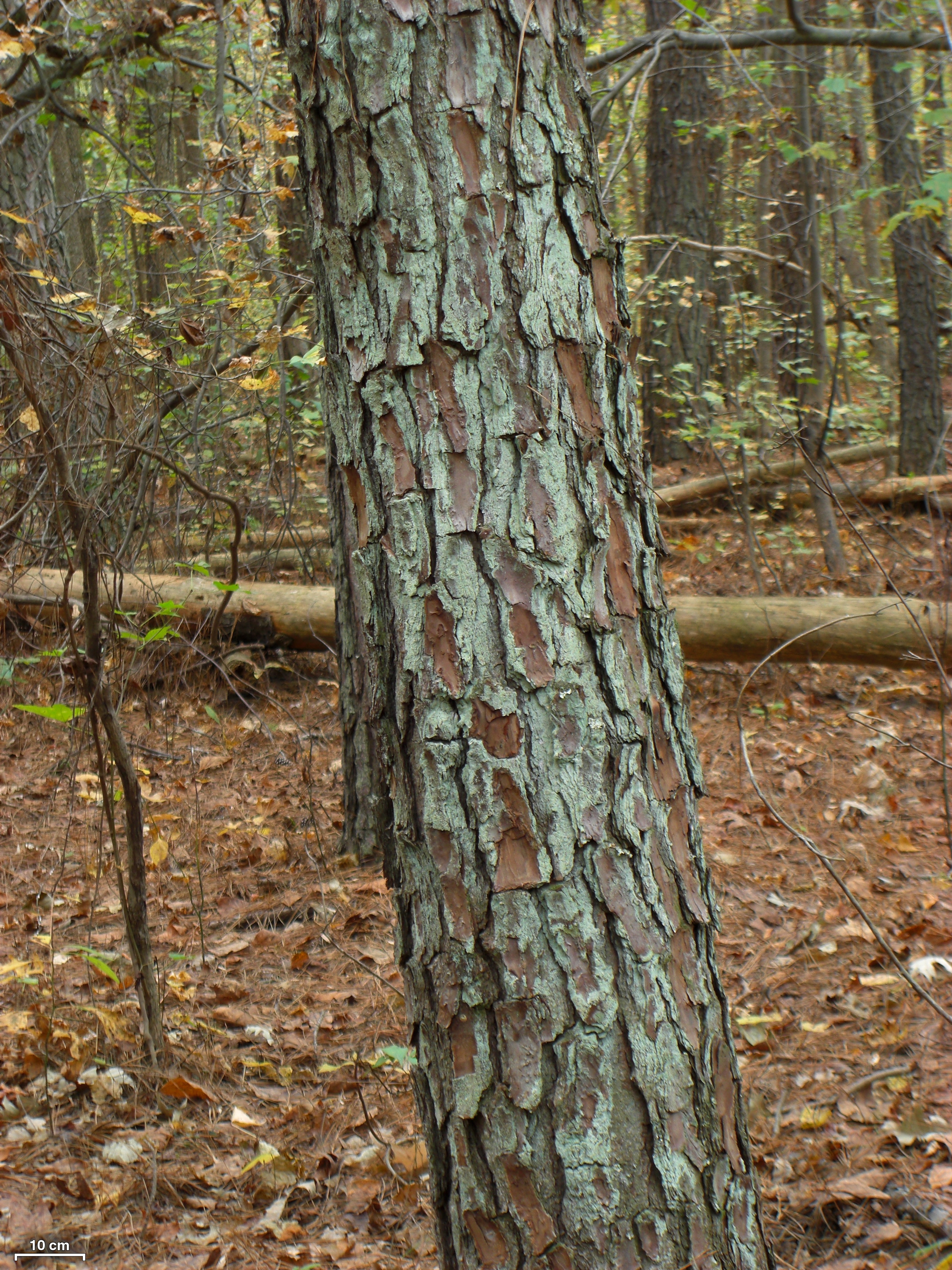
The corticolous species Lepraria harrisiana, seen here as greenish powder on the tree trunk, is an example of a leprose lichen with an effuse and emarginate thallus.

leprose lichen
A lichen made entirely of granular soredia, lacking a cortex.
Leptocline-brown
A dark red-brown insoluble lichen pigment, associated with the reference species Buellia leptocline.
Leptoclinoides-brown
A brown insoluble lichen pigment, associated with the reference species Hafellia leptoclinoides.
leptotremoid
A morphotype of corticolous thelotremoid lichens used to describe characteristics of apothecial and thallus morphology. Leptotremoid lichens have immersed apothecia with small pores, and a rough thallus containing crystals; this morphotype occurs in the genus Leptotrema.
leucodectonoid
A morphotype of corticolous thelotremoid lichens used to describe characteristics of apothecial and thallus morphology. Leucodectonoid lichens have closed apothecia with tiny pores, and a rough thallus containing crystals; this morphotype occurs in the genus Leucodecton.
lichen desert
A zone around a city or air pollution source that is devoid of foliose and fruticose lichens.
Lichenes
The name of a historical class that contained all of the lichen-forming fungi. This name was used when it was still erroneously believed that these fungi were quite separate from the non lichen-forming fungi; now obsolete.
lichenicolous lichen
A lichen that grows on another lichen.
lichenin
Also lichenan. A polymer of glucose that occurs in the cell walls of the hyphae of many species of lichen-forming fungi. It forms a red color when stained with iodine.
lichenometry
A dating technique that measures crustose lichen growth to estimate the amount of time a rock surface has been exposed.
lignicolous lichen
A lichen that grows on stripped wood (lignin) – that is, on bare wood rather than bark.
ligulate
Also liguliform, lingulate, lorate. Narrow and flat, with the form of a strap.

Closeup of the lirellae of Graphis desquamescens; scale bar = 0.5 mm

lirella
Plural lirellae. Also hysterothecia, lirelline apothecia. A linear ascocarp, which may be straight, curved, branched, or flexuous, with a longitudinal slit; characteristic of lichens in the genus Graphis. The term was first proposed by Michel Adanson in 1794.
lirellate
Also lirelliform. Having the form of lirellae.
litho-
A prefix meaning "stone" or "rock".
lithocortex
Cortex tissue made of closely compacted, agglutinated hyphae that forms a dense tissue layer.
lobarioid lichen
An informal growth form category used for lichens previously separated in the family Lobariaceae and now classified as subfamily Lobarioideae within the Peltigeraceae.
lobate
Divided into lobes, such as the thallus of Lobaria scrobiculata.
lobe
A rounded or elongated projection of a thallus edge; in technical descriptions, it is measured from its widest point.
lobule
A small lobe originating from the edge or surface of a foliose lichen, typically the same color and character as the thallus.
lobulate
Having small lobes.
locule
Also loculus. A cavity or space.
lorate
See ligulate.
lumen
Plural lumina or lumens. An internal space or cavity in a structure, such as a cell, hypha, or septate spore.

== M ==
macrolichen
A lichen with a thallus large enough that its main characteristics can be identified without the use of viewing magnification; generally refers to foliose, squamulose, and fruticose species.
maculate
Covered with spots (maculae).
maniciform
Cuff-shaped; the term is used to describe soralia that break open to form a central perforation revealing a duct to the medullary cavity. Maniciform soralia occur in the genera Hypogymnia and Menegazzia.
marginal
On the thallus margins. Contrast: laminal.

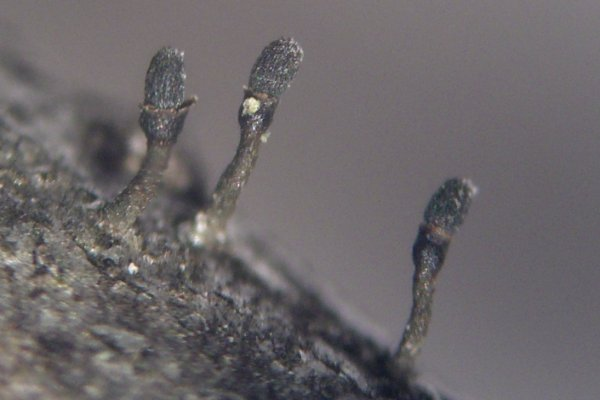
The mazaediate ascomata of the shrub stubble lichen (Allocalicium adaequatum) rest atop short stalks.

marginate
Having a well-defined border or edge. Contrast: emarginate.
matte
Also: matt. A flat or non-reflective surface texture, lacking gloss or shine; contrast nitid.
mazaedium
Plural mazaedia. A powdery mass of ascospores and paraphyses formed by the disintegration of the asci in the ascomata of some lichens; associated with the order Caliciales. The term was first used by Erik Acharius in 1817.
medulla
The internal tissue of a lichen thallus, located beneath the cortex and the photobiont layer, and usually made of loosely compacted hyphae.
medullary excipulum
See proper exciple.
Melaena-red
A purple insoluble lichen pigment, associated with the reference species Micarea melaena.
Melaenida-red
A purple insoluble lichen pigment, associated with the reference species Micarea melaenida.
melanotopelioid
A morphotype of corticolous thelotremoid lichens describing a type of apothecium structure resembling topeliopsidoid apothecia but characterized by a minimized thallus margin. The distinctive feature of melanotopelioid apothecia is the presence of "teeth" that are black and carbonized, at least on the external surface.
melanotremoid
A morphotype of corticolous thelotremoid lichens used to describe characteristics of apothecial and thallus morphology. Melanotremoid lichens have prominent apothecia with wide pores and a black margin; pore filled with broad "stump" (columella); black walls (viewed in microscopic section); and a smooth, more or less shiny thallus. This morphotype occurs in the genera Melanotrema, Ocellularia, Clandestinotrema, and Trinathotrema.
micareoid
Referring to small chlorococcoid green algal photobionts that often occur in pairs, as in the genus Micarea.
microcrystallization
Also microcrystal test. A method used to identify some lichen products that involves re-crystallization on a microscope slide from a range of solvents and the formation of crystals with characteristic shapes; the crystals are examined microscopically for identification. Although this technique has largely been supplanted by the more reliable and sensitive technique of thin-layer chromatography, there are certain situations where it is still useful.
microlichen
A small lichen whose physical features cannot be distinguished without the aid of a 10X or greater viewing magnification; it generally refers to crustose and foliicolous species. The prefix "micro-" is also used to indicate small versions of particular growth forms, e.g. microfruticose or microfoliose.
microphylline
Having minute lobules.
moniliform
Also monilioid. Having a form resembling a string of beads.
monophyllous
Referring to the thallus of a foliose lichen that has only a single lobe.
multi-
A prefix meaning "more than one" or "many".
multiguttulate
Containing many oil droplets (guttules).
multilocular
See plurilocular.

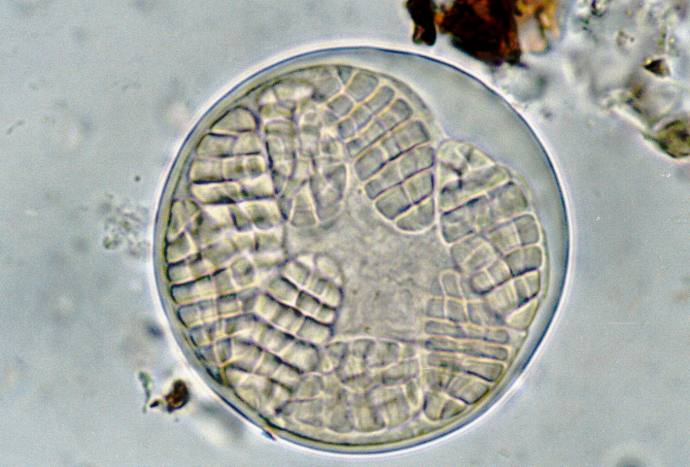
A balloon-shaped ascus of Arthothelium spectabile containing eight hyaline, muriform ascospores.

muriform
Divided into compartments or locules by intersecting longitudinal and transverse septa. The term was first used by Wilhelm Körber in 1855.
muscicolous lichen
See bryophilous lichen.
-mycetes
A suffix indicating the taxonomic rank of a fungal class.
mycobiont
The fungal part of a lichen, which combines with one or more phycobionts. The term was proposed by George Scott in 1957.
mycophycobiosis
Also defined: mycophycobiont. A symbiosis where an ascomycete fungus is housed inside multicellular algae; the algae and fungus involved in this association are called mycophycobionts. Contrary to a lichen symbiosis, the fungal partner is the inhabitant, and the algal partner dominates.
myriotremoid
A morphotype of corticolous thelotremoid lichens used to describe characteristics of apothecial and thallus morphology. Myriotremoid lichens have immersed apothecia with small pores, and a smooth and more or less shiny thallus; this morphotype occurs in the glaucopallens group of genus Myriotrema.

== N ==
necral layer
A layer of dead hyphae with indistinct lumina found near or in the cortex of a thallus. The term was first used by Alexander Elenkin in 1902. See related: epinecral layer, hyponecral layer.
nitid
Shiny, glossy, or polished in appearance; contrast with matte.
nodulose
Having small, rounded elevations or nodules.
nubilated
Cloudy or obscured, often used to describe the appearance of lichen apothecia that are partially covered.

== O ==
ob-
A prefix meaning "inversely" or "oppositely".
obclavate
Inversely clavate, widest at the base.
obovate
Also obovoid. Egg-shaped, with the narrower end at the base.
obpyriform
Shaped like an inverted pear. See related: pyriform.
ocellularioid
A morphotype of corticolous thelotremoid lichens used to describe characteristics of apothecial and thallus morphology. Ocellularioid lichens have prominent apothecia with wide pores; pores with a "finger" (columella); black walls (viewed in microscopic section); and a smooth, more or less shiny thallus. This morphotype occurs in the genus Ocellularia.
-oid
A suffix meaning "like" or "having the form of".

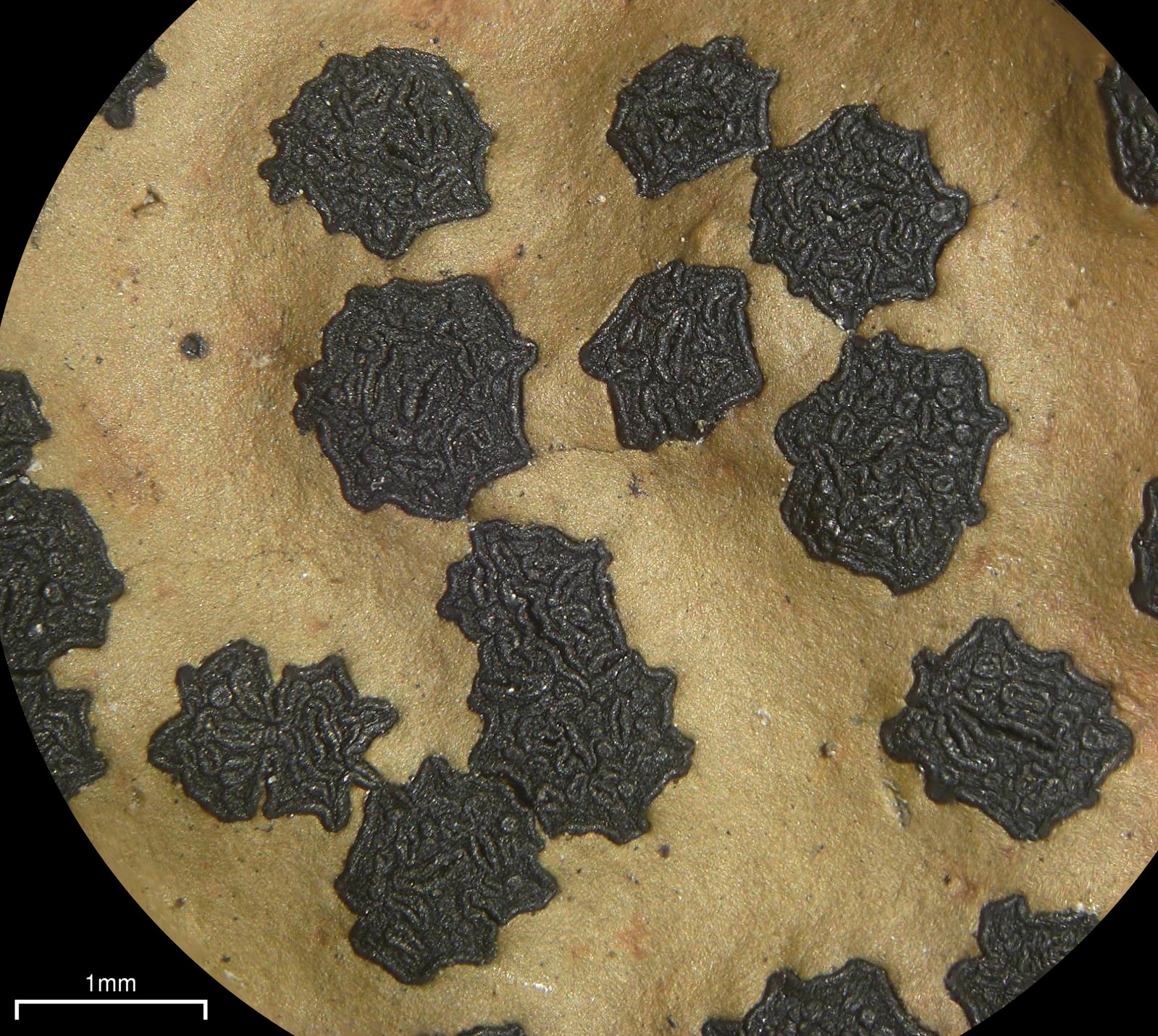
The omphalodiscs of Umbilicaria phaea

omphalodisc
An apothecial disk with a bump in the center that gives it the appearance of a navel; found in the genus Umbilicaria. The term was introduced by George Llano in 1950.
orcularioid
A brown, polarilocular spore, characteristic of Rinodina section Orcularia.
ornithocoprophilic
Used to describe lichens that grow or proliferate in environments rich in bird excrement.
ostiole
A small pore or opening; in lichens, it is used to refer to the paraphysis-lined cavity in a parathecium that ends in a pore, or more generally to any pore from which spores are released from an ascus-bearing fruit body.
ostropalean
Referring to asci that are unitunicate with a thickened apex and a narrow canal ending in a pore; associated with species in the order Ostropales.
ovate
Egg-shaped, with the wider end at the base.

== P ==
pachydermatous
Also pachyderm, pachydermate, pachydermous. Referring to hyphae that have an outer wall that is thicker than the internal cavity.
palisade cell
A terminal cell of a hypha in a fastigiate cortex, aligned perpendicularly to the plane of the thallus.
palisade plectenchyma
Plural palisade plectenchymata. Also palisadoplectenchyma, plural palisadoplectenchymata. A type of plectenchyma in a cortex where the hyphae are arranged perpendicularly to the plane of the thallus.
pallidostegoboloid
A morphotype of corticolous thelotremoid lichens used to describe characteristics of apothecial and thallus morphology. Pallidostegoboloid lichens have prominent apothecia with wide pores; pore filled with irregular structures; pale walls (viewed in microscopic section); and a smooth, more or less shiny thallus. This morphotype occurs in wrightii group of the genus Stegobolus.

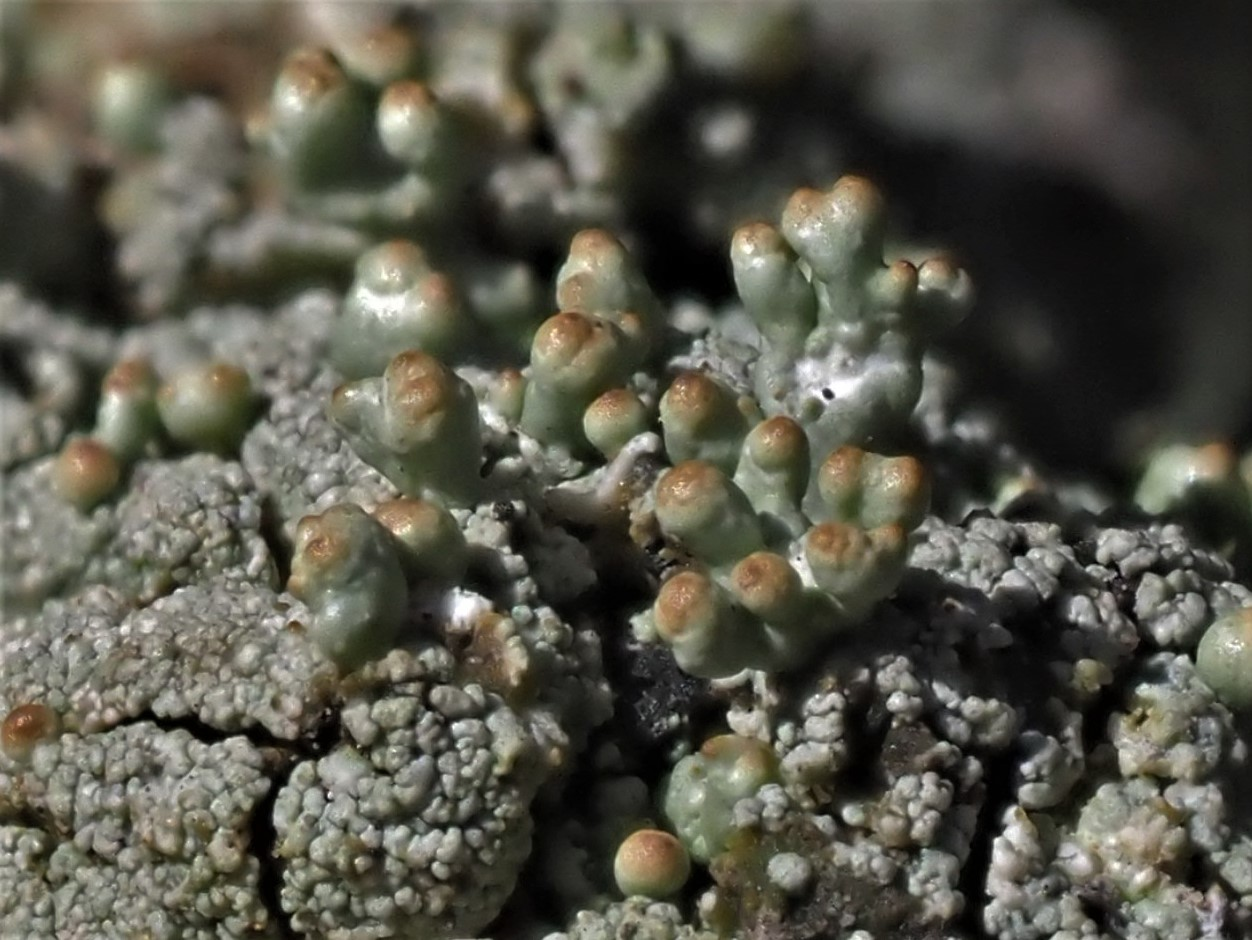
The thallus of Pycnothelia papillaria is covered with papillae.

papilla
Plural papillae. A small, conically rounded growth.
papillate
Also papillose. Covered with papillae.
papilliform
Having the shape of a papilla or nipple.
para-
Also par-. A prefix with several meanings, including "above", "beyond", "at the side", "against", "toward", and "almost".
paracephalodium
Plural paracephalodia. A mat of hyphae covering cyanobacteria, originating from a squamulose lichen with a green algal photobiont. The term was introduced by Josef Poelt and Helmut Mayrhofer in 1988.
paraphysis
A sterile, thread-like filament that that is attached at its base and grows vertically among the asci within a lichen's fruiting body (ascomata). These structures typically have slightly swollen tips and may be branched or unbranched, often containing pigments that contribute to the color of the fruiting body's disk.
paraphysoid
A threadlike, sterile, hyphal structure similar to a paraphysis, but typically branched and often forming a network.
paraplectenchyma
Plural paraplectenchymata. A type of plectenchyma comprising hyphae that are oriented in all directions; found in the cortex of many lichens.
parasoredium
A propagule, similar to a soredium, that starts as a budlike structure with hyphae on an upper side and algae on a lower side, then develops into blastidia. Originally used to describe a structure found on the upper thallus of Umbilicaria hirsuta.
parasymbiont
An organism that lives in close association with a host species, deriving benefits at the host's expense but not causing immediate harm; an intermediate state between symbiosis and parasitism.
parathecium
Plural parathecia. The outside layer of hyphae in an apothecium, curved upward along the margin of the hymenium; the term is now obsolete, and equivalent to ectal excipulum or proper exciple. Otto Darbishire coined the term parathecium in an 1898 monograph on the genus Roccella.
parmelioid lichen
An informal growth form category used for lichens that are mostly foliose, often closely attached to the substrate, and have laminal apothecia and pycnidia; this group of features is characteristic of lichens previously classified in the genus Parmelia (in the broad sense).
PD test
Also P test. A spot test that uses a 1–5% ethanolic solution of p-phenylenediamine as a reagent to check for the presence of certain lichen products.
pedicel
A small stalk used to support other structures, such as spores, asci, etc.
pedicellate
Having a pedicel.
peltate
Also clypeate, scutiform. Referring to a rounded structure attached on the lower side at a single central point (often on a short stalk), with free edges.
peltidiangium
A basket-like structure in which peltidia are produced.
peltidium
A reproductive propagule found in the foliicolous lichen genus Gallaicolichen that is similar in form to a goniocystangium, but is unique in that the photobiont partner organizes the propagule and envelops (or nearly so) its mycobiont partner. The term is derived from the name of the involved green algal genus, Phycopeltis.
pendant
Also pendent, pendulous. Hanging down, as in the fruticose thalli of genus Usnea, the beard lichens.

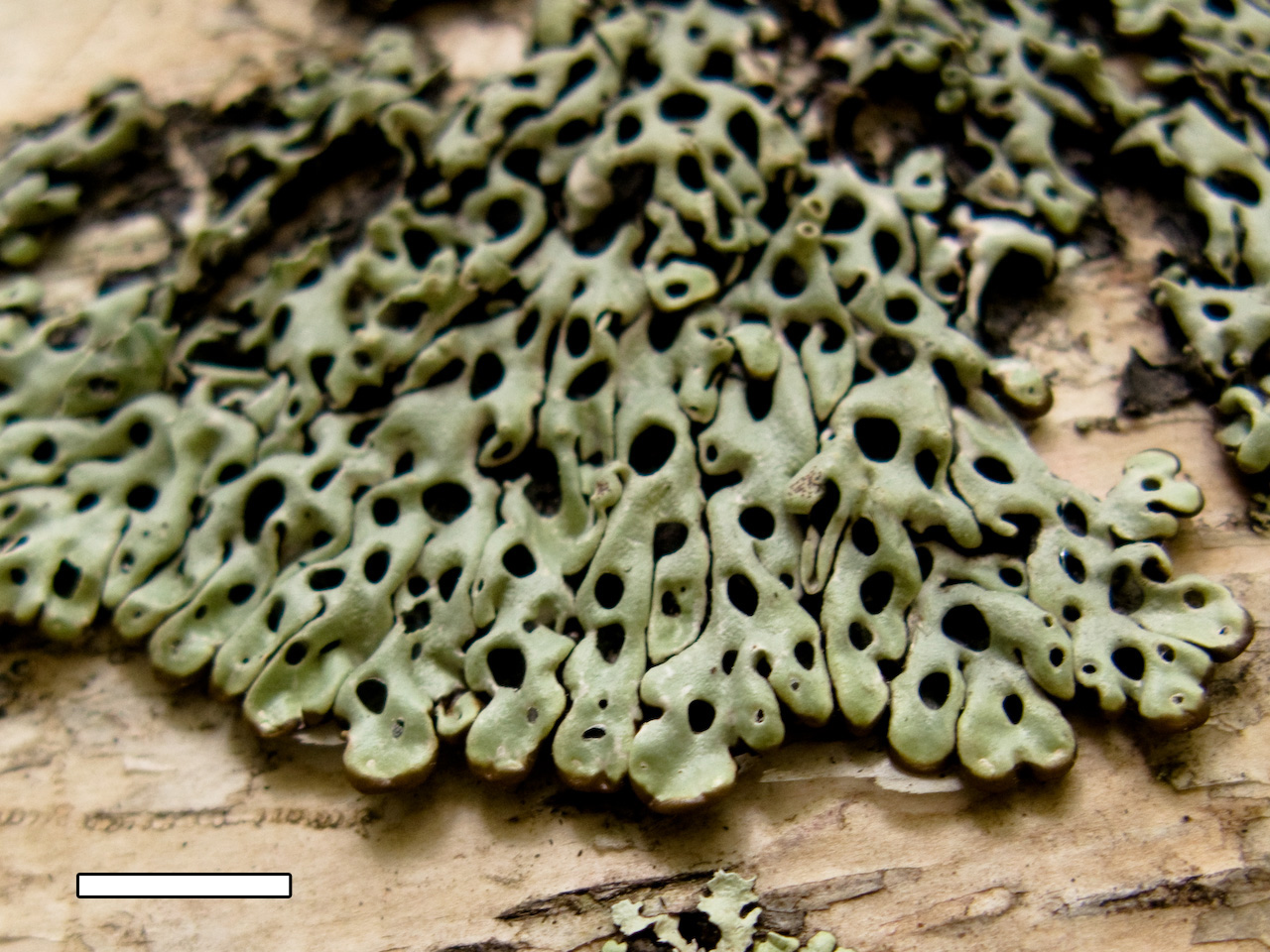
A perforate thallus is a character of the hypogymnioid genus Menegazzia (M. pertransita shown)

perforate
With splits or holes in the thallus.
periclinal
Parallel to a surface; used to refer to hyphal alignment.
perifulcrum
The protective wall surrounding a pycnidium.
periphysis
Plural periphyses. A short, sterile hypha that develops from above the ascus and grows down a short distance, typically lining the internal walls of the ostiole in a perithecium.
periphysoid
Periphysis-like structures that grow laterally; found in some crustose pyrenolichens.
perispore
Also defined: exospore, epispore, mesospore, endospore. The colorless and usually gelatinous outermost layer of a spore. This transparent layer determines the spore's shape. The other four layers of a spore, going inward, are the exospore, epispore, mesospore, and endospore.

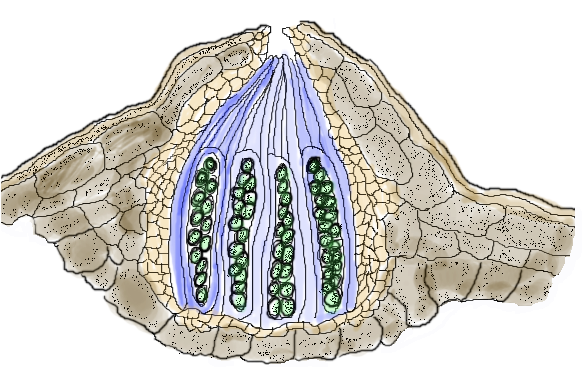
Schematic illustration of a perithecium with an apical ostiole

perithecium
Plural perithecia. A spherical or flask-shaped ascocarp that is sessile or partly immersed in the thallus, with a single opening (ostiole) and enclosed by a distinct wall; a characteristic of pyrenolichens. Although it was in 1831 that Elias Fries first applied the term perithecium to lichen fruit bodies, the word was originally coined by Christiaan Hendrik Persoon in 1794.
petricolous
See epilithic.
phaeolichen
A lichen in which the photobiont partner is brown algae (class Phaeophyceae); an example is lichen formed by the fungus Wahlenbergiella tavaresiae and the brown alga Petroderma maculiforme.
phenocortex
Plural phenocortices, phenocortexes. A structure, similar to a cortex, containing hyphal fragments and dead, collapsed algal cells sloughed off from the algal layer.
photobiont
Also defined: phycobiont, cyanobiont. The photosynthetic component of a lichen. This can be either a green alga (known as a phycobiont) or a cyanobacteria (known as a cyanobiont). The term "phycobiont" was proposed by George Scott in 1957.
photobiont layer
See algal layer.
photomorph
An organism whose morphology is determined by the nature of its photosynthesis; applied to lichen-forming fungi whose thalli have different forms with green algal versus cyanobacterial photobionts. The term was introduced by Jack Laundon in 1995 to address what he believed were deficiencies in related terms such as morph, morphotype, and photosymbiodeme.
photosymbiodeme
Morphologically different structures formed by the interaction of a single mycobiont with two different photobionts. Examples occur in the genera Pseudocyphellaria and Sticta.
phycobiont
See: photobiont
phycolichen
A historical lichenological term with multiple meanings. Originally introduced by Fries (1831) as "Phyco-Lichenes" for lichens morphologically resembling seaweeds. Later redefined by Massalongo (1855) for homoiomerous cyanobacterial lichens, then by Diels (1936) for lichens with Phycomycetes as their fungal partner. More recently proposed but discouraged as a term for green algal lichens, with "chlorolichen" recommended instead as a counterpart to "cyanolichen". Generally considered obsolete in modern lichenology due to its ambiguous history.
phyllidium
Plural phyllidia. A small leaf-like or scale-like propagule that is corticate and has distinct upper and lower sides (i.e., it is dorsiventral); it originates from the margins or on the upper surface of thallus. Phyllidia occur in some species of the Lecanorales and the Peltigerales.

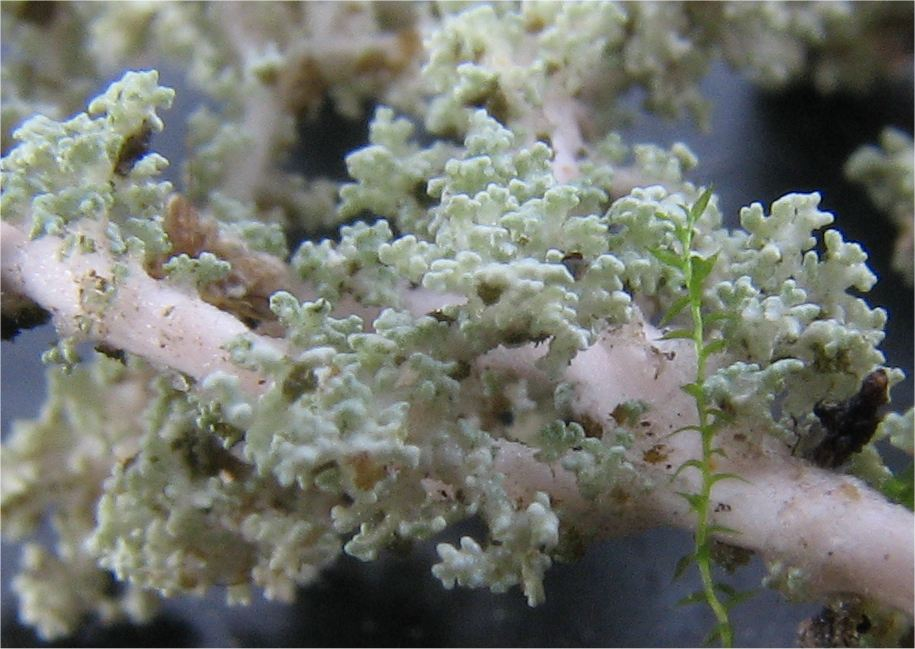
A closeup of Stereocaulon paschale shows that its phyllocladia have a granular or dactyliform shape, and are gathered in clusters along branches of the pseudopodetia.

phyllocladium
Plural phyllocladia. A photobiont-containing, corticate outgrowth of pseudopodetia; common in the genus Stereocaulon. Their morphology can be characterised with various descriptors: coralloid, digitate, granular, peltate, foliose, squamulose, and verrucose. The term was introduced by Theodor Fries in 1858.
phyllopsoroid
A lichen growth form characterized by mostly squamulose thalli with areoles or squamules often overgrowing a thick prothallus; this morphology occurs in the largely tropical genera Bacidiopsora, Eschatogonia, Phyllopsora, and Physcidia.
piriform
See pyriform.
placodioid lichen
Also placoid, placodiomorph. A crustose lichen with an areolate center and radiating lobes on the circumference.
plasticolous lichen
A lichen that grows on plastic.
platycarpoid
A morphotype of corticolous thelotremoid lichens used to describe characteristics of apothecial and thallus structure. Similar to chroodiscoid or leprocarpoid, but the difference lies in the presence of a free excipulum that forms a distinct double margin. It is exemplified in species such as Chapsa platycarpa and C. neei.
platygonidium
Plural platygonidia. Photobionts that occur in star-shaped or circular colonies; now obsolete.
plectenchyma
Plural plectenchymata. Fungal tissue made of twisted, intertwined hyphae; used as a general term to refer to all types of fungal tissue. The term (and the use of the prefixes "para-" and "proso-" to modify it) was proposed by Gustav Lindau in 1899. See related: paraplectenchyma, prosenchyma, prosoplectenchyma, pseudoparenchyma.
plicate
Characterised by longitudinal folds forming pleats, often used to describe closely adjacent, markedly convex thallus lobes or elongated areoles that display a "folded" appearance.
plurilocular
Also multilocular. Having many cavities or locules; used to describe spore structure.
podetium
Plural podetia. An upright, hollow, stem-like structure bearing apothecia and sometime conidiomata; typically associated with the Cladoniaceae, particularly the genus Cladonia. The term was first used by Erik Acharius in 1803.
POL test
A lichen test performed by shining a polarized light at a lichen structure in microscopic view; in the genus Hypogymnia, the presence (POL+) or absence (POL−) of POL-sensitive crystals in the hypothecium is a useful character to help distinguish species.
polarilocular
Also placodiomorphic, polar-diblastic, polaridiblastic, polaribilocular, polocellate. A spore divided into two components (locules) separated by a central septum with a perforation or isthmus. The term was first used by Wilhelm Körber in 1855 (as "polari-dyblastae") to describe the spores of Rhizocarpon and Umbilicaria. It was anglicized to "polari-bilocular" by William Mudd in 1861, and finally shortened to polarilocular by the Henri Olivier in 1882.
Polychroa-brown
An orange-brown to ochre insoluble lichen pigment, associated with the reference species Bacidia polychroa.
poriform
Shaped like or resembling a pore.
porinoid
A morphotype of corticolous thelotremoid lichens used to describe characteristics of apothecial and thallus structure. This morphotype is similar to ocellularioid, but with a very narrow pore that resembles the opening of a true perithecium. Despite this, the hymenium remains organized in a distinct, compact layer with paraphyses and asci of similar height. Examples include Leucodecton bisporum, L. compunctellum, and T. patwardhanii.
praestantoid
A morphotype of corticolous thelotremoid lichens used to describe characteristics of apothecial and thallus morphology. Praestantoid lichens have large and prominent apothecia with small pores; pores with "finger" (columella); black walls (viewed in microscopic section); and a smooth, more or less shiny thallus. This morphotype occurs in the praestans group of the genus Ocellularia.
primary species
The sexually fertile member of a species pair.
primary thallus
See cladoniiform lichen.
prominent
Sticking out from the surface of the thallus. A more precise definition has been suggested by Aptroot and Lücking, who propose that the term applies to ascomata and pseudostromata that are more than 1/2 above the level of the thallus, and have a base that is expanded outwards.
proper margin
Also proper exciple, true exciple, ectal excipulum, medullary excipulum, proprium. A ring of tissue around the disk of a lecanorine apothecium; this tissue, which originates from the medulla, is not lichenized, and is internal to the thalline margin (if present). The term "proper margin" was first used by Erik Acharius in 1803; in 1825 Elias Fries changed the noun and called it "proper exciple".
proprium
See proper exciple.
prosenchyma
Plural prosenchymata. A type of plectenchyma in which the constituent fungal hyphae are arranged parallel to each other, such that individual hyphae can be clearly distinguished using microscopy.
prosoplectenchyma
Plural prosoplectenchymata. A type of plectenchyma, common in the thallus cortex of lichens, in which the constituent fungal hyphae are aligned in a particular direction.

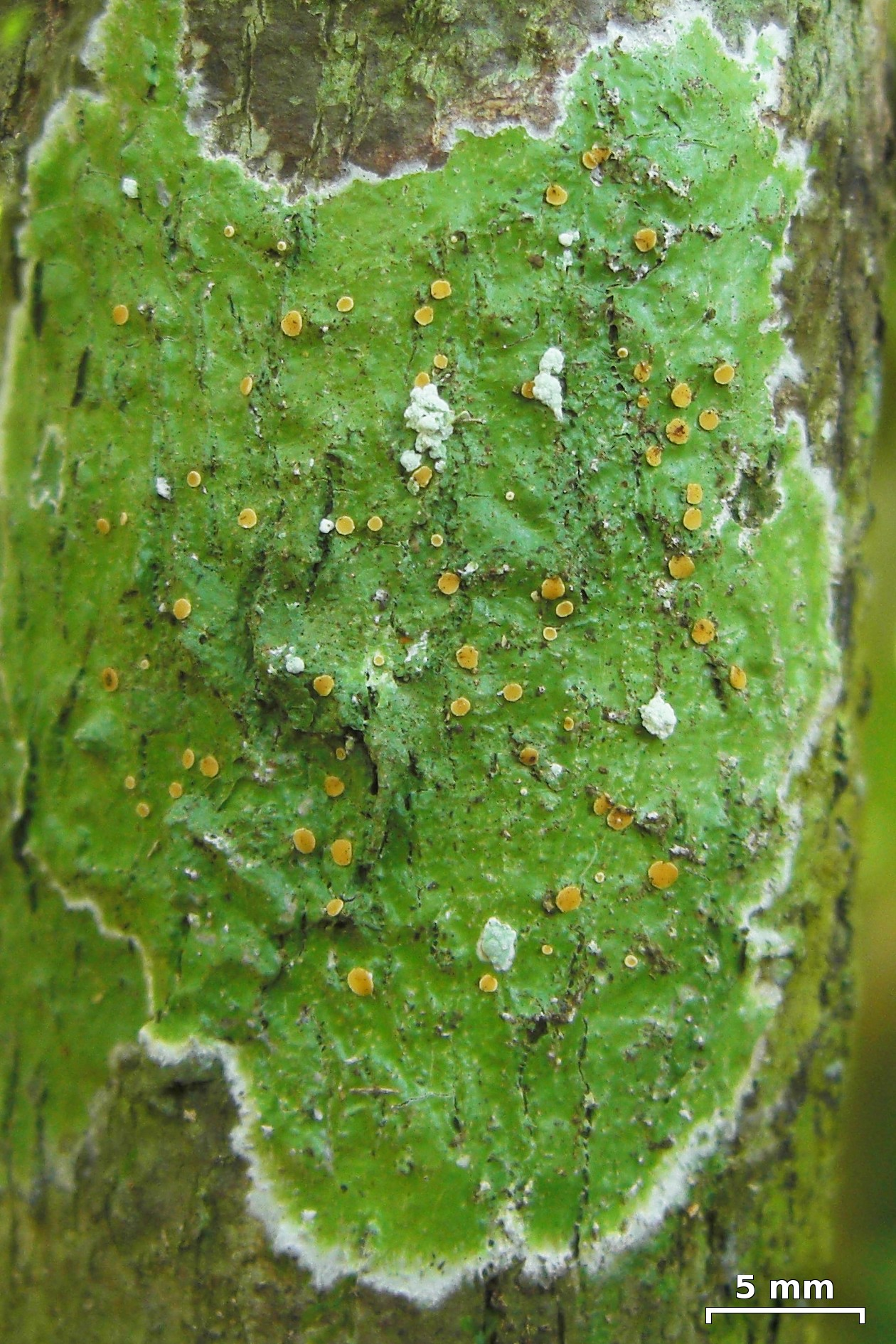
A fibrous white prothallus bordering the thallus is evident in this crustose Coenogonium.

prothallus
A fungal layer upon which an algae-containing thallus may develop, lacking photobiont; usually white, brown, or black, and found between the areoles and at the growing margins of crustose lichens. The term was first used by Georg Meyer in 1825.
prototunicate
A form of unitunicate ascus in which the wall breaks down before maturity (thus releasing its ascospores), and which lacks differentiated apical structures.
proximal
Positioned close to a point of origin or near the center of a body.
pruina
A powdery, frost-like or flour-like deposit on a surface. In lichens, pruina is often the result of the accumulation of crystalline hydrates of calcium oxalate, of lichen products, or sometimes of the dead or dying cells of the epinecral layer.
pruinose
Also pruinate. Covered with pruina.
pseudo-
Also pseud-. A prefix meaning "false"; used in terminology to denote something is false, or that one structure resembles something else, such as the pseudocyphella resembling the cyphella.
pseudoamyloid
See dextrinoid.
pseudocortex
Plural pseudocortices, pseudocortexes. A boundary layer of the thallus containing distinct hyphae that are not organized into a regular tissue structure; sometimes used to refer to the false cortex present on the outer layer of pseudopodetia, such as those found in the lichen Pycnothelia papillaria.

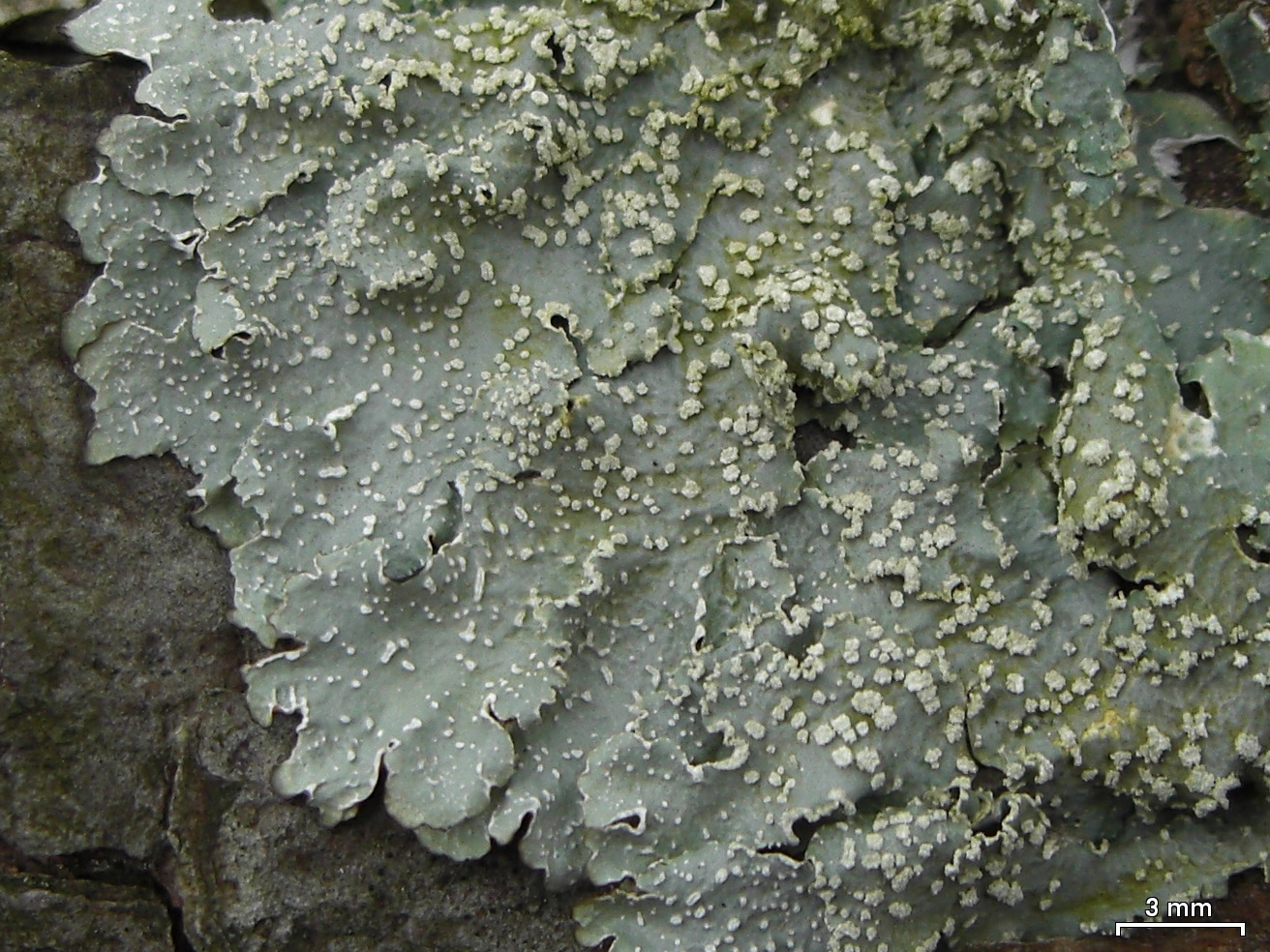
Both white pseudocyphellae and larger, coarse soredia are apparent on the thallus of this Punctelia caseana.

pseudocyphella
Plural pseudocyphellae. Small openings in the cortex of a lichen, where the medulla is exposed to air, and there are no specialized cells surrounding the cavity. The term was first used by William Nylander in 1858.
pseudoisidium
Plural pseudoisidia. An outgrowth on the surface of a lichen thallus that somewhat resembles an isidium, but lacks photosynthetic cells; pseudoisidia are common in the genus Pseudocyphellaria.
pseudoparaphysis
Also cataphysis. A paraphysis-like hypha that forms in the locule or perithecial cavity before the formation of the ascus; it grows downward from the top of the cavity to the base of the ascomata.
pseudoparenchyma
Plural pseudoparenchymata. A type of plectenchyma made of tightly packed, angular or polyhedral cells.

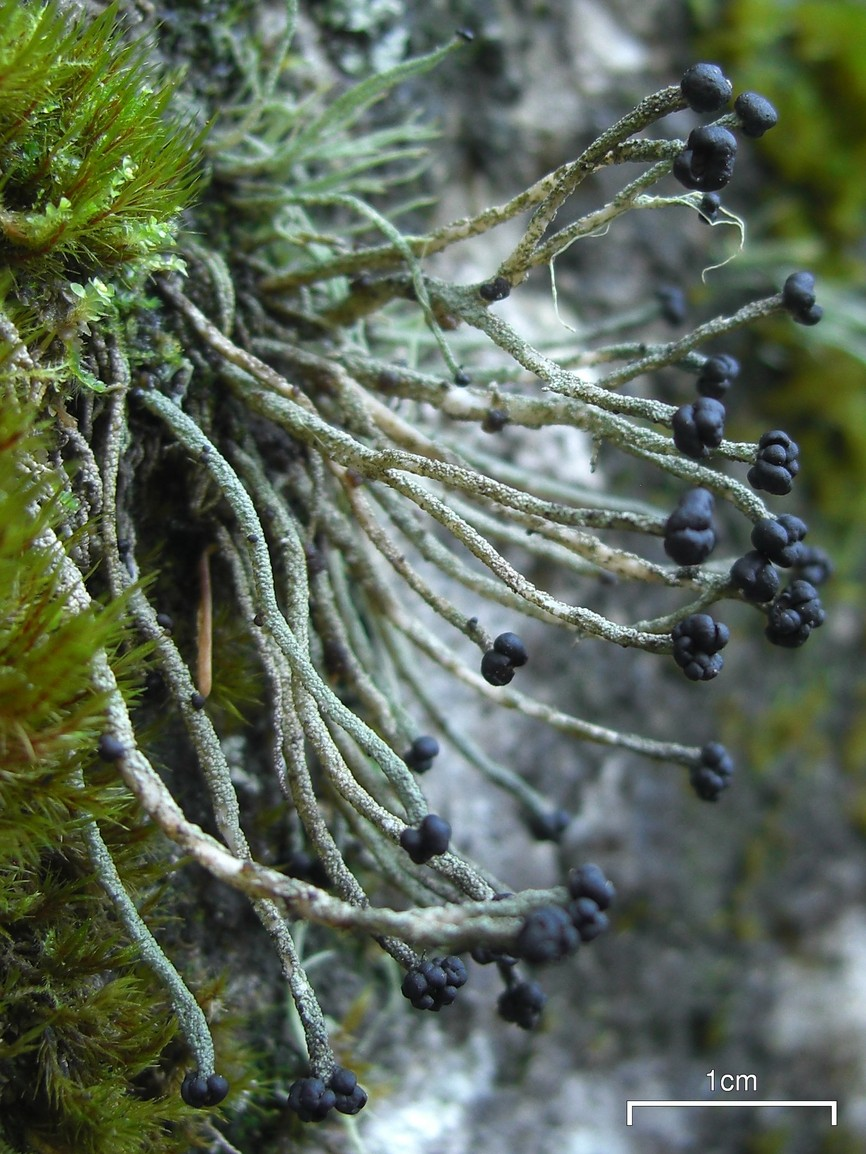
Pilophorus acicularis features rounded black apothecia at the end of pseudopodetia.

pseudopodetium
Plural pseudopodetia. Solid, upright stalks originating from the thallus. They are similar to podetia, but are made of vegetative (rather than generative) tissue. They are associated with the genera Baeomyces, Dibaeis, Leprocaulon, Pilophorus, and Stereocaulon. The term was introduced by Gustav Krabbe in 1882.
pseudostroma
Plural pseudostromata. A stroma made of both thallus tissue and bits of host tissue. The term was used first for lichenized fungi Edvard August Vainio in 1890.
pubescent
Covered with short, soft, fine hairs or down.
pulverulent
Characterised by a fine, powdery surface or consistency; resembling or appearing as dust or powder.
pulvinate
Shaped like a small cushion.
punctate
Having a pattern of minute spots or tiny holes (also known as puncta; plural punctae).
punctiform
Very small or tiny, appearing as a point or dot.
pustulate
Also pustulose. Covered with pustules.
pustule
A blister- or wart-like structure, usually hollow.
pycnidium
Plural pycnidia. An asexual fruiting body, or conidium, that is typically round, obpyriform, or lageniform. It has a circular or elongated ostiole that has an inner surface lined with conidiophores. Pycnidia are common in anamorphic fungi, including many lichenicolous species.
pycnoascocarp
A type of apothecium that originates from a pycnidium; characteristic of the family Lichinaceae. The term was first used by Aino Henssen in 1963.
pyrenocarpous lichen
A lichen with flask-shaped fruiting bodies (perithecia) that develop from the fungal partner. Originally thought to form a natural group, molecular studies have shown pyrenocarpous lichens to be highly polyphyletic, evolving independently in multiple fungal lineages. Most belong to Chaetothyriomycetidae (e.g., Verrucariales, Pyrenulales), with some in Dothideomycetes (e.g., Arthopyreniaceae, Trypetheliaceae) and others unusually placed in Lecanoromycetes (e.g., Porinaceae, Protothelenellaceae, Thelenellaceae). Pyrenocarpous lichens are notably absent from the classical pyrenomycete class Sordariomycetes. This diverse group demonstrates that ascoma morphology alone is insufficient for determining evolutionary relationships, with convergent evolution of perithecial fruiting bodies occurring multiple times across fungal lineages.
pyrenolichen
A lichen that produces perithecia.
pyriform
Also piriform. Shaped like a pear. See related: obpyriform.

== R ==
radial
Also radiate. Referring to lichen thalli, symmetrical around a central axis in transverse section, such as in the genera Alectoria, Bryoria, and Usnea.
radiate
Spreading from a central point.
recurved
Also recurvate, reflexed. Curved or bent back; in lichens, these terms are used to describe the tips of branches or lobes that are curved up or down, or back onto themselves.
redingerioid
A morphotype of corticolous thelotremoid lichens used to describe characteristics of apothecial and thallus morphology. Redingerioid lichens have immersed apothecia with linear slit; slit filled with irregular structures; black walls (viewed in microscopic section); and a smooth, more or less shiny thallus. This morphotype occurs in the genera Redingeria and Stegobolus.
reimnitzioid
A morphotype of corticolous thelotremoid lichens used to describe characteristics of apothecial and thallus morphology. Reimnitzioid lichens have open apothecia with erect lobules, and a rough thallus containing crystals; this morphotype occurs in the genus Reimnitzia.
reniform
Shaped like a kidney.
reticulate
Marked like a net or network.

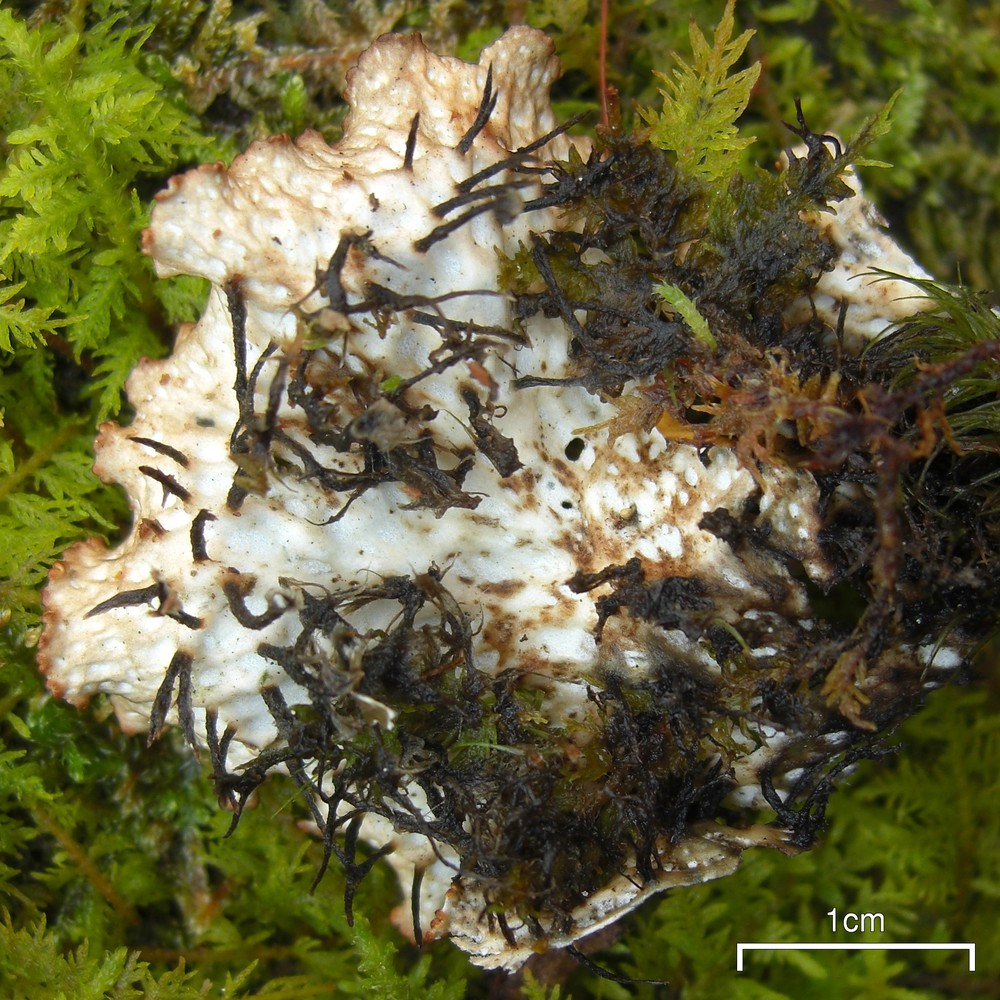
Black, fibrous, and tufted rhizines are on the thallus underside of Peltigera neopolydactyla.

rhizine
Also rhizina, plural rhizinae. A root-like structure that serves as an attachment structure in many foliose lichens.
rhizinomorph
A root-like structure similar to a rhizine that is not involved as an attachment organ; associated with umbilicate lichens.
rhizinose strand
An attachment organ, similar to a rhizine, comprising tough and irregularly branched hyphae; found in some squamulose lichens, such as in the genera Catolechia and Toninia.
rhizohypha
A single hyphal strand on the thallus underside that serves as an attachment organ.
rhodostromoid
A morphotype of corticolous thelotremoid lichens used to describe characteristics of apothecial and thallus morphology. Rhodostromoid lichens have large and prominent apothecia with small pores; pore with "finger" (columella); black walls and pigment (viewed in microscopic section); and a smooth, more or less shiny thallus. This morphotype occurs in the rhodostroma group of the genus Ocellularia.
rimose
Also rimous. Having cracks or splits.
rimula
Plural rimulae. Small fissures or cracks.
rimulose
Also rimulous. Having minute cracks or splits.
rivose
Marked with curvy and irregular furrows, like the thallus of some crustose lichens.
rivulose
Marked with thin, winding or crooked lines.
rostrate
Having a rostrum.
rostrum
Plural rostra. A beak-like projection.
Ruginosa-brown
A dark red to almost black insoluble lichen pigment, associated with the reference species Toninia ruginosa.
rugose
Also rugous. Having a rough texture; wrinkled and creased.
rugulose
Also rugulate. Having a slightly rough texture; with slight wrinkles and creases.
rupicolous
See saxicolous.

== S ==
saccate
Sac- or bag-like in form.
saxicolous lichen
A lichen that grows on stone.
scabioid
A morphotype of corticolous thelotremoid lichens used to describe characteristics of apothecial and thallus structure. This morphotype resembles the leprocarpoid but features recurring hymenia that produce layered excipula, which eventually cover the disk; examples include Chapsa aggregata and C. albomaculata.
scabrous
Also scabrose, scabrid, scabridous. With a crusty, rough surface often resulting from the accumulation of dead cortical material.
schizidium
Plural schizidia. A scale-like propagule originating from the upper layers of a lichen thallus. The term was proposed by Josef Poelt in 1965.
schizobiont
A bacterium that lives in or is associated with a lichen thallus.
schizotremoid
A morphotype of corticolous thelotremoid lichens used to describe characteristics of apothecial and thallus morphology. Schizotremoid lichens lack apothecia and have schizidia, and a smooth, more or less shiny thallus; this morphotype occurs in the genus Stegobolus.
Schweinitzii-red
A dark red insoluble lichen pigment, associated with the reference species Bacidia schweinitzii.
scleroplectenchyma
Plural scleroplectenchymata. A type of plectenchyma comprising thick-walled hyphae that are stuck closely together; present as a component of the stereoma tissue supporting the thallus in the genera Cladonia and Alectoria.
scrobiculate
Having large, shallow depressions that are narrowly separated by rounded ridges. Compare: faveolate, foveolate.

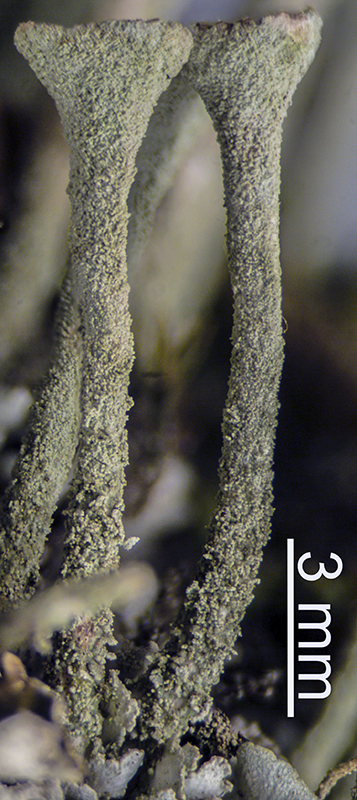
Cup-shaped scyphi atop the podetia of Cladonia fimbriata

scyphus
Plural scyphi. The cup-shaped part at the tip of a lichenized podetium, common in the genus Cladonia. The term was first used by Johann Dillenius in 1742, and later adopted by Carl Linnaeus in 1753.
scutiform
See peltate.
secondary species
The sexually infertile member of a species pair that only reproduces vegetatively.
secondary thallus
See cladoniiform lichen.
Sedifolia-gray
A blackish-gray to gray-green insoluble lichen pigment, associated with the reference species Toninia sedifolia.
segment
A section of a branch that is demarcated by an annular (ring-like) crack.
septum
A wall or partition in a hypha, cell, or spore.
seriate
Arranged in rows.
sessile
Lacking a stem. A more precise definition has been suggested by Aptroot and Lücking, who propose that the term applies to ascomata and pseudostromata that are more than 3/4 above the level of the thallus, with a constricted base.
seta
A stiff hair or bristle-like structure, typically thick-walled and sharp-pointed, found on some lichens.
sibling species
Closely related species that are morphologically indistinguishable but can be distinguished by non-morphological traits, such as chemistry or genetic differences. Initially defined as species recognized mainly through cryptic or non-morphological discontinuities, the concept has evolved to specifically refer to cryptic species that form a monophyletic group, meaning they share a common ancestor not shared with any other species. This concept is a subset of the broader terms species pair and "cryptic species".
sigmoid
Curved upon itself twice, like the letter "S".
simple
Lacking branches or divisions; in lichenology, it is used to describe structures such as thalli or rhizines, or spores without septa.
sinuose
Also sinuous. Wavy, winding, or having a serpentine form, with alternating curves and indentations along the margin or edge.
siphuloid
An informal growth form category applied to lichen genera with a superficially similar foliose to fruticose morphology, notably Siphula, Siphulella, Siphulopsis, Parasiphula, and Knightiellastrum.
soleiform
Shaped like the sole of a shoe, with a flat, elongated, and slightly curved appearance.

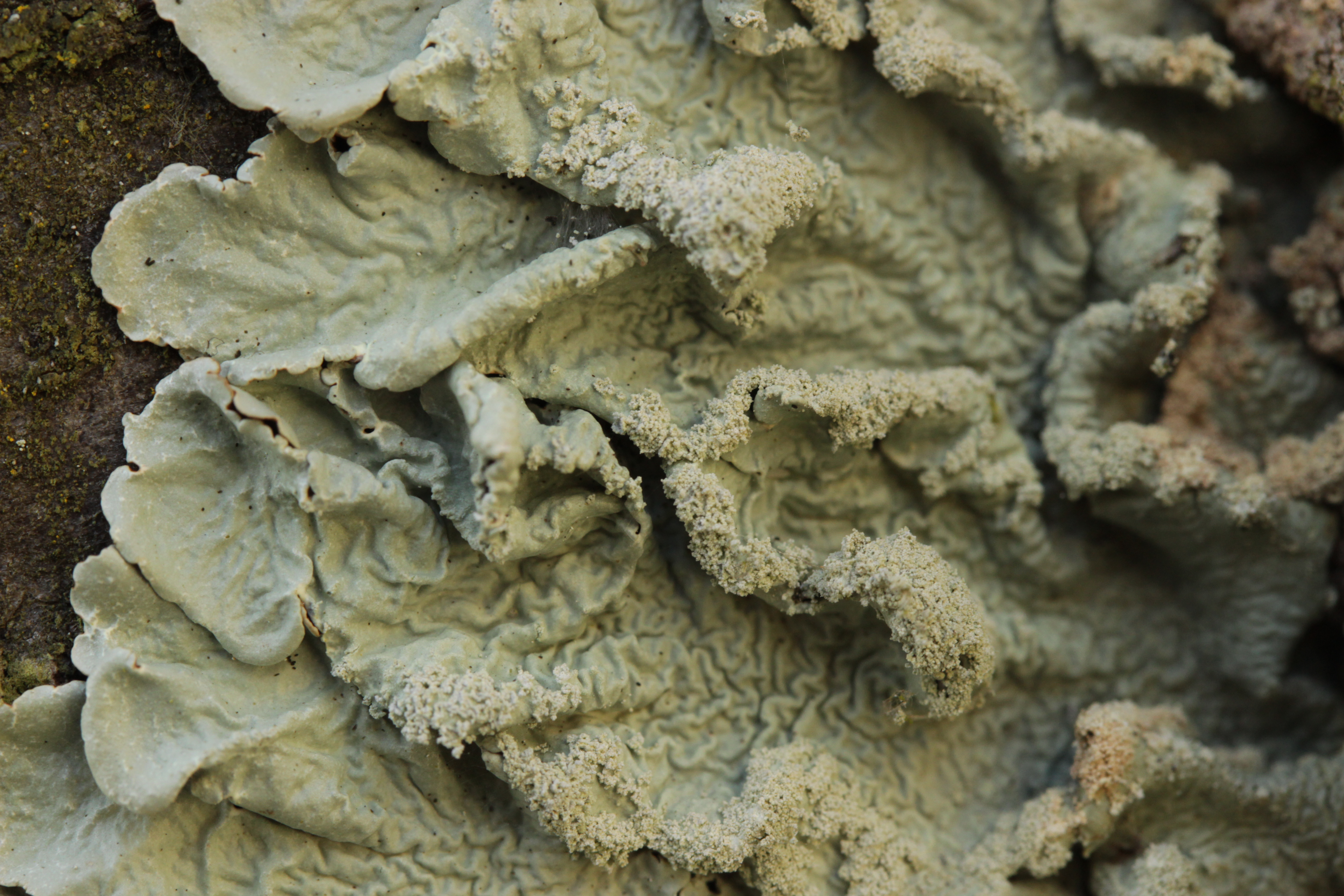
An accumulation of granular soredia is evident on the inner lobe margin soralia of this Flavoparmelia caperata.

soralium
Plural soralia. A part of the thallus where the cortex has cracked or broken down and soredia are produced. Soralia can be further characterized as diffuse if they are spread out on the upper thallus surface as a continuous layer, or delimited if they are confined to a more restricted area. If soralia originate in tubercules they are tuberculate, while they are fissural if they are created in fissures. The term was proposed by Johannes Reinke in 1895.
sorediate
Having soredia.
sorediotremoid
A morphotype of corticolous thelotremoid lichens used to describe characteristics of apothecial and thallus morphology. Sorediotremoid lichens lack apothecia and have soralia, and a smooth, more or less shiny thallus; this morphotype occurs in the genera Myriotrema and Ocellularia.
soredium
Plural soredia. A powdery to granular reproductive propagule that is not covered with a well-defined cortex (in contrast to isidia, and contains both algal (photobiont) and fungal (mycobiont) components. The term was first used by Erik Acharius in 1803.
spathulate
Spoon-shaped.
species pair
Two lichen species that are identical morphologically, anatomically, and chemically, but can be distinguished by their sexual versus asexual reproductive strategies; the fertile taxon is known as the primary species, while the vegetatively reproducing taxon is known as the secondary species. The use of molecular methods to analyze putative species pairs has shown that the underlying phylogenetic situation is more complex than had been assumed, and not necessarily correlated with reproductive strategy. See related: sibling species.
spermogonium
Also spermagone, spermagonium. In lichenology, an obsolete term for pycnidium.
sphaeridium
Plural sphaeridia; see capitulum.
spinule
A small spine; in some fruticose lichens of the Lecanoromycetes, it refers to a small cylindrical outgrowth, with a narrow base, in which the central axis is not connected with the central axis of the main branch.
spinulose
Also spinulous. Covered with or having small spines (spinules) or spiny projections.

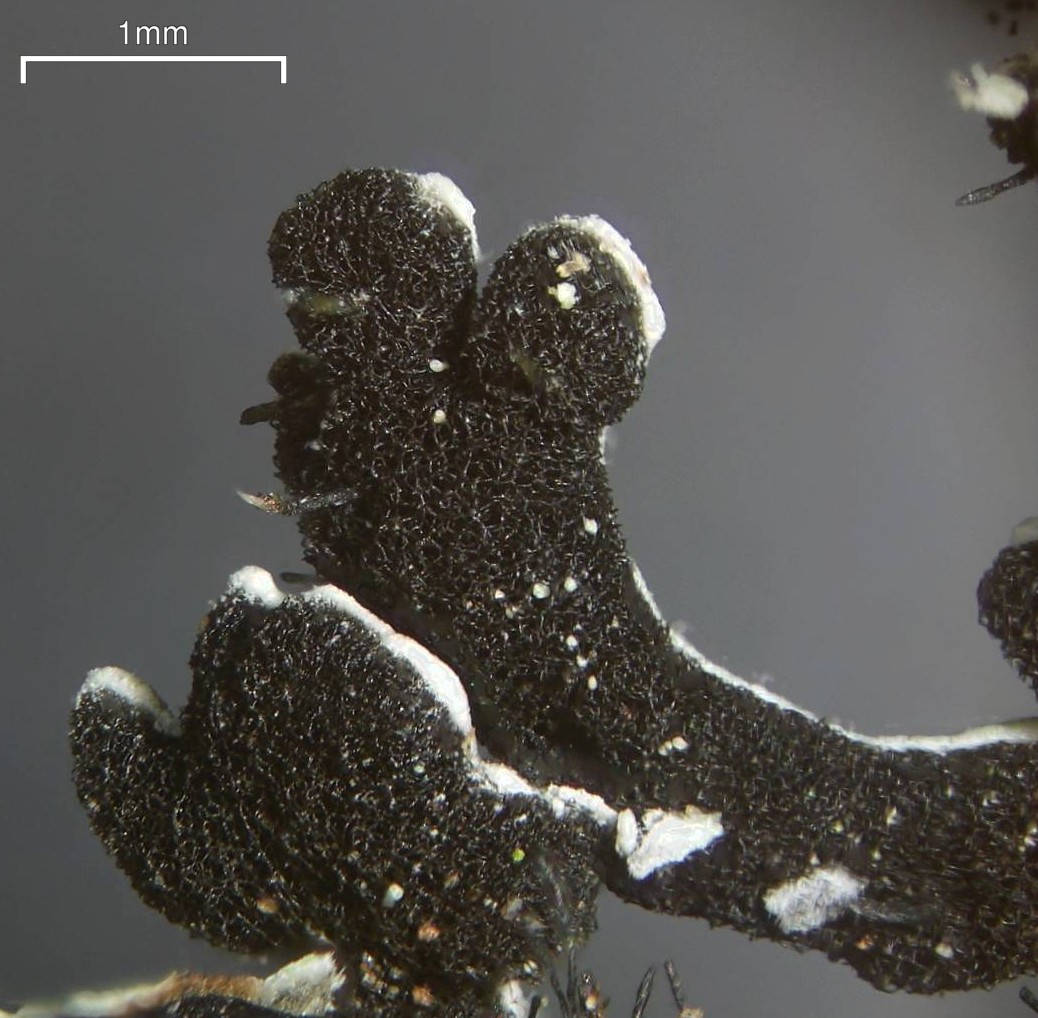
Closeup of the spongiostratum on the lobe undersides of Anzia colpodes

spongiostratum
Plural spongiostrata. A spongy hypothallus found on the lower thallus surface of the genera Anzia and Pannoparmelia.
sporodochium
Plural sporodochia. A cushion-shaped stroma consisting of short conidiophores and pseudoparenchyma that supports a spore mass.
sporomorph
A lichen species that is extremely similar (or identical) in external morphology, anatomy, chemistry, and spore size to another, but that is placed in a different genus solely based on differences in spore septation and/or spore colour. The term was introduced by Michael Wirth and Mason Hale in their 1978 monograph about the Graphidaceae, a family in which sporomorphs are common.

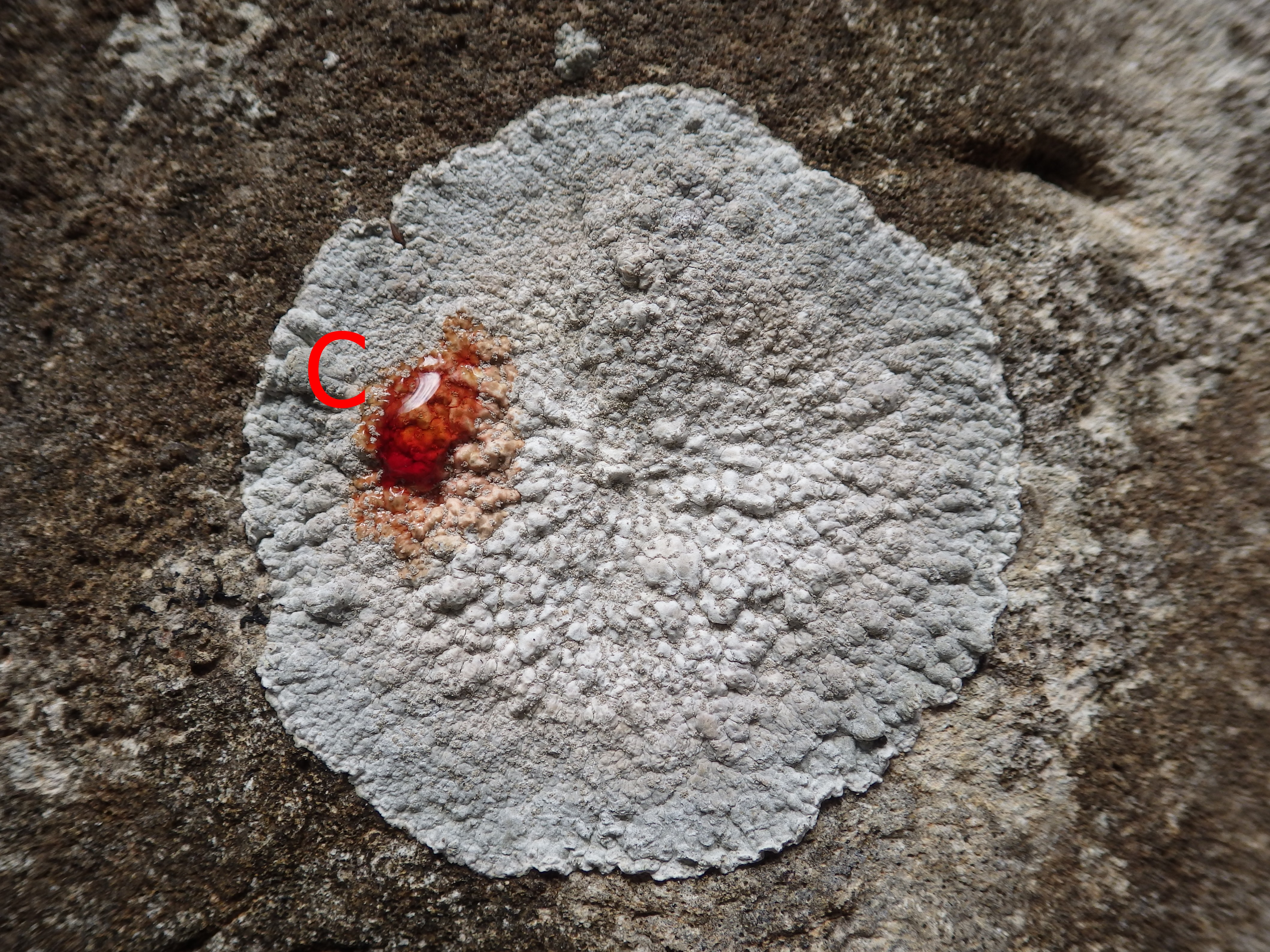
In this spot test, a red color resulting from the application of C on Dirina massiliensis f. sorediata indicates the presence of erythrin.

spot test
A spot analysis used to help identify lichens; it is performed by placing a drop of a reagent on different parts of the lichen and noting any color change associated with application of the reagent. The four most common tests are C, K, KC, and PD.
squamule
A small, flattened, scale-like structure that forms part of the thallus of certain lichens.
squamulose lichen
A lichen with a thallus made of numerous small scales or lobes; intermediate in form between crustose and foliose lichens.
squarrose
Brush-like, with many short, more or less perpendicular lateral branches. In lichenology, used to refer to rhizine structure.
stegoboloid
A morphotype of corticolous thelotremoid lichens used to describe characteristics of apothecial and thallus morphology. Stegoboloid lichens have prominent apothecia with wide pores; pore filled with irregular structures; black walls (viewed in microscopic section); and a smooth, more or less shiny thallus. This morphotype occurs in the genus Stegobolus.
stellate
Also stelliform. Star-shaped.
stereoma
Plural stereomata. Tissue that provides support for the thallus in some species of Lecanorales. See related: scleroplectenchyma.
stratified thallus
A thallus that is divided into distinct layers (strata). See related: heteromerous.
stroma
Plural stromata. A dense mass of vegetative hyphae that supports spore-bearing structures. In lichens, the stroma is often hard and carbonaceous.
sub-
A prefix meaning "below", "under", "somewhat, or "almost". Also used in front of names of taxonomic ranks to indicate intermediate categories, e.g. subspecies or subgenus.
subhymenium
The tissue immediately below the hymenium. The term was first used by Gustaf Einar Du Rietz in 1945.
subiculum
Also subicule. Plural subicula. A layer of loosely-compacted mycelia that covers the substrate and cushions fruiting bodies such as apothecia and perithecia. The texture of the subiculum can be described as net-like, wool-like, or crust-like.
substrate
Also substratum; plural substrata. The surface or base upon which a lichen grows or is attached. Although the terms substratum and substrate are often used equivalently in lichenology, the latter term has different meanings in microbiology and in enzymology.
subulate
Slender and narrowing to a fine point; awl-shaped.
sulcate
With grooves or furrows.
Superba-brown
An orange-brown to ochre insoluble lichen pigment, associated with the reference species Porpidia superba.
superficial
On the surface.

== T ==
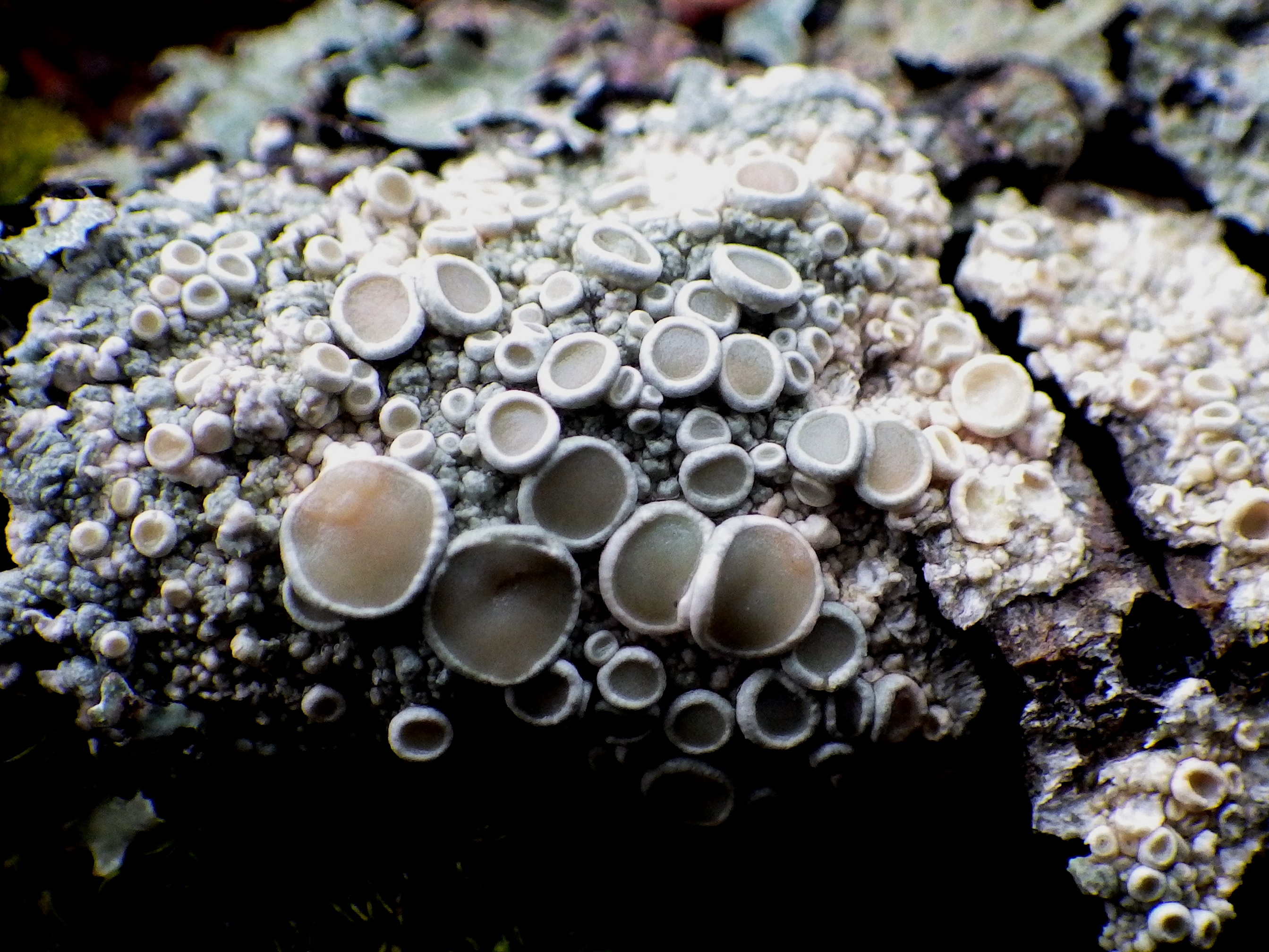
The species name of Ochrolechia tartarea refers to its coarse and fragmented surface.

tartareous
Also tartarean. Having a thick, rough, and crumbly surface.
taxon
Plural taxa. A taxonomic group of any rank; this includes species, genera, families, etc., up to kingdom and even higher.
tenuitremoid
A morphotype of corticolous thelotremoid lichens used to describe characteristics of apothecial and thallus morphology. Tenuitremoid lichens have immersed apothecia with small pores and a black margin; pore with "finger" (columella); black walls (viewed in microscopic section); and a smooth, more or less shiny thallus. This morphotype occurs in the genus Clandestinotrema.
tegulicolous lichen
A lichen that lives on tiles. In general, these are calcicolous lichens or lichens that are indifferent as to their substrate.
terebrate
A thallus with widely spaced perforations.
terete
Describing a cylindrical or rod-like structure that is round in cross-section.
teretiform
Describing a shape that is nearly cylindrical or rod-like, similar to but not exactly terete; circular in cross-section, gradually tapering towards one end.
terricolous lichen
A lichen that grows on soil.

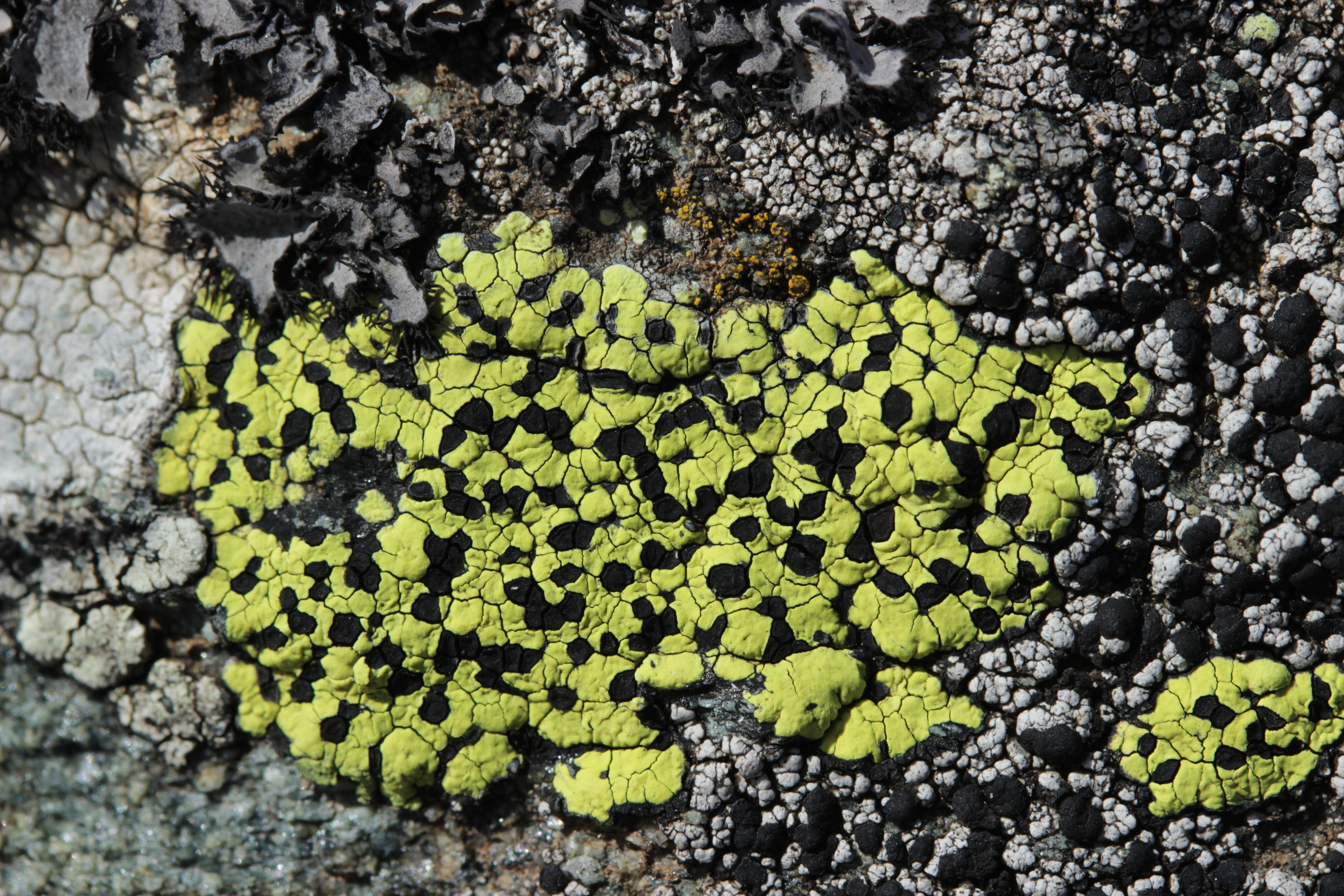
The tessellated thallus of the map lichen, Rhizocarpon geographicum

tessellate
As if formed of small squares or mosaics, like the thallus of Rhizocarpon geographicum.
thalline margin
Also thalline exciple, excipulum thallinum. A rim of tissue around the disk of a lecanorine apothecium; this tissue, external to the inner proper margin, is made of tissue with a structure similar to that of the thallus. The term "thalline margin" was first used by Erik Acharius in 1803; in 1825 Elias Fries changed the noun and called it "thalline exciple".
thallinocarp
A type of ascocarp characteristic of the genus Lichinella (family Lichinaceae); they form from indistinct swellings of the thallus, with a hymenium covered by groups of algal cells.
thalloconidium
Plural thalloconidia. A dark brown, smooth to wrinkled propagule arising directly from a thallus, particularly the lower cortex and/or the rhizines. They are found in some species of Umbilicaria, and similar structures arise from the prothallus of some species in the genera Protoparmelia, Rhizoplaca, and Sporastatia. Thalloconidia have distinct cell layers in their walls, and comprise between 1 and about 2500 cells.
thalloid
Similar to a thallus.
thallospore
An asexual spore produced directly in the thallus or in mycelium. In lichens, they are primarily associated with the genus Umbilicaria, although they also occur in some crustose lichens.
thallus
Plural thalli. The body of a lichen, made up of both fungal and algal or cyanobacterial cells. The term was first used by Erik Acharius in 1803.
thallyle
A small thallus that originates from rhizomorphs; typically associated with the genus Umbilicaria.
thecium
Plural thecia. The part of an apothecium that contains the asci and is situated between the epithecium and the hypothecium. The term is alternatively used more generally to refer to any fruit body that is delimited by a proper wall (i.e., containing only fungal cells), or, as equivalent to hymenium. This last usage was first employed by William Nylander in 1853. See related: apothecium, amphithecium, hamathecium, parathecium, perithecium.

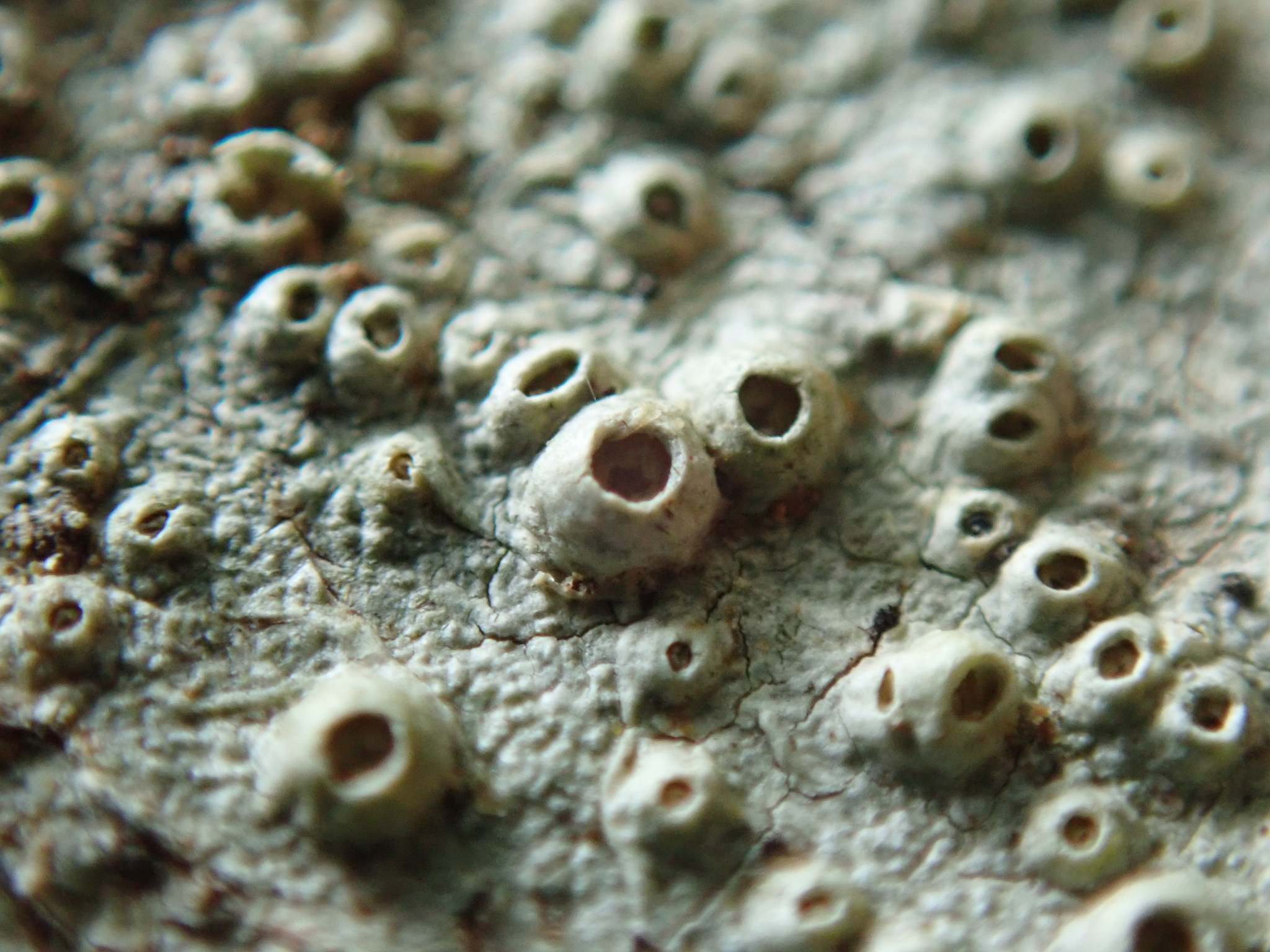
Thelotrema lepadinum is a thelotremoid lichen.

thelotremoid
A morphological group of lichens within the Graphidaceae, the largest family of crustose lichens. Thelotremoid lichens are characterized by immersed-erumpent, rounded ascomata, non-branched to slightly branched paraphyses, mostly distoseptate ascospores, and mostly a prosoplectenchymatous excipulum. Thelotremataceae, a traditional family of lichens, has been included in Graphidaceae, and its species are now informally accepted as thelotremoid lichens.
tholus
Plural tholi. Also dome. The apical, often thickened part of the inner wall in a bitunicate ascus.
tomentum
Plural tomenta. Also defined: tomentose. A layer of short interwoven or coiled fungal hyphae with a texture similar to velvet. In lichens, the tomentum projects from the lower cortex and serves to help it attach to its substrate. Structures with this type of hyphae are called tomentose. Tomentose surfaces are found in foliose genera such as Lobaria, Pseudocyphellaria, and Sticta.
topeliopsidoid
A morphotype of corticolous thelotremoid lichens used to describe characteristics of apothecial and thallus structure. It pertains to lichens where the apothecia are either prominent or sessile, often hidden between the substratum, and they open with multiple, typically regular "teeth" that stay relatively curved over the hardly visible disk. The margins tend to peel off, meaning the overlaying thallus cortex separates from the underlying marginal thallus tissue, but no distinct, clean split between thallus margin and excipulum is formed. This morphotype is seen in species like Chapsa meridensis and Topeliopsis.
trabecula
Plural trabeculae. In the genus Umbilicaria, they are rib- or strap-shaped structures radiating outward from the umbilicus that merge towards the mid-zone of the thallus undersurface.
trentepohlioid
Also trentepohlialean. Resembling or belonging to the green algal genus Trentepohlia; trentepohlioid cells are filamentous (elongated and cylindrical), multicellular, and have a yellow to orange colour.
trebouxioid
Resembling or belonging to the green algal genus Trebouxia; trebouxioid cells are globose with a single central chloroplast.
triguttulate
Containing three oil droplets (guttules).
tripartite lichen
A lichen with a three-partner symbiotic association of mycobiont, photobiont, and cyanobiont. See related: bipartite lichen.
tuberculate
Also tubercular. Covered with tubercules.
tubercule
Also tubercle. A small rounded wart-like projection on a surface.

== U ==
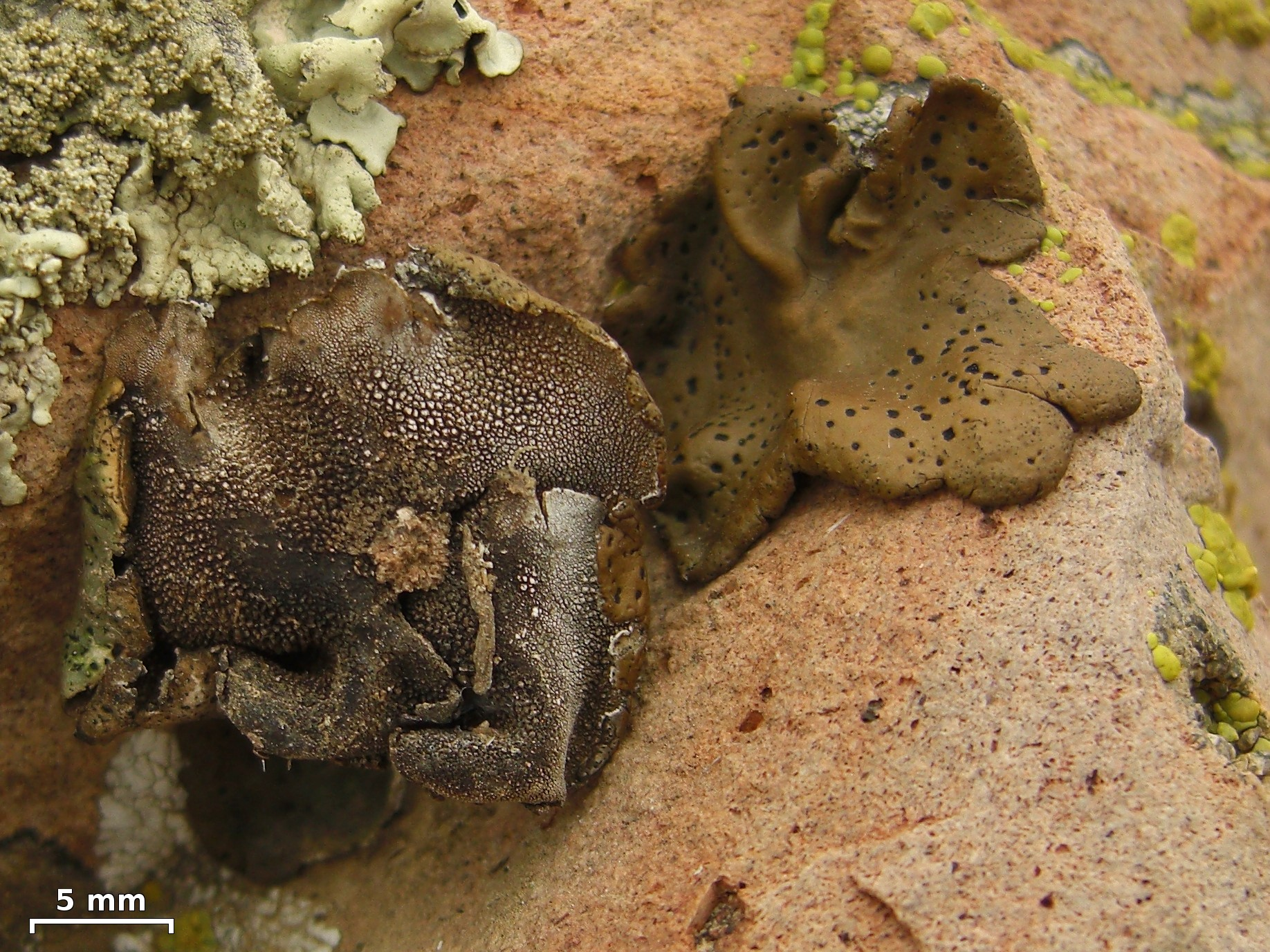
Umbilicaria phaea is a saxicolous, umbilicate lichen.

umbilicate lichen
Also defined: funiculus, umbilicus, umbilical cord. A lichen with a concave, circular, leafy thallus that is joined to its substrate only by its central part, called an umbilicus, umbilical cord or funiculus.
unciform
Hook-shaped.
undulate
Having a wavy form, margin, or surface.
uni-
A prefix meaning "one"; equivalent to the prefix "mono-".
uniguttulate
Containing a single oil droplet (guttule).
unilocular
Containing a single cavity or locule.
uniseriate
Lined up in a single row.
unitunicate
A type of ascus with a single functional layer; the rigid internal and external wall layers do not separate during release of the ascospores. Most ascomycetes have unitunicate asci.
urceolarioid
A morphotype of corticolous thelotremoid lichens used to describe characteristics of apothecial and thallus structure. In this, the fruiting bodies are noticeable to sessile and have a narrow pore with a smooth margin, through which the disk and excipulum are not visible. This morphotype can be observed in Thelotrema isidiophorum, T. subweberi, and T. weberi.

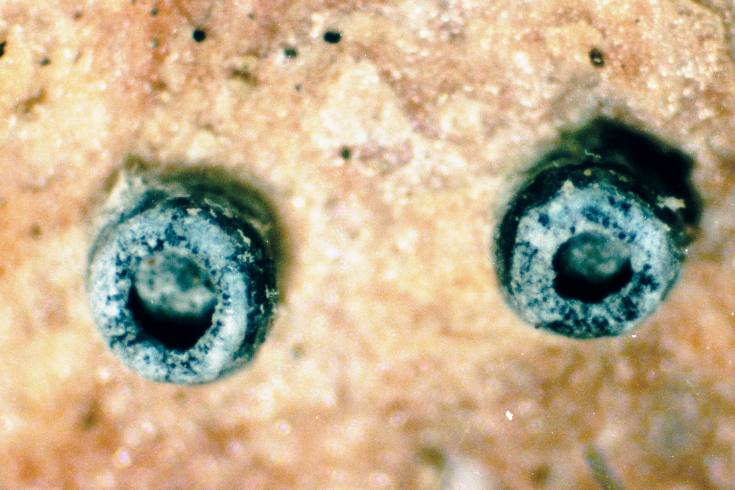
Closeup of the urceolate apothecia of Stictis urceolata

urceolate
Deeply cup-shaped or urn-shaped; in lichens, the term is used to describe some apothecia with a sunken hymenium and elevated parathecium that forms a narrow mouth.
usneoid lichen
An informal growth form category used for fruticose lichens with an elastic central axis in the medulla; these features are characteristic of lichens in the genera Dolichousnea and Usnea.
UV test
A lichen test performed by shining a long-wavelength ultraviolet light (350 nm) at a lichen structure to check if it fluoresces; a positive test (abbreviated as UV+) indicates the presence of certain lichen products. Xanthone compounds in the cortex tend to fluoresce yellow, orange, or red, while depsides and depsidones in the medulla fluoresce blue to white.

== V ==
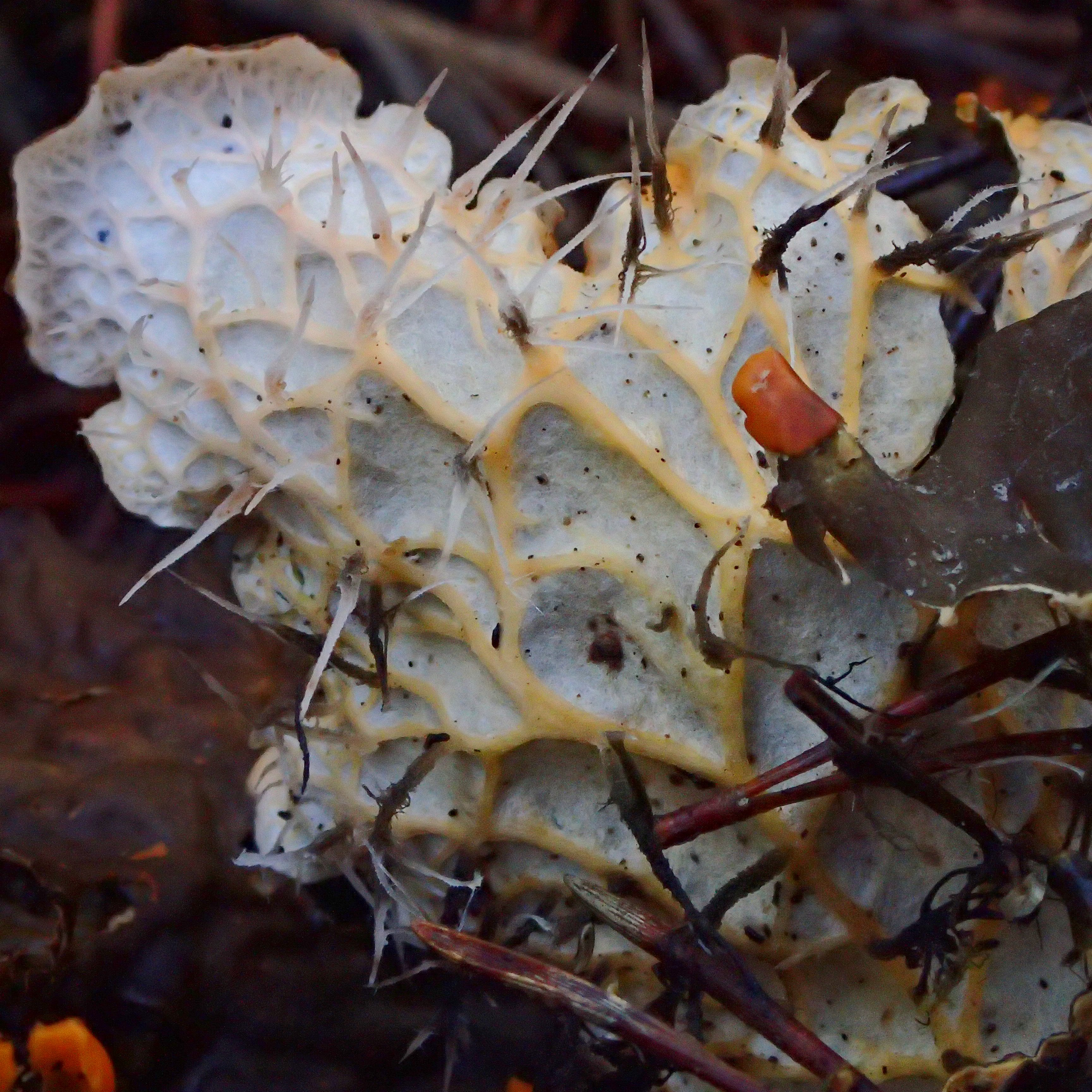
Veins on the underside of Peltigera membranacea

vagrant
A lichen not attached to a substrate, typically able to be blown around by wind.
vegetative
Also assimilative. Having to do with the growth phase of an organism before reproduction, including spore germination, growth, development and asexual multiplication.
vegetative reproduction
Also vegetative multiplication. Any form of asexual reproduction; in lichens, this can involve just the mycobiont (as with thalloconidia), or both the mycobiont and photobiont, as with blastidia, isidia, and soredia.
vein
A cord of tissue on the underside of a foliose thallus, common in the genus Peltigera.
vermiform
Worm-like in shape or form, typically describing elongated structures that are curved or sinuous in appearance.
verruca
Plural verrucae. A small, cone-shaped protuberance, like a small wart.
Verrucarioides-brown
A dull brown insoluble lichen pigment, associated with the reference species Toninia verrucarioides.
verruciform
Having a wart-like shape.
verrucose
A rough surface covered with verrucae.
verruculose
A surface covered with tiny verrucae; delicately verrucose.
vesicle
A small, bubble-like structure or swelling, often formed as a result of trapped air or liquid.
vesiculose
A surface that is blistered or covered with small, bubble-like swellings (vesicles).
vitricolous lichen
A lichen that grows on glass.
voucher
A museum specimen that corresponds to a field collection.

== X ==
xantho-
Also xanth-. A prefix used to indicate the color yellow.

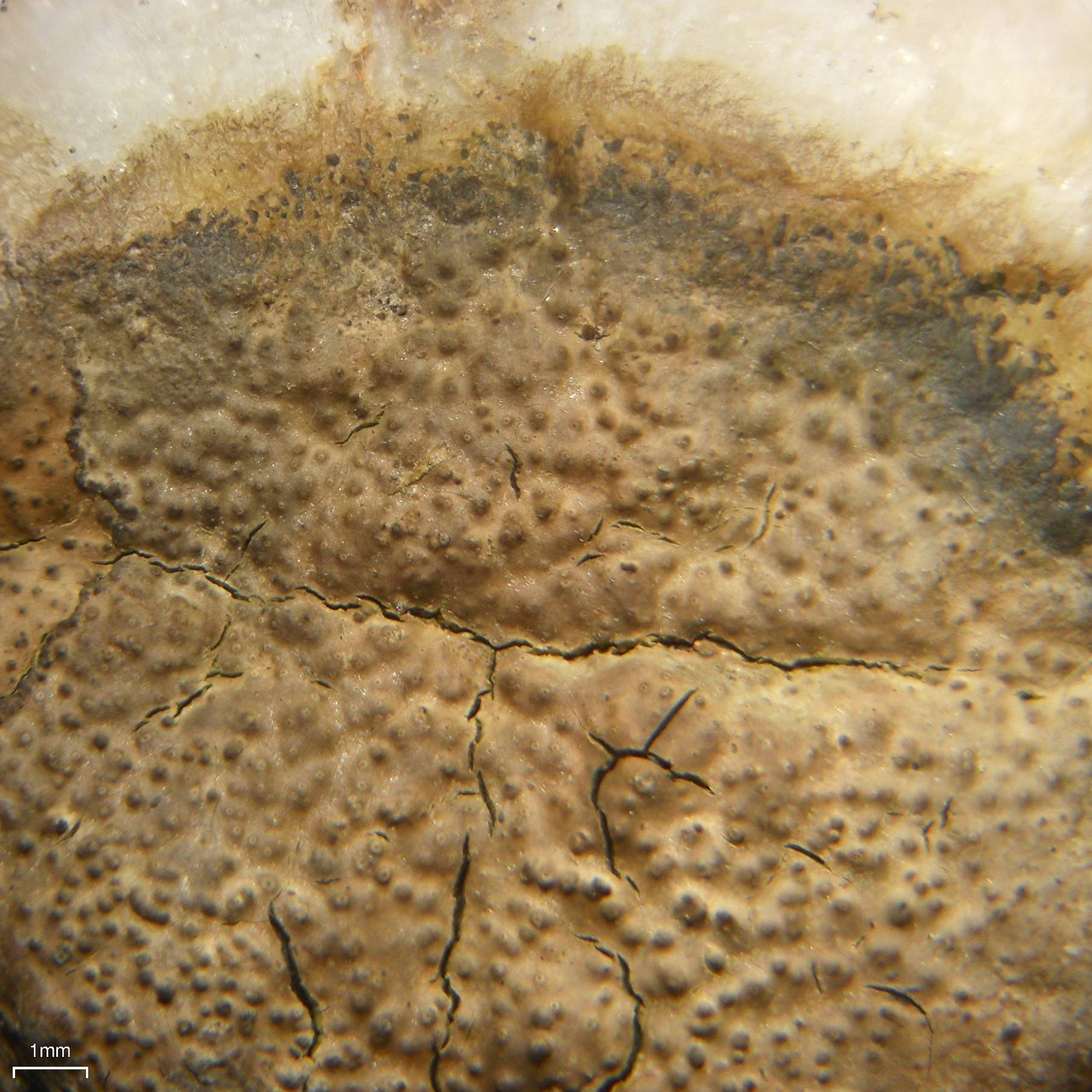
The saxicolous, crustose species Verrucaria funckii is a xantholichen.

xantholichen
A lichen in which the photobiont partner is yellow-green algae (class Xanthophyceae); an example is the lichen formed by the fungus Verrucaria funckii and the yellow-green alga Heterococcus caespitosus.

== Z ==
zeorine
An apothecium with both a thalline exciple and a proper exciple. The term refers to apothecia characteristic of Zeora, a defunct genus that is now synonymous with Lecanora; consequently, the term is more or less obsolete and is equivalent to lecanorine.
zonate
Having concentric lines that form alternating light and dark zones near the thallus margin of a crustose lichen.

== See also ==
- Glossary of biology
- Glossary of mycology
- Glossary of scientific naming
- List of common names of lichen genera
- List of Latin and Greek words commonly used in systematic names

== Citations ==
=== Sources ===
- "Vitricolous lichens – Lichen website". Australian National Botanic Gardens - Botanical Web Portal. Australian National Herbarium. 20 October 2009.
- "Definition of mycobiont". Collins English Dictionary. 2022a.
- "Definition of phycobiont". Collins English Dictionary. 2022b.
- Ahmadjian, Vernon; Hale, Mason E. (1973). The Lichens. New York: Academic Press. ISBN 978-0-12-044950-7.
- Ahti, T. (1982). "The morphological interpretation of cladoniiform thalli in lichens". The Lichenologist. 14 (2): 105–113. doi:10.1017/s0024282982000255.
- Aptroot, André; Lücking, Robert (2016). "A revisionary synopsis of the Trypetheliaceae (Ascomycota: Trypetheliales)". The Lichenologist. 48 (6): 763–982. doi:10.1017/s0024282916000487.
- Breuss, Othmar (2010). "An updated world-wide key to the catapyrenioid lichens (Verrucariaceae)". Herzogia. 23 (2): 205–216. doi:10.13158/heia.23.2.2010.205.
- Brodo, Irwin M.; Sharnoff, Sylvia Duran; Sharnoff, Stephen (2001). Lichens of North America. New Haven, Connecticut: Yale University Press. ISBN 0-300-08249-5.
- Brodo, Irwin (2016). "Glossary". Keys to Lichens of North America: Revised and Expanded. New Haven, Connecticut: Yale University Press. pp. 369–382. ISBN 978-0-300-19573-6.
- Cannon, Paul F.; Kirk, Paul M. (2007). Fungal Families of the World. Wallingford: CABI. ISBN 978-0-85199-827-5. OCLC 60741230.
- Diederich, Paul; Lawrey, James D.; Ertz, Damien (2018). "The 2018 classification and checklist of lichenicolous fungi, with 2000 non-lichenized, obligately lichenicolous taxa". The Bryologist. 121 (3): 340–425. doi:10.1639/0007-2745-121.3.340.
- Dobson, Frank S. (2011). Lichens: An Illustrated Guide to the British and Irish Species. Slough, UK: Richmond Publishing. ISBN 978-0-85546-315-1.
- Ferraro, Lidia Itatí (2004). "Morphological diversity in the hyphopores of Gomphillaceae (Ostropales, lichenized Ascomycetes)" (PDF). Fungal Diversity. 15: 153–169.
- Fjelde, Markus Osaland; Timdal, Einar; Haugan, Reidar; Bendiksby, Mika (2024). "Paraphyly and cryptic diversity unveils unexpected challenges in the "naked lichens" (Calvitimela, Lecanoromycetes, Ascomycota)". Molecular Phylogenetics and Evolution. 190 107944. doi:10.1016/j.ympev.2023.107944. hdl:10852/106762.
- Fraser, Robert H.; Pouliot, Darren; van der Sluijs, Jurjen (2021). "UAV and high resolution satellite mapping of forage lichen (Cladonia spp.) in a rocky Canadian Shield landscape". Canadian Journal of Remote Sensing. 48 (1): 5–18. doi:10.1080/07038992.2021.1908118.
- Galloway, D.J. (6 June 2022). "Flora of Australia Glossary — Lichens". Australian Biological Resources Study.
- Garrido-Benavent, Isaac; Pérez-Ortega, Sergio (2017). "Past, present, and future research in bipolar lichen-forming fungi and their photobionts". American Journal of Botany. 104 (11): 1660–1674. doi:10.3732/ajb.1700182.
- "Glossary of Terms". British Lichen Society. 2022.
- Goward, Trevor (1986). "Brodoa, a new lichen genus in the Parmeliaceae". The Bryologist. 89 (3): 219–223. doi:10.2307/3243288. JSTOR 3243288.
- Grube, Martin; Hawksworth, David L. (2007). "Trouble with lichen: the re-evaluation and re-interpretation of thallus form and fruit body types in the molecular era". Mycological Research. 111 (9): 1116–1132. doi:10.1016/j.mycres.2007.04.008. PMID 17698333.
- Hafellner, Josef; Kalb, Klaus (1995). "Studies in Trichotheliales ordo novus". Studies in Lichenology with Emphasis on Chemotaxonomy, Geography and Phytochemistry. Festschrift Ch. Leuckert. Bibliothecia Lichenologica. Vol. 57. Berlin-Stuttgart: J. Cramer in der Gebrüder Borntraeger Verlagsbuchhandlung. pp. 161–186. ISBN 978-3-44-358036-0.
- Hawksworth, D. L. (1988). "The variety of fungal-algal symbioses, their evolutionary significance, and the nature of lichens". Botanical Journal of the Linnean Society. 96 (1): 3–20. doi:10.1111/j.1095-8339.1988.tb00623.x.
- Hertel, Hannes (2009). "A new key to cryptothalline species of the genus Lecidea (Lecanorales)". In Aptroot, A.; Seaward, M.R.D.; Sparrius, L.B. (eds.). Biodiversity and Ecology of Lichens – Liber Amicorum Harrie Sipman. Bibliotheca Lichenologica. Vol. 99. Berlin/Stuttgart: J.Cramer in der Gebrüder Borntraeger Verlagsbuchhandlung. pp. 185–204. ISBN 978-3-443-58078-0.
- Honegger, Rosmarie (1991). "Functional aspects of the lichen symbiosis". Annual Review of Plant Physiology and Plant Molecular Biology. 42 (1): 553–578. doi:10.1146/annurev.pp.42.060191.003005.
- Jagtap, Vineeta; Tripathi, Manish; Joshi, Yogesh (2013). "First report on the occurrence of plasticolous lichens from Uttarakhand, India" (PDF). Journal of Applied and Natural Science. 5 (2): 342–344. doi:10.31018/jans.v5i2.329.
- Kantvilas, G. & Jarman, S.J. (1999). Lichens of rainforest in Tasmania. Canberra, ACT, Australia: Australian Biological Resources Study. ISBN 0-642-56802-2.
- Kantvilas, Gintaras (2023). "Three new species of siphuloid lichens, with a first key to the genus Parasiphula". The Lichenologist. 55 (1): 17–25. doi:10.1017/s0024282922000421.
- Kitaura, Marcos J.; Marcelli, Marcelo P. (2013). "A revision of Leptogium species with spherical-celled hairs (section Mallotium p.p.)". The Bryologist. 116 (1): 15–27. doi:10.1639/0007-2745-116.1.015.
- Kirk, Paul M.; Cannon, Paul F.; Minter, David W.; Stalpers, Joost A., eds. (2008). Dictionary of the Fungi. Vol. 10. CAB International. ISBN 978-1-84593-933-5.
- Kistenich, Sonja; Timdal, Einar; Bendiksby, Mika; Ekman, Stefan (2018). "Molecular systematics and character evolution in the lichen family Ramalinaceae (Ascomycota: Lecanorales)". Taxon. 67 (5): 871–904. doi:10.12705/675.1. hdl:11250/2599544.
- Korf, Richard P. (1962). "A synopsis of the Hemiphacidiaceae, a family of the Helotiales (Discomycetes) causing needle-blights of conifers". Mycotaxon. 54 (1): 12–33.
- Krzewicka, Beata (2004). "The lichen genera Lasallia and Umbilicaria in the Polish Tatra mts". Polish Botanical Studies. 17: 1–88.
- Lange, Otto L.; Wagenitz, Gerhard (2003). "What is a 'phycolichen'? Differences and changes in the meaning of an old lichenological term". The Lichenologist. 35 (4): 341–345. doi:10.1016/S0024-2829(03)00038-0.
- Laundon, Jack R. (1995). "On the classification of lichen photomorphs". Taxon. 44 (3): 387–389. doi:10.2307/1223409. JSTOR 1223409.
- Lendemer, James C.; Buck, William R.; Harris, Richard C. (September 2016). "Two new host-specific hepaticolous species of Catinaria (Ramalinaceae)". The Lichenologist. 48 (5): 441–449. doi:10.1017/S0024282916000438.
- Lücking, Robert; Leavitt, Steven D.; Hawksworth, David L. (2021). "Species in lichen-forming fungi: balancing between conceptual and practical considerations, and between phenotype and phylogenomics". Fungal Diversity. 109 (1): 99–154. doi:10.1007/s13225-021-00477-7.
- "Lichen Basics". North American Mycological Association.
- Lumbsch, H. Thorsten; Huhndorf, Sabine M. (2007). "Whatever happened to the pyrenomycetes and loculoascomycetes?". Mycological Research. 111 (9): 1064–1074. doi:10.1016/j.mycres.2007.04.004. PMID 18029164.
- MacKenzie Lamb, I. (1968). "Appendix II. Glossary of Technical Terms". Antarctic Lichens. II. The Genera Buellia and Rinodina (Report). British Antarctic Survey Scientific Reports. British Antarctic Survey.
- McCune, B.; Wang, L.S. (2014). "The lichen genus Hypogymnia in southwest China". Mycosphere. 5 (1): 27–76. doi:10.5943/mycosphere/5/1/2.
- Mercado-Díaz, Joel A.; Gould, William A.; González, Grizelle; Lücking, Robert (2015). Lichens in Puerto Rico: an ecosystem approach. Gen. Tech. Rep. IITF-GTR-46 (Report). San Juan, Puerto Rico: United States Department of Agriculture, Forest Service, International Institute of Tropical Forestry.
- Meyer, Barbara; Printzen, Christian (2000). "Proposal for a standardized nomenclature and characterization of insoluble lichen pigments". The Lichenologist. 32 (6): 571–583. doi:10.1006/lich.2000.0294.
- Mitchell, M.E. (2014). "De Bary's legacy: the emergence of differing perspectives on lichen symbiosis" (PDF). Huntia. 15 (1): 5–22.
- Moncada, Bibiana; Lücking, Robert; Betancourt-Macuase, Luisa (2013). "Phylogeny of the Lobariaceae (lichenized Ascomycota: Peltigerales), with a reappraisal of the genus Lobariella". The Lichenologist. 45 (2): 203–263. doi:10.1017/s0024282912000825.
- Moncada, Bibiana; Rincón-Murillo, Diego; Lücking, Robert (2023). "Three new lobarioid lichens (lichenized Ascomycota: Peltigeraceae) from Colombia, honoring Enrique Forero". Revista de la Academia Colombiana de Ciencias Exactas, Físicas y Naturales. 47 (184): 619–640. doi:10.18257/raccefyn.1978.
- Nelsen, Matthew P.; Plata, Eimy Rivas; Andrew, Carrie J.; Lücking, Robert; Lumbsch, H. Thorsten (2011). "Phylogenetic diversity of trentepohlialean algae associated with lichen-forming fungi". Journal of Phycology. 47 (2): 282–290. doi:10.1111/j.1529-8817.2011.00962.x. PMID 27021860.
- Orange, A.; James, P.W.; White, F.J. (2001). Microchemical Methods for the Identification of Lichens. British Lichen Society. ISBN 978-0-9540418-0-9.
- Øvstedal, D.O.; Lewis Smith, R.I. (2001). "Glossary". Lichens of Antarctica and South Georgia. A Guide to Their Identification and Ecology. Cambridge, UK: Cambridge University Press. pp. 367–374. ISBN 978-0-521-66241-3.
- Poelt, J. (1980). "Physcia opuntiella spec. nov. und die Lebeusform der Sprosseuden Flechten" [Physcia opuntiella spec. nov. and the life form of the branching lichens]. Flora. 169 (1): 23–31. doi:10.1016/s0367-2530(17)31162-3.
- Poelt, J.; Obermayer, W. (1990). "Über Thallosporen bei einigen Krustenflechten" [On thallospores in some crustose lichens]. Herzogia (in German). 8 (3–4): 273–288. doi:10.1127/herzogia/8/1990/273.
- Rikkinen, Jouko (April 2015). "Cyanolichens". Biodiversity and Conservation. 24 (4): 973–993. doi:10.1007/s10531-015-0906-8.
- Nash III, Thomas H., ed. (2008). Lichen Biology (2nd ed.). Cambridge, UK: Cambridge University Press. ISBN 978-0-521-69216-8.

Nash, T.H. III (2008). "1. Introduction". In Nash III, Thomas H. (ed.). Lichen Biology (2nd ed.). Cambridge, UK: Cambridge University Press. pp. 1–8. ISBN 978-0-521-69216-8.
Honegger, R. (2008). "3.Mycobionts". In Nash III, Thomas H. (ed.). Lichen Biology (2nd ed.). Cambridge, UK: Cambridge University Press. pp. 27–39. ISBN 978-0-521-69216-8.
Büdel, B.; Scheidegger, C. (2008). "4.Thallus morphology and anatomy". In Nash III, Thomas H. (ed.). Lichen Biology (2nd ed.). Cambridge, UK: Cambridge University Press. pp. 40–68. ISBN 978-0-521-69216-8.

- Nelsen, Matthew P.; Lücking, Robert; Aptroot, André; Andrew, Carrie J.; Cáceres, Marcela; Plata, Eimy Rivas; Gueidan, Cécile; da Silva Canêz, Luciana; Knight, Allison; Ludwig, Lars R.; Mercado-Díaz, Joel A.; Parnmen, Sittiporn; Lumbsch, H. Thorsten (2014). "Elucidating phylogenetic relationships and genus-level classification within the fungal family Trypetheliaceae (Ascomycota: Dothideomycetes)". Taxon. 63 (5): 974–992. doi:10.12705/635.9.
- Nelsen, Matthew P.; Lücking, Robert; Boyce, C. Kevin; Lumbsch, H. Thorsten; Ree, Richard H. (2020). "The macroevolutionary dynamics of symbiotic and phenotypic diversification in lichens". Proceedings of the National Academy of Sciences. 117 (35): 21495–21503. doi:10.1073/pnas.2001913117. PMC 7474681. PMID 32796103.
- Papong, Khwanruan; Boonpragob, Kansri; Mangold, Armin; Divakar, Pradeep K.; Lumbsch, H. Thorsten (2010). "Thelotremoid lichen species recently described from Thailand: a re-evaluation". The Lichenologist. 42 (2): 131–137. doi:10.1017/s0024282909990405.
- Randlane, Tiina; Tõrra, Tiiu; Saag, Andres; Saag, Lauri (2009). "Key to European Usnea species". In Thell, Arne; Seaward, Mark R. D.; Feuerer, Tassilo (eds.). Diversity of Lichenology – Anniversary Volume. Bibliotheca Lichenologica. Vol. 100. Stuttgart: J. Kramer. pp. 419–462. ISBN 978-3-443-58079-7.
- Rapai, Sean B.; McMullin, Richard Troy; Newmaster, Steven G. (2012). "The importance of macrolichen traits and phylogeny in forest community assemblage along a high elevation gradient in southwestern British Columbia". Forest Ecology and Management. 274: 231–240. doi:10.1016/j.foreco.2012.02.018.
- Rivas Plata, Eimy; Lücking, Robert; Sipman, Harrie J. M.; Mangold, Armin; Kalb, Klaus; Lumbsch, H. Thorsten (2010). "A world-wide key to the thelotremoid Graphidaceae, excluding the Ocellularia-Myriotrema-Stegobolus clade". The Lichenologist. 42 (2): 139–185. doi:10.1017/s0024282909990491.
- Ryan, B.D.; Bungartz, F.; Hagedorn, G.; Rambold, G., eds. (2022). "LIAS glossary – A Wiki-based Online Dictionary for Ascomycete Terminology used by LIAS, the Global Information System for Lichenized and Non-Lichenized Ascomycetes". LIAS Glossary.
- Sanders, William B. (2004). "Bacteria, algae, and phycobionts: maintaining useful concepts and terminology". The Lichenologist. 36 (5): 269–275. doi:10.1017/s0024282904014343.
- Scott, G.D. (1957). "Lichen terminology". Nature. 179 (4557): 486–487. doi:10.1038/179486b0. PMID 13407756.
- Sérusiaux, E.; Lücking, R. (2007). "Gallaicolichen, a new genus of foliicolous lichen with unique diaspores". In Kärnefelt, Ingvar; Thell, Arne (eds.). Lichenological Contributions in Honour of David Galloway. Bibliotheca Lichenologica. Vol. 95. Berlin/Stuttgart: J. Cramer. pp. 509–516. ISBN 978-3-443-58074-2.
- Smith, C.W.; Aptroot, A.; Coppins, B.J.; Fletcher, A.; Gilbert, O.L.; James, P.W.; Wolseley, P.A., eds. (2009). "Glossary". The Lichens of Great Britain and Ireland. London: British Lichen Society. pp. 21–39.
- Suryanarayanan, Trichur S.; Thirunavukkarasu, Nagamani (2017). "Endolichenic fungi: the lesser known fungal associates of lichens". Mycology. 8 (3): 189–196. doi:10.1080/21501203.2017.1352048. PMC 6059131. PMID 30123639.
- Upreti, Dalip K.; Rai, Himanshu, eds. (2013). Terricolous Lichens in India. Vol. 1: Diversity Patterns and Distribution Ecology. New York: Springer. ISBN 978-1-4614-8736-4.
- Silverstein, Alvin; Silverstein, Virginia B.; Silverstein, Robert A. (1996). Fungi. New York: Twenty-First Century Books. ISBN 0-8050-3520-6.
- Smith, Annie Lorrain (1921). Lichens. London: Cambridge University Press. pp. 1–504.
- Thell, Arne; Crespo, Ana; Divakar, Pradeep K.; Kärnefelt, Ingvar; Leavitt, Steven D.; Lumbsch, H. Thorsten; Seaward, Mark R.D. (2012). "A review of the lichen family Parmeliaceae – history, phylogeny and current taxonomy". Nordic Journal of Botany. 30 (6): 641–664. doi:10.1111/j.1756-1051.2012.00008.x.
- Thüs, Holger; Schultz, Matthias (2009). "Glossary". In Büdel, Burkhard; Gärtner, Georg; Krienitz, Lothar; Preisig, Hans R.; Schagerl, Michael (eds.). Fungi. Part 1: Lichens. Süßwasserflora von Mitteleuropa [Freshwater Flora of Central Europe]. Vol. 21/1. Heidelberg: Spektrum Akademischer Verlag. pp. 14–23. doi:10.1007/978-3-8274-2299-6_2. ISBN 978-3-8274-1594-3.
- Tripp, Erin (2017). Field Guide to the Lichens of White Rocks (Boulder, Colorado). University Press of Colorado. ISBN 978-1-60732-554-3.
- Ulloa, Miguel; Hanlin, Richard T. (2012). Illustrated Dictionary of Mycology (2nd ed.). St. Paul, Minnesota: The American Phytopathological Society. ISBN 978-0-89054-400-6.
- Vondrák, Jan; Svoboda, Stanislav; Zíbarová, Lucie; Štenclová, Lenka; Mareš, Jan; Pouska, Václav; Košnar, Jiří; Kubásek, Jiří (2023). "Alcobiosis, an algal-fungal association on the threshold of lichenisation". Scientific Reports. 13 (2957): 2957. doi:10.1038/s41598-023-29384-4. PMC 9975235. PMID 36854763.
- Weber, Bettina; Büdel, Burkhard (2011). "Endoliths". Encyclopedia of Geobiology. Dordrecht: Springer Netherlands. pp. 348–355. doi:10.1007/978-1-4020-9212-1_80. ISBN 978-1-4020-9211-4.
- Wirth, M.; Hale Jr., M.E. (1978). Morden-Smithsonian Expedition to Dominica: The Lichens (Graphidaceae). Smithsonian Contributions to Botany. Vol. 40. pp. 1–64.
