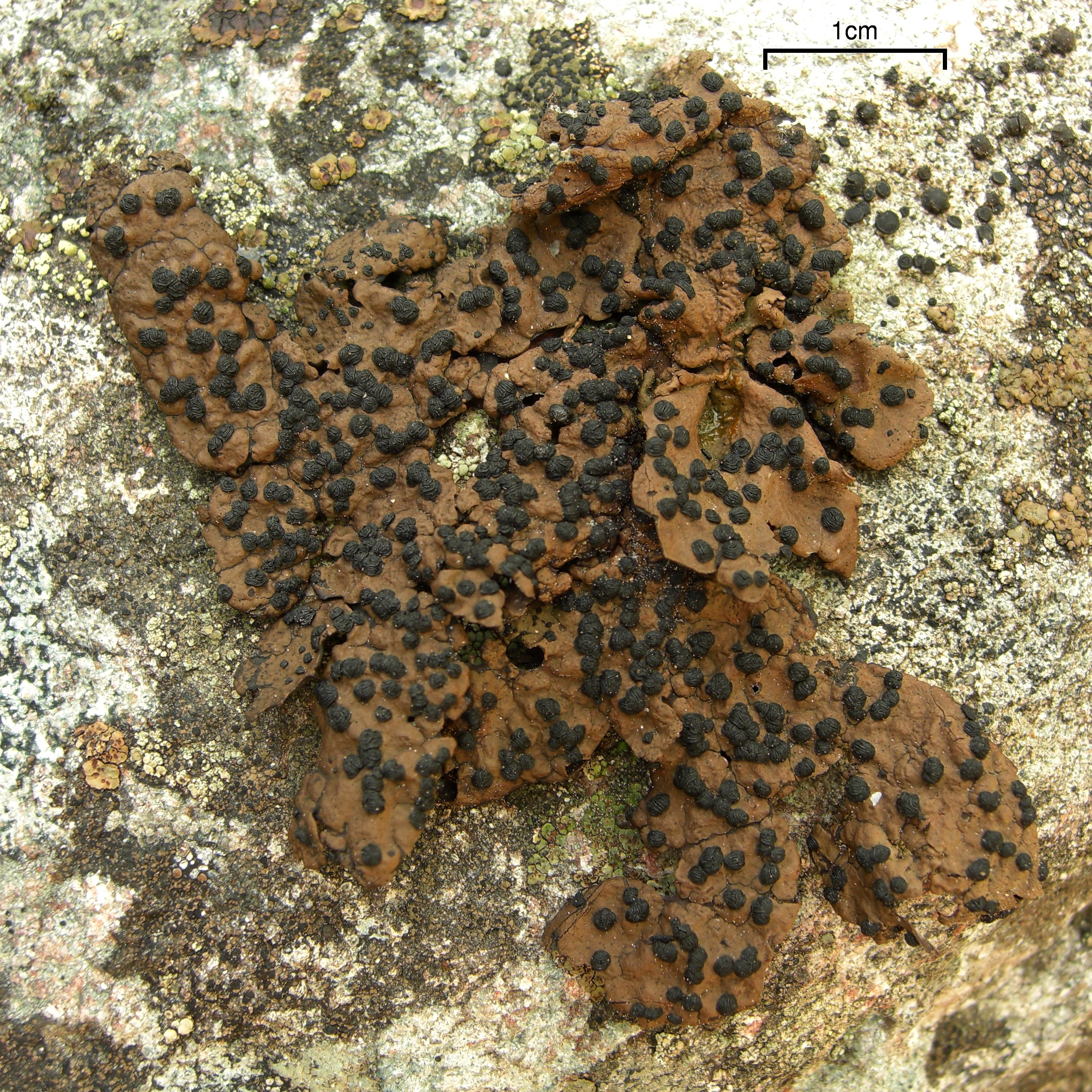
- Umbilicaria hyperborea

Scientific classification
- Kingdom: Fungi
- Division: Ascomycota
- Class: Lecanoromycetes
- Order: Umbilicariales
- Family: Umbilicariaceae
- Genus: Umbilicaria; Hoffm. (1789)

Type species
- Umbilicaria hyperborea (Ach.) Hoffm. (1796)

Synonyms
- List: Actinogyra Schol. (1934); Agyrophora (Nyl.) Nyl. (1896); Graphis sect. Umbilicaria (Hoffm.) Wallr. (1831); Gyromium Wahlenb. (1812); Gyrophora Ach. (1803); Gyrophora sect. Agyrophora (Nyl.) Zahlbr. (1906); Gyrophora sect. Gyromium (Wahlenb.) Stizenb. (1862); Gyrophoromyces E.A.Thomas ex Cif. & Tomas. (1953); Llanoa C.W.Dodge (1968); Merophora Clem. (1909); Omphalodiscus Schol. (1934); Omphalosia Neck. ex Kremp. (1869); Parmophora M.Choisy (1950); Umbilicaria sect. Agyrophora (Nyl.) Zahlbr. (1927); Umbilicaria subgen. Agyrophora Nyl. (1878)

= Umbilicaria =

Genus of lichen-forming fungi

Umbilicaria is a genus of lichen-forming fungi in the family Umbilicariaceae, established by Georg Franz Hoffmann in 1789. Its members are foliose, leaf-like lichens that grow on rock and are attached to the surface at a single central point — the umbilicus — giving them their characteristic navel-like form. Species occur on every continent and are especially associated with exposed siliceous rock in cold climates, including alpine, arctic, boreal, and Antarctic environments. The genus is commonly known as rock tripe, a name that reflects a long history of use as an emergency food source in northern regions.

The photobiont in Umbilicaria is a green alga of the genus Trebouxia. Reproduction is varied: many species reproduce sexually by ascospores, while others produce asexual thalloconidia from the lower thallus surface or lichenized propagules such as isidia or soredia. The secondary chemistry of the genus is dominated by gyrophoric acid, a tridepside detected in the great majority of species surveyed. Umbilicaria species are slow-growing pioneers of bare rock surfaces, and several have been studied as models for lichen cold tolerance and desiccation survival. The number of accepted species is debated, because authors differ over the circumscription of the genus within Umbilicariaceae.

== Taxonomy ==
Umbilicaria was established by Georg Franz Hoffmann in 1789 in the first fascicle of his Descriptio et adumbratio plantarum e classe cryptogamica Linnaei, quae lichenes dicuntur; because 1790 appears on the title page, some bibliographic treatments cite the work as 1789 [1790]. Hoffmann used the genus for the distinctive "umbilicate" lichens, united by their attachment to rock at a single central point. The generic name derives from the Latin umbilicus ('navel'), with the suffix –aria ('possession or connection'), referring to this navel-like holdfast. Although Umbilicaria was later found to be a later homonym of an earlier plant-genus name, it was conserved under the International Code of Nomenclature for algae, fungi, and plants, with U. hyperborea as the conserved type.

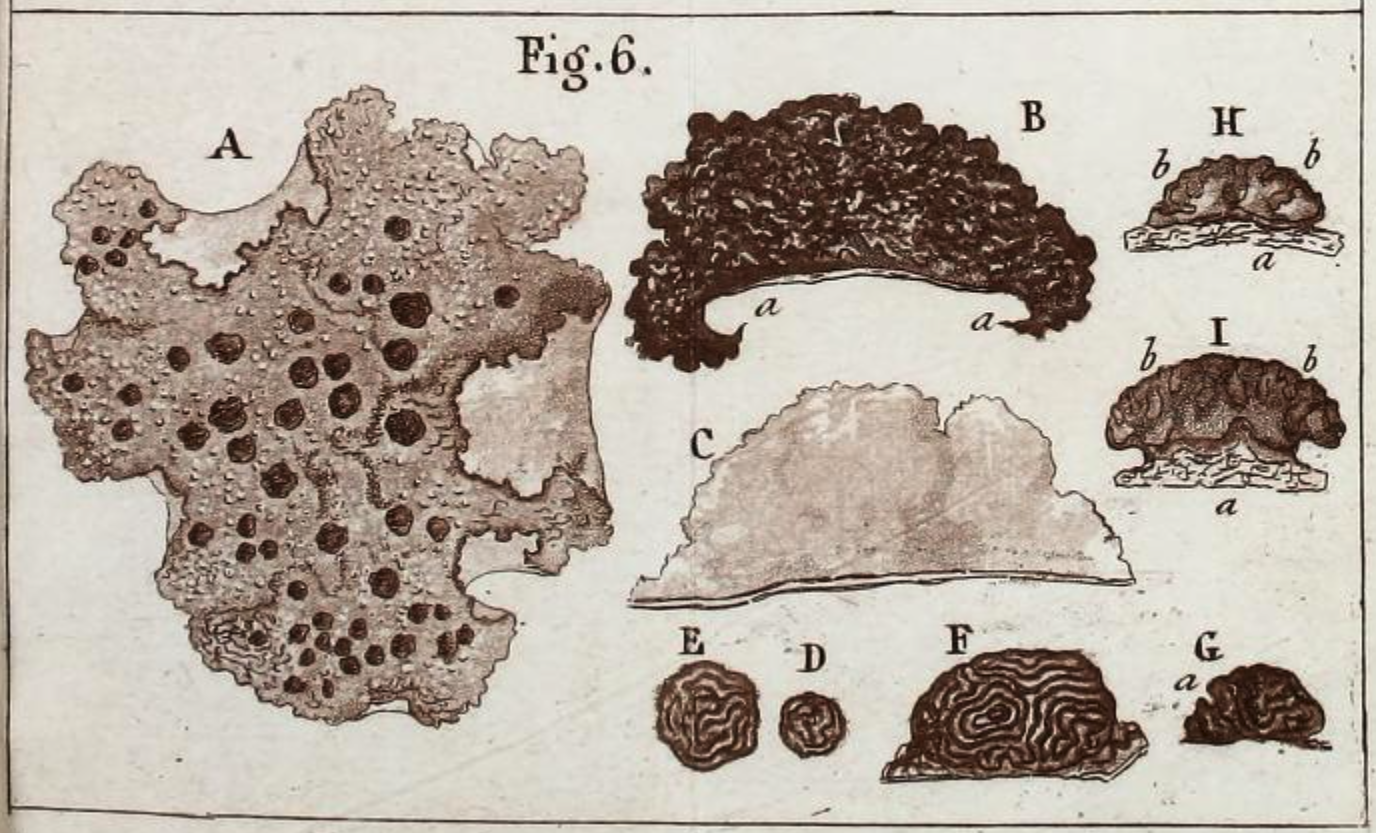
From Erik Acharius's 1803 work Methodus qua omnes detectos lichenes, showing thalli and apothecia of Gyrophora arctica (now Umbilicaria arctica) in surface and profile views, illustrating the fruiting-body characters he used to distinguish genera.

For much of its history, the genus was delimited chiefly by morphology. Traditional authors relied on features such as the foliose thallus, the central umbilicus, rhizinomorphs, the form of the black apothecia, and later the presence of thalloconidia. Classification was not entirely stable: Gyrophora was often treated as an infrageneric name within Umbilicaria, and some authors proposed dividing the genus more sharply on apothecial characters. Later workers treated such schemes with caution, however, and the growing taxonomic importance attached to thalloconidia led to a broad reassessment of species limits and name application.

In current classifications the genus is placed in the family Umbilicariaceae, and modern systematic work has shifted the emphasis from gross morphology alone to molecular evidence. Phylogenetic studies have supported Umbilicariaceae in the strict sense (sensu stricto) as a monophyletic group and recovered several major clades within the traditional Umbilicaria complex, including a "core Umbilicaria" clade and lineages corresponding to the historical names Agyrophora and Gyrophora. On that basis, Davydov and co-authors in 2017 proposed a broad classification in which the principal diversity of the family is treated as a single genus, Umbilicaria, divided into eight subgenera.

That broad single-genus treatment has not been followed uniformly, and some recent authors continue to recognize multiple genera within Umbilicariaceae. Published estimates of the number of accepted Umbilicaria species also vary: modern syntheses generally place the genus at about 70–80 species worldwide, while broader family-level summaries reflect continuing debate over circumscription. Molecular studies have also indicated that some named taxa may be non-monophyletic or more variable than earlier morphology-based classifications suggested, so both species limits and generic boundaries remain under review.

== Description ==
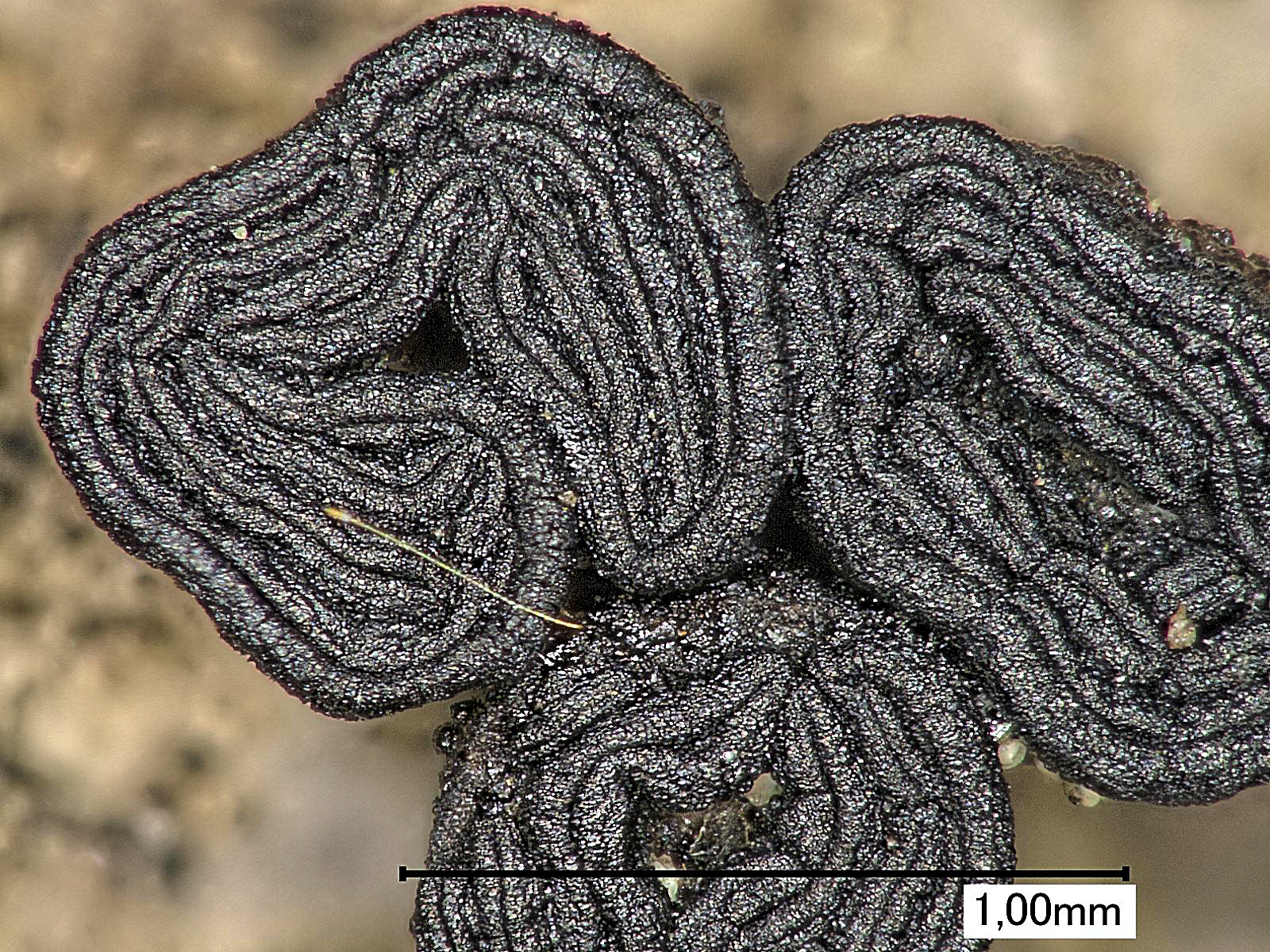
Closeup of the gyrose apothecia (fruiting bodies) of Umbilicaria cylindrica

Species in Umbilicaria have a foliose, dorsiventral thallus — a leafy body with distinct upper and lower surfaces — that is attached to the substrate at a single central or sometimes off-centre point, producing the characteristic umbilicate (navel-like) form. When moist, the thallus is usually soft, pliable, and somewhat leathery, but it often becomes brittle on drying. The upper surface ranges from pale grey-brown to black and may be smooth, cracked, warted, folded, or marked by a net-like pattern of ridges, sometimes with a raised central area. The margins are wavy and may be entire (unbroken) or incised (deeply cut). The lower surface is smooth or warted and is sometimes pitted, rarely bearing lamellae (thin plate-like ridges); it is usually black, but in some species may be pale brownish-pink. Rhizinomorphs (root-like strands) may be present or absent on the lower surface, but they do not function in attachment to the substrate. Some species also produce isidia or soredia, structures used for vegetative reproduction. In certain taxa, the upper cortex is covered by a broad, short-lived epinecral layer — a thin surface film of dead cells. The photobiont is a chlorococcoid green alga, forming either a continuous layer or discrete colonies, while the medulla (inner tissue) may be loose or compact and is not always sharply distinct from the lower cortex.

The fruiting bodies are apothecia (open, disc-shaped reproductive structures), which may be immersed in the thallus, sessile (sitting directly on the surface), or stalked, and are often irregular in outline. Their discs are black and may be flat or convex, most commonly gyrose (with ridged, maze-like folds), ring-like, or radiating, though occasionally smooth; in some cases they bear a central sterile umbo (a small raised boss). A thick thalline margin — a rim of tissue continuous with the thallus — is usually present and may be black or dark brown, although it is lacking in some species. Internally, the hymenium (spore-producing layer) is 60–90 μm thick, with branched, septate paraphyses (sterile filaments among the spore sacs) that are hyaline or brown and often have swollen, pigmented terminal cells. The hypothecium (tissue beneath the hymenium) is thick and brown to blackish. The asci (spore-bearing sacs) are elongate-clavate (narrowly club-shaped), thick-walled, eight-spored, and of the Umbilicaria type, with an apical dome that reacts K/I+ blue (that is, staining blue when pre-treated with potassium hydroxide and then iodine). Ascospores may be colourless, ellipsoidal, and aseptate (without internal partitions), or muriform (divided by both longitudinal and transverse walls) and later becoming brown.

The pycnidia (asexual fruiting bodies) are uni- or multiloculate, and their conidiophores (spore-bearing stalks) are sometimes branched, with conidiogenous loci formed terminally or just below the septa. The conidia (asexual spores) are short, cylindrical, or slightly curved. In species that lack isidia and soredia and only rarely produce apothecia, thalloconidia may occur on the lower cortex or on rhizinomorphs; these are either single-celled or composed of several cells.

== Chemistry ==
Many species of Umbilicaria produce secondary metabolites belonging mainly to the orcinol-derived depside, tridepside, and β-orcinol depsidone groups. In a broad high-performance liquid chromatography survey of 33 species, gyrophoric acid was detected in 31 and was described as the characteristic lichen substance of the genus, while lecanoric acid and umbilicaric acid were also frequent. Chemistry can help separate some species, but its taxonomic value is uneven and is usually strongest when used alongside morphology rather than on its own. Intraspecific variation in lichen substances has also been documented, so chemically defined forms do not always correspond neatly to species boundaries.

== Reproduction and dispersal ==
Umbilicaria reproduces both sexually and asexually. Sexual reproduction is by apothecia producing ascospores, and the genus also forms pycnidia that produce conidia. Asexual reproduction often involves thalloconidia, which are fungal propagules produced from the lower cortex or on rhizinomorphs, while some species instead produce lichenized propagules such as isidia or soredia.

Thalloconidia have long been important in the classification of Umbilicaria and can be informative at the species level. Across Umbilicariaceae, species with thalloconidia tend to produce lichenized propagules less often, and many also form apothecia only rarely, suggesting partial substitution among dispersal strategies. Because thalloconidia do not contain the photobiont, establishment from them, like establishment from ascospores, still requires acquisition of a compatible algal partner.

Studies of a few species suggest that Umbilicaria species that reproduce mainly by ascospores may associate with a broader range of Trebouxia partners than mainly vegetative species, although this pattern has not yet been demonstrated across Umbilicaria as a whole. Field work on glacier forelands has also found that sexually reproducing species can be especially effective colonizers of newly exposed rock, whereas detached thallus fragments appear to play a smaller role in establishment in at least some alpine species.

== Habitat and distribution ==
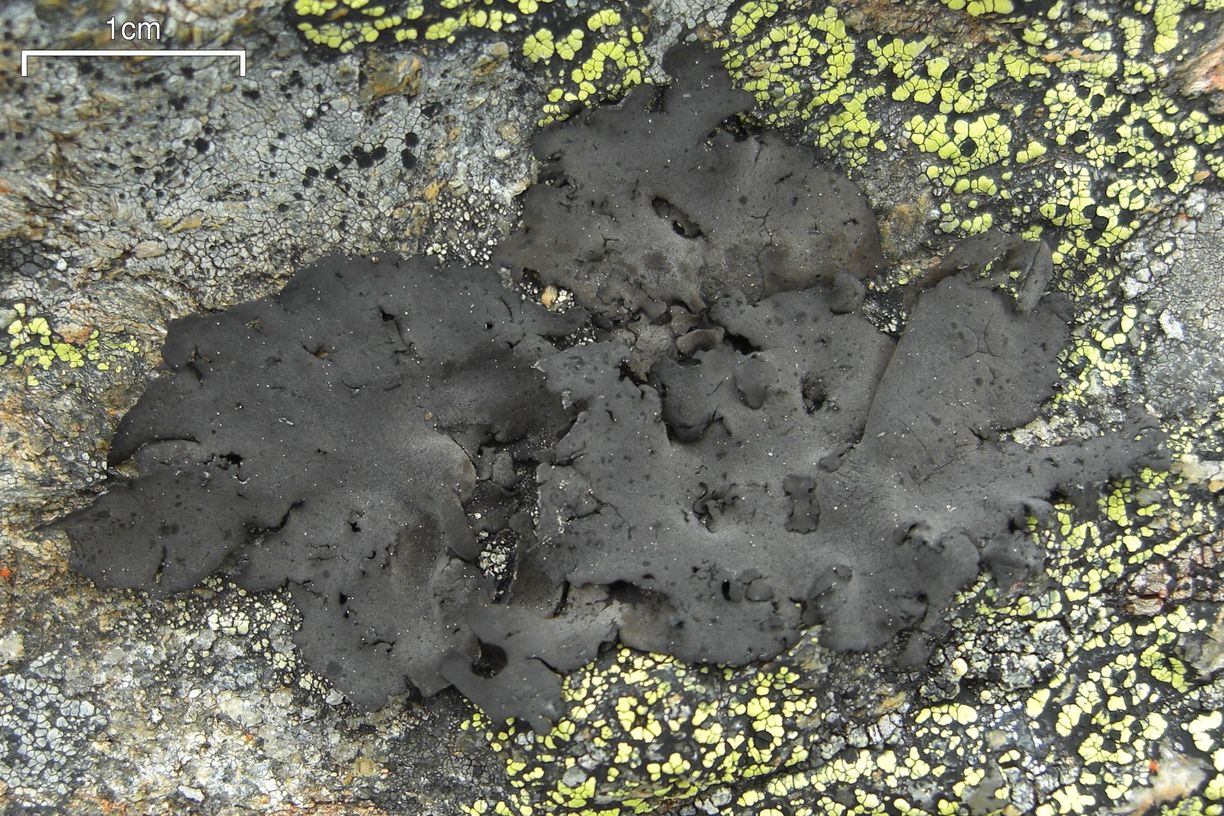
Umbilicaria leiocarpa growing amongst a community of rock-dwelling lichens in Wells Gray Park, British Columbia

Species of Umbilicaria are mostly saxicolous (rock-dwelling) lichens that grow chiefly on exposed rock surfaces in cold climates, and they are especially characteristic of cool-temperate, boreal, alpine, and polar environments. Most occur on siliceous, usually acidic rock rather than calcareous substrates. Although the genus is overwhelmingly rock-dwelling, rare departures from this pattern have been reported. Regional floras record species on boulders, scree, rock walls, cliffs, and other long-exposed outcrops. In tropical regions, Umbilicaria is largely confined to open high-mountain habitats above the tree line, where suitable sunlit rock is available.

The genus has a worldwide distribution and is a major component of saxicolous lichen floras in boreal and alpine regions. Modern syntheses indicate that diversity is greatest in the Northern Hemisphere, while occurrences in the mid-latitude Southern Hemisphere are more geographically restricted. Umbilicaria is nevertheless well represented in some Southern Hemisphere mountain systems and in Antarctica. In maritime Antarctica it can be widespread and locally abundant on stable acidic rock, but is less frequent on sites exposed to strong wind and sea spray.

Biogeographic patterns within the genus combine broad-ranging cold-climate species with narrower regional endemics. Molecular work in the central Andes has identified an endemic Umbilicaria element that dominates part of the alpine to subalpine elevational range there. Several species are circumpolar or bipolar in distribution, and long-distance dispersal has been proposed as an explanation for at least some of these disjunct ranges.

== Ecology ==
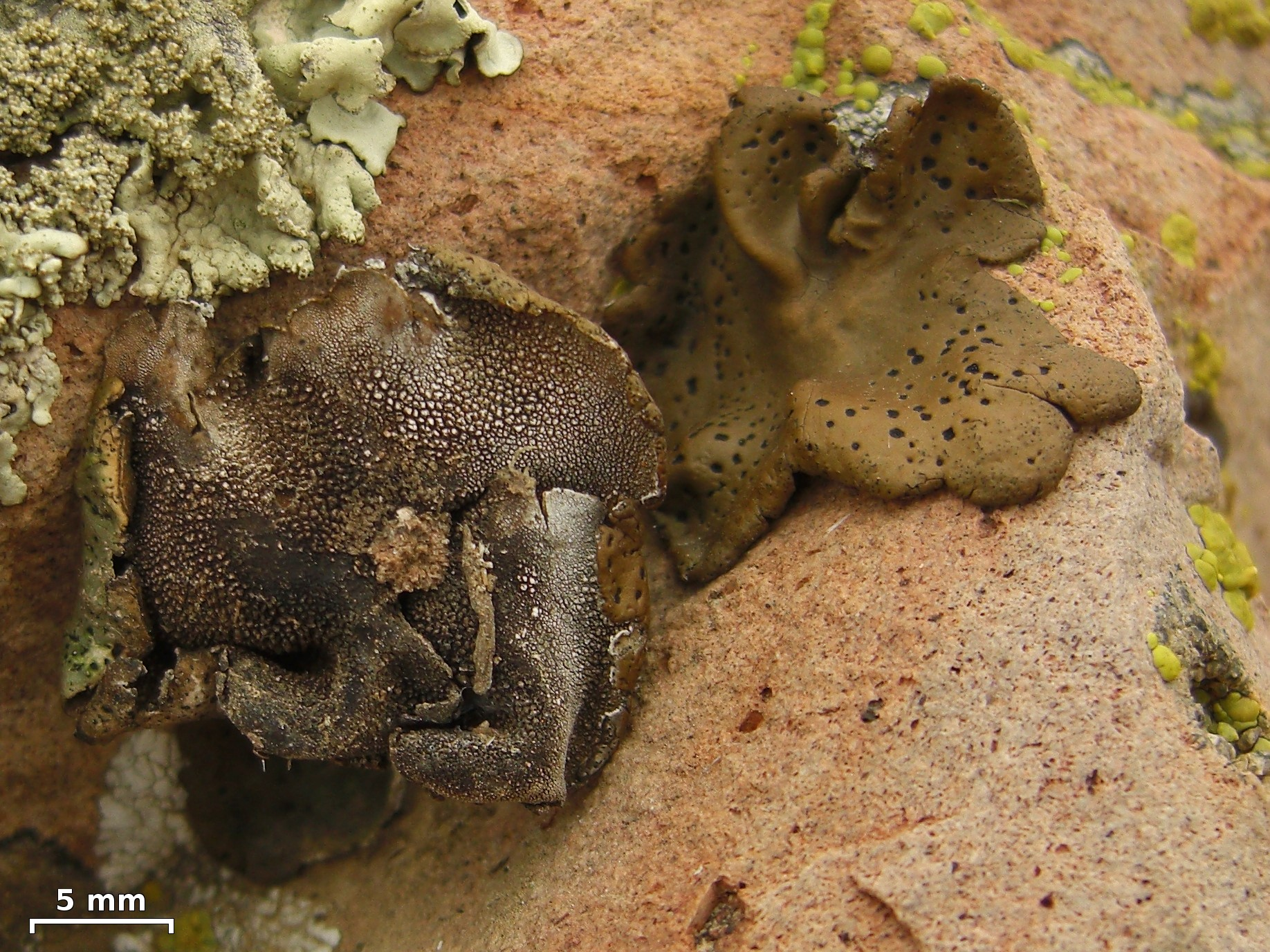
Umbilicaria phaea on Conejo Mountain, southern California

Umbilicaria species form lichens with green algal photobionts, most commonly members of the genus Trebouxia. Studies of co-occurring species show that photobiont specificity can be relatively low in some systems. Comparative work on U. esculenta and U. muehlenbergii further suggests that reproductive strategy helps shape how narrowly or broadly species associate with algal partners. Hestmark and co-workers reported that about one third of Umbilicaria species reproduce mainly by thalloconidia, which are strictly fungal propagules produced from the lower cortex. Differences in reproductive mode therefore seem to influence dispersal and the establishment of new fungal-algal partnerships within the genus.

Many species occupy physically severe environments and have been studied for their ability to survive freezing and resume activity after rehydration. In one experiment, five Umbilicaria species resumed gas exchange after ten years of storage at −20 °C, although recovery differed among species and hydration states. In U. aprina, net photosynthesis has been recorded at subzero temperatures after rehydration from snow, showing that at least some Antarctic species can remain metabolically active below 0 °C. Water-storage capacity also varies with thallus anatomy, especially medullary structure, which helps explain differences in hydration behaviour among species.

Members of the genus are also important pioneers on newly exposed rock surfaces. A 240-year glacier foreland study in Norway found that four alpine species grew slowly—roughly 0.9 to 2.4 mm per year in radial growth—and typically required about 50–80 years from establishment to first reproduction. Young volcanic lava can likewise be colonized by Umbilicaria, as shown for U. krascheninnikovii on twentieth-century lava flows in Kamchatka. In maritime Antarctica, propagules appear to be dispersed mainly by wind, although fragments of Umbilicaria have also been found in skua and seabird nests.

== Human uses ==
Several species of Umbilicaria are eaten by humans and are collectively known in English as rock tripe. In North America, rock tripe was chiefly a fallback or famine food used by Cree, Inuit, Chipewyan, and other Indigenous peoples, and was later eaten by explorers and voyageurs during periods of severe shortage. In East Asia, by contrast, Umbilicaria esculenta has long been eaten in Japan, Korea, and China as a valued food in its own right. Rock tripe usually requires soaking and repeated boiling before consumption, and the very slow growth of Umbilicaria lichens has limited any large-scale harvesting.

== Species ==
Published estimates of the number of Umbilicaria species vary, in part because authors differ over the circumscription of the genus within Umbilicariaceae. As of April 2026, the Catalogue of Life includes 115 species in the genus.

- Umbilicaria africana (Jatta) Krog & Swinscow (1986)
- Umbilicaria ahtii Davydov (2024)
- Umbilicaria altaiensis J.C.Wei & Y.M.Jiang (1992) – China
- Umbilicaria americana Poelt & T.H.Nash (1993)
- Umbilicaria angulata Tuck. (1848)
- Umbilicaria antarctica Frey & I.M.Lamb (1939)
- Umbilicaria aprina Nyl. (1869)
- Umbilicaria arctica (Ach.) Nyl. (1859)
- Umbilicaria bigleri Frey (1949)
- Umbilicaria brachyrhizinata J.C.Wei (2024)
- Umbilicaria calvescens Nyl. (1861) – Bolivia
- Umbilicaria capitata J.C.Wei (2024)
- Umbilicaria chimobrazoensis J.C.Wei (2024)
- Umbilicaria cinerascens (Nyl.) Nyl. (1869)
- Umbilicaria coriacea Imshaug (1957)
- Umbilicaria cristata C.W.Dodge & G.E.Baker (1938)
- Umbilicaria crustulosa (Ach.) Lamy (1879)
- Umbilicaria cylindrica (L.) Delise (1830)
- Umbilicaria dactylorhizinarum J.C.Wei (2024)
- Umbilicaria daliensis (J.C.Wei) Davydov, Peršoh & Rambold (2018)
- Umbilicaria decussata (Vill.) Zahlbr. (1932)
- Umbilicaria dendrophora (Poelt) Hestmark (1993)
- Umbilicaria deusta (L.) Baumg. (1790)
- Umbilicaria dichroa Nyl. (1855)
- Umbilicaria dura McCune (2018) – North America
- Umbilicaria esculenta (Miyoshi) Minks (1900)
- Umbilicaria fasciculata J.C.Wei & L.S.Wang (2024)
- Umbilicaria fokiensis G.Merr. ex Llano (1950)
- Umbilicaria fragilis J.C.Wei (2024)
- Umbilicaria freyi Codogno, Poelt & Puntillo (1989)
- Umbilicaria fructiglomerata J.C.Wei (2024)
- Umbilicaria fructigyrosa J.C.Wei (2024)
- Umbilicaria haplocarpa Nyl. (1859) – Peru
- Umbilicaria hengduanensis J.C.Wei & Li S.Wang (2024)
- Umbilicaria hirsuta (Sw. ex Westr.) Ach. (1794)
- Umbilicaria hispanica (Frey) Davydov, Peršoh & Rambold (2018)
- Umbilicaria hyperborea (Ach.) Hoffm. (1796)
- Umbilicaria hypococcinea (Jatta) Llano (1950)
- Umbilicaria hypoleuca J.C.Wei (2024)
- Umbilicaria iberica Sancho & Krzew. (2009)
- Umbilicaria isidiosa Krzew. (2009)
- Umbilicaria josiae Frey (1936)
- Umbilicaria kangdingensis J.C.Wei (2024)
- Umbilicaria kashiwadanii J.C.Wei (2024)
- Umbilicaria kisovana (Zahlbr. ex Asahina) Zahlbr. (1940)
- Umbilicaria koidzumii M.Satô (1935)
- Umbilicaria krempelhuberi Müll.Arg. (1889)
- Umbilicaria laevis Pers. (1810)
- Umbilicaria lambii Imshaug (1957)
- Umbilicaria lecanorocarpa Kremp. (1876)
- Umbilicaria leiocarpa DC. (1805)
- Umbilicaria loboperipherica J.C.Wei, Y.M.Jiang & S.Y.Guo (1996)
- Umbilicaria lyngei Schol. (1934)
- Umbilicaria maculata Krzew., M.P.Martín & M.A.García (2009)
- Umbilicaria mammulata (Ach.) Tuck. (1848)
- Umbilicaria mahuana J.C.Wei (2024)
- Umbilicaria marginodentata J.C.Wei (2024)
- Umbilicaria meizospora (Harm.) E.A.Davydov & D.Masson (2022) – Europe
- Umbilicaria melanoperipherica J.C.Wei (2024)
- Umbilicaria microphylloides JA.Massal. (1931)
- Umbilicaria mifafensis V.Marcano & A.Morales (1994)
- Umbilicaria minuta J.C.Wei & Y.M.Jiang (1993)
- Umbilicaria muhlenbergii (Ach.) Tuck. (1845)
- Umbilicaria multistrata McCune (2018) – North America
- Umbilicaria murigrisea J.C.Wei (2024)
- Umbilicaria murihikuana D.J.Galloway & Sancho (2005)
- Umbilicaria nigrifacta J.C.Wei (2024)
- Umbilicaria nodulospora McCune, Di Meglio & M.J.Curtis (2014)
- Umbilicaria nyalamii Y.Y.Wang & X.L.Wei (2025)
- Umbilicaria nylanderiana (Zahlbr.) H.Magn. (1937)
- Umbilicaria orientalis Davydov (2020) – East Asia
- Umbilicaria parvisingularis J.C.Wei (2024)
- Umbilicaria pateriformis C.W.Dodge & G.E.Baker (1938)
- Umbilicaria peltiformis J.C.Wei (2024)
- Umbilicaria peruviana Llano (1950)
- Umbilicaria peruvianoides J.C.Wei (2024)
- Umbilicaria phaea Tuck. (1869)
- Umbilicaria platyrhiza Davydov (2022)
- Umbilicaria polymicrolobarum J.C.Wei (2024)
- Umbilicaria polymicropeltata J.C.Wei (2024)
- Umbilicaria polyphylla (L.) Baumg. (1790)
- Umbilicaria polyrhizos (L.) Stenh. (1825)
- Umbilicaria polyrrhiza (L.) Fr. (1825)
- Umbilicaria proboscidea (L.) Schrad. (1794)
- Umbilicaria propagulifera (Vain.) Lano (1950)
- Umbilicaria pseudocinerascens J.C.Wei & Y.M.Jiang (1988)
- Umbilicaria pseudoperuvianoides J.C.Wei (2024)
- Umbilicaria pulvinaria (Savicz) Frey (1931)
- Umbilicaria pulviniformis J.C.Wei & Li S.Wang (2024)
- Umbilicaria radicifasciculata J.C.Wei (2024)
- Umbilicaria reticulaporcata J.C.Wei (2024)
- Umbilicaria rhizinata (Frey & Poelt) Krzew. (2010)
- Umbilicaria rhizoperipheria J.C.Wei (2024)
- Umbilicaria rhizophora J.C.Wei & Q.Ren (2024)
- Umbilicaria rigida (Du Rietz) Frey (1931)
- Umbilicaria rimosa J.C.Wei (2024)
- Umbilicaria robusta (Llano) D.J.Galloway & Sancho (2005)
- Umbilicaria roseola J.C.Wei (2024)
- Umbilicaria rugiformis J.C.Wei (2024)
- Umbilicaria schaereri J.C.Wei (2024)
- Umbilicaria squamosa J.C.Wei & Y.M.Jiang (1992)
- Umbilicaria sinorientalis (J.C.Wei) Davydov, Peršoh & Rambold (2018)
- Umbilicaria spodochroa Ehrh. ex Hoffm. (1796)
- Umbilicaria subcalvescens Sipman (1992) – Colombia
- Umbilicaria subglabra (Nyl.) Harm. (1910)
- Umbilicaria subkisovana J.C.Wei (2024)
- Umbilicaria subumbilicarioides J.C.Wei & Y.M.Jiang (1992)
- Umbilicaria taibaiensis J.C.Wei & Y.M.Jiang (1992)
- Umbilicaria thamnodes Hue (1900)
- Umbilicaria torrefacta (Lightf.) Schrad. (1794)
- Umbilicaria undata J.C.Wei (2024)
- Umbilicaria varia Leight. (1856)
- Umbilicaria vellea (L.) Ach. (1794)
- Umbilicaria vermireticulata J.C.Wei (2024)
- Umbilicaria viperina Llano (1950)
- Umbilicaria virginis Schaer. (1842)
- Umbilicaria xizangensis (J.C.Wei & Y.M.Jiang) Davydov, Peršoh & Rambold (2018)
- Umbilicaria zhumulangmaensis J.C.Wei (2024)
