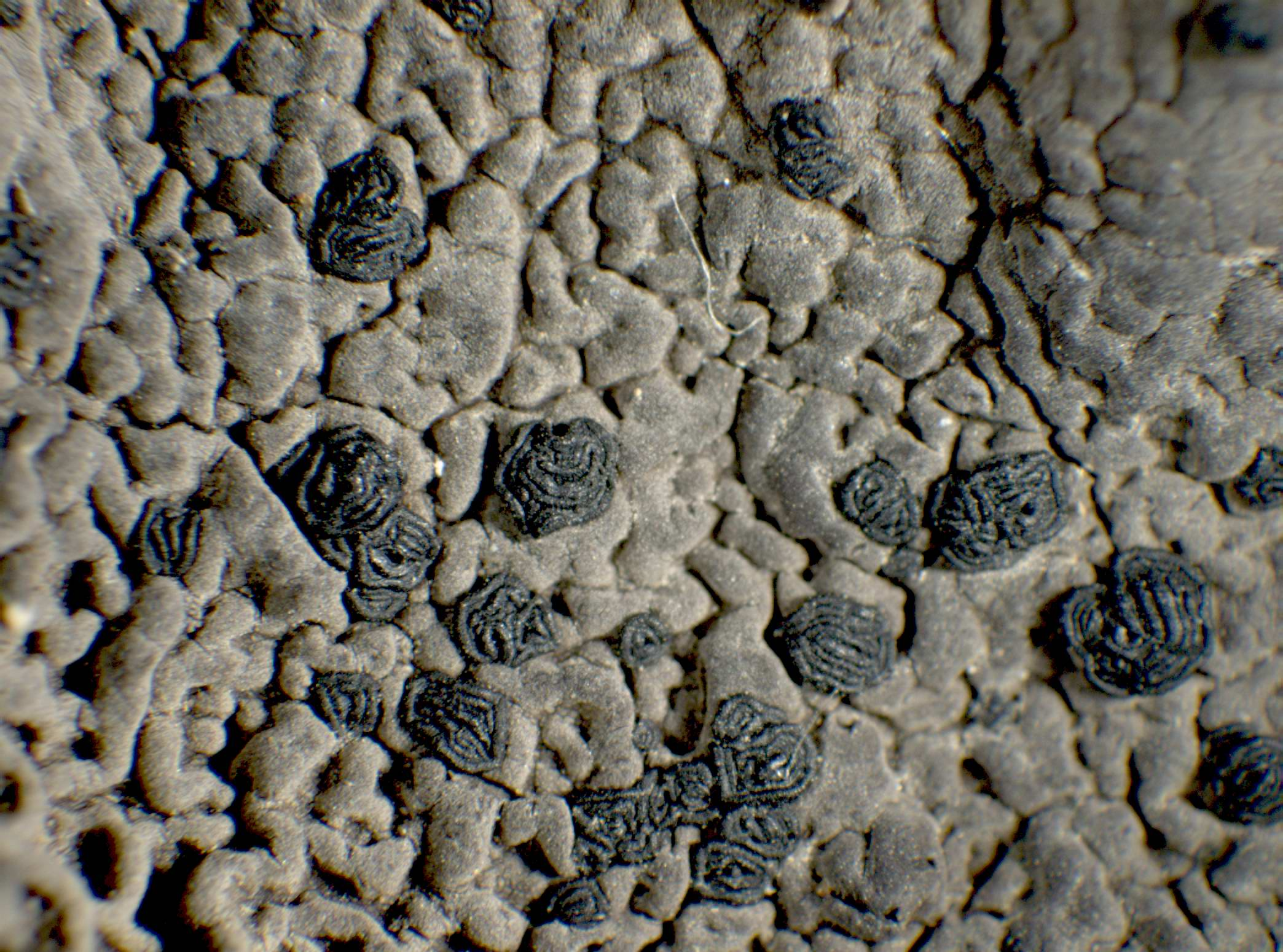
- details of upper thallus surface with apothecia

Conservation status
- Secure (NatureServe)

Scientific classification
- Kingdom: Fungi
- Division: Ascomycota
- Class: Lecanoromycetes
- Order: Umbilicariales
- Family: Umbilicariaceae
- Genus: Umbilicaria
- Species: U. nylanderiana

Binomial name
- Umbilicaria nylanderiana (Zahlbr.) H.Magn. (1937)

Synonyms
- Umbilicaria corrugata Nyl. (1861); Gyrophora corrugata Arnold (1875); Gyrophora nylanderiana Zahlbr. (1927)

= Umbilicaria nylanderiana =

Species of lichen

Umbilicaria nylanderiana is a species of foliose lichen in the family Umbilicariaceae. It typically appears as a single, rigid disc attached to rock surfaces. First described in 1927, it can grow up to 6 cm (2.4 in) across and is characterised by its dark brown to grey upper surface with dense, rounded ridges, and a black lower surface. The species is found worldwide on boulders and cliffs in alpine regions, including Europe, North and South America, and parts of maritime Antarctica. It can be distinguished from similar-looking species by its production of specialised reproductive structures called thalloconidia, which appear as dark oval cells covering most of its lower surface.

== Taxonomy ==
Initially described as Gyrophora nylanderiana by Alexander Zahlbruckner in 1927, it was named after Finnish botanist and lichenologist William Nylander. The species was reassigned to the genus Umbilicaria by Adolf Hugo Magnusson in 1937. Closely related to Umbilicaria arctica, Umbilicaria nylanderiana has often been confused with Umbilicaria hyperborea. However, it is distinguishable by its production of thalloconidia, which the latter lacks. Molecular analyses have confirmed the identity of Andean specimens as Umbilicaria nylanderiana, aligning them with the European populations of the species.

== Description ==
The thallus of Umbilicaria nylanderiana is typically monophyllous (having single lobe), rigid, and brittle, often with lacerated margins, although it can sometimes be polyphyllous (multi-lobed), particularly in wind-exposed habitats. It usually measures up to 6 cm (2.4 in) across, but Antarctic specimens are considerably smaller, growing to about 2 cm in diameter. The upper thallus surface is dark brown to grey, characterised by densely packed, high, rounded ridges, while the lower surface is black and smooth.

Reproductive features of the lichen include black, adnate, and gyrose apothecia (fruiting bodies), which are more common in Neotropic specimens and rarer in European samples. Asci (spore-bearing cells) are club shaped (clavate). Ascospores typically number eight per ascus, ranging from unicellular to multicellular, and are hyaline or brown, measuring 7–16 by 5–9 μm. The thalloconidia are unicellular, dark brown to black, and oval or ellipsoid, typically covering the entire lower surface except at the peripheral areas.

== Habitat and distribution ==
Umbilicaria nylanderiana is primarily found on the vertical to horizontal faces of large boulders or cliffs in the alpine zone, frequently above the snow line in winter. Its distribution is global, occurring throughout Europe, North America, and South America. This species is the only common brown Umbilicaria in Ecuador and occupies ecological niches similar to those of several brown species in North America, Europe, and Asia, such as U. hyperborea, U. deusta, and U. arctica.

In Antarctica, its distribution is restricted to the maritime Antarctic region, ranging from the South Orkney Islands in the north to as far south as 68°S along the west coast of the Antarctic Peninsula and its offshore islands. In this region, it is found only in coastal sites at elevations between 5 and 200 m (16 and 656 ft) above sea level, often on north-facing volcanic rocks. While generally rare in Antarctica, it can be locally abundant in some environments.
