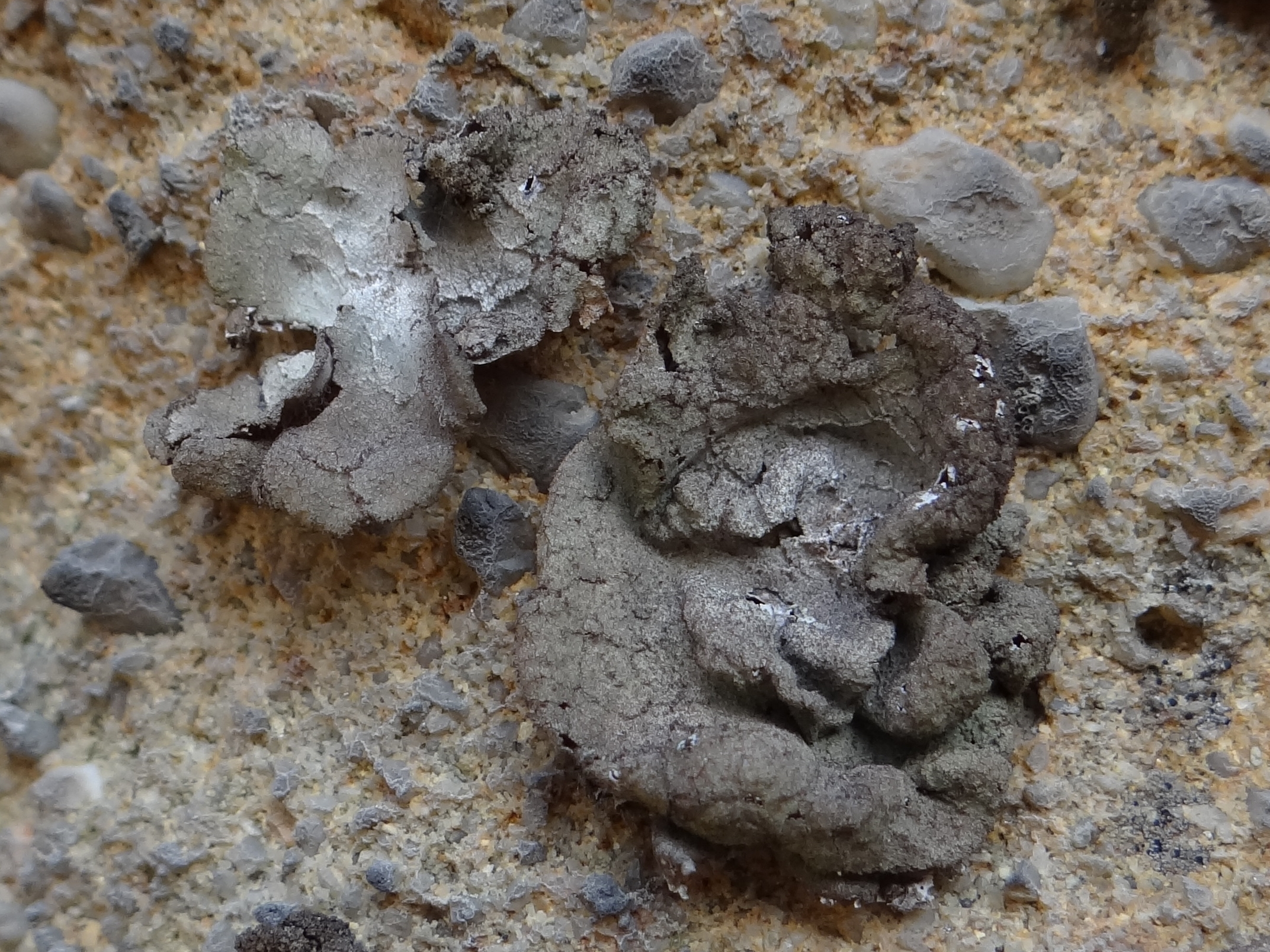
- Mature thalli growing on rock

Scientific classification
- Kingdom: Fungi
- Division: Ascomycota
- Class: Lecanoromycetes
- Order: Umbilicariales
- Family: Umbilicariaceae
- Genus: Umbilicaria
- Species: U. hirsuta

Binomial name
- Umbilicaria hirsuta (Sw. ex Westr.) Ach. (1794)

Synonyms
- List: Lichen hirsutus Sw. ex Westr. (1793); Gyrophora hirsuta (Sw. ex Westr.) Ach. (1803); Gyrophora depressa var. hirsuta (Sw. ex Westr.) Schaer. (1817); Gyromium velleum var. hirsutum (Sw. ex Westr.) Wahlenb. (1826); Umbilicaria depressa var. hirsuta (Sw. ex Westr.) Schaer. (1826); Lecidea hirsuta (Sw. ex Westr.) Spreng. (1827); Umbilicaria vellea var. hirsuta (Sw. ex Westr.) Fr. (1831); Umbilicaria grisea var. hirsuta (Sw. ex Westr.) F.Desp. (1838); Gyrophora vellea var. hirsuta (Sw. ex Westr.) Rabenh. (1845); Gyrophora spodochroa f. hirsuta (Sw. ex Westr.) Arnold (1878); Lichen griseus Sw. ex Westr. (1793); Umbilicaria grisea Hoffm. (1796); Lichen murinus Ach. (1799); Gyrophora grisea (Hoffm.) Sw. ex Westr. (1819); Umbilicaria vellea f. grisea (Hoffm.) Schaer. (1850); Umbilicaria varia var. grisea (Hoffm.) Leight. (1856); Gyrophora hirsuta var. grisea (Hoffm.) Th.Fr. (1871); Umbilicaria murina f. grisea (Hoffm.) Lamy (1880); Umbilicaria hirsuta var. grisea (Hoffm.) Tuck. (1882); Gyrophora hirsuta f. grisea (Hoffm.) Bachm. (1914); Gyrophora murina (Ach.) Ach. (1803); Umbilicaria murina (Ach.) DC. (1805); Gyrophora hirsuta var. murina (Ach.) Flörke (1810); Gyrophora depressa f. murina (Ach.) Schaer. (1817); Gyromium velleum var. murinum (Ach.) Wahlenb. (1826); Lecidea hirsuta var. murina (Ach.) Spreng. (1827); Umbilicaria depressa var. murina (Ach.) Duby (1830); Umbilicaria vellea f. murina (Ach.) Fr. (1831); Gyrophora hirsuta f. murina (Ach.) Anzi (1860); Umbilicaria vellea var. murina (Ach.) Grognot (1863)

= Umbilicaria hirsuta =

Species of lichen-forming fungus

Umbilicaria hirsuta is a species of rock-dwelling, foliose (leafy) lichen in the family Umbilicariaceae, known in North America as the granular rock tripe. The species was first published in 1793 by Johan Peter Westring, who credited Olof Swartz for the name and noted that the lichen could be used as a dye source. The species was later transferred to the genus Umbilicaria by Erik Acharius. In Europe it has been treated as part of a complex of closely similar taxa, including U. grisea and U. freyi, which differ in thallus anatomy and the type of vegetative propagules they produce.

The thallus is typically 2 to 5 cm (0.8 to 2.0 in) across, grey to brownish grey, and attached to the rock at a single central point; its underside bears dark, root-like rhizinomorphs, and the margins often produce powdery vegetative propagules. The main secondary metabolite is gyrophoric acid, detected by a red reaction with the C spot test. Umbilicaria hirsuta grows on siliceous rock across much of Europe and North America, from the Arctic to Mexico and from the Iberian highlands to the Scottish Highlands, and has also been recorded from Mongolia, but records are scattered and it is seldom common. It tolerates drying and cold; experiments suggest that ribitol helps sustain photosynthesis at sub-zero temperatures, and that the species is sensitive to some pollutants, including fluoranthene.

== Taxonomy ==
The species was first published by Johan Peter Westring as Lichen hirsutus, crediting Olof Swartz for the name, in a paper devoted largely to the dyeing properties of the "umbilicate" lichens. Westring described the group as lichens attached at a single central point and noted that most contained a red colouring matter useful for dyeing. His short account of L. hirsutus described an umbilicate lichen with a lobed, incised margin and a black, hairy underside; he also noted confusion with L. polyrhizos (now Umbilicaria polyrhizos) and reported that the species yielded several shades, including dark violet, puce, and lilac, depending on preparation. Since then, the taxon has acquired an extensive synonymy. Much of this reflects repeated transfer among lichen genera and the historically broad treatment of morphologically similar sorediate Umbilicaria taxa. Apart from a few names later taken up at species rank, most of the entries in the synonymy represent recombinations or infraspecific names published under those broader circumscriptions. One exception is Umbilicaria hirsuta var. meizospora, described by Harmand from France in 1910, which was later reinterpreted as the separate species Umbilicaria meizospora.

In Europe, Umbilicaria hirsuta has often been treated as part of a complex of closely similar taxa. Codogno, Poelt, and Puntillo (1989) recognized three European taxa on the basis of thallus anatomy and the type of vegetative diaspores produced: U. hirsuta in the strict sense, U. grisea (often treated under the name U. murina in older literature), and U. freyi, which they described as new. They also argued that the powdery propagules in this group are not typical medullary soredia but arise by fragmentation of the algal-bearing upper thallus layer, for which they used the term "parasoredia". In their treatment, U. hirsuta usually has abundant parasoredia that may break up into finer granules, together with a generally pale lower surface bearing branched rhizinomorphs and radiating support ridges; U. grisea tends to have fewer, coarser parasoredia and a much darker, often glossy black lower surface, while U. freyi produces schizidia instead of parasoredia.

Another name historically linked with U. hirsuta is the epithet spodochroa, used in U. hirsuta var. spodochroa (Hoffm.) D.Dietr.. In older literature, Umbilicaria spodochroa was often confused with U. hirsuta. Davydov, Ahti, and Sennikov (2020) re-examined the original material and concluded that Hoffmann's U. spodochroa was based on specimens of U. hirsuta, even though the name had long been applied to a different species. Hestmark later proposed conserving Umbilicaria spodochroa with a conserved type and spelling in order to preserve that established usage; without such conservation, the name would fall into synonymy with U. hirsuta. In current usage, Umbilicaria spodochroa is distinguished from U. hirsuta by its omphalodisc apothecia with a prominent central button, whereas U. hirsuta usually reproduces by marginal parasoredia and only rarely forms gyrodisc apothecia. A broader multilocus phylogenetic study of Umbilicariaceae placed Umbilicaria hirsuta in the U. vellea group, within a major clade that also includes U. grisea, U. freyi, and U. spodochroa.

== Description ==
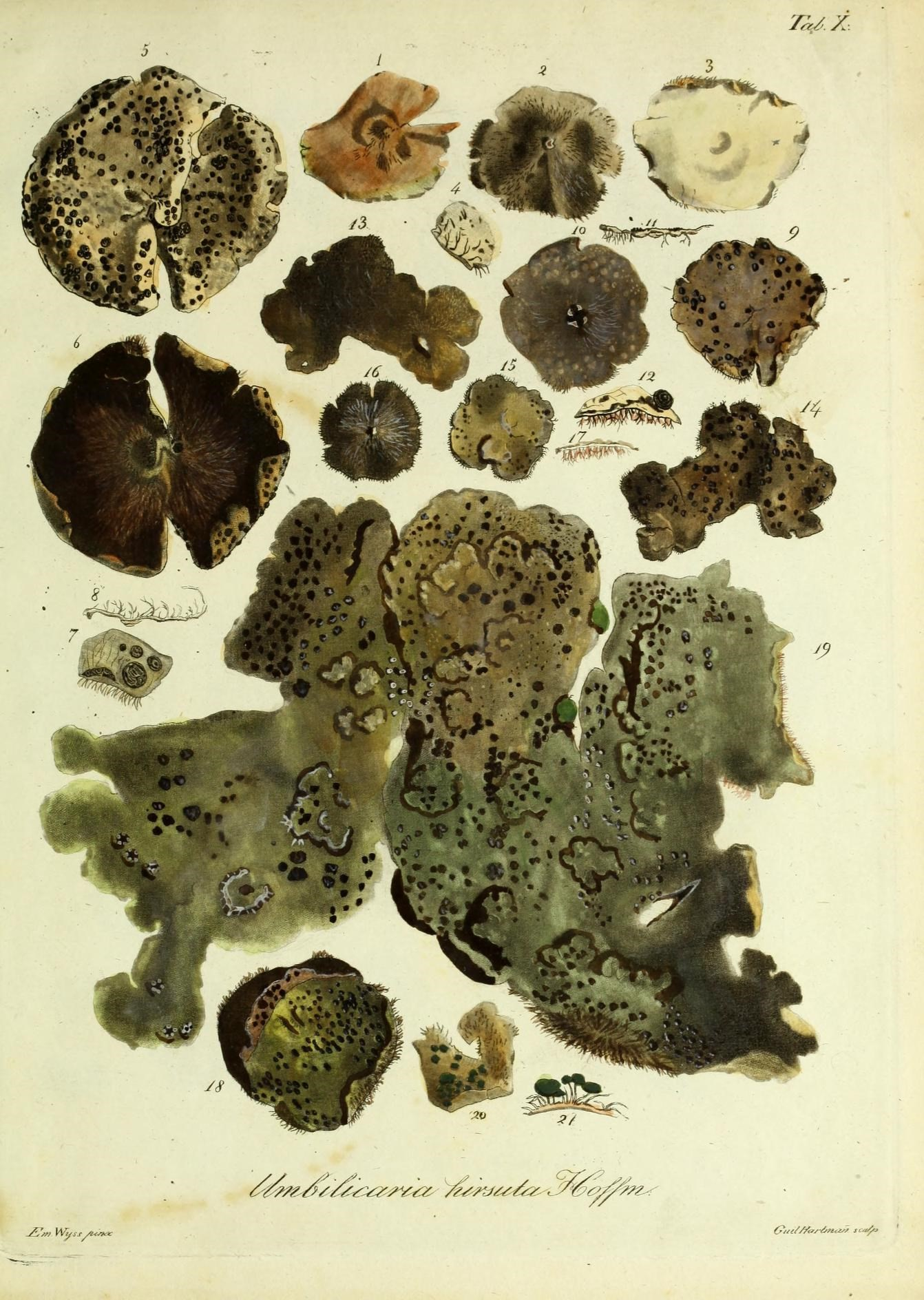
Historical illustration from 1823 showing the thallus form and reproductive structures, with numbered detail figures of different morphologies and surface features.

The thallus of Umbilicaria hirsuta typically spans 2 to 5 cm (0.8 to 2.0 in) across. Thalli may occur singly or in small clusters. The lobe edges often curve downward and may be smooth and rounded or jagged and torn. The upper surface is grey to brownish grey, finely cracked, and often becomes areolate as it breaks down into diffuse powdery propagules near and on the margins. The sparse, powdery to granular vegetative propagules are usually not grouped into discrete soralia and can therefore be easy to overlook. In the European U. hirsuta group these propagules have been interpreted as "parasoredia" because they arise from fragmentation of the algal-bearing upper thallus layer rather than from undifferentiated medulla. The underside of Umbilicaria hirsuta ranges from pale brown to black, generally becoming darker towards the centre. The underside may be smooth or have small wart-like protrusions, and it typically bears numerous dark brown to black, root-like rhizinomorphs.

Fruiting bodies (apothecia) are uncommon. When present, they are small (0.5–2 mm in diameter) and may be slightly depressed or raised on the thallus surface. They are flat but may appear wrinkled or convoluted, and are sometimes encircled by soralia (clusters of soredia). Identification of the lichen can be harder in very young thalli (before diaspores develop) or in overmature or abraded specimens, because the diagnostic propagules may be absent or damaged.

The ascospores of Umbilicaria hirsuta are colourless, lack internal divisions (septa), and measure 10–13 μm long and 3–7 μm wide (occasionally up to 8 μm).

=== Chemistry ===
The upper surface shows no reaction to the standard spot test (K−, KC−, C−, P−), while the medulla is K−, KC+ (red), C+ (red), and P−, reflecting the presence of gyrophoric and lecanoric acids. In Hungarian material examined by high-performance thin-layer chromatography, Umbilicaria hirsuta showed the gyrophoric acid-lecanoric acid combination. The study also noted that U. grisea is distinguished chemically by the presence of umbilicaric acid, which earlier workers reported as absent from U. hirsuta, although the authors found that this compound was difficult to detect reliably with HPTLC alone. HPLC analyses of Iberian material showed that Umbilicaria hirsuta contains gyrophoric acid as its main lichen substance, together with smaller amounts of lecanoric acid, while umbilicaric acid was nearly absent. In this study, the low proportion of umbilicaric acid helped separate U. hirsuta chemically from the related species U. grisea and U. freyi. In addition to its better-known lichen substances, Umbilicaria hirsuta has been reported to contain pustulan, a water-soluble β-(1→6)-linked glucan first isolated from this species and Lasallia pustulata.

=== Similar species ===
In North America, Umbilicaria hirsuta is the only sorediate species of Umbilicaria, making the presence of marginal powdery propagules a particularly useful character when identifying sterile material. Umbilicaria hirsuta may be confused with Umbilicaria virginis, but the latter differs in having apothecia even in small or young thalli; in U. hirsuta, apothecia are rare and usually occur only in larger or older thalli. The apothecia of U. virginis have a plane disc, whereas those of U. hirsuta are gyrose, and U. hirsuta reproduces mainly asexually by soredia.

In Kershaw's British treatment, Umbilicaria hirsuta could also be confused with Umbilicaria murina, another sorediate species. He distinguished U. murina by its thicker, more rigid thallus and dark, papillose-areolate lower surface lacking rhizinomorphs; U. hirsuta, by contrast, often has a slight greenish-grey tinge and a paler, smoother lower surface with rhizinomorphs, usually darker towards the centre.

== Habitat and distribution ==
In North America, Umbilicaria hirsuta is sporadic from the Arctic to Mexico and appears to be rare throughout its range. It grows on non-calcareous rock, especially on sheltered rock faces in forested or semi-open areas, and is rare in the Pacific Northwest. Kofranek and McCune reported the species from Oregon for the first time in 2008, finding it on a non-calcareous igneous rock outcrop in the Siskiyou Mountains, where it grew on vertical rock faces in filtered light under partial forest canopy cover. Later fieldwork in southwestern Oregon found additional populations on very large boulders and rock outcrops at open, high-elevation sites in the Cascade–Siskiyou region, typically on underhangs or along trickle lines; the same study reported collections from northern and central California and summarized several older records from southern California. In Montana, it has been recorded several times beginning with an initial report from Glacier National Park, and more recently from an old fibreglass travel trailer in western Montana, where it colonized the sheltered side alongside other lichen species.

In the Iberian Peninsula, Umbilicaria hirsuta is chiefly a lichen of higher elevations, occurring mainly from the upper supramediterranean belt (the cooler upland zone above the lowland Mediterranean belt) upward, or from the montane belt in the Pyrenees and Cantabrian Mountains. It tends to occupy rock surfaces affected by intermittent runoff from melting snow or rain. Elsewhere in Europe, it has been reported from Papuk Mountain in Croatia, and from Estonia. In parts of Central Europe, Umbilicaria hirsuta is the dominant species of the lichen community Umbilicarietum hirsutae, which develops on sun-exposed, steep to vertical siliceous rock faces, sometimes at sites affected by seepage, chiefly in montane settings. In Britain, Umbilicaria hirsuta occurs on siliceous rock faces and slate roofs, sometimes in crevices and water-seepage channels. Cannon and colleagues described it there as very local, though sometimes abundant where it occurs, and reported it from the Scottish Highlands, north Wales, and parts of England including Shropshire and Devon. The European distribution has been complicated by long-standing confusion with the similar taxa U. grisea and U. freyi; Codogno, Poelt, and Puntillo argued that recognizing U. freyi as distinct helped clarify older records within the U. hirsuta complex. The species has also been reported from Mongolia, near Ulaanbaatar, where it was collected on rock on a south-exposed forest-steppe slope. In that study, its occurrence with Lasallia pustulata was taken to indicate a fragment of the lichen community Umbilicarietum hirsutae on wind-exposed, dry siliceous rock faces. The species has also been recorded from Scoresby Land in central East Greenland, at Mestersvig on rock, representing a northern range extension.

== Ecology ==
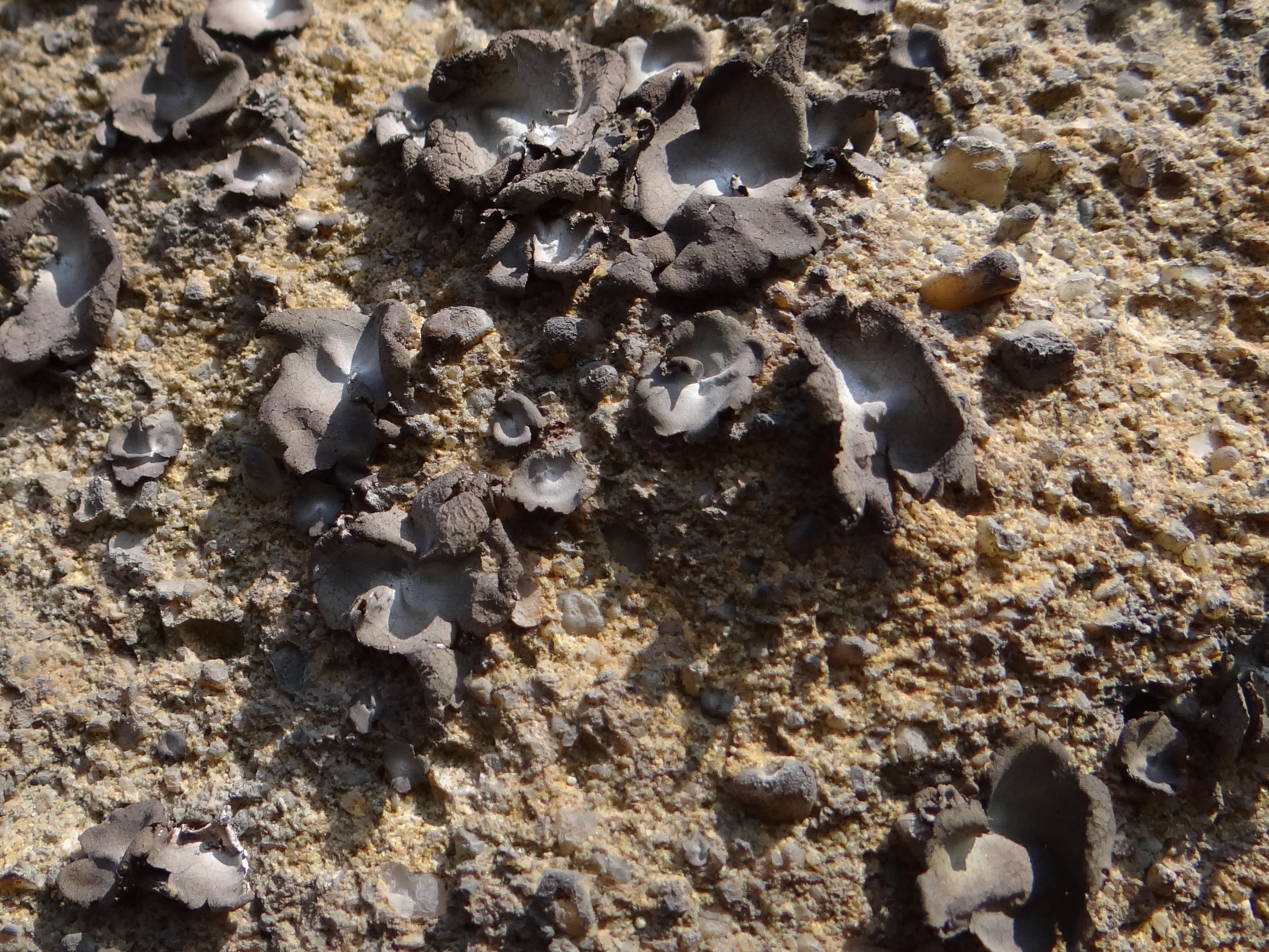
Growing on exposed rock in Ciężkowice, Poland

Umbilicaria hirsuta can survive periods of desiccation (drying out). As the thallus loses water, its spectral reflectance — the way it reflects light — increases across wavelengths, with the largest changes in the visible spectrum. Water-related reflectance indices, including the water index and the normalized difference vegetation index, track changes in thallus water status such as water potential and water saturation deficit. This relationship suggests that remote sensing techniques could be used to monitor how hydrated thalli are in the field without direct sampling. The species can also maintain photosynthesis in cold environments. At low temperatures, photosynthetic electron transport is supported in part by ribitol, a sugar alcohol that acts as a cryoprotective compound — it helps stabilize cellular structures when the thallus dehydrates or freezes. In experiments at −5 °C (23 °F), adding ribitol improved the potential quantum yield of photosystem II (Fv/Fm) and reduced non-photochemical quenching, both signs that the photosynthetic machinery was functioning more efficiently under stress. Together, these traits allow U. hirsuta to remain metabolically active in cold climates, including high mountain and polar regions.

Laboratory exposure experiments suggest sensitivity to some pollutants. Exposure to the polycyclic aromatic hydrocarbon fluoranthene caused changes in chlorophyll fluorescence consistent with inhibition of primary photosynthetic processes; U. hirsuta was more sensitive than Lasallia pustulata under the same treatment conditions, possibly because its relatively large photobiont layer and thallus structure allow greater uptake of the compound. A study of saxicolous Umbilicaria species in southwestern Poland found that thalli accumulated radiocaesium (^{137}Cs) in amounts that increased with altitude, although the authors considered U. hirsuta a less reliable bioindicator of ^{137}Cs than U. cylindrica or U. deusta because its accumulation values were more variable.

Short-term exposure experiments support the characterization of Umbilicaria hirsuta as a calcifuge lichen. In a comparison with the calcicole species Dermatocarpon miniatum, thalli of U. hirsuta accumulated calcium in a dose-dependent manner and showed concentration-dependent declines in chlorophyll fluorescence and soluble protein content under excess calcium, whereas pigment content, ergosterol, and membrane-lipid peroxidation did not change significantly during the 24-hour treatment.

In southwestern Oregon populations, some thalli were found to host the lichenicolous (lichen-dwelling) fungus Arthonia circinata, visible in the field as reddish spots arranged in a concentric pattern on the upper surface. A metabarcoding study of saxicolous lichen communities in Bavaria found no significant short-term change in the fungal community associated with Umbilicaria hirsuta over a six-week spring sampling period; the associated mycobiome was dominated by ascomycetous fungi, especially members of the Lecanoromycetes.
