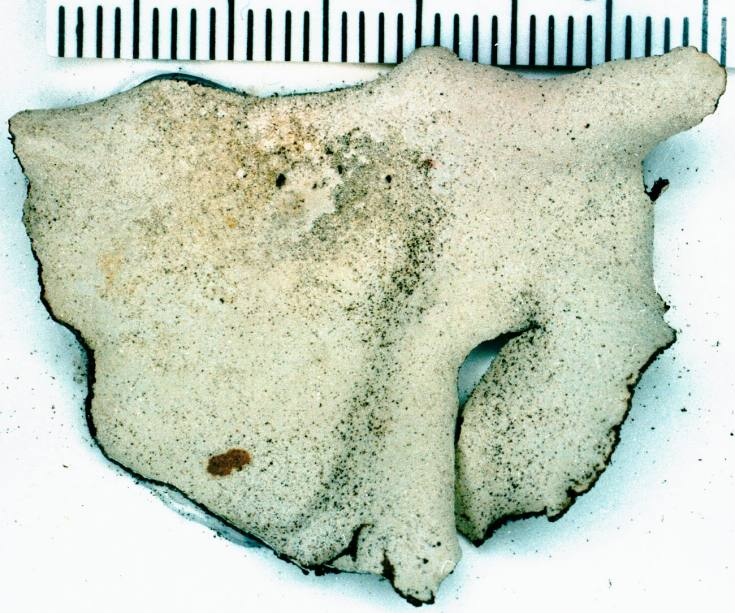
- Herbarium specimen of U. vellea

Conservation status
- Secure (NatureServe)

Scientific classification
- Kingdom: Fungi
- Division: Ascomycota
- Class: Lecanoromycetes
- Order: Umbilicariales
- Family: Umbilicariaceae
- Genus: Umbilicaria
- Species: U. vellea

Binomial name
- Umbilicaria vellea (L.) Hoffm. (1794)

Synonyms
- Lichen velleus L. (1753)

= Umbilicaria vellea =

Species of lichen-forming fungus

Umbilicaria vellea is a species of lichen-forming fungus in the genus Umbilicaria. It is sometimes called navel lichen. It is found in North America and Europe in alpine and arctic habitats. It is similar to the species Umbilicaria americana, which has a more southern distribution.

In Nepal, Umbilicaria vellea has been reported from 3,600 to 5,050 m elevation in a compilation of published records; this reported range extends above the tree line used in the study.

In Iceland, it is found at only one location and is listed as an endangered species (EN).

== See also ==
- List of lichens named by Carl Linnaeus
