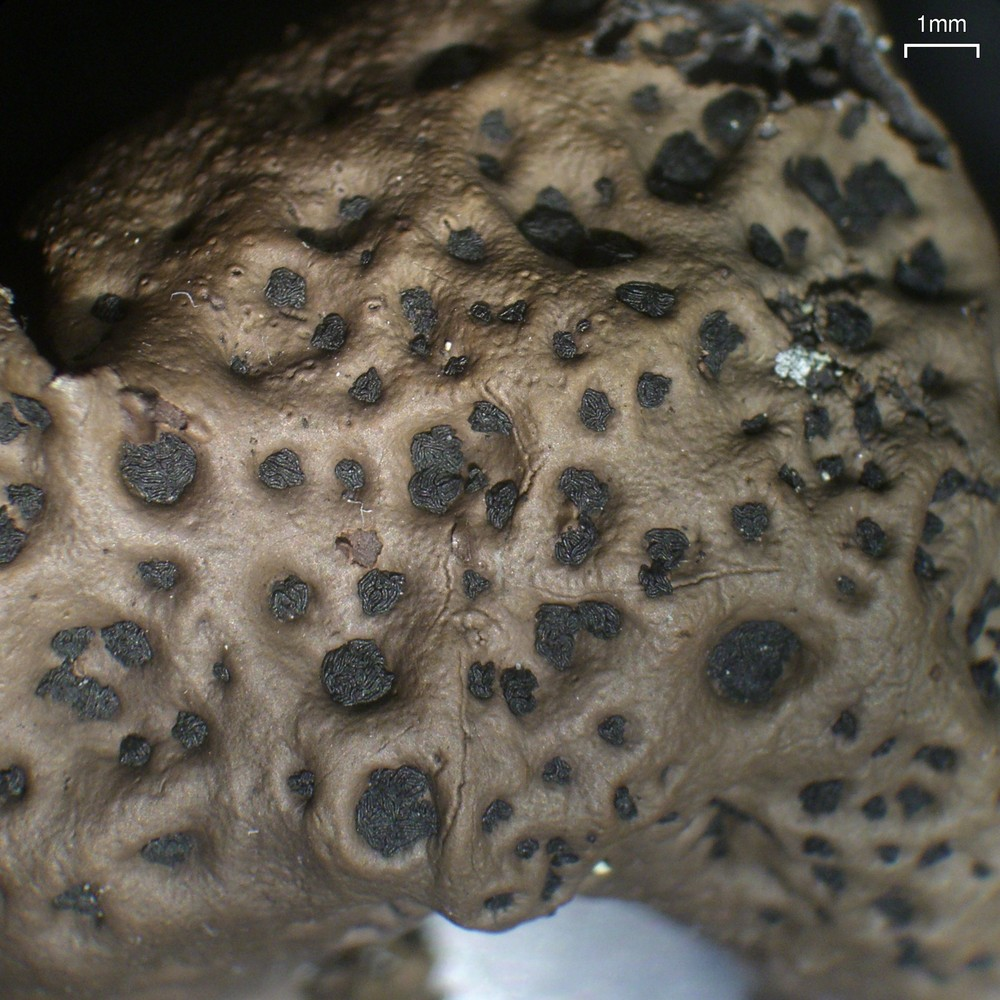

Conservation status
- Secure (NatureServe)

Scientific classification
- Kingdom: Fungi
- Division: Ascomycota
- Class: Lecanoromycetes
- Order: Umbilicariales
- Family: Umbilicariaceae
- Genus: Umbilicaria
- Species: U. muhlenbergii

Binomial name
- Umbilicaria muhlenbergii (Ach.) Tuck. (1845)

Synonyms
- Gyrophora mühlenbergii Ach. (1810); Actinogyra muhlenbergii (Ach.) Schol. (1936); Actinogyra muhlenbergii var. alpina (Tuck.) Llano (1950); Gyrophora muhlenbergii var. alpina (Tuck.) Zahlbr. (1927); Lecidea mühlenbergii (Ach.) Spreng. (1827); Lichen leiocarpus * muhlenbergii (Ach.) Lam. (1813); Umbilicaria muhlenbergii var. alpina Tuck. (1841)

= Umbilicaria muhlenbergii =

Species of lichen

Umbilicaria muhlenbergii, commonly known as plated rock tripe, is a species of saxicolous (rock-dwelling, umbilicate lichen in the family Umbilicariaceae.

== Taxonomy ==
The lichen was originally described by Swedish lichenologist Erik Acharius in 1810, as a species of Gyrophora–a now defunct genus that has been folded into synonymy with Umbilicaria. Edward Tuckerman made a formal transfer to Umbilicaria in a 1845 publication.

== Description ==
The lichen has a umbilicate thallus that is dark brown to greyish-brown in colour, ranging greatly in size and featuring a single folded leaf with a torn margin. It has a satin-like surface texture and is smooth or covered with small wart-like bumps (verruculose). The thallus underside is dark and shaggy with an open network that divides into stiff fibrils at the margin; the lichen lacks true rhizines. Its numerous apothecia are relatively large, situated in pits with a black, convex, and plicate disk folded in finer folds than in the apothecia of other Umbilicaria species. Apothecia are common in U. muhlenbergii; they typically measure 1–4 mm in diameter, with branched and radiating ridges, and partially immersed in the thallus surface. Fine-structure studies of the lichen show that the hyphae of its medulla have an extrahyphal, gel-like matrix (contrasting with other several species of Umbilicaria), and extensive, sheetlike lamellae are also present in the lower cortex of this species.

Gyrophoric acid is one of several lichen products that occur in Umbilicaria muhlenbergii. This compound is of research interest for its potential antitumor and antioxidant activities.

== Habitat and distribution ==
Umbilicaria muhlenbergii is widely distributed in the eastern United States, and in central and eastern Canada. It grows on steep rock walls and on boulders. A study conducted on rock-dwelling lichens in a coastal barren of Nova Scotia revealed that Umbilicaria muhlenbergii was predominantly found on the back faces of boulders, and its abundance gradually increased as one moved away from the shoreline. This observation led to the inference that the presence of the ocean had a negative impact on its growth, although the lichen is likely to possess salt tolerance.

== Uses ==
Adding pieces of the Umbilicaria muhlenbergii to fish broth was a practice adopted by the Woodland Cree (Sakāwithiniwak) people from southeastern Saskatchewan to transform it into a thick soup. This soup, believed to be gentle on the stomach, was used to feed the sick.

== Research ==
Umbilicaria muhlenbergii can grow in different forms depending on its environment: it occurs as fungal hyphae in lichen thalli, and as yeast cells when grown in axenic culture. It is unclear how this transition happens and its relationship with symbiosis. A 2020 study found that conditions of nutrient limitation, hyperosmotic stress, and contact with algal cells induced the dimorphic change in U. muhlenbergii. The cAMP-PKA pathway was identified as the main regulator of dimorphism, and its disruption can affect the symbiotic interaction between the photobiont and mycobiont.
