= Umbilicaria orientalis =

Scientific classification
- Domain: Eukaryota
- Kingdom: Fungi
- Division: Ascomycota
- Class: Lecanoromycetes
- Order: Umbilicariales
- Family: Umbilicariaceae
- Genus: Umbilicaria
- Species: U. orientalis

Binomial name
- Umbilicaria orientalis Davydov (2020)

Species of lichen

Umbilicaria orientalis is a species of foliose lichen belonging to the family Umbilicariaceae. It is recognized by its distinctive morphological features and unique molecular characteristics that distinguish it from closely related species such as Umbilicaria trabeculata. This lichen is primarily found across a range of localities in East Asia, extending from the Russian Far East to South Siberia, Mongolia, and regions in China including Hebei and Tibet.

== Taxonomy ==
Described as a new species in 2020 by Evgeny Davydov and colleagues, Umbilicaria orientalis was confirmed via molecular phylogenetics analysis involving three gene regions. This analysis not only highlighted its distinctiveness as a species but also established its sister relationship with Umbilicaria trabeculata within the U. vellea group. The species is included in the subgenus Papillophora, which is noted for its mostly Holarctic distribution and contains several other East Asian endemics.

== Description ==
The thallus of Umbilicaria orientalis is umbilicate, monophyllous, and can vary in size from 3–12 cm (1.2–4.7 in) in diameter. It has a grey to brownish-grey colour, sometimes with a violet tinge and is often pruinose. The thallus is rigid, with a smooth to minutely rimose or areolate upper surface, and undulates with broad folds. The lower surface, which is initially light brown in juvenile thalli, darkens with age to black, becoming lighter towards the margins. It features simple, cylindrical, or strap-like rhizinomorphs, which are specialised structures that can be unbranched or once branched, sometimes appearing sabre-shaped or strap-like, particularly when derived from the central trabeculae.

== Habitat and distribution ==
Umbilicaria orientalis thrives on steep siliceous rock outcrops in high mountain belts. It is adapted to wet conditions, though it is generally sheltered from direct precipitation. The species benefits from the humid microclimates provided by periodic fogs, which are typical of its high-altitude habitats.

This lichen is widely distributed across East Asia, with its range spanning from the Russian Far East and South Siberia to Mongolia and various provinces in China, including Tibet and Hebei.
