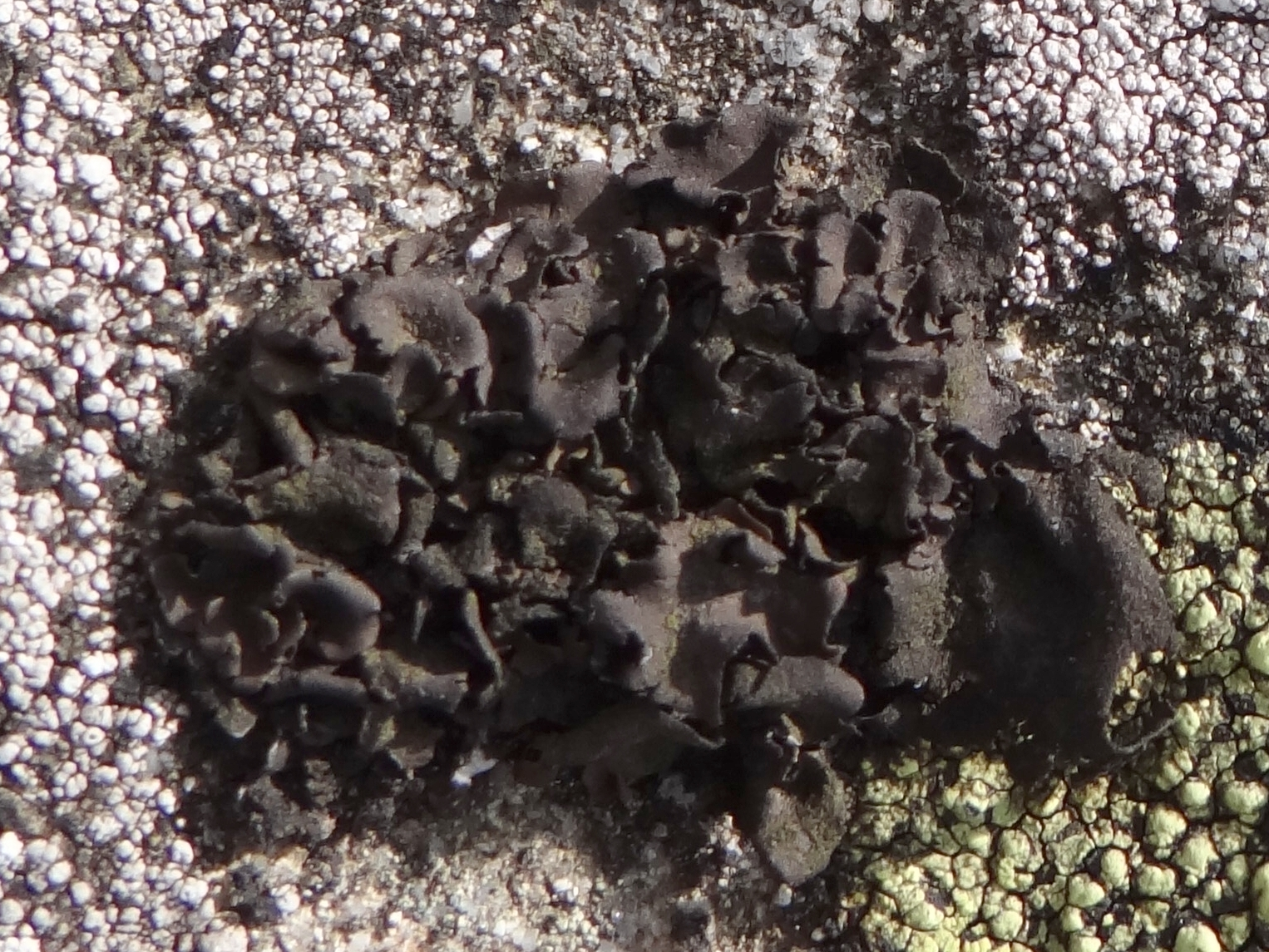

Conservation status
- Secure (NatureServe)

Scientific classification
- Kingdom: Fungi
- Division: Ascomycota
- Class: Lecanoromycetes
- Order: Umbilicariales
- Family: Umbilicariaceae
- Genus: Umbilicaria
- Species: U. polyphylla

Binomial name
- Umbilicaria polyphylla (L.) Baumg. (1790)

Synonyms
- Lichen polyphyllus L. (1753)

= Umbilicaria polyphylla =

Species of lichen-forming fungus

Umbilicaria polyphylla, commonly known as petaled rock tripe, is a widely distributed species of saxicolous lichen in the family Umbilicariaceae. It was first described by Carl Linnaeus in his 1753 work Species Plantarum as Lichen polyphyllus. German botanist Johann Christian Gottlob Baumgarten transferred it to the genus Umbilicaria in 1790. The lichen has a dark brown to black thallus that measures 2–6 cm (0.8–2.4 in) in diameter. The upper surface is smooth, while the lower surface is sooty black. It grows on exposed rocks, typically in arctic-alpine habitats.

In Iceland, it has the conservation status of a vulnerable species (VU).

== See also ==
- List of lichens named by Carl Linnaeus
