= Umbilicaria platyrhiza =

Scientific classification
- Domain: Eukaryota
- Kingdom: Fungi
- Division: Ascomycota
- Class: Lecanoromycetes
- Order: Umbilicariales
- Family: Umbilicariaceae
- Genus: Umbilicaria
- Species: U. platyrhiza

Binomial name
- Umbilicaria platyrhiza Davydov (2022)

Species of lichen

Umbilicaria platyrhiza is a foliose lichen of the family Umbilicariaceae, classified within the Umbilicaria crustulosa – U. spodochroa species complex. It is endemic to the Mediterranean region, specifically found in lowland silicate rocks within the provinces of İzmir, Turkey, and Burgas, Bulgaria.

== Taxonomy ==
Umbilicaria platyrhiza was described in 2022 by Evgeny Davydov as part of a broader study on the phylogeny of the Umbilicariaceae. It is differentiated from its closest relatives by the presence of umbilicaric acid, as opposed to crustinic acid found in similar species, and its unique apothecial (fruiting body) structure.

== Description ==
The thallus of Umbilicaria platyrhiza is umbilicate, meaning it attaches to the substrate at a single central point, and monophyllous, with a diameter of 2–4 cm and a thickness of 0.2–0.3 mm. Its upper surface ranges from pale to dark grey, occasionally displaying brown or violet tints, and is pruinose—giving it a frosted appearance. This surface is minutely cracked (rimose) and becomes rougher and partly radially folded towards the centre. The lower surface varies from dirty ochre-brown to grey-brown and darkens towards the centre, featuring simple to few times branched rhizinomorphs—root-like structures that are often flattened to strap-like and measure about 1 mm in length.

Apothecia, the reproductive structures, are commonly found at the periphery of the thallus, initially flat but becoming convex with age. They feature a single central protruding gyrus of sterile tissue. Ascospores are hyaline (translucent) and simple, measuring 14.0 to 20.0 by 9.0 to 17.5 μm.

Chemical analysis reveals the presence of gyrophoric acid as the major component, with umbilicaric and lecanoric acids as minor constituents.

== Habitat and distribution ==
This species grows on vertical siliceous rocks in maritime climates, benefiting from the moist conditions provided by its low-elevation Mediterranean habitats. It has only been documented in two locations: near Yamanlar Dağ in Turkey and in the Burgas region of Bulgaria.
