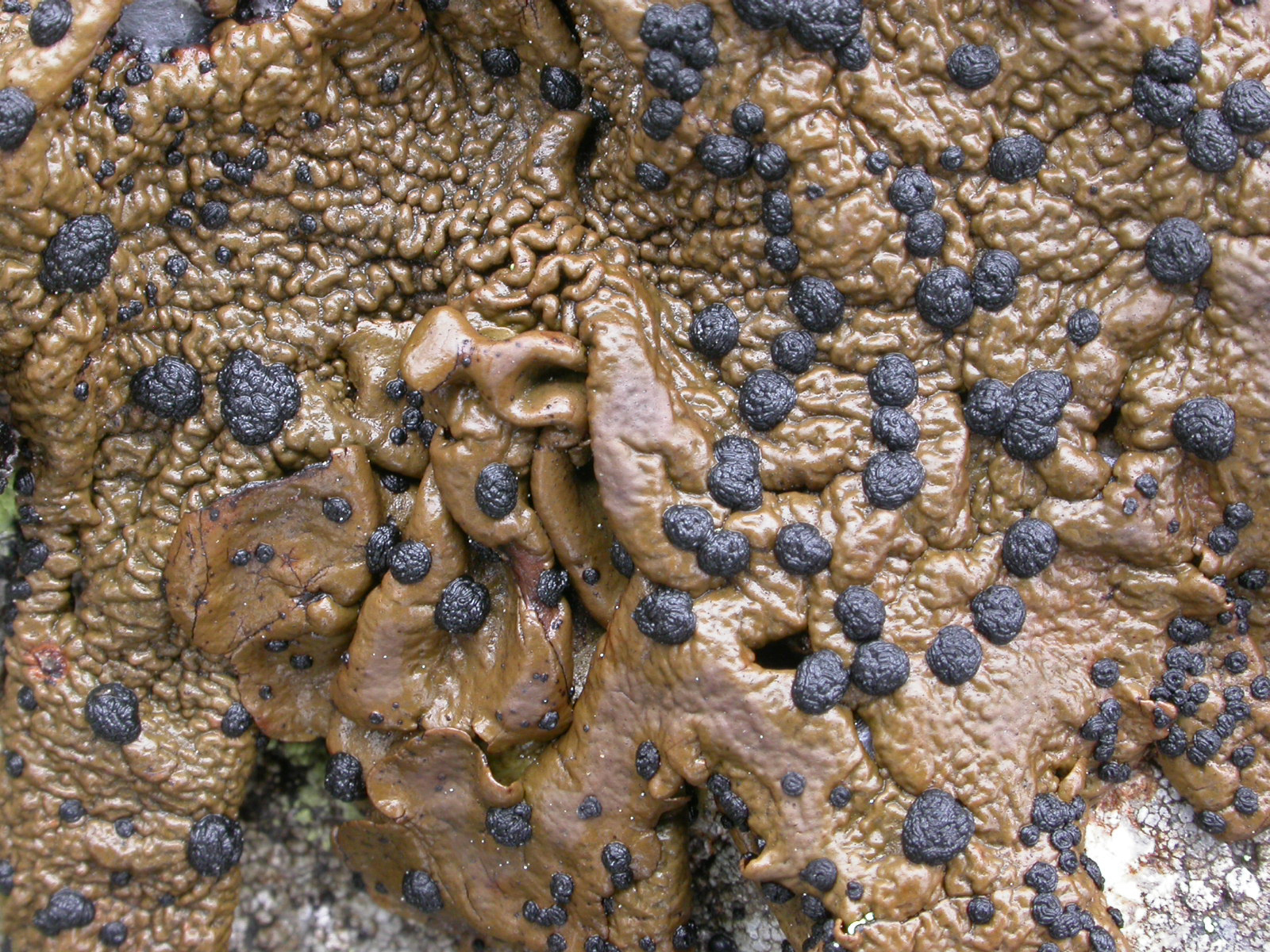
- on Blackcomb Peak, Whistler, British Columbia

Conservation status
- Secure (NatureServe)

Scientific classification
- Kingdom: Fungi
- Division: Ascomycota
- Class: Lecanoromycetes
- Order: Umbilicariales
- Family: Umbilicariaceae
- Genus: Umbilicaria
- Species: U. hyperborea

Binomial name
- Umbilicaria hyperborea (Ach.) Hoffm. (1796)

Synonyms
- Lichen hyperboreus Ach. (1794)

= Umbilicaria hyperborea =

Species of lichen

Umbilicaria hyperborea, commonly known as blistered rock tripe, is a species of foliose lichen in the family Umbilicariaceae. It is widely distributed in arctic and alpine regions.

== Taxonomy ==
It was first described as a new species by Swedish lichenologist Erik Acharius in 1794 as Lichen hyperboreus. Georg Franz Hoffmann transferred it to the genus Umbilicaria in 1796.

In a 2017 molecular phylogenetic analysis of the genus Umbilicaria, U. hyperborea was proposed as the type species of the subgenus Umbilicaria. Closely related species include U. polyphylla, U. iberica, and U. arctica.

== Description ==
The thallus of Umbilicaria hyperborea ranges in colour from medium- to dark-brown, with texture of the upper surface more or less smooth or warty. The thallus undersurface is smooth, and there are not any rhizines. The disc-shaped apothecia are flat to convex and have multiple complex ridges.

== Habitat and distribution ==
The lichen typically grows on rock in arctic and alpine climates. It has, however, been recorded growing on acidic wood; specimens found in this substrate may have an altered morphology compared to those found on rock, such as stunted and faded thalli lacking apothecia. It is one of the most common Umbilicaria species in Arctic and adjacent Northern locations. Umbilicaria hyperborea has a very slow growth rate; in a study undertaken in Greenland, it was measured as 0.3–0.4 mm per year over the time period 1933–1970.

Umbilicaria hyperborea in a fjord on the northeast coast of Greenland
