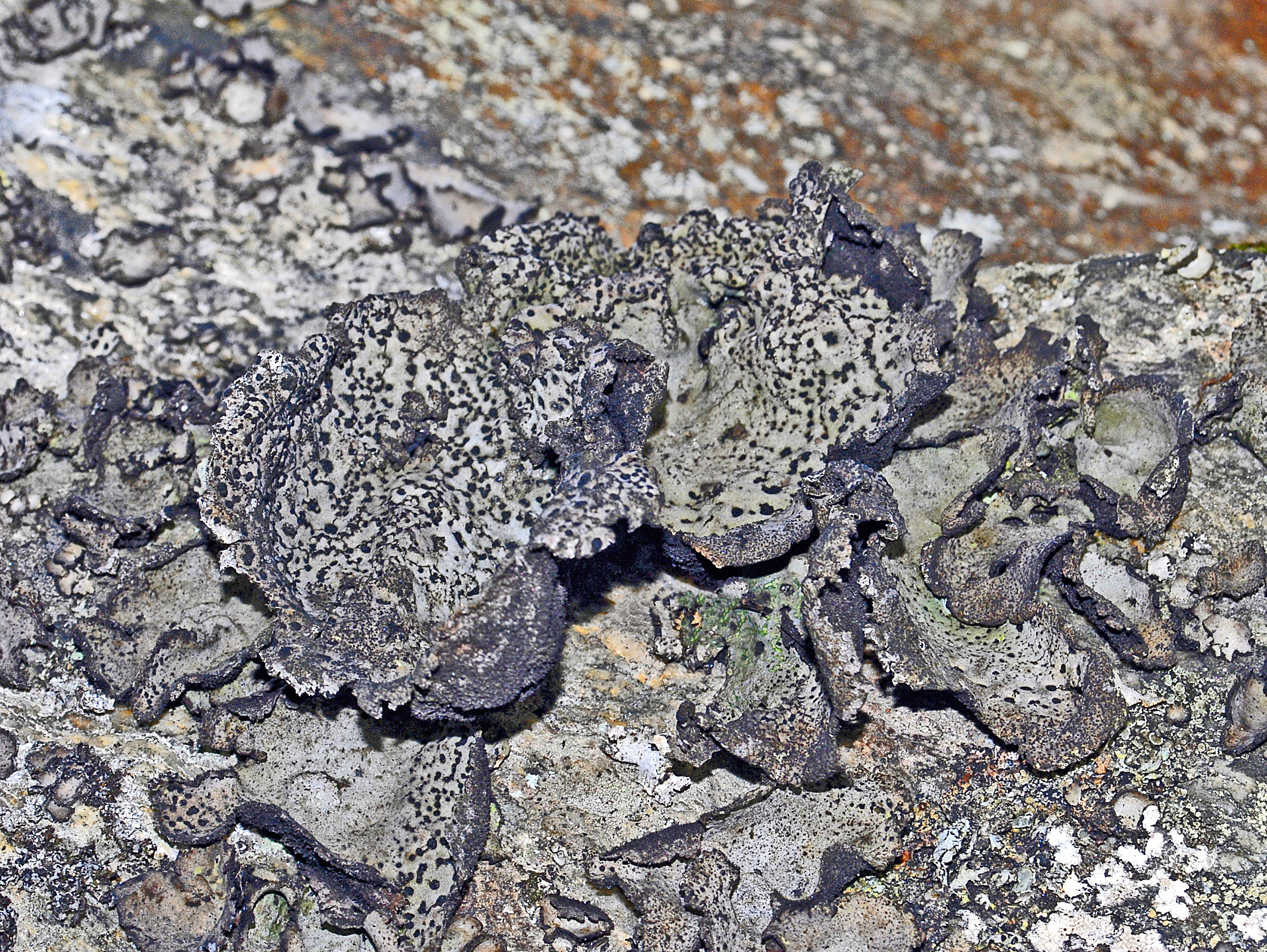

Scientific classification
- Kingdom: Fungi
- Division: Ascomycota
- Class: Lecanoromycetes
- Order: Umbilicariales
- Family: Umbilicariaceae
- Genus: Umbilicaria
- Species: U. crustulosa

Binomial name
- Umbilicaria crustulosa (Ach.) Lamy (1879)

Synonyms
- Gyrophora depressa (Ach.) Schaer.; Omphalodiscus crustulosus (Ach.) Schol.; Gyrophora crustulosa Ach. (1810); Gyrophora spodochroa var. crustulosa (Ach.) Arnold; Gyrophoropsis crustulosa (Ach.) Räsänen

= Umbilicaria crustulosa =

Species of lichen

Umbilicaria crustulosa, the crusty navel lichen, is a lichen of the genus Umbilicaria in the family Umbilicariaceae.

== Distribution ==
This species is present in Arctic, Europe, temperate and tropical Asia, Africa and North America. It grows on rocks.
