= Umbilicaria isidiosa =

Scientific classification
- Kingdom: Fungi
- Division: Ascomycota
- Class: Lecanoromycetes
- Order: Umbilicariales
- Family: Umbilicariaceae
- Genus: Umbilicaria
- Species: U. isidiosa

Binomial name
- Umbilicaria isidiosa Krzewicka (2009)
- Holotype: near the village of Siberia, Bolivia

Species of lichen

Umbilicaria isidiosa is a species of foliose lichen belonging to the family Umbilicariaceae. It is endemic to Bolivia, where it occurs in high-altitude regions of the Bolivian Andes. It is distinguished by its thallus, which has an upper surface ranging from ashy brown to mouse grey, featuring a frosty (pruinose) texture that varies from smooth to slightly rough. This surface is adorned with numerous isidia (reproductive propagules), ranging from spherical to richly branched, primarily concentrated along the margins. The lower surface is dark, transitioning from smooth to rough in texture, and sparsely covered with dark rhizines (root-like structures).

== Taxonomy ==
This species was first described by the Polish lichenologist Beata Krzewicka in 2009. The type specimen of Umbilicaria isidiosa was collected by Adam Flakus northwest of Comarapa city, near the village of Siberia, within the Santa Cruz Department's Manuel María Caballero Province. Found at an elevation of 3,480 m (11,420 ft), the specimen was located on sandstone in an open area. It is placed within the genus Umbilicaria, a group widely recognized for its members that are adapted to extreme environments, including polar and mountainous regions. The species epithet, isidiosa, refers to the presence of isidia, a feature that occurs rarely in Umbilicaria.

== Description ==
Umbilicaria isidiosa features a monophyllous (single-leaf), umbilicate (attached at one point) thallus that is orbicular to irregular in shape, measuring 1–4 cm (0.4–1.6 in) in diameter. The thallus margin is often incised-lobate. The upper surface is ashy brown to mouse grey, pruinose (frosty appearance), smooth to slightly scabrous. The lower surface is blackish and ranges from smooth to scabrous with sparse, blackish rhizines (root-like structures). The lichen is characterized for its numerous, dark brown to blackish, globular to richly branched isidia (outgrowths) clustered at its margins. Thin-layer chromatography reveals the presence of gyrophoric acid, a secondary metabolite.

== Habitat and distribution ==
Umbilicaria isidiosa occurs on siliceous sandstone in exposed, sunny locations at a high altitude. These locations are characteristically windy and receive moisture from periodic fogs, making the habitat both humid and challenging. The lichen grows on large rock blocks scattered across an agricultural area at the fringes of the Yungas cloud forest. It is often found in association with species from the genera Aspicilia, Caloplaca, Rhizocarpon, and Usnea, but no other Umbilicaria species have been observed in the vicinity.
