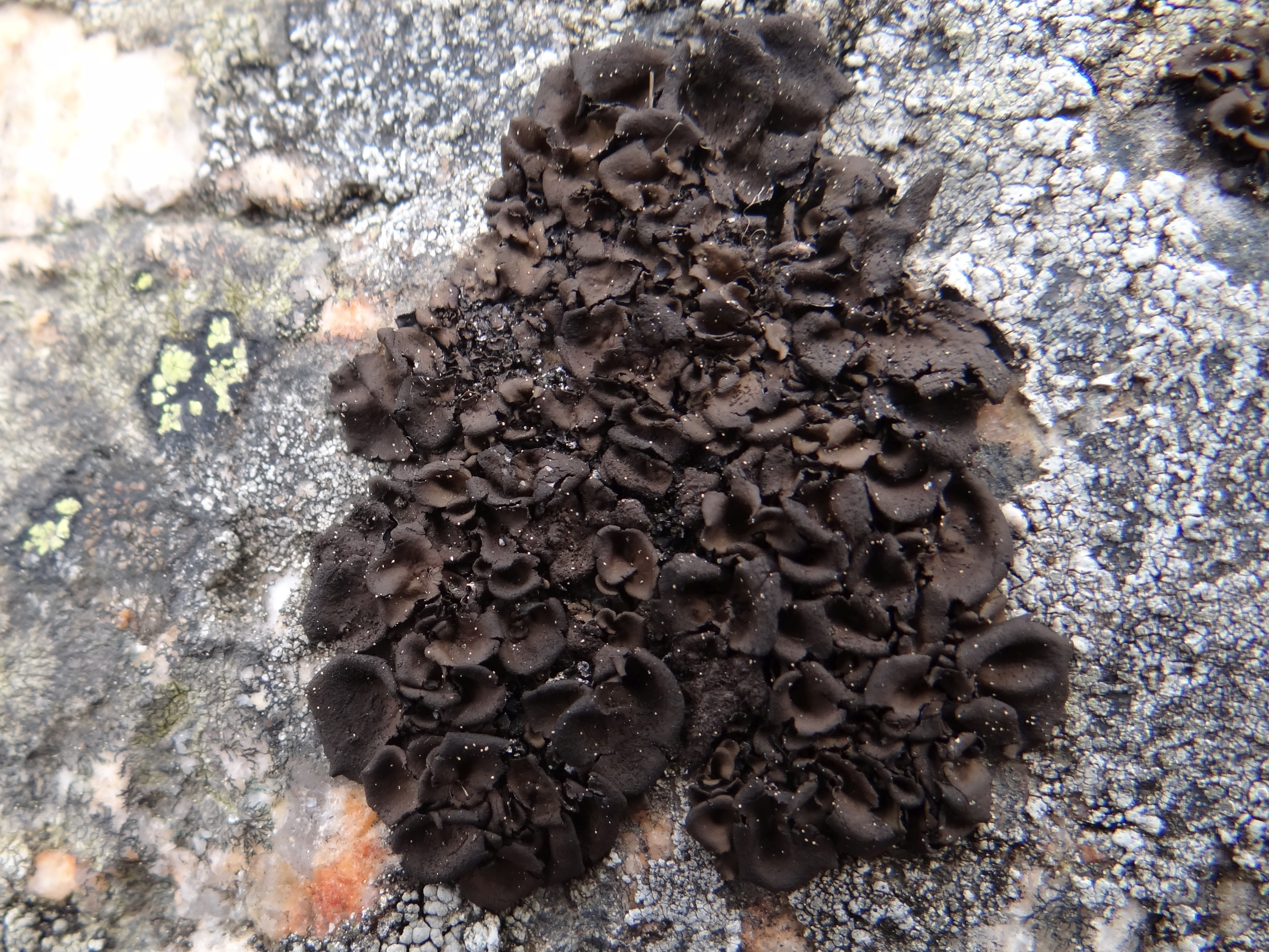

Conservation status
- Secure (NatureServe)

Scientific classification
- Kingdom: Fungi
- Division: Ascomycota
- Class: Lecanoromycetes
- Order: Umbilicariales
- Family: Umbilicariaceae
- Genus: Umbilicaria
- Species: U. deusta

Binomial name
- Umbilicaria deusta (L.) Baumg. (1790)

Synonyms
- Lichen deustus L. (1753)

= Umbilicaria deusta =

Species of lichen-forming fungus

Umbilicaria deusta, commonly known as peppered rock tripe, is a widely distributed species of saxicolous lichen in the family Umbilicariaceae. It was first described by Carl Linnaeus in his 1753 work Species Plantarum as Lichen polyphyllus. German botanist Johann Christian Gottlob Baumgarten transferred it to the genus Umbilicaria in 1790. The lichen has a dark brown to nearly black thallus that typically measures 1–5 cm (0.4–2.0 in) in diameter. The upper surface is covered with tiny black dots that are granular isidia; the lower surface is the same colour as the upper surface, and is either smooth or covereds with dimples. It grows on exposed boulders and rocky outcrops.

== See also ==
- List of lichens named by Carl Linnaeus
