= Umbilicaria murihikuana =

Scientific classification
- Kingdom: Fungi
- Division: Ascomycota
- Class: Lecanoromycetes
- Order: Umbilicariales
- Family: Umbilicariaceae
- Genus: Umbilicaria
- Species: U. murihikuana

Binomial name
- Umbilicaria murihikuana D.J.Galloway & Sancho (2005)

Species of lichen-forming fungus

Umbilicaria murihikuana is a rare species of saxicolous (rock-dwelling) lichen in the family Umbilicariaceae. It is endemic to New Zealand, where it occurs in mountainous, high-rainfall areas of Otago and Southland. It grows on exposed rocks and boulders at altitudes between 1,000 and 1,500 m (3,300 and 4,900 ft), in subalpine to alpine habitats.

== Taxonomy ==
Umbilicaria murihikuana was formally described in 2005 by David J. Galloway and Leopoldo Sancho. The type specimen was collected by the first author at the head of Rockburn (Otago), at an altitude of 1,433 m (4,701 ft); there it was found growing on the tops of boulders, in association with the foliose lichen species Menegazzia inflata. The species epithet murihikuana is derived from the Māori name Murihuki, which means "the tail of the fish" or "the tail end of the land", and refers to its distribution in the southern mountains.

The type specimen, collected by Galloway in May 1968, waited 37 years in the herbarium of the Manaaki Whenua – Landcare Research before being correctly classified and formally recognized as new species. Galloway documents re-collecting the lichen at the same location, more than four decades later in 2011.

== Description ==
The monophyllous (single-lobed) thallus of Umbilicaria murihikuana is typically between 1 and 2.5 cm (0.4 and 1.0 in) in diameter, although some specimens have been documented up to 6 cm (2.4 in) wide. It is pale olive-green to greyish green (when wet) and with a leathery texture; the undersurface of the thallus is black The margins of the thallus are somewhat wavy, sometimes delicately notched, and in places have a conspicuous black rim. There are occasional tufts of small, bush, black rhizinomorphs. The apothecia are fairly prominent, and are either somewhat immersed in the thallus or flush with the surface. They are round to irregular in shape, typically measuring 1–2 mm in diameter.

Umbilicaria murihikuana contains norstictic acid and gyrophoric acid in its medulla. The expected results for chemical spot tests on the medulla are K+ (yellow turning to red), C+ (red), and Pd−.
