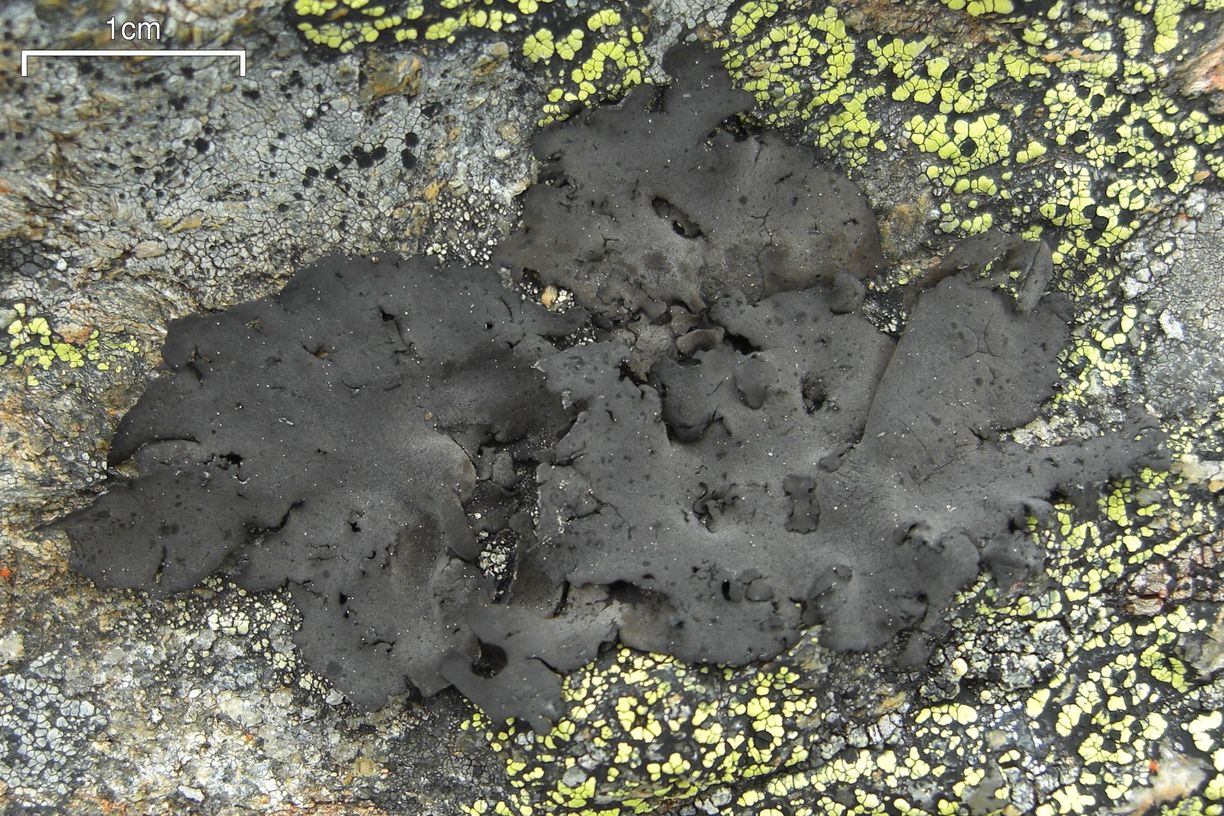

Scientific classification
- Kingdom: Fungi
- Division: Ascomycota
- Class: Lecanoromycetes
- Order: Umbilicariales
- Family: Umbilicariaceae
- Genus: Umbilicaria
- Species: U. leiocarpa

Binomial name
- Umbilicaria leiocarpa DC. (1805)

Synonyms
- List: Lichen leiocarpus (DC.) Lam. (1813); Lichen leiocarpa (DC.) DC. (1814); Gyrophora leiocarpa (DC.) Steud. (1824); Umbilicaria flocculosa var. leiocarpa (DC.) Duby (1830); Agyrophora leiocarpa (DC.) Gyeln. (1932)

= Umbilicaria leiocarpa =

Species of lichen-forming fungus

Umbilicaria leiocarpa, commonly known as textured rock tripe, is a species of saxicolous (rock-dwelling), umbilicate lichen in the family Umbilicariaceae. First described by Augustin Pyramus de Candolle in 1805, it is characterised by its small to medium-sized grey thallus with a cracked upper surface and smooth reproductive structures. The species has a primarily Holarctic distribution, being found across Europe from Fennoscandia to the Pyrenees, with populations occurring from sea level to alpine elevations around 2,000 m (6,600 ft). It shows a particular preference for siliceous rock substrates and is absent from northern Lapland despite being common in similar habitats elsewhere in Fennoscandia. The species belongs to the subgenus Agyrophora, one of eight recognised subgenera within Umbilicaria, and is distinguished by its smooth, non-pustulate thallus and distinctive asexual reproduction through specialised structures called thalloconidia.

== Taxonomy ==
The species was scientifically described as new to science in 1805 by the Swiss botanist Augustin Pyramus de Candolle in the second volume of the third edition of Flore Française. The specific epithet leiocarpa refers to the smooth surface of its apothecia (fruiting bodies), which de Candolle translated from Latin as "fruits lisse" (smooth fruits). This characteristic later contributed to the term 'leiodisc' being adopted to describe this type of smooth apothecial surface in lichenology.

The species was discovered by the French botanist Louis François Élisabeth Ramond, who had originally intended to name it Lichen infundibuliformis, though this name remained unpublished. Ramond collected the type specimen on 26 August 1793 at Port Madamette (now Col de Madaméte) in the Pyrenees. This specimen was designated as the lectotype in 2017 and is housed at the BBF herbarium of the Conservatoire botanique national des Pyrénées et de Midi-Pyrénées.

In its taxonomic history, the species has been placed in various genera, including the eponymous genus Lichen, as well as Gyrophora, and Agyrophora; Jean Étienne Duby classified it as a variety of Umbilicaria flocculosa. When Swiss lichenologist Ludwig Schaerer discovered the species in the Alps in 1817, he overlooked de Candolle's earlier naming and described it as Gyrophora atropruinosa var. tesselata. As a result, historical herbarium specimens are often labelled under either atropruinosa or anthracina.

In a comprehensive 2017 phylogenetic revision of Umbilicariaceae, U. leiocarpa was placed within subgenus Agyrophora, one of eight newly recognised monophyletic subgenera within Umbilicaria. Species in this subgenus are characterised by their small to medium-sized body (thallus) that never develops blisters, and has a distinctive matt, grey, cracked upper surface. The lower surface is smooth to similarly cracked and lacks root-like attachments (rhizinomorphs), though it often produces specialised asexual reproductive structures (thalloconidia) that develop directly from the surface tissue and are not divided into segments. Members of subg. Agyrophora typically produce disc-shaped reproductive structures (apothecia) that sit directly on or are raised above the surface, with a predominantly smooth upper surface. Each reproductive structure contains spore sacs (asci) with eight simple spores, though rarely more complex divided spores may occur. This group has a primarily Holarctic distribution, with species found only in specific regions of Europe and North America.

== Habitat and distribution ==
Umbilicaria leiocarpa is predominantly found in the alpine regions of Fennoscandia, although its presence extends across Europe. In Fennoscandia, it is largely found in similar locales to Umbilicaria rigida, albeit it is absent from northern Lapland and adjacent parts of Norway—a notable exception given the abundant U. rigida specimens from those areas. Its European distribution includes populations in the Alps, as well as occurrences in the Carpathians and the Pyrenees. It is also found in Scotland and Japan. In Nepal, U. leiocarpa has been reported at 5,150 m elevation in a compilation of published records; this reported range lies above the tree line used in the study. In northern Europe, the species tends to inhabit elevations up to around 2,000 m (6,600 ft), primarily in alpine conditions, but it has also been found at sea level, suggesting a wide ecological amplitude. This distribution pattern supports the hypothesis that U. leiocarpa could have survived the last ice age in refugia in Southern Norway, from where it may have spread along the Scandinavian mountain chain to its current locations. The species shows a distinct preference for siliceous rock substrates. Although it has been historically been reported to occur in the Kamchatka Peninsula (Russia), those records are now considered dubious and thought to refer to other species.
