= Umbilicaria nodulospora =

Conservation status
- Vulnerable (NatureServe)

Scientific classification
- Kingdom: Fungi
- Division: Ascomycota
- Class: Lecanoromycetes
- Order: Umbilicariales
- Family: Umbilicariaceae
- Genus: Umbilicaria
- Species: U. nodulospora

Binomial name
- Umbilicaria nodulospora McCune, Di Meglio & Curtis (2014)

Species of lichen

Umbilicaria nodulospora is a species of foliose lichen in the family Umbilicariaceae, discovered on steep rock faces of old lava flows in California and Oregon, USA. This species is distinguished by the unique shape of its ascospores and its DNA sequence, which does not closely relate to any known species within its family.

== Taxonomy ==
The species was formally described in 2014 by Bruce McCune, Joseph Di Meglio, and Marc J. Curtis, following DNA analysis and detailed study of its unique spore morphology. The molecular phylogenetics analysis involved the internal transcribed spacer (ITS) and large subunit (LSU) of ribosomal DNA, confirming its distinctiveness but not identifying any close relatives within the Umbilicariaceae.

== Description ==
The thallus of Umbilicaria nodulospora is either monophyllous (single-leafed) or polyphyllous (multiple leaves), growing up to 2–3 cm (0.8–1.2 in) in diameter and about 0.2 mm thick, excluding the rhizines. It features a brown to gray-brown upper surface that is faintly to distinctly pruinose (powdery), creating a grayish effect especially near the central attachment point (umbo). The texture is smooth to broadly cracked in a network pattern (reticulation), facilitating the thallus splitting into partial thalli. The edges may be whole to irregularly torn or lobed.

The lower surface varies from brown to black, often covered with a dense mat of rhizines—hair-like growths that anchor the lichen to its substrate. These rhizines can be parallel or entangled, contributing to a mat that is 1–2 mm thick. The apothecia (fruiting bodies) are black, sessile (directly attached), and can be up to 2 mm in diameter, typically showing a gyrose (brain-like) surface. The spores are simple and hyaline (translucent), and characterized by having one or two blunt, shallow knobs at one end, giving them a T, Y, or L shape.

== Habitat and distribution ==
Umbilicaria nodulospora is known from geologically recent flood basalts in central Oregon to northeastern California. It inhabits steeply inclined surfaces of these basalt flows, typically found in cooler, north-facing areas. The specific ecological adaptations that allow it to thrive in such niches are not fully understood, though its occurrence on basalt is a key aspect of its habitat preference.
