= C25H22O10 =

The molecular formula C_{25}H_{22}O_{10} may refer to:

- Silibinin, major active constituent of silymarin
- Umbilicaric acid, an organic polyphenolic carboxylic acid
