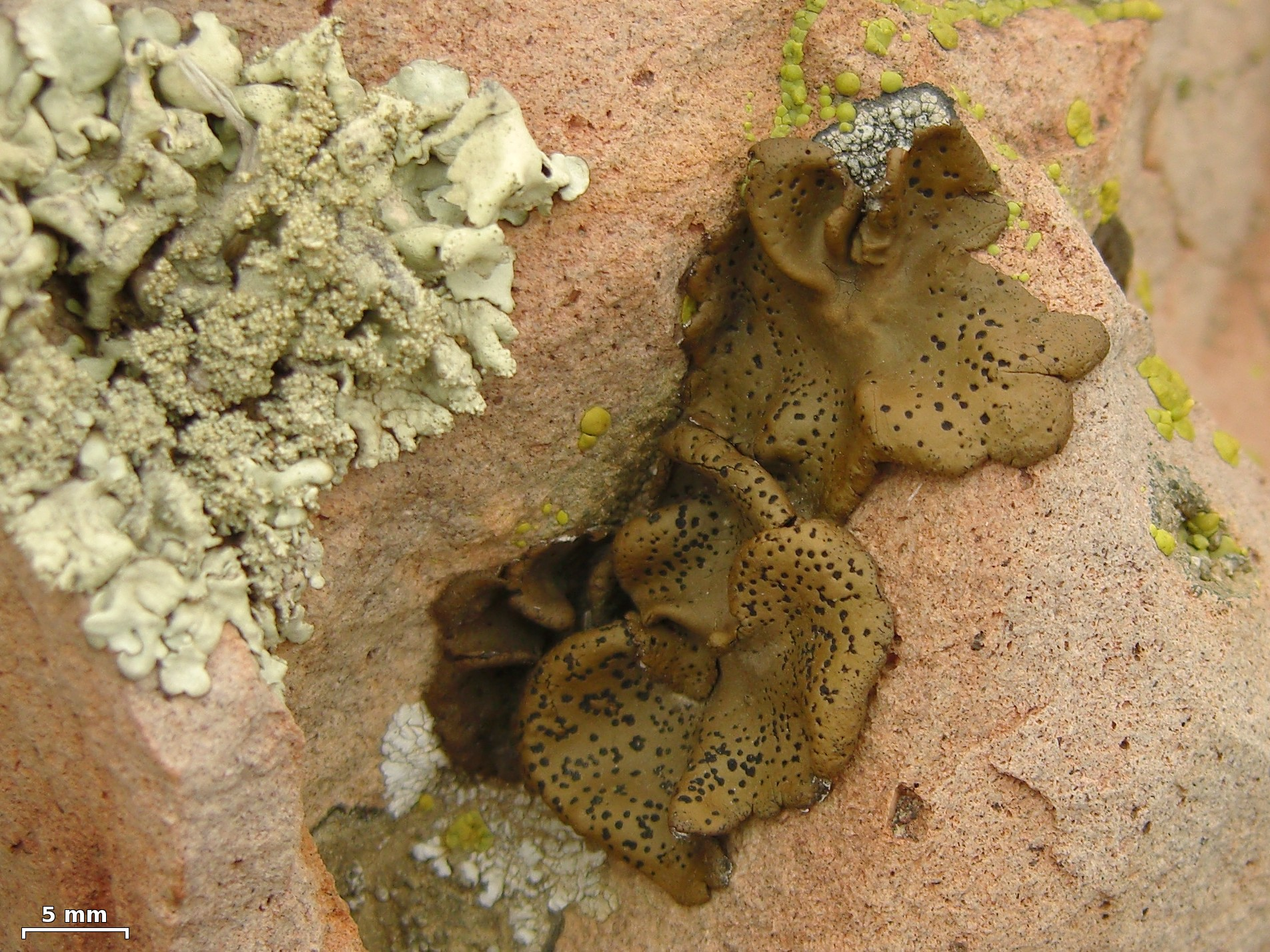
- Umbilicaria phaea is the lichen on the right

Conservation status
- Secure (NatureServe)

Scientific classification
- Kingdom: Fungi
- Division: Ascomycota
- Class: Lecanoromycetes
- Order: Umbilicariales
- Family: Umbilicariaceae
- Genus: Umbilicaria
- Species: U. phaea

Binomial name
- Umbilicaria phaea Tuck. (1869)

= Umbilicaria phaea =

Species of lichen

Umbilicaria phaea is a brown, umbilicate foliose lichen that grows up to 6 cm (2.4 in) in diameter, sometimes in colonies covering large patches of desert rocks. One variety that grows in northern California is brilliant red. It is monophyllous with a single 1 – 5 cm flattish leaf-like cap on top of an anchoring stem (umbilicate). The leaflike top is smooth with some lobes, roughly circular, thin, and brittle. The lower surface is light gray to light brown. It has up to 2.5 mm black circular to slightly polygonal spots that are the fruiting bodies (apothecia), slightly sunken into the main nonfruiting body part (thallus). It grows on siliceous boulders in very dry climates of western North and South America, where it is usually the most common member of its genus.
