= Umbilicaria aprina =

Scientific classification
- Kingdom: Fungi
- Division: Ascomycota
- Class: Lecanoromycetes
- Order: Umbilicariales
- Family: Umbilicariaceae
- Genus: Umbilicaria
- Species: U. aprina

Binomial name
- Umbilicaria aprina Nyl. (1863)

Synonyms
- Gyrophora aprina (Nyl.) Nyl. (1891); Umbilicaria aprina var. andina Hestmark (2016)

Species of lichen

Umbilicaria aprina is a species of foliose lichen in the family Umbilicariaceae. It is primarily found on exposed boulders in high alpine and polar regions worldwide.

== Taxonomy ==
Umbilicaria aprina was first described by the Finnish lichenologist William Nylander in 1863. He later (1891) proposed it be reclassified in genus Gyrophora. The holotype of Umbilicaria aprina was collected from Ras Dashen in Ethiopia, at an elevation of about 14,200 ft (4,300 m).

== Description ==
The thallus of Umbilicaria aprina is single-leaved (monophyllous), shield-shaped (peltate), and rigid, measuring up to 6 cm (2.4 in) in diameter. The upper surface is light grey, typically featuring radiating ridges from the central, elevated point known as the umbo. The lower surface is predominantly sooty black with a light grey rim about 2–3 mm wide along the margins. This lower surface is covered with single-celled reproductive propagules known as thalloconidia and adorned with white rhizinomorphs—root-like extensions that are unbranched or sparsely branched and densely populate the rim. Reproductive structures (apothecia) are rare, black, and may be up to 2.5 mm in diameter.

== Habitat and distribution ==
Umbilicaria aprina is commonly found in the high alpine regions near glaciers and is present worldwide, including extreme arctic and Antarctic areas. Although it is not commonly found in the Andes, it exists throughout the mountain range. The species grows on boulders in these cold, exposed environments, which helps it avoid competition and survive in harsh conditions.
