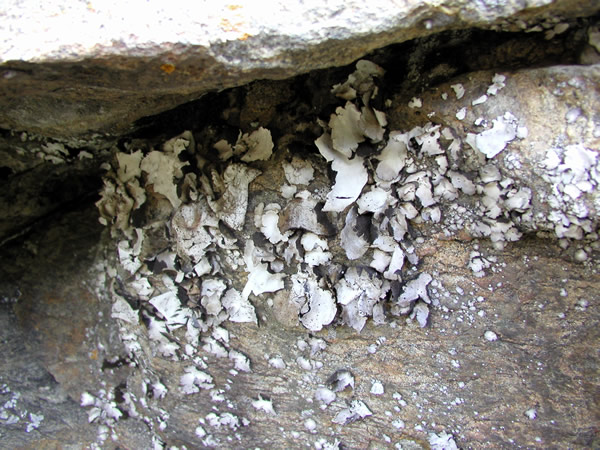
- Umbilicaria americana growing on rock faces

Conservation status
- Secure (NatureServe)

Scientific classification
- Kingdom: Fungi
- Division: Ascomycota
- Class: Lecanoromycetes
- Order: Umbilicariales
- Family: Umbilicariaceae
- Genus: Umbilicaria
- Species: U. americana

Binomial name
- Umbilicaria americana Poelt & T.H.Nash (1993)

= Umbilicaria americana =

Species of lichen

Umbilicaria americana, commonly known as frosted rock tripe, is a foliose lichen of rock faces.

== Description ==
Umbilicaria americana has been described as looking like "grayish-white potato chips." The upper surface is gray with the appearance of white dusting. The lower surface is black. The lobes are 2 to 7 cm in diameter.
