= Umbilicaric acid =

Names
- Preferred IUPAC name 2-Hydroxy-4-({2-hydroxy-4-[(4-hydroxy-2-methoxy-6-methylbenzoyl)oxy]-6-methylbenzoyl}oxy)-6-methylbenzoic acid

Identifiers
CAS Number	30666-92-3
3D model (JSmol)	Interactive image
ChEBI	CHEBI:144309
ChemSpider	103874234
PubChem CID	12444590
UNII	N6HJ6CP5HM
CompTox Dashboard (EPA)	DTXSID901110297
- InChI: InChI=1S/C25H22O10/c1-11-5-14(26)8-19(33-4)22(11)25(32)35-16-7-13(3)21(18(28)10-16)24(31)34-15-6-12(2)20(23(29)30)17(27)9-15/h5-10,26-28H,1-4H3,(H,29,30) Key: RLRCNRNYRSKNOO-UHFFFAOYSA-N
- SMILES: CC1=CC(=CC(=C1C(=O)OC2=CC(=C(C(=C2)C)C(=O)OC3=CC(=C(C(=C3)C)C(=O)O)O)O)OC)O

Properties
Chemical formula	C_{25}H_{22}O_{10}
Molar mass	482.441 g·mol^{−1}
Melting point	203 °C (397 °F; 476 K)
- Except where otherwise noted, data are given for materials in their standard state (at 25 °C [77 °F], 100 kPa). Infobox references

Umbilicaric acid is an organic polyphenolic carboxylic acid made by several species of lichen. It is named after Umbilicaria. Umbilicaric acid is a tridepside, containing three phenol rings in orsellinic acid moieties.

Identification of unbilicaric acid can be important in the identification of lichen species.

== See also ==
- Gyrophoric acid
