= Johann Christian Gottlob Baumgarten =

German physician and botanist (1765–1843)

Johann Christian Gottlob Baumgarten (7 April 1765 – 29 December 1843) was a German medical doctor and botanist who was a native of Luckau in Lower Lusatia.

He studied at the medical-surgical college in Dresden and at the University of Leipzig (from 1785), where he was a student of Johann Ehrenfried Pohl. While at Leipzig he performed field studies of its local flora, publishing the treatise "Flora Lipsiensis" in 1790. The same year he earned his philosophy degree, and in 1791 received his medical doctorate. Afterwards he furthered his studies of botany and medicine in Vienna.

In 1793 he travelled to Transylvania, where he undertook pioneer investigations of its flora. In 1794, he was named district medical officer in Leschkirch, and from 1801, performed a similar role in Schäßburg (today known as Sighişoara, Romania). From 1807 onward, he devoted all his time and energy to botanical research in Transylvania. In 1816, he published the first of a four-volume work on Transylvanian flora titled "Enumeratio stirpium Magno Transsilvaniae principatui" (1816–46).

A species of bellflower, Campanula baumgartenii, is named after Baumgarten. He is the taxonomic authority of the genera Telekia, Banffya, Candollea and Triodon as well as of numerous plant species.
