= Georg Franz Hoffmann =

German botanist (1760-1826)

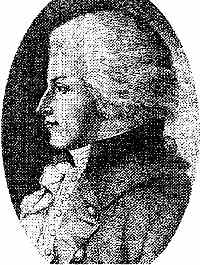
Georg Franz Hoffmann.

Georg Franz Hoffmann was a German botanist and lichenologist. He was born on 13 January 1760 in Marktbreit, Germany, and died on 17 March 1826 in Moscow, Russia.

== Professional career ==
After graduating from the University of Erlangen in 1786, he worked there between 1787 and 1792 as a professor of botany. Between 1792 and 1803 he was Head of the Botany Department and Director of the Botanical Garden of Göttingen University. Already a famous botanist, in particular for his work on lichens, he settled in Moscow in January 1804 and directed the Department of Botany at University of Moscow, as well as the Botanical garden.

== Works ==
- Descriptio et adumbratio plantarum e classe cryptogámica Linnaei qua lichenes dicuntur... (1789-1801)
- Vegetabilia cryptogama. (1790, Erlangen)
- Nomenclator Fungorum. (1789-1790, two volumes, Berlin)
- Historia salicum, iconibus illustrata. (1785-1787, Leipzig)
- Deutschlands Flora, oder, Botanisches Taschenbuch (1791, 1795, 1800, and 1804, Erlangen)
- Enumeratio plantarum et seminum hort botanici mosquensis. (1808, Moscow)
- Genera Plantarum Umbelliferarum (1814, 1816, Moscow)
- Herbarium vivum, sive collectio plantarum siccarun, Caesareae Universitatis Mosquensis. Pars secunda, continents . . . (1825)

In 1787, Olof Peter Swartz (1760–1818) dedicated the genus Hoffmannia of the Rubiaceae to him.

== See also ==
- Category:Taxa named by Georg Franz Hoffmann
