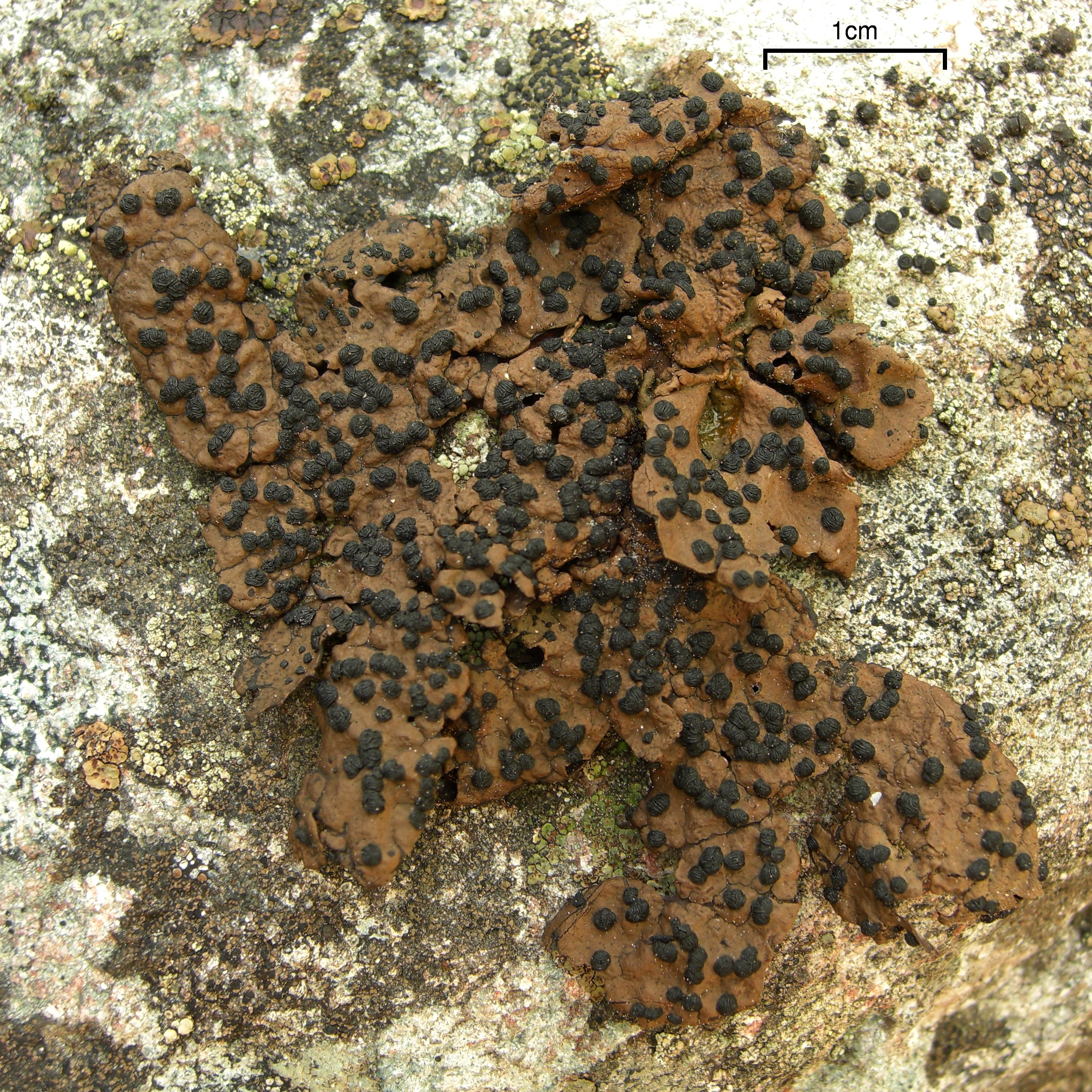
- Umbilicaria hyperborea

Scientific classification
- Kingdom: Fungi
- Division: Ascomycota
- Class: Lecanoromycetes
- Order: Umbilicariales
- Family: Umbilicariaceae; Chevall. (1826)

Type genus
- Umbilicaria Hoffm. (1798)

Genera
- Fulgidea; Lasallia; Omphalodium; Umbilicaria; Xylopsora

= Umbilicariaceae =

Family of lichen-forming fungi

The Umbilicariaceae are a family of lichenized fungi in the Ascomycota. Species of this family are known from a variety of climates, including temperate, boreal, austral, and warmer montane regions. The family contains five genera and 53 species.
