= Rock tripe =

Edible rock-dwelling lichens

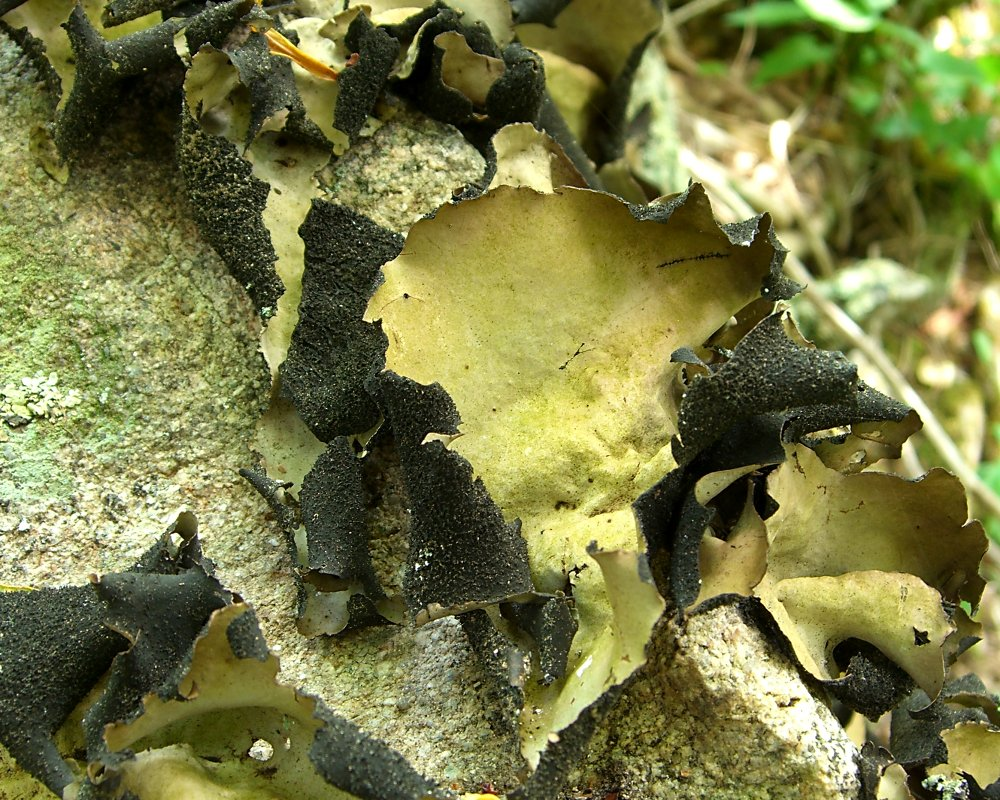
Smooth rock tripe (Umbilicaria mammulata) growing on rock

Rock tripe is a common name for edible rock-dwelling lichens, especially species of Umbilicaria. The term is vernacular rather than taxonomic, and its scope has varied by region and source. In North America, rock tripe was known primarily as a famine food, eaten by Cree, Inuit, and other Indigenous peoples and later by European explorers and voyageurs during periods of extreme scarcity. In East Asia, by contrast, Umbilicaria esculenta has been valued as a delicacy in Japanese, Korean, and Chinese cuisine since at least the 17th century. The English name derives from the Canadian French expression tripe de roche.

Rock tripe requires extensive processing, typically soaking and repeated boiling, to reduce bitter secondary metabolites such as gyrophoric acid that otherwise cause severe gastrointestinal distress. The principal carbohydrate in Umbilicaria is pustulan, which humans digest poorly, so the lichens provide less usable nourishment than their dry mass might suggest. They also contain bitter secondary metabolites, especially gyrophoric acid, which may help explain the nausea and bowel complaints described in historical accounts. Rock tripe is best known in Western historical writing for its role during John Franklin's disastrous overland Arctic expedition of 1819–1822, when it was one of the few available foods as the party retreated across the Barren Grounds. Because Umbilicaria lichens grow very slowly, heavy harvesting can deplete local populations for long periods.

== Terminology ==
Historical lexicography defines rock tripe as an edible lichen of the genus Umbilicaria, or less often of the former genus Gyrophora. The same source describes the lichen as having a leathery thallus (body) attached to rock by a threadlike holdfast (anchoring structure). The English name derives from Canadian French tripe de roche. Because the term is a common name rather than a formal taxonomic one, it has been used somewhat loosely in historical writing.

== Lichens involved ==
The lichens most often meant by "rock tripe" are species of Umbilicaria, foliose (leafy) lichens attached to exposed rock by a central umbilicus. In North American food and expedition accounts, however, the lichen is often mentioned without precise species identification. A well-documented food species is U. esculenta, known as an edible lichen in Japan, Korea, and China. The names iwatake in Japan, seogi in Korea, and shí'ěr in China have been used for that species. In British and European usage, the closely related genus Lasallia is also sometimes included under the name, while in North America species of Lasallia are more often distinguished as "toadskin" lichens.

== Use as food ==
=== North America ===
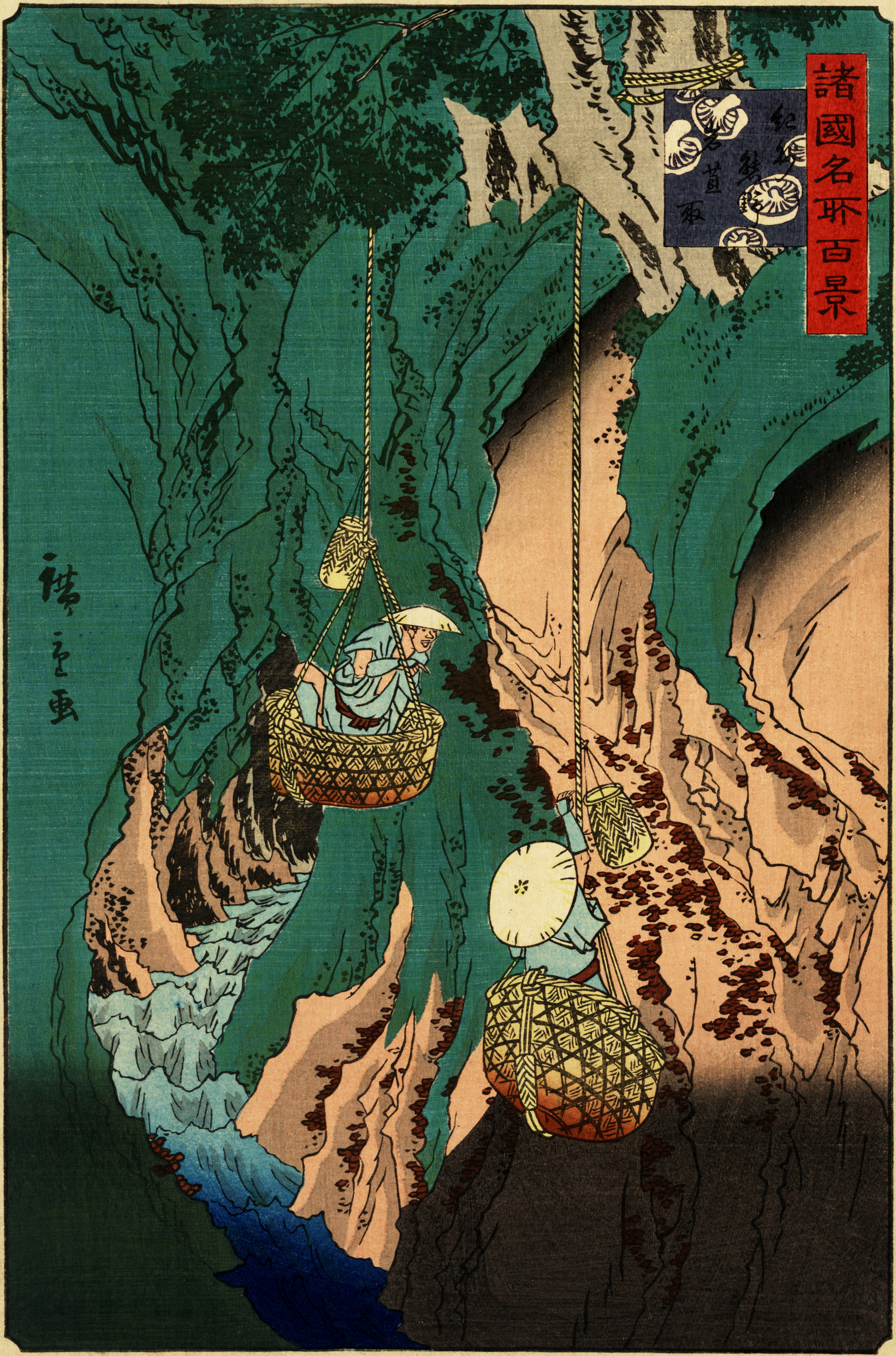
Gathering iwatake lichen at Kumano in Kii Province, from Utagawa Hiroshige II's One Hundred Famous Views in the Various Provinces (1860)

In North America, rock tripe was mainly a fallback food rather than a preferred staple, and Turner and Davis listed it among the famine foods of northwestern North America. It was eaten by Cree, Chipewyan, Inuit, and other Indigenous peoples. In northern Saskatchewan, the Western Woods Cree used rock tripe as a thickener for stews and gravies. Preparation typically involved gathering the lichen from rocks, washing it, breaking it into pieces, and boiling it in soups or broths; it was combined with fish, fish roe, or caribou blood, and one account describes "stone moss" being boiled with flour, lard, and salt. Indigenous people later introduced rock tripe to European explorers, Jesuit missionaries, and voyageurs in the Canadian subarctic, where it became a recognized, if dreaded, emergency food during periods of severe shortage. Turner and Davis associated its use with severe gastrointestinal pain.

=== East Asia ===
In East Asia, by contrast, U. esculenta has long been treated as food in its own right rather than merely as an emergency ration. A 1643 Japanese cookbook, Ryōri Monogatari, already mentions it. In East Asia it is known as iwatake or wawatake and has been described as a delicacy used in dishes such as salads, soups, and fried preparations. Isao Yoshimura noted that Umbilicaria esculenta had long been known in Japan by the name iwatake, literally "rock mushroom", and that people were already using it as food well before Miyoshi formally described the species in 1893. He also recorded a southern Kyushu name, gantare-naba, meaning 'false mushroom'. Evgeny Davydov and Yoshihito Ohmura also recorded the Korean name seogi and the Chinese name shí'ěr for the same species. According to Yoshimura, early Japanese culinary literature included recipes for iwatake, including preparations boiled with sugar and soy, teacakes, and dishes made after scalding it with hot water. The difficulty and danger of gathering iwatake from cliff faces made it a subject of popular interest in Edo-period Japan. Utagawa Hiroshige II's 1860 woodblock print Iwatake Gathering at Kumano in Kishū, from the series One Hundred Famous Views in the Various Provinces, depicts collectors suspended on ropes over a gorge, scraping the lichen from vertical rock walls with long-handled tools.

Rock tripe lichens are extremely slow-growing. In a study of four Umbilicaria species colonizing a Norwegian glacier foreland over 240 years, radial growth rates ranged from 0.9 to 2.4 mm per year, and individual thalli took 50 to 80 years from establishment to first reproduction. A modestly sized specimen may therefore represent decades of growth, and harvested populations cannot regenerate quickly. Yoshimura noted that iwatake had become increasingly scarce in its traditional Japanese harvesting areas by the late 20th century.

== Expedition and survival use ==
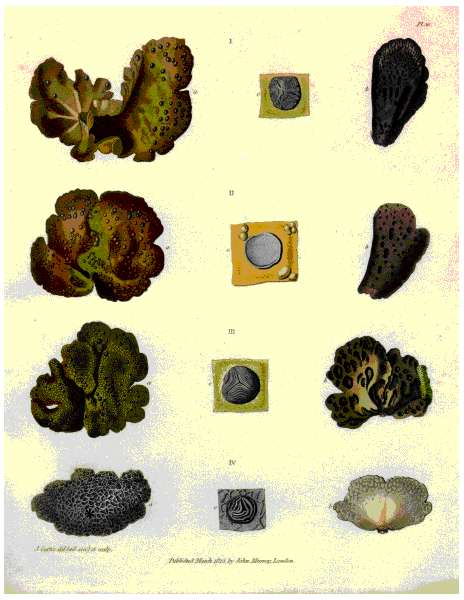
Lichens (tripe de roche) of the type eaten by Franklin's party in the absence of any other food

Rock tripe is closely associated in historical writing with John Franklin's overland Arctic expedition of 1819 to 1822, during which 11 of approximately 20 members of the return party died. Franklin recorded gathering tripe de roche on the march and eating it when more substantial food was unavailable. At one point the party's only meal consisted of partridge mixed with tripe de roche. As the retreat across the Barren Grounds continued, Franklin described the lichen as an "unpalatable weed" that had become "quite nauseous" to the whole party, and reported that it produced bowel complaints in several men. When no tripe de roche could be found at all, the party resorted to drinking tea and eating pieces of their shoes.

The expedition's surgeon-naturalist, John Richardson, contributed a botanical appendix to Franklin's published Narrative that included scientific descriptions of the lichens the party had collected and eaten. A specimen of tripe de roche from the expedition survives in the collections of the National Maritime Museum, Greenwich, with a handwritten label by George Back: "In 1821, for several days, I had no other food than Tripe de Roche and scraps of leather".

In Nicolas Perrot's earlier account of the Great Lakes fur trade, Algonquian families were said to depend on what the French called tripe de roche during periods when hunting failed. The lichen remained a recognized, if dreaded, emergency food among French-Canadian voyageurs and other northern travellers through the 19th century. Later scholarship notes that the gastrointestinal distress rock tripe caused could worsen the condition of people already weakened by hunger.

== Preparation and food value ==
Rock tripe required considerable processing before it could be eaten. Historical and ethnobotanical accounts describe it as being cleaned and then boiled, often after being broken into pieces or mixed with other foods. Soloway wrote that boiling could make it mucilaginous (thick and jelly-like) or gelatinous, and that opinions on its palatability varied. The available sources do not support treating rock tripe as a rich staple food; instead, they present it chiefly as a soup ingredient, supplement, or starvation food that could help stretch scarce rations. A review of ethnolichenological records noted that among the Nihithawak Cree, Umbilicaria mammulata was made into a soup for sick people because it was considered easy on the stomach; the lichen was cleaned, broken into small pieces, scalded with very hot water, and then cooked briefly in fish broth, which thickened as it cooled. Reports of nausea, bowel complaints, and other gastrointestinal distress recur in both historical and later secondary accounts.

The nutritional limitations and digestive problems associated with rock tripe are partly explained by the lichen's unusual carbohydrate chemistry. The principal carbohydrate in Umbilicaria species is pustulan, a β-1,6-linked glucan found throughout the family Umbilicariaceae. Humans lack the enzymes needed to break down this polysaccharide in the small intestine, so the energy the body can extract from rock tripe is much less than the gross caloric content of the dried lichen might suggest. Certain colonic bacteria, notably Bacteroides uniformis, can partially ferment pustulan, but the energy yield from colonic fermentation is substantially lower than from ordinary digestion of starch. Umbilicaria lichens also contain depsides and other secondary metabolites, particularly gyrophoric acid, which are bitter and act as digestive irritants; these compounds account for the nausea and bowel complaints recorded by Franklin and other historical observers. Thorough soaking and repeated boiling help leach these substances from the thallus, which is why all documented preparation traditions emphasize extended processing.
