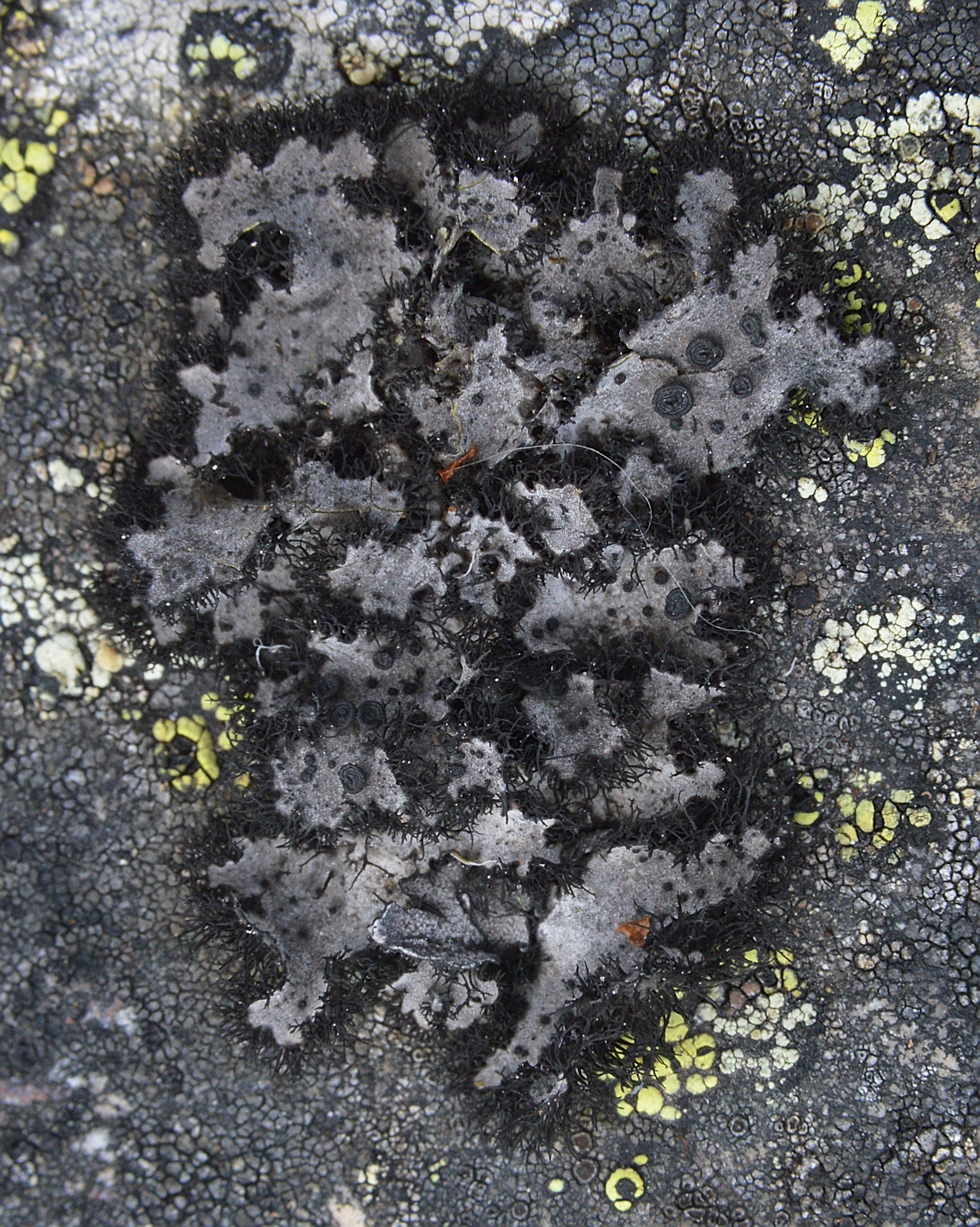

Conservation status
- Secure (NatureServe)

Scientific classification
- Kingdom: Fungi
- Division: Ascomycota
- Class: Lecanoromycetes
- Order: Umbilicariales
- Family: Umbilicariaceae
- Genus: Umbilicaria
- Species: U. cylindrica

Binomial name
- Umbilicaria cylindrica (L.) Delise (1830)

Synonyms
- List: Lichen cylindricus L. (1753); Gyrophora cylindrica (L.) Ach. (1803); Gyromium cylindricum (L.) Wahlenb. (1812); Gyrophora proboscidea var. cylindrica (L.) W.Mann (1825); Umbilicaria polymorpha var. cylindrica (L.) Schaer. (1826); Lecidea polymorpha var. cylindrica (L.) Spreng. (1827); Graphis cylindrica (L.) Wallr. (1831); Umbilicaria proboscidea var. cylindrica (L.) Fr. 1831); Gyrophora polymorpha a cylindrica (L.) Rabenh. (1845); Lecidea cylindrica (L.) Colla (1852); Lichen crinitus Lightf. (1777); Umbilicaria crinita Hoffm. (1794); Lichen proboscideus Huds. (1778); Lichen corneus var. laciniatus Retz. (1779); Gyrophora polymorpha f. crinita (Hoffm.) Schaer. (1817); Gyrophora crinita (Hoffm.) Chevall. (1826); Gyrophora cylindrica var. denticulata Ach. (1803); Gyrophora denticulata (Ach.) Flörke (1810); Gyrophora polymorpha f. denticulata (Ach.) Schaer. (1818); Gyrophora proboscidea var. denticulata (Ach.) Turner & Borrer (1839); Umbilicaria polymorpha f. denticulata (Ach.) Schaer. (1850); Umbilicaria varia f. denticulata (Ach.) Leight. (1856); Gyrophora cylindrica f. denticulata (Ach.) Mudd (1861); Umbilicaria cylindrica f. denticulata (Ach.) Leight. (1871)

= Umbilicaria cylindrica =

Species of lichen-forming fungus

Umbilicaria cylindrica, commonly known as the fringed rock tripe, is a leafy lichen found in cold, high-altitude and polar regions across the globe. It forms roughly circular thalli measuring between 2–10 centimetres and is easily recognised with a dark upper surface bordered by a fringe of fine, hair-like projections. As one of the first colonisers of bare rock, it paves the way for more complex communities in areas exposed to intense ultraviolet light. The species is particularly abundant in Arctic–alpine environments, where it can form extensive patches on exposed boulders and rock outcrops.

First described scientifically by Carl Linnaeus in 1753, the species has undergone several reclassifications as researchers have explored its varied appearances and chemical traits. While many names have been historically assigned to its various forms, current studies show that these differences are simply variations within one highly variable species. Essential for identification are its maze-like reproductive discs (apothecia) and its distinctive three-layered internal structure. The species exhibits considerable morphological plasticity, with variations in thallus size, colour, and surface texture documented across its range.

Beyond its biological appeal,Umbilicaria cylindrica serves an important ecological function. As a pioneer coloniser of rocky surfaces, it contributes to soil formation and creates a microhabitat for specialised fungi and other organisms. Because it absorbs pollutants like heavy metals and radioactive particles directly from the air, this lichen serves as a natural indicator of environmental quality, especially in remote alpine and Arctic areas. Its effectiveness as a biomonitor has made it useful for tracking long-term environmental changes, particularly in regions affected by industrial emissions and nuclear fallout.

== Taxonomy ==
The species was first scientifically described by the Swedish taxonomist Carl Linnaeus, who classified it as a member of the eponymous genus Lichen. In his original 1753 diagnosis, Linnaeus characterised the species as a leafy lichen with distinctive ciliate margins and cylindrical, perforated fruiting bodies marked by a "double circle" pattern—referring to the gyrose pattern on the apothecia that remains a key diagnostic feature today. He noted its occurrence in both Pennsylvania and Lapland, demonstrating an early recognition of its broad geographic distribution. These core morphological features that Linnaeus identified—the hairy margins and the distinctive fruiting bodies—continue to be central to the species' identification. The original type specimen, collected in Sweden, is kept in the Linnaean Herbarium in London. In 1830, the French botanist Dominique François Delise reclassified the species into the genus Umbilicaria, establishing the binomial name it is known by today. The species underwent extensive taxonomic revision throughout the nineteenth century, during which European lichenologists proposed numerous transfers between genera and dozens of infraspecific taxa—forms, varieties, and subspecies—based on morphological variations. In his 1950 monograph on Umbilicariaceae in the Western Hemisphere, George Llano noted "The overall characteristics of this very polymorphous species cannot be wholly appreciated on the examination of a few specimens. He then provided a key to varieties and forms of U. cylindrica, which contained 13 entries, and further noted that this list did not cover the entirety of variation documented in this species. While these historical names remain in the nomenclatural record, none are now considered taxonomically distinct from the typical form. These include var. fimbriata (characterised by abundant dark bristles spread in all directions) and var. denticulata (with thallus-coloured bristles lying in the same plane).

The taxonomic placement and classification of U. cylindrica has undergone several revisions over time. In their 1993 monograph on Asian Umbilicariaceae, Jian-chun Wei and Yu-mei Jiang re-evaluated previous taxonomic misapplications of Umbilicaria cylindrica and introduced the epithet U. neocylindrica for specimens that had been erroneously referred to as U. cylindrica in some sources. They observed that this misapplication primarily affected Asian collections and that U. neocylindrica was morphologically similar to U. umbilicarioides. However, U. cylindrica itself can be distinguished from U. umbilicarioides by the absence of thalloconidia and the presence of conspicuous papillae on its lower surface. While U. neocylindrica was proposed to clarify nomenclatural inconsistencies, it has not been widely adopted in global taxonomic frameworks and is not recognised as a distinct species in recent phylogenetic analyses of Umbilicaria.

The species shows significant morphological, chemical, and genetic variation throughout its circumpolar range. Studies have shown considerable enzyme polymorphism and morphological differences between populations, demonstrating the species' adaptability across its distribution. Studies have documented up to six varieties from the Iberian Peninsula and five from the Tatra Mountains in Poland, distinguished by features such as rhizine density, surface texture, and thallus colouration.

The phylogenetic relationships of U. cylindrica were clarified in a 2017 molecular study by Davydov and colleagues. Their analysis placed U. cylindrica within "Clade 3" (subgenus Umbilicaria), where it forms part of the U. cylindrica group alongside several close relatives including U. altaiensis, U. dendrophora, U. maculata, and U. umbilicarioides. This group is characterised by having an elevated pruinose or reticulate-ridged centre on the upper surface of the thallus. Studies have revealed variations among specimens in chemical composition, particularly in the quantities of gyrophoric and lecanoric acids, as well as differences in morphological and physiological characteristics. The species within this group are typically distributed in high mountainous and subpolar regions, occurring either throughout both hemispheres or restricted to the Holarctic region.

Umbilicaria cylindrica is commonly known as the "fringed rock tripe" in North America.

== Description ==
Umbilicaria cylindrica has a leaf-like thallus that reaches 2–10 cm in diameter, though most specimens are smaller than 4 cm across. One specimen, originally documented as the variety delisei, was recorded at a diameter of 26 cm. The thallus consists of multiple lobes that may be either smoothly rounded or irregularly jagged, and sometimes contain small holes. The upper surface ranges in colour from dark brown to dark grey or black, and may be covered in places with a grey, powdery coating. Its texture can be smooth or slightly rough with tiny, map-like cracks. Inside, the thallus has a distinctive three-layered medulla: a loosely arranged, web-like (arachnoidal) outer layer, a dense plectenchymatic central core, and another web-like layer beneath. The internal structure of the thallus contains a distinctive three-layered medulla (inner tissue): an upper web-like layer beneath the algal zone, a dense central layer where fungal threads are tightly packed in parallel, and a lower web-like layer connecting to the bottom surface. This "decussata-type" medullary structure is characteristic of the species. This structure allows the thallus to store a moderate amount of water, with approximately 20% of its volume consisting of pore spaces.

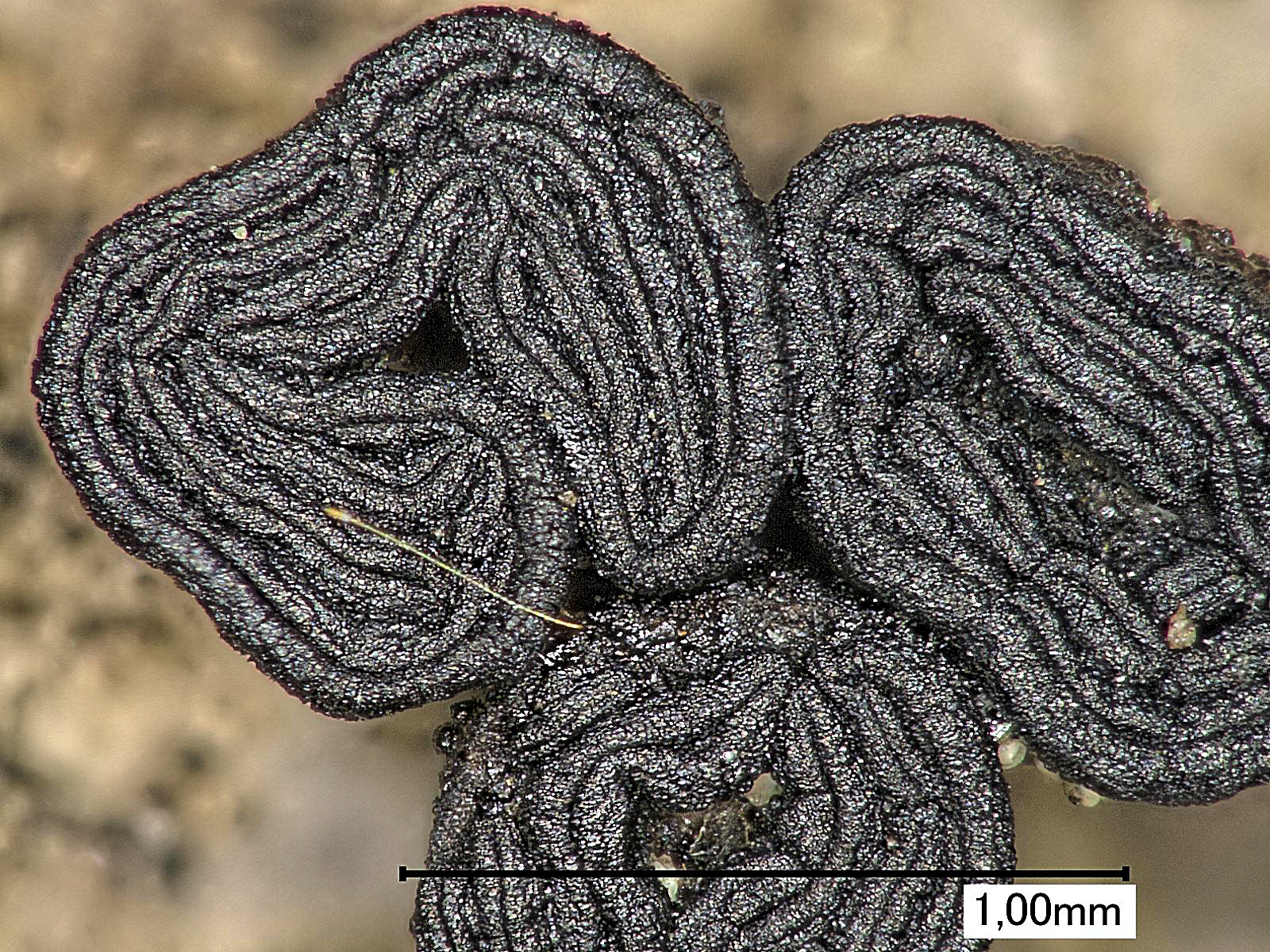
Closeup of the gyrose (maze-like) pattern on black apothecia

The reproductive structures (apothecia) are distinctive and numerous, appearing as black, slightly raised discs 0.5–2.0 (rarely up to 4.0) mm in diameter. These structures have a gyrose (maze-like) pattern on their surface and are elevated above the thallus on short stalks, with margins that are either smooth or slightly cracked. Early studies of this species' reproductive structures were conducted by Gustav Lindau in the late 19th century, who documented the development of apothecia near the centre of the thallus, a few millimetres inward from the marginal pycnidia. He observed that the initial stages of apothecial development occur below the algal layer, where densely packed hyphae form a coiled structure that later develops upward through the thallus layers. While Lindau interpreted the emerging hyphal bundles as mechanical boring structures, other lichenologists of the era, such as Wilhelm Baur, considered them to be early paraphyses—a debate that reflected the period's limited understanding of lichen reproduction.

The underside of the lichen is typically beige-brown or pinkish, though occasionally grey, with darker colouration near its central attachment point (umbilicus). The lower surface is smooth in texture, hosting scattered to densely packed root-like structures (rhizines) that match its colour. These rhizines are cylindrical and either simple or slightly branched. While generally smooth, older specimens may develop slight cracking patterns near this central area. One of the most distinctive features of this species is its abundant simple to branched root-like structures (rhizinomorphs) that protrude from both the upper and lower surfaces, particularly along the edges. These dark, glossy projections are 1–4 mm long and usually branch into multiple segments. They start flat where they attach to the lichen body before becoming cylindrical and tapering to a point, sometimes developing small knob-like growths.

When reproducing sexually, it produces simple elliptical spores measuring 12–18 by 5–9 micrometres (μm). It can also reproduce asexually through smaller, rod-shaped structures (conidia) that measure 3–4 by 0.5–0.7 μm, though it rarely produces other types of vegetative reproductive structures.

== Development ==
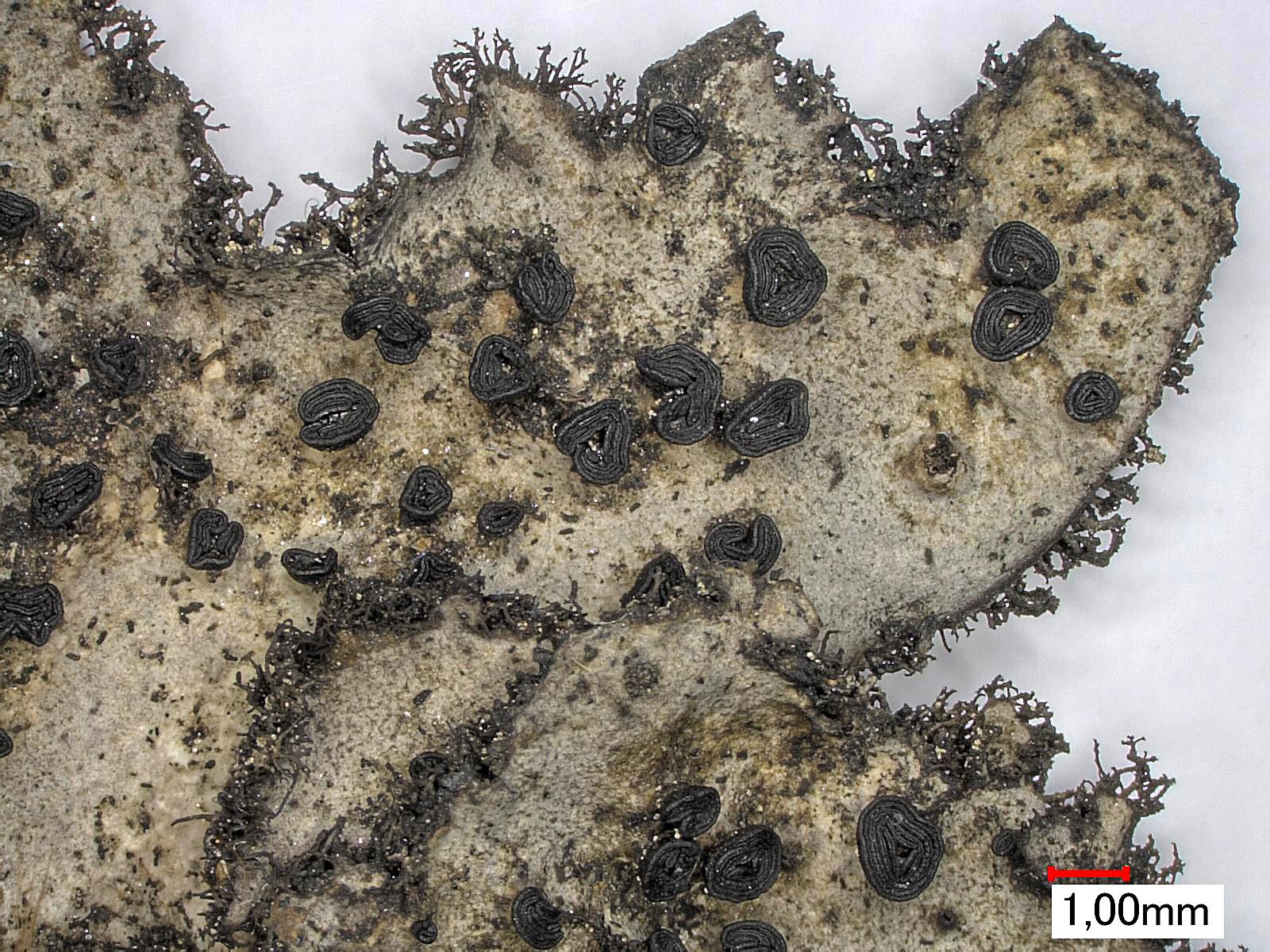
Upper surface of U. cylindrica herbarium specimen showing numerous black gyrose apothecia and branched marginal cilia

Umbilicaria cylindrica develops through an unusual growth pattern: rather than expanding from the margins as might be expected, new thallus lobes form on top of existing ones. This development process involves both the main body (thallus) and its characteristic appendages. This process typically begins when the outer layer breaks, either at weak points where algal cells penetrate the surface, or through complete tissue degeneration that creates holes through which new growth can emerge.

The species' distinctive hair-like appendages – both the marginal cilia and the root-like rhizinomorphs – develop from the outer cortex tissue and are fundamentally the same structures, differing only in their location on the thallus. Their growth is connected to the development of the thallus's powdery surface coating (pruina). Though appearing quite different, studies have shown there is no developmental difference between the marginal cilia and the rhizinomorphs on the lower surface.

These appendages form primarily in areas of active growth rather than randomly across the thallus. They are commonly found around breaks and holes in the thallus, along the edges of new lobes, and surrounding fruiting bodies. This pattern of development contradicts earlier theories that suggested the rhizinomorphs found on the upper surface were simply misoriented lower surface structures that had grown through the thallus.

The distinctive maze-like (gyrose) pattern of the apothecia develops through an unusual growth process: the fertile tissue containing the asci grows outward toward the edge of the disc, leaving a weak central area that becomes filled with sterile tissue (paraphyses). This process repeats multiple times, creating concentric alternating bands of fertile and sterile tissue that form the characteristic gyrose pattern. The tips of the paraphyses become blackened, contributing to the dark appearance of mature apothecia. Spore production occurs only in later stages of development, after the fertile tissue has stabilised.

== Chemistry ==
The lichen produces several classes of secondary metabolites, including tridepsides, depsidones, and orcinol derivatives. The predominant compound is the tridepside gyrophoric acid, typically accompanied by smaller amounts of its biosynthetic precursor, lecanoric acid. Other metabolites detected in U. cylindrica include umbilicaric acid (a 2-O-methylated derivative of gyrophoric acid), ovoic acid, and hiascic acid.

Analysis using high-performance liquid chromatography (HPLC) has revealed more chemical variability than earlier microchemical studies had suggested. While gyrophoric acid is consistently found in the species, some specimens contain only trace amounts, making detection challenging in smaller samples. Studies have also shown geographic variation in secondary metabolite production, with some U. cylindrica populations displaying different ratios of gyrophoric acid to its derivatives.

Additionally, HPLC analyses suggest that minor metabolites, such as crustinic acid (a hydroxylated tridepside) and methylated gyrophoric acid derivatives, may be present in trace amounts, though they are often masked by the high concentration of gyrophoric acid in most specimens.

The lichen's extracts have demonstrated antioxidant properties, particularly due to the hydroxyl-rich structure of gyrophoric acid. Some studies have also identified antimicrobial activity against bacteria and fungi, attributed to the presence of usnic acid and other phenolic compounds.

== Similar species ==
Umbilicaria cylindrica can be identified by its unique, tassel-like rhizinomorphs, which set it apart from similar species. These root-like structures are relatively long and partially flattened, extending from jagged lobe edges in a manner reminiscent of decorative tassels on a rug. They have a smooth texture and lack specialised reproductive granules (thalloconidia).

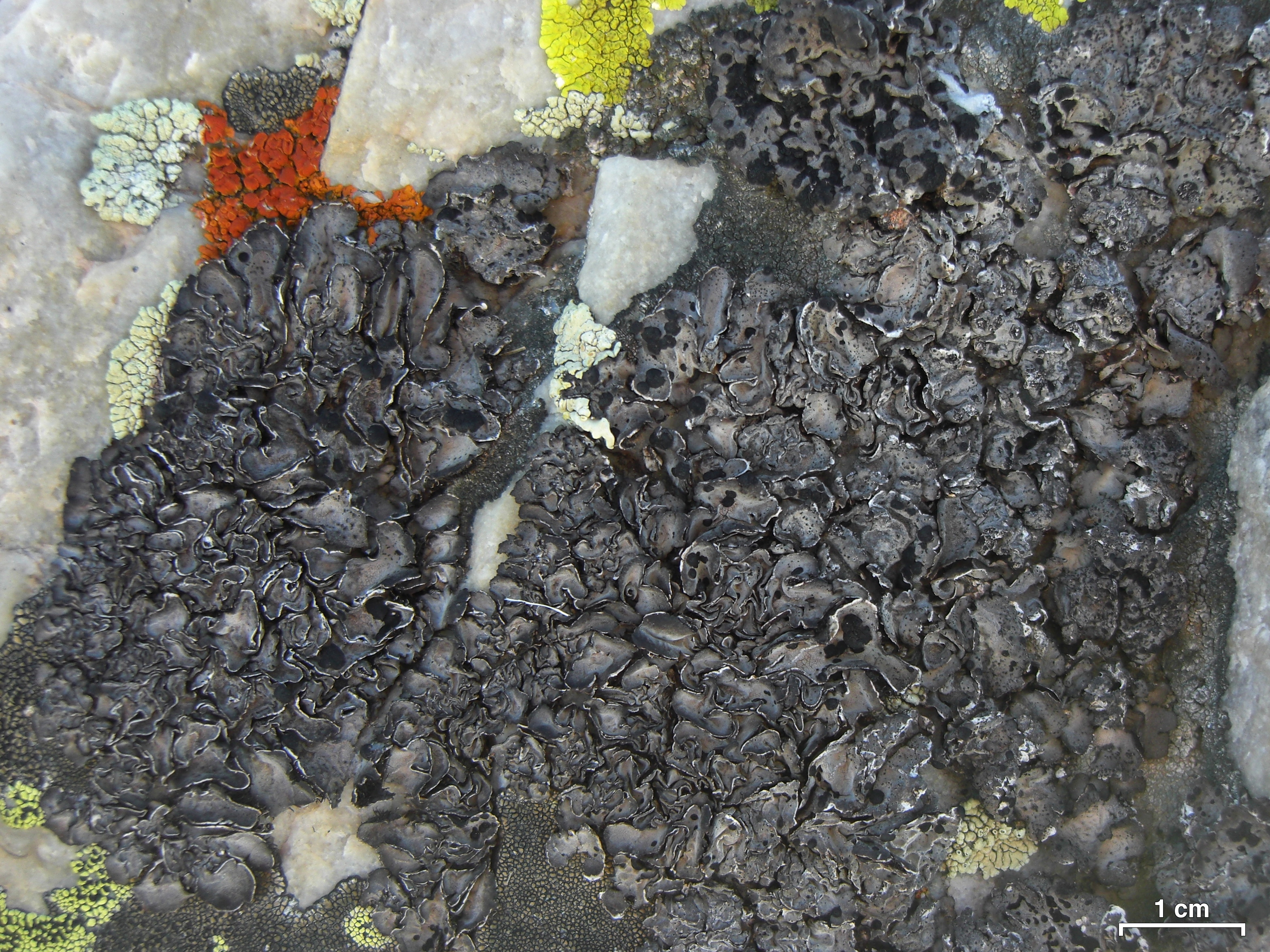
Umbilicaria virginis (pictured as the dominant, dark foliose lichen amongst other saxicolous species) can be distinguished from U. cylindrica by its smooth (not gyrose) apothecia.

The most similar species is U. umbilicarioides, which can be challenging to differentiate, especially as the two species often grow together in the same habitat. U. umbilicarioides has shorter rhizinomorphs (typically no longer than 1.5 mm) that branch densely in a bush-like or coral-like pattern. These structures create a distinctive shrub-like fringe where they emerge abruptly from the lichen lobes, and can be identified by their clusters of reproductive granules. These species frequently grow together, making it common to find both intermixed in herbarium specimens. Another similar species is U. maculata, which can be distinguished by its shorter rhizinomorphs, sessile (unstalked) apothecia with a distinctive pattern of sterile fissures, and upper surface that often displays white stains or mottling. While U. virginis also features projecting rhizines similar to U. cylindrica, it can be distinguished by its smooth disc, which contrasts with U. cylindrica's gyrose pattern. Additionally, U. virginis's medulla produces a red reaction when tested with C and KC chemicals, indicating the presence of gyrophoric acid – a compound that is absent in U. cylindrica. The superficially similar Dermatocarpon miniatum, which grows on limestone rather than silicate rocks, lacks bristles and has sunken rather than raised fruiting bodies.

== Habitat and distribution ==
Umbilicaria cylindrica is an Arctic–alpine lichen found on exposed rocky surfaces in cold, mountainous regions. It prefers siliceous (acidic) rocks such as granite and basalt, and typically grows in the alpine vegetation zone above treeline. Thalli are usually located on windswept boulders and outcrops with only a brief seasonal snow cover, often near mountaintops. In the Alps, it occurs from subalpine elevations around 1000 m up to the nival zone, with records from as high as 4270 m on the Finsteraarhorn. This lichen tolerates extreme climatic conditions of high UV exposure, frequent freeze-thaw cycles, and desiccation typical of alpine and polar environments. In Greenland, the species shows an unusual altitudinal distribution pattern: while typically found at high elevations elsewhere, it is scarce in continental highlands and lower coastal areas due to the desiccating effects of frequent Foehn winds. However, it persists at higher coastal altitudes up to 1600 m where these warm, dry winds have less impact. Rather than acting as a pioneer species in these locations, it functions more as a specialist coloniser of protected ecological niches.

Umbilicaria cylindrica has a circumpolar distribution across the Northern Hemisphere and is widespread in arctic and boreal-alpine regions. It is recorded in North America, Europe, and Asia, where it is very common in alpine areas of these continents. For instance, it occurs from northern Scandinavia and Russia (Arctic tundra) to the high mountain ranges of central Europe (e.g. Alps, Carpathians) and Asia. It is also found at high elevations in the Himalayas. In the western Himalaya, it has been recorded from the Nandi Kund area in the Madhyamaheshwar Valley (Uttarakhand, India), where it occurs at high elevations around 4,800 m on exposed rock and soil. Beyond its primary Holarctic range, U. cylindrica has been reported in temperate parts of the Southern Hemisphere: in Australasia (high-altitude sites in Tasmania, southeastern Australia, and New Zealand).

== Ecology ==
In its alpine habitats, U. cylindrica often grows as part of lichen-dominated communities on bare rock. It is a pioneer species on newly exposed substrates (such as glacier forefields), helping initiate soil formation and ecosystem succession on barren rock. Its tolerance for harsh conditions allows it to colonize surfaces that few other organisms can, and mature thalli can persist for decades, slowly expanding and often dominating the microhabitat. On sun-exposed, wind-blasted ridges and plateaus, U. cylindrica frequently co-occurs with other hardy lichens (e.g. species of Cetraria, Stereocaulon, Rhizocarpon) and bryophytes, although total vegetation cover remains sparse. In Arctic sites, it can be among the most abundant foliose lichens on relatively flat rock surfaces (reaching about 5–8% cover in some lichen communities).

Umbilicaria cylindrica is known to host specialised parasitic or commensal fungi (lichenicolous fungi) that grow on or within its thallus. Several species have been documented on U. cylindrica. For example, the fungus Stigmidium gyrophorarum infects the thallus of U. cylindrica, forming tiny black perithecia on its surface. The species is also host to Lichenostigma epiumbilicariae, a lichenicolous fungus that forms distinctive dark superficial hyphal cords on the upper surface of the thallus. While this fungus specifically targets U. cylindrica and other Umbilicaria species, it appears to cause no appreciable damage to the host lichen's tissues, with the fungal growth limited to the dead superficial layer (epinecral layer) of the upper cortex. Straminella printzenii is a lichenicolous lichen (a lichen that lives on other lichens) known from Europe; its type host is U. cylindrica.

On rock surfaces, U. cylindrica competes with other lichens and algae for space and light. Its thick, leathery thallus and tolerance of extreme exposure give it an advantage on open, horizontal surfaces with intense sunlight and wind. In contrast, it is absent from shaded overhangs or vertical cliff faces, where other Umbilicaria species (e.g. U. decussata) or orange crustose lichens might dominate. This suggests niche partitioning: U. cylindrica grows on top surfaces and gentle slopes, whereas certain relatives and competitors occupy steeper or shaded niches. When in direct contact, U. cylindrica's slow growth means it can be overgrown at the edges by faster-spreading lichens or mosses, especially if environmental conditions become less extreme. Nonetheless, in its favoured alpine settings with high stress (freeze-thaw, high light), it experiences relatively little competition and can form near-monospecific lichen patches on rock.

== Biomonitoring ==
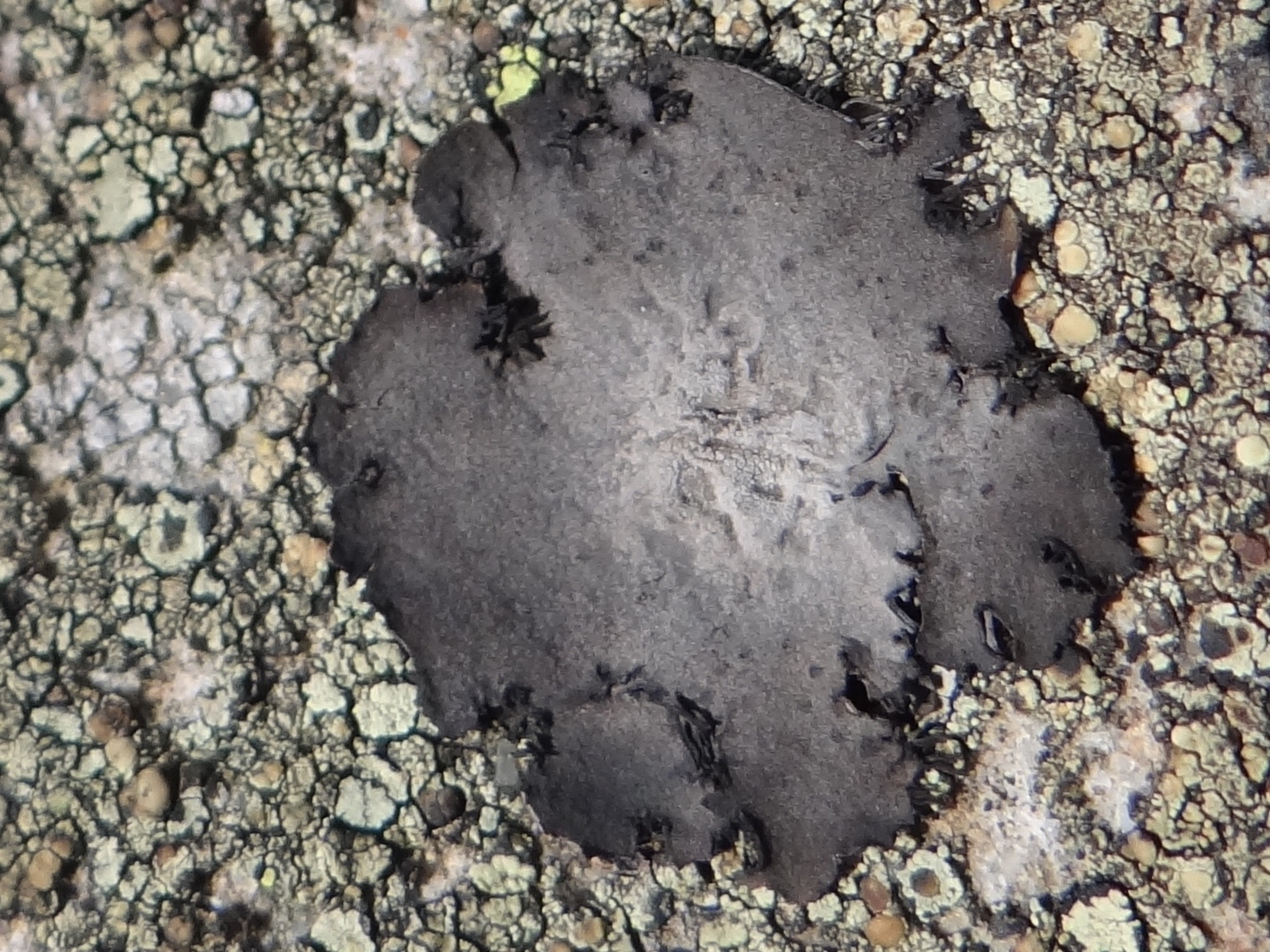
This U. cylindrica individual photographed in Poland is growing amongst a community of saxicolous lichens

As a rootless organism that absorbs nutrients directly from the atmosphere through rain, dust, and air, Umbilicaria cylindrica serves as an effective bioindicator of air quality and environmental pollution. Pollutants accumulate in its tissues over time, making it valuable for environmental monitoring. Its widespread distribution and capacity to sequester heavy metals and other contaminants make it a valuable natural monitor. Researchers have analyzed U. cylindrica samples from various regions to infer pollution levels of metals, radionuclides, and other airborne chemicals. Because it is long-lived and stationary, the lichen provides a time-integrated record of deposition in a given location.

The thalli of Umbilicaria cylindrica from industrial and mining-impacted areas show elevated concentrations of metals such as lead (Pb), zinc (Zn), copper (Cu), chromium, and others. A study from the Sudety region of southwestern Poland found that several Umbilicaria species (including U. cylindrica) had accumulated significant amounts of Cr, Cu, Fe, Mn, Ni, Pb, and Zn, reflecting pollution from local industrial smelters. These lichens effectively trapped airborne metal particles, and their tissue analyses have been used to map and monitor the spatial distribution of heavy metal fallout. Such studies demonstrate that U. cylindrica can survive in moderate pollution levels while bioaccumulating contaminants, making it a useful heavy metals biomonitor.

The ability of U. cylindrica to uptake atmospheric particulates makes it useful for monitoring radioisotopes from nuclear fallout. When nuclear tests and accidents release radionuclides such as caesium-137 (^{137}Cs), these particles deposit onto soils and vegetation. In one study, Umbilicaria lichens in Poland were analyzed for ^{137}Cs content at different elevations. The results showed measurable ^{137}Cs in the lichen, with concentrations increasing at higher altitudes (where greater deposition occurred). This work demonstrated that U. cylindrica could serve as a natural dosimeter for radioactive pollution, integrating fallout over time in remote alpine areas. Long-term monitoring of radionuclides in Umbilicaria and other lichens has also been done in arctic regions and downwind of Chernobyl-affected areas, to gauge persistence of contamination.

Umbilicaria cylindrica has also been employed to track trends in air pollution over time. In the French Alps, researchers measured fluorine levels in U. cylindrica thalli during the late 20th century to assess the impact of a nearby aluminum smelter. Over a ten-year period (1975–1985), the fluorine content in the lichen significantly declined, reflecting reduced fluoride emissions and improving air quality in the valley. This marked one of the first demonstrations of lichens registering a decrease in pollution after industrial controls were implemented. More broadly, the presence and vitality of U. cylindrica in a given locale can indicate good air quality, since lichens are sensitive to sulphur dioxide and acid rain. U. cylindrica and other sensitive lichens flourish in pristine mountain air but show damage or disappear entirely in severely polluted regions. Thus, both the chemical content of U. cylindrica (for specific pollutants) and its biological health (growth, abundance) are used as indicators in environmental monitoring.

== Recognition ==
In 2018, U. cylindrica was selected as "Lichen of the Year" by the Bryologisch-lichenologische Arbeitsgemeinschaft für Mitteleuropa (BLAM), a Central European organisation dedicated to the study of bryophytes and lichens. The selection recognised the species as a typical inhabitant of high mountain environments and an early coloniser of bare rock.

== See also ==
- List of lichens named by Carl Linnaeus
