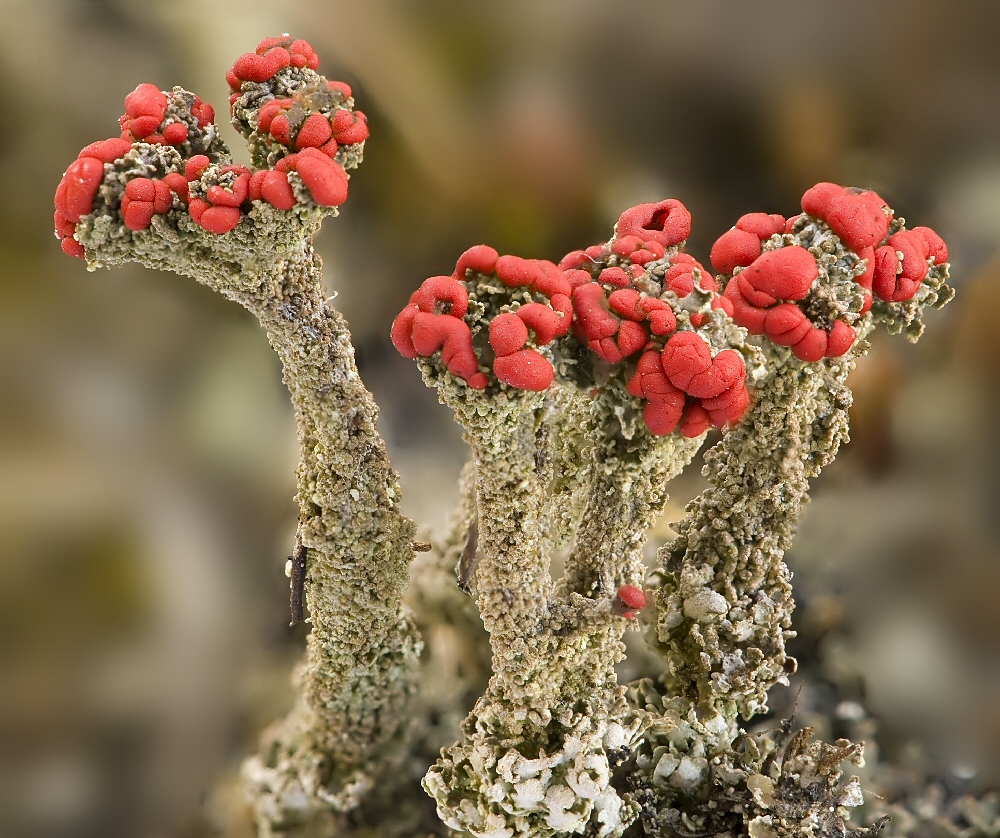

Conservation status
- Secure (NatureServe)

Scientific classification
- Kingdom: Fungi
- Division: Ascomycota
- Class: Lecanoromycetes
- Order: Lecanorales
- Family: Cladoniaceae
- Genus: Cladonia
- Species: C. floerkeana

Binomial name
- Cladonia floerkeana (Fr.) Flörke (1828)

Synonyms
- List: Cenomyce floerkeana Fr. (1824); Patellaria floerkeana (Fr.) Wallr. (1831); Cladonia bellidiflora var. floerkeana (Fr.) Schaer. (1833); Cladonia macilenta var. floerkeana (Fr.) M.Choisy (1951); Cladonia macilenta subsp. floerkeana (Fr.) R.Sant. (1993); Cladonia macilenta subsp. floerkeana (Fr.) V.Wirth (1994); Cenomyce carcata Ach. (1810); Cenomyce bacillaris f. carcata (Ach.) Ach. (1814); Cladonia macilenta var. carcata (Ach.) Nyl. (1861); Cladonia digitata f. carcata (Ach.) Leight. (1871); Cladonia floerkeana var. carcata (Ach.) Vain. (1887); Cladonia bacillaris var. carcata (Ach.) Nyl. (1889); Cladonia carcata (Ach.) Nyl. (1900); Cladonia macilenta f. carcata (Ach.) M.Choisy (1951); Cladonia floerkeana f. carcata (Ach.) J.W.Thomson (1968); Cladonia floerkeana var. intermedia Hepp (1853); Cladonia macilenta f. intermedia (Hepp) M.Choisy (1951); Cladonia floerkeana f. intermedia (Hepp) J.W.Thomson (1968); Cladonia floerkeana var. trachypoda Nyl. (1879); Cladonia macilenta subf. trachypoda (Nyl.) M.Choisy (1951)

= Cladonia floerkeana =

Species of lichen

Cladonia floerkeana is a species of fruticose lichen in the family Cladoniaceae. The species produces distinctive bright red spore-bearing structures (apothecia) on thin, upright stalks (podetia) that can be variably branched. These stalks may be smooth, rough, or covered in tiny scales. The species was first described by Elias Magnus Fries in 1824 as Cenomyce floerkeana and later transferred to the genus Cladonia by Heinrich Gustav Flörke in 1828. C. floerkeana is closely related to Cladonia macilenta, from which it is distinguished by its lack of soredia and its chemical properties. Commonly known as gritty British soldiers or Bengal match lichen, this species functions as a pioneer organism in nutrient-poor environments.

The lichen has a broad but patchy global distribution, occurring across Europe, North and South America, Africa, Asia, and Oceania, including Australasia. It grows in acidic soils and open habitats such as heathlands, boreal forests, and post-disturbance landscapes, but it is sensitive to nitrogen deposition and alkaline conditions. Cladonia floerkeana produces a range of secondary metabolites, including barbatic, didymic, and rhodocladonic acids, with some regional chemical variations. The species has considerable genetic diversity, owing to its heterothallic breeding system, and its podetial plasticity allows it to adapt to diverse and challenging environments.

== Taxonomy ==
Cladonia floerkeana was originally described as a new species in 1824 by Elias Magnus Fries, who classified it as a member of the genus Cenomyce. The German lichenologist Heinrich Gustav Flörke transferred the taxon to Cladonia in 1828. In his treatment, Flörke emphasised the lichen's distinctive scarlet apothecia, slender and elongated podetia that are occasionally branched or squamulose, and its preference for growing on soil in pine forests. He also noted its distribution in various parts of Europe, including Germany, Switzerland, France, and Sweden.

Cladonia floerkeana was originally associated with Cladonia macilenta, a closely related species within the Cladoniaceae. Historical taxonomic confusion arose because the original material of C. macilenta was later determined to belong to C. floerkeana. To resolve this issue and stabilise the use of both names, C. macilenta was conserved with a specific type that excluded C. floerkeana. This nomenclatural decision clarified their distinction and ensured consistent application of the names in modern lichenology.

The species epithet floerkeana honours the German botanist Heinrich Gustav Flörke. As a member of the genus Cladonia, the species is part of a diverse group of lichens characterised by their fruticose (shrub-like) growth forms and ecological importance as pioneer organisms.

Cladonia floerkeana is a member of clade Erythrocarpae, subclade Subglaucescentes, and closely related to Cladonia macilenta.

Common names that have been used for this species include "gritty British soldiers", and "Bengal match lichen".

== Description ==
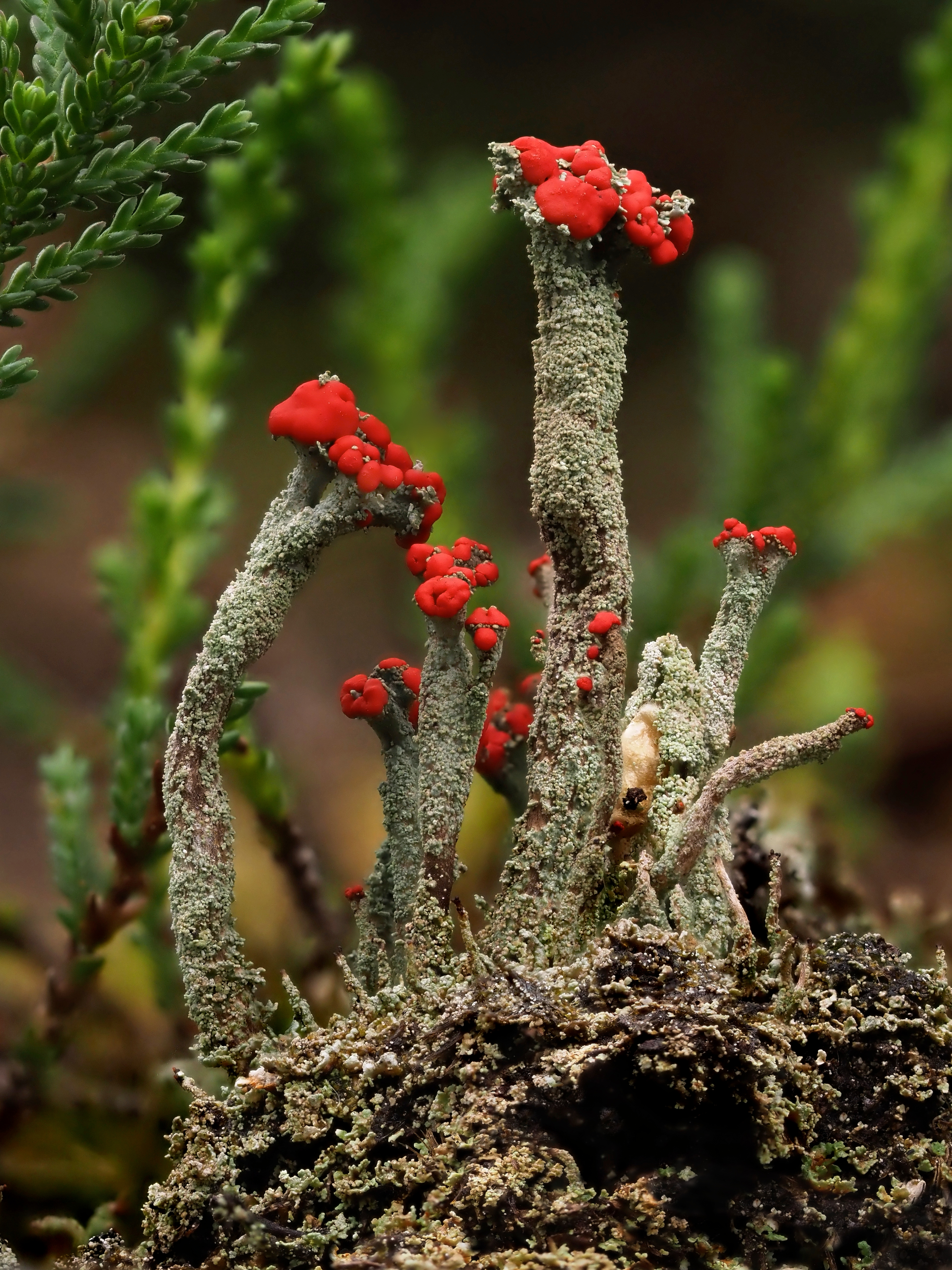
Cladonia floerkeana showing its characteristic red apothecia and slender, gray-green podetia in a natural habitat

The primary thallus of Cladonia floerkeana is persistent, made up of small, lobed squamules (scales) that measure 1–3 mm in length and 1–2 mm in width. These squamules are esorediate, meaning they lack powdery reproductive structures known as soredia. The basal squamules are small, persistent, and often inconspicuous, with an orange tinge toward the base of the lower surface. The secondary structures, or podetia, are frequent and grow up to 2 cm tall but are often shorter. They are pale to dark grey, with a brownish tinge in exposed sites. The podetia may remain unbranched or branch sparingly near the apices. Their surface is highly variable: they may be entirely corticate, partially decorticate (especially toward the apices), granular-sorediate in patches, or densely squamulose throughout. They have been described as resembling "scraggly white fingers with lumpy surfaces".

The surface of the podetia is usually corticate (covered in a thin fungal layer), with occasional granules or small scales. Microscopically, the podetial wall has several distinct layers: an upper cortex of densely packed hyphae, an algal layer containing round or shriveled algal cells loosely associated with hyphae, and a medullary layer made up of loosely interwoven hyphal threads forming a fibrous network. The development of soredia, non-corticated clumps of algae and hyphae, begins in the medulla and algal layers and proceeds through cracks in the cortex, providing a common method of vegetative propagation.

Cladonia floerkeana produces conidiomata (small asexual reproductive structures) typically on the primary squamules and occasionally at the tips of podetia. These structures are black, often with red areas around the opening (ostiole), and contain a characteristic red slime. The conidia (asexual spores) are falciform (curved) and measure 6–9 μm in length.

The lichen also frequently develops apothecia, saucer-shaped fruiting bodies, which range from 0.5–2.5 mm in diameter. Spores are oblong to spindle-shaped, measuring 8–14 by 2.5–3 μm.

The photobiont partner of C. floerkeana is the green algal species Asterochloris erici.

=== Chemistry ===
This species contains a variety of secondary metabolites. It consistently tests negative for the C and K chemical spot tests (P–, K–). It produces barbatic and didymic acids as major compounds, with the occasional presence of thamnolic acid. Rhodocladonic acid, a bright red pigment, is found in the hymenial tissues of apothecia. These compounds play roles in lichen defence and possibly in ecological signalling. Additional chemical spot tests reveal that Cladonia floerkeana is typically KC– and Pd–, with the ultraviolet test yielding UV± (blue). Rarely, the thallus reacts K+ (yellow) or K+ (purple) when orange pigments are present.

Regional chemical variation has been observed in Cladonia floerkeana. Finnish populations lack thamnolic acid and usnic acid; however, thamnolic acid has been detected in specimens from Sweden. In Poland, four distinct chemotypes of C. floerkeana have been identified, with variations in secondary metabolites. The most common chemotypes include barbatic acid (sometimes accompanied by 4-O-demethylbarbatic acid), with some populations also containing thamnolic and didymic acids. Rarely, usnic acid has been detected in conjunction with other compounds, reflecting both regional and environmental influences on the species' chemistry.

== Similar species ==
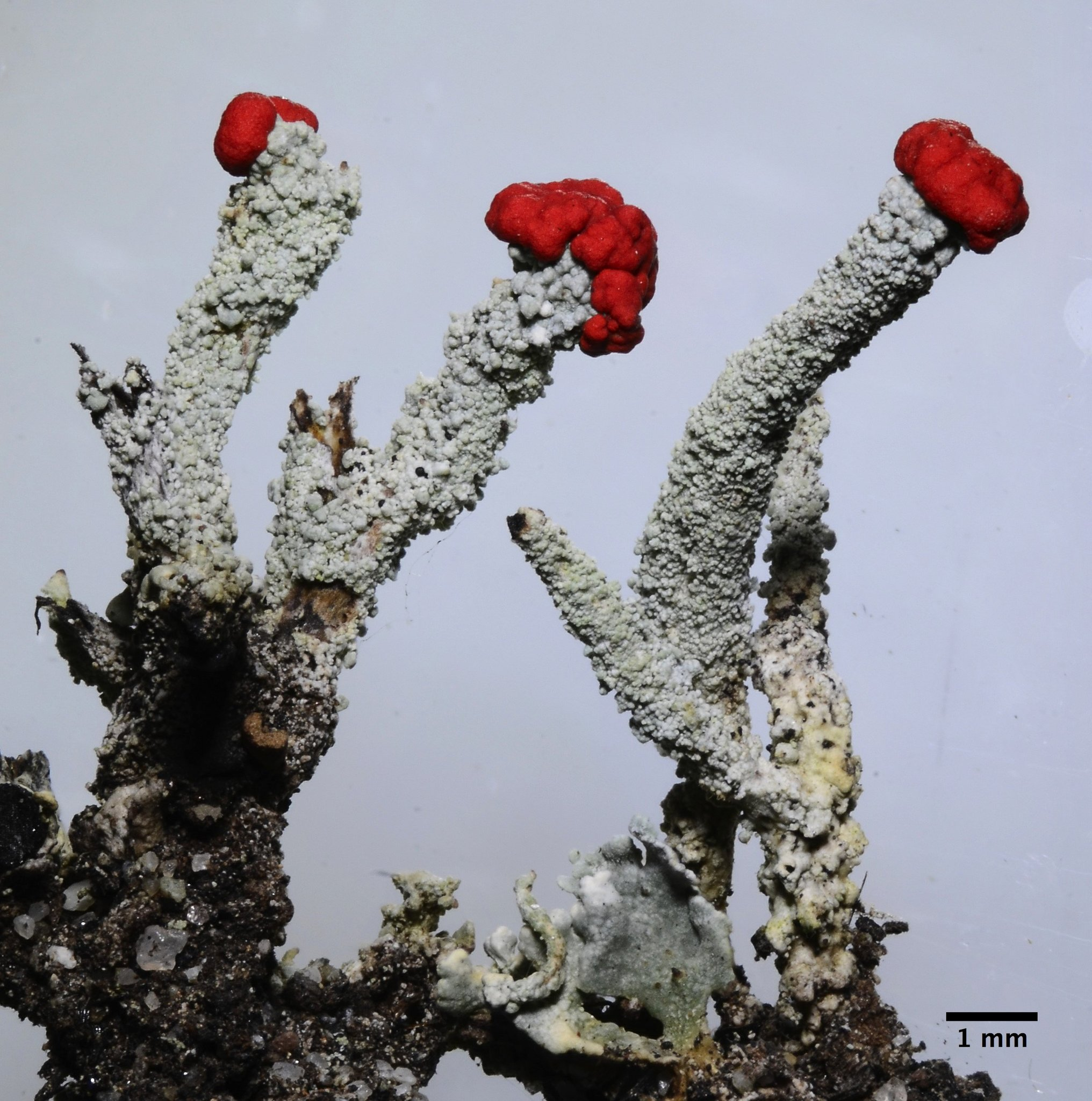
Cladonia macilenta, a lookalike species of C. floerkeana, featuring red apothecia and slender, sorediate podetia

Cladonia floerkeana closely resembles Cladonia macilenta (thin cup lichen), a species that often occurs in similar habitats and is part of the same Erythrocarpae clade. The two can be distinguished by their surface features and chemical reactions. Cladonia floerkeana typically lacks soredia and has highly variable podetia, which may be entirely corticate, partially decorticate, granular-sorediate in patches, or densely squamulose. In contrast, Cladonia macilenta is always at least partially finely sorediate and consistently reacts K+ (yellow). Although both species feature red apothecia, the sorediate podetia of C. macilenta often appear more finely structured. A rare lookalike, Cladonia alpina, is distinguished from Cladonia floerkeana by its taller podetia, the presence of farinose (mealy) to somewhat granular soredia, and the production of porphyrilic acid.

In nitrogen-rich environments, Cladonia floerkeana may be replaced by nitrogen-tolerant species such as Cladonia ramulosa. This species differs from C. floerkeana by producing larger, more extensively branched podetia and by lacking red apothecia. These ecological and morphological distinctions help differentiate the species in overlapping habitats.

== Reproductive biology ==
Genetic analyses of Cladonia floerkeana have revealed considerable genetic variation among sibling spores, indicating a heterothallic breeding system. This requires the presence of genetically distinct mating types for sexual reproduction, which fosters genetic diversity. Studies employing techniques like random amplification of polymorphic DNA and amplified fragment length polymorphism fingerprinting confirmed that spores produced by individual apothecia are not genetically uniform. This variation likely plays a key role in the species' ability to adapt to its environment and establish itself as a pioneer species in challenging habitats.

== Habitat and distribution ==
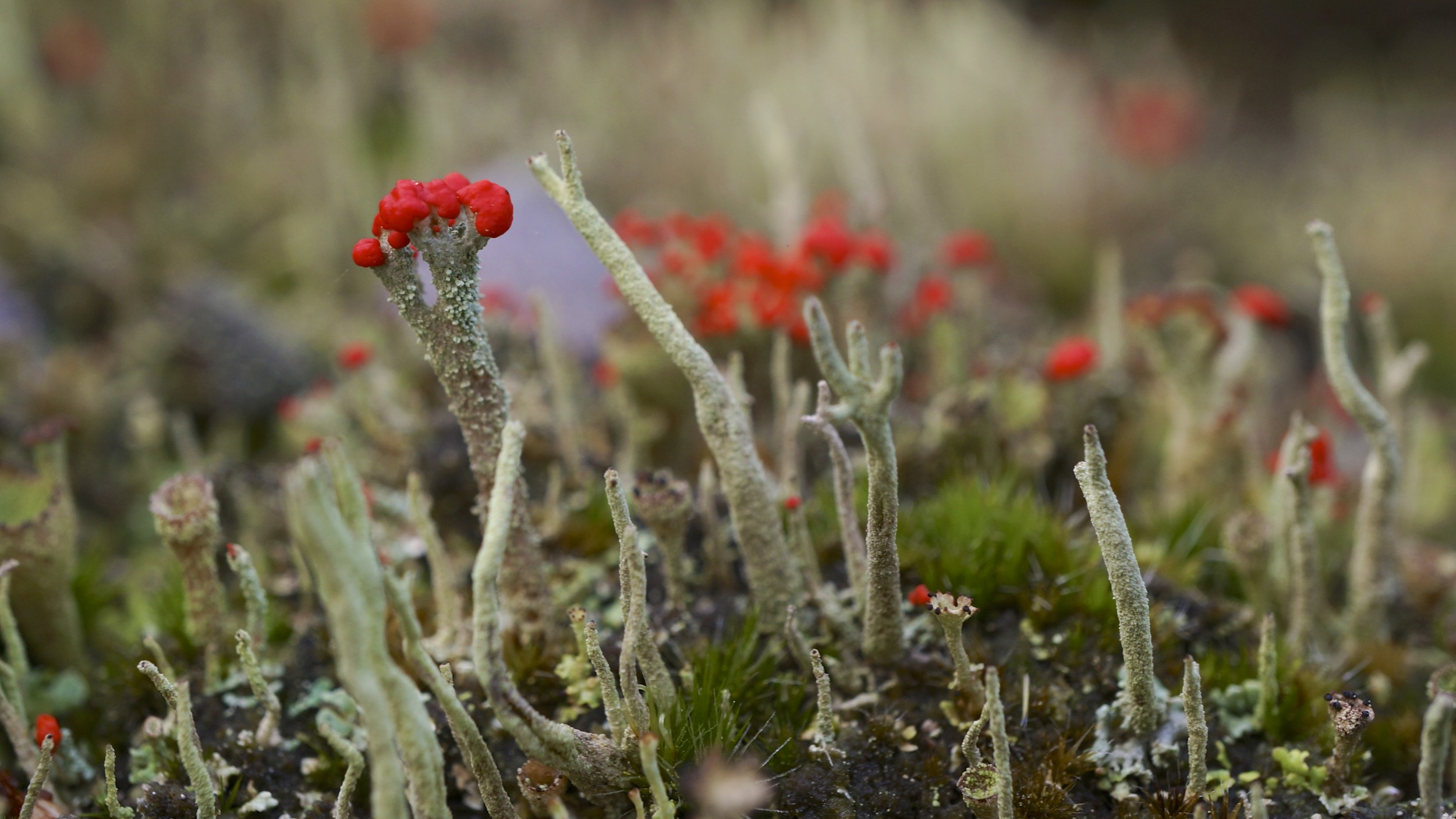
Cladonia floerkeana growing in a heathland nature reserve in Dorset, England

Cladonia floerkeana has a broad but patchy distribution, with records from multiple continents. In Honduras, it is rare and has been observed growing on wooden fences, suggesting it may be frequently overlooked in this region. The species is also found in Chile, where it is considered very rare, and in eastern North America, ranging from Florida (very rare) to Newfoundland. In Europe and Australasia, its presence has been confirmed, though the full extent of its distribution is poorly understood, partly due to confusion with the similar species Cladonia macilenta. Additional records indicate its presence in Melanesia, including Papua New Guinea, as well as in regions of North and South America, Europe, Africa, Asia (e.g., Japan and Taiwan), and Oceania, including New Caledonia, Australia, and New Zealand.

The species grows in nutrient-poor acidic soils and is commonly found in habitats such as heathlands, boreal forests, and areas recovering from disturbance, including post-fire landscapes. It grows on a variety of substrates, including soil, humus, rocks, and sand, and is occasionally found on decaying wood. It has been observed in geothermal vent areas in Japan, where it tolerates extreme conditions, including high surface temperatures (above 40°C), root-zone temperatures exceeding 70°C, and soil pH levels between 5 and 5.5. Despite this adaptability, C. floerkeana is highly sensitive to soil pH changes and exhibits a calcifugeous nature, being absent from alkaline or limestone-dominated soils. Lime treatment in experimental conditions resulted in lethal effects, emphasising its requirement for acidic substrates. The species has been collected at elevations ranging from 1,800 to 3,200 metres.

== Ecology ==
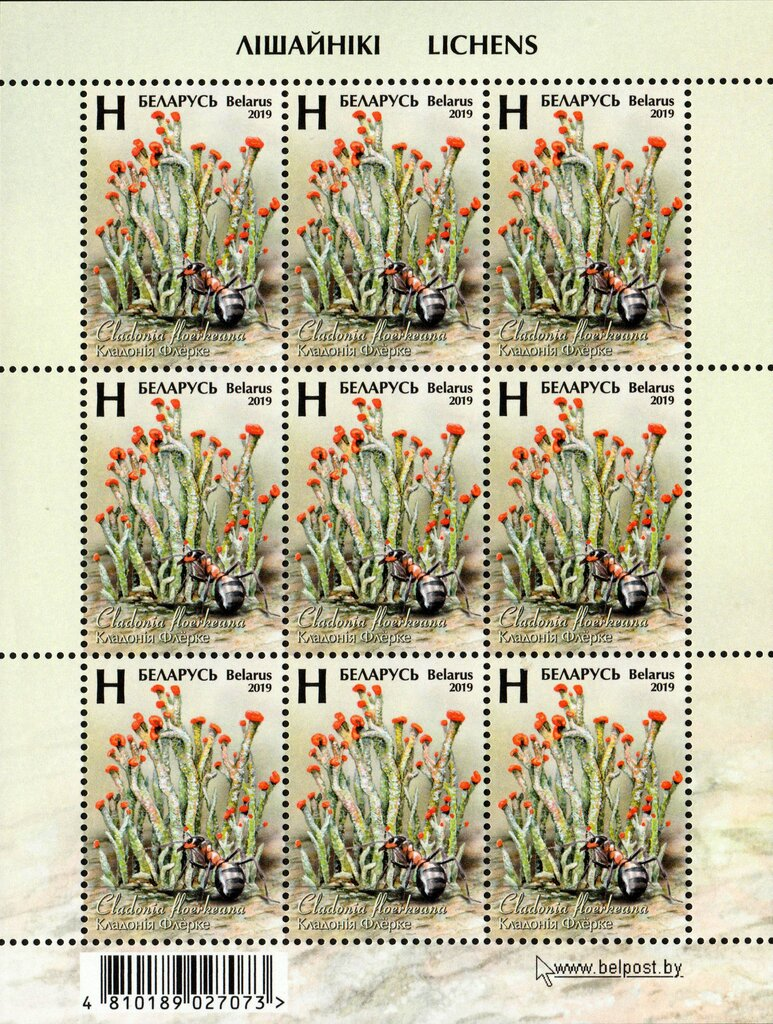
Cladonia floerkeana depicted on a 2019 stamp of Belarus

As a pioneer species, C. floerkeana often establishes early in succession, forming part of a characteristic "cup lichen" community. These adaptations enable it to occupy niches too harsh for vascular plants or mosses, reducing competition in these environments. The podetia show a high degree of variability, ranging from entirely decorticate surfaces to densely squamulose ones, allowing the lichen to adapt to a wide range of environmental conditions and substrate types.

The species demonstrates a preference for environments with low atmospheric nitrogen deposition, where it is more abundant compared to high-deposition areas. High nitrogen deposition can reduce lichen diversity and promote algal growth, which may outcompete C. floerkeana. This sensitivity to nitrogen deposition further limits its distribution in areas subject to elevated nitrogen levels. In high-nitrogen environments, C. floerkeana is often replaced by nitrogen-tolerant species, such as Cladonia macilenta and Cladonia ramulosa.

Ecologically, C. floerkeana demonstrates a high reproductive effort, producing abundant apothecia on its podetia, which die after spore release. This strategy facilitates its rapid colonisation of new substrates. Although tolerant of extreme conditions, the species remains relatively rare in geothermal vent systems, likely due to its specific habitat requirements and interactions with environmental factors such as soil texture and moisture. The structure of its podetia, particularly the fibrous medullary layer that persists after secondary squamules shed, may provide structural support and resilience to environmental stressors, further enhancing its ability to thrive in disturbed or extreme habitats. Its slow growth rate (about 0.8 mm per year) further reflects its classification as a stress-tolerant organism, adapted to persist in nutrient-poor and disturbed environments. The species relies on a heterothallic breeding system, requiring genetically distinct partners for sexual reproduction, which promotes genetic diversity and enhances its adaptability to harsh environments.

== See also ==
- List of Cladonia species
