= Umbilicaria maculata =

Scientific classification
- Domain: Eukaryota
- Kingdom: Fungi
- Division: Ascomycota
- Class: Lecanoromycetes
- Order: Umbilicariales
- Family: Umbilicariaceae
- Genus: Umbilicaria
- Species: U. maculata

Binomial name
- Umbilicaria maculata Krzew., M.P.Martín & M.A.García (2009)

Species of lichen

Umbilicaria maculata is a species of saxicolous (rock-dwelling) umbilicate lichen in the family Umbilicariaceae. It is found in high-elevation alpine locations in Poland and France.

== Taxonomy ==
Umbilicaria maculata was formally described as a new species in 2009 by Beata Krzewicka, María Paz Martín, and Miguel Angel García. The type specimen was collected by the first author from Mały Kozi Wierch, a peak in the Tatra Mountains (Western Carpathians) at an elevation of 2,220 m (7,280 ft).

== Description ==
The thallus of Umbilicaria maculata is monophyllous, meaning that it consists of a single more or less orbicular, flattened, leafy lobe with a single point of attachment to the substrate. It is grey to grey–brown in colour with some whiter regions, and up to 3 cm (1.2 in) in diameter with a smooth, dull upper surface. The thallus undersurface is also smooth and dull, with a pale creamy to white colour that darkens towards the edges. The medulla is white and comprises two layers: a loose upper part with a webby (arachnoidal) plectenchyma, and a more compact plectenchyma in the lower part.

Apothecia (spore-bearing structures) are black and about 1 mm in diameter; they have an apothecial disc with central column of sterile tissue (omphalodisc) and a fissure in the centre. The asci are club-shaped (clavate), contain eight spores, and measure 40–45 by 10–15 μm. Ascospores are hyaline and with dimensions of 10–12 by 5–6 μm.

== Habitat and distribution ==
Umbilicaria maculata grows on the vertical faces of siliceous rocks in alpine and subnival habitats, preferring locations that are shaded and exposed to wind. Originally known from only a few location in the Tatra Mountains, it has since been reported from Uvernet-Fours in southeastern France, where it was found on the vertical faces of large blocks of Annot sandstone, at an elevation of 2,324 m (7,625 ft). The authors call the lichen "extremely rare", but acknowledge that its true distribution is not well understood because of potential confusion with the lookalike Umbilicaria cylindrica.
