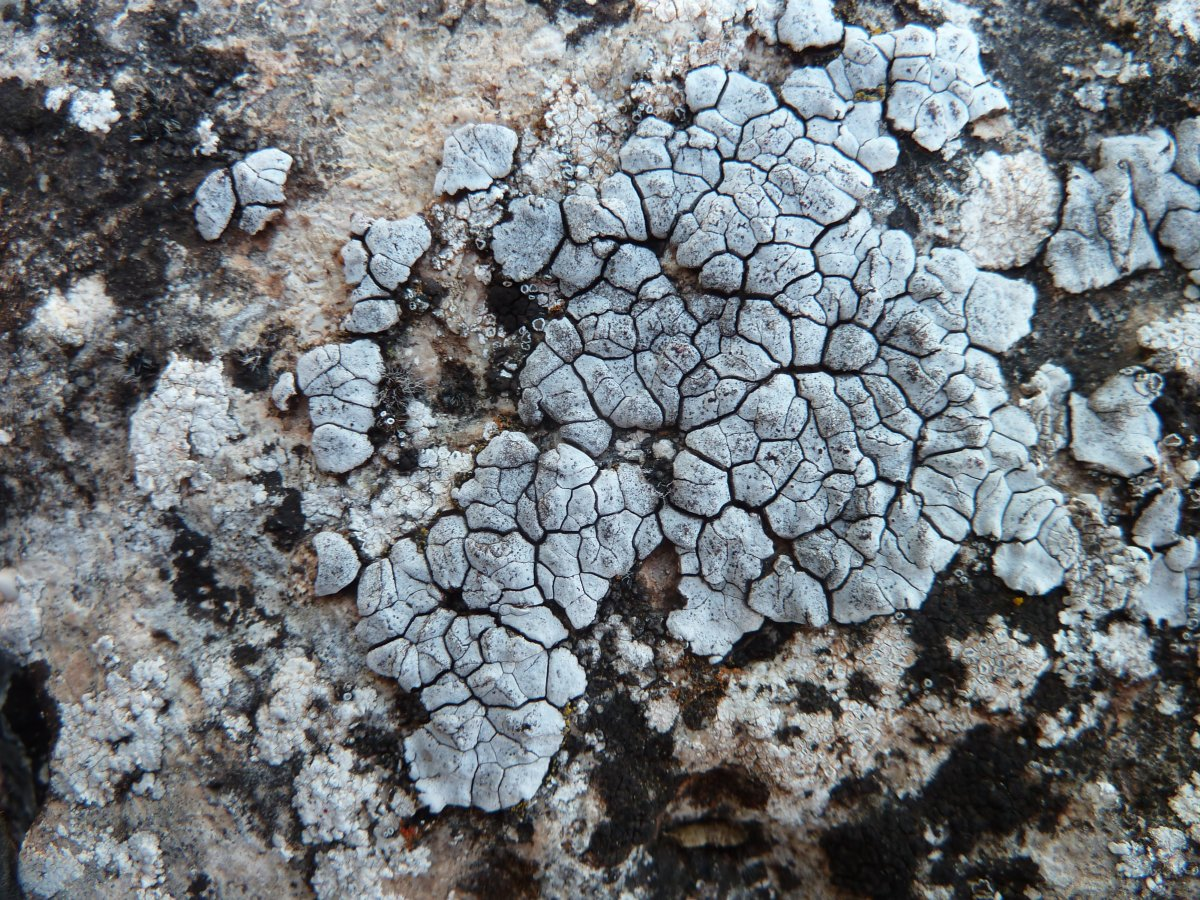

Scientific classification
- Domain: Eukaryota
- Kingdom: Fungi
- Division: Ascomycota
- Class: Eurotiomycetes
- Order: Verrucariales
- Family: Verrucariaceae
- Genus: Placocarpus
- Species: P. schaereri

Binomial name
- Placocarpus schaereri (Fr.) Breuss (1985)

Synonyms
- Parmelia schaereri Fr. (1831); Lecanora schaereri (Fr.) Rabenh. (1845); Endocarpon schaereri (Fr.) Nyl. (1853); Verrucaria schaereri (Fr.) Nyl. (1855); Catapyrenium schaereri (Fr.) R.Sant. (1984)

= Placocarpus schaereri =

Species of lichen

Placocarpus schaereri is a species of saxicolous (rock-dwelling), areolate, and crustose lichen in the family Verrucariaceae. Found in Europe and West Asia, it is the type species of genus Placocarpus. Juvenile forms of Placocarpus schaereri are often parasitic on the lichen Protoparmeliopsis muralis.

== Taxonomy ==
The lichen was first described scientifically in 1831 by Elias Magnus Fries, who called it Parmelia schaereri. The species epithet honours Swiss pastor and lichenologist Ludwig Schaerer. Othmar Breuss transferred it to the newly reinstated genus Placocarpus in 1985.

This species has been known by several synonyms throughout its taxonomic history, including Placocarpus saxorum, Endocarpon saxorum, Endocarpon miniatum var. monstrosum, Placidium monstrosum, Verrucaria monstrosa, Dermatocarpon monstrosum, Verrucaria schaereri, and Catapyrenium schaereri.

The combination of unique characteristics—including its growth form, somewhat umbilicate areolae, thick euplectenchymatous medulla with crystals, and distinctive spores—provided sufficient taxonomic evidence to separate Placocarpus as a genus distinct from Verrucaria, with P. schaereri serving as the type species for this reinstated genus.

== Description ==
While superficially resembling species in the genus Verrucaria, P. schaereri is distinguished by its larger size and several taxonomically significant characteristics in its anatomy and reproductive structures. The thallus (main body of the lichen) is thick, reaching up to 2.5 mm due to an extensively developed medulla (inner layer). The central portions of the thallus display a cracked, areolate pattern, while the outer edges show a more or less distinctly effigurate (outward-spreading) form.

The areolae (small, island-like segments of the thallus) are attached to the substrate by short stalks composed of densely packed, perpendicularly arranged fungal filaments (hyphae) that extend from the medulla. The outer areolae have a significant portion of their undersides free from the substrate, with a blackening paraplectenchymatous (cellular) lower cortex, giving well-developed specimens an almost lobate appearance.

The thick medulla consists of interwoven hyphae densely filled with minute colourless crystals or granules (comparable to the medulla in the Lecanoralean genus Squamarina) and slowly turns blue when treated with iodine. The spores typically measure 20–28 by 8–10 μm and are halonate (surrounded by a gelatinous sheath), with this gelatinous layer being most prominent in premature spores, reaching approximately 2.5 μm in thickness. As this feature appears only during a relatively brief period of spore development, it had been overlooked by earlier researchers.

Beyond its anatomy and spores, P. schaereri is further distinguished from the genus Catapyrenium by its areolate appearance, which develops from the cracking of what was initially a continuous crust. In contrast, the thallus in Catapyrenium consists of squamules (scale-like structures) that develop individually from the prothallus (the initial growth of the fungal component).

== Habitat and distribution ==
Placocarpus schaereri is typically found in dry, open habitats on calcareous substrates, particularly favouring limestone and dolomite rocks. In Austria, the lichen has been recorded from sunny, south-exposed rock surfaces, often in hot and dry (xerothermic) conditions. The species tends to occur in areas characterised by sparse vegetation, frequently co-occurring with other lichens adapted to similar arid conditions. Austrian populations of Placocarpus schaereri are primarily concentrated in the southern Alps. In Slovenia, it has been reported from dry, vertical to inclined rock faces near Črni Kal, where it grows alongside lichens such as Caloplaca inconnexa, Rinodina lecanorina, and Candelariella medians. In Ukraine, it was reported from the Medobory Nature Reserve. Placocarpus schaereri is also known to occur in Turkey, and Iraq.
