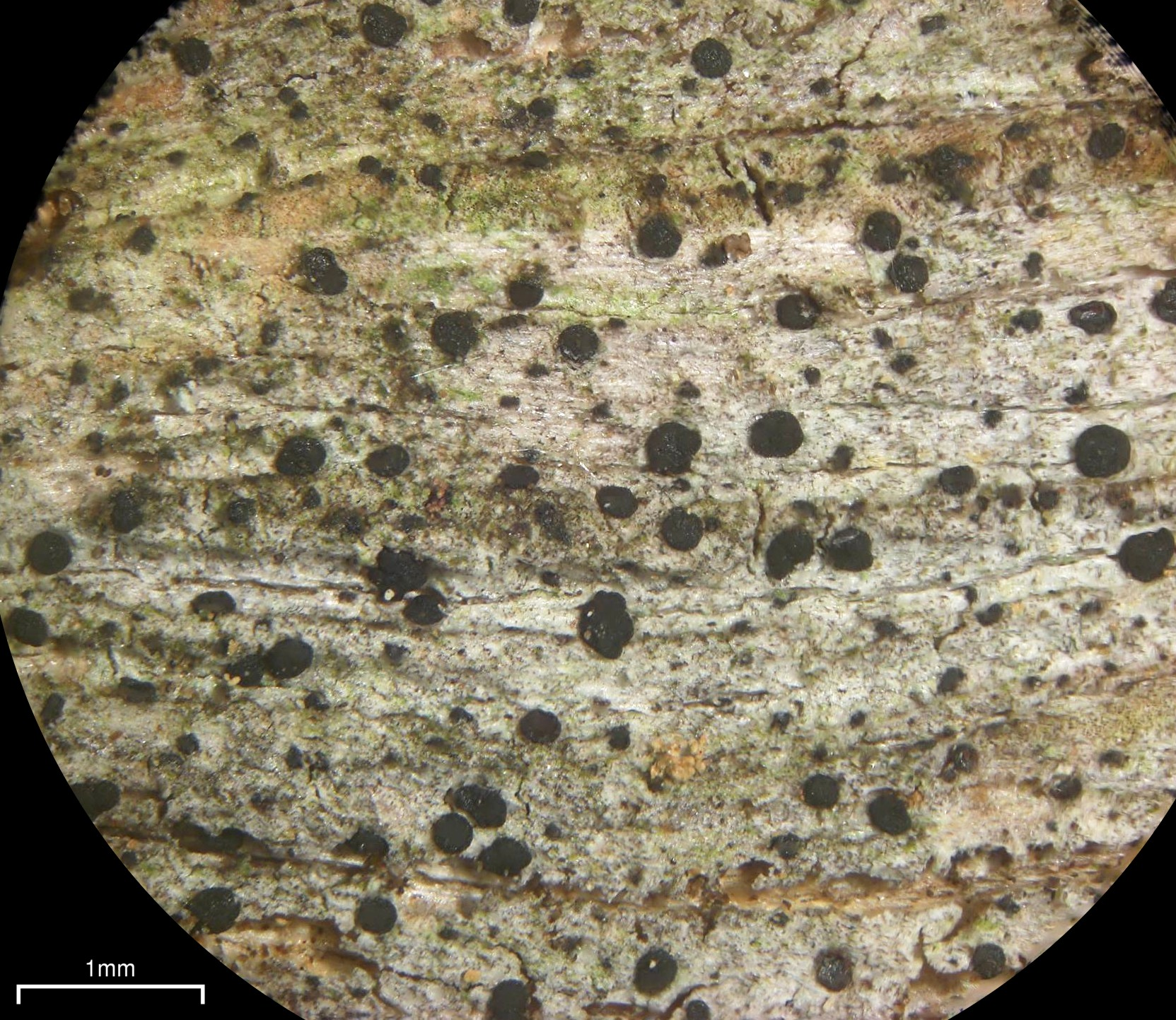
- on old oak trunk; scale bar=1 mm

Scientific classification
- Kingdom: Fungi
- Division: Ascomycota
- Class: Lecanoromycetes
- Order: Caliciales
- Family: Caliciaceae
- Genus: Buellia
- Species: B. schaereri

Binomial name
- Buellia schaereri De Not. (1846)

Synonyms
- Karschia destructans Tobler (1911); Karschia schaereri (De Not.) Sacc. & Traverso (1910)

= Buellia schaereri =

Species of lichen

Buellia schaereri is a species of lichen in the family Caliciaceae. It was formally described as a new species in 1849 by Italian botanist Giuseppe De Notaris. The botanical name honours Swiss pastor and lichenologist Ludwig Schaerer. It is a widely distributed lichen, occurring in Africa, Asia, Northern and Central Europe, Macaronesia, Central America, and North America. It grows on the bark and wood of trees, especially conifers and oak.

== Description ==
Buellia schaereri has a thin, effuse, pale grey thallus. It has dark brown to black apothecia that measure 0.2–0.3 mm in diameter, with a flat to convex disc. The ascospores it makes are smooth and thin-walled with a single septum and typical dimensions of 6–10 by 2.5–4 μm. Pycnidia are visible as tiny (50–70 μm) black specks on the thallus surface; they are often numerous. They produce short oblong to ellipsoid conidia measuring 2–3 by 1–1.4 μm.

== See also ==
- List of Buellia species
