= Stigmidium gyrophorarum =

Scientific classification
- Kingdom: Fungi
- Division: Ascomycota
- Class: Dothideomycetes
- Order: Mycosphaerellales
- Family: Mycosphaerellaceae
- Genus: Stigmidium
- Species: S. gyrophorarum

Binomial name
- Stigmidium gyrophorarum (Arnold) D. Hawksw. (1975)

Synonyms
- Arthopyrenia gyrophorarum Arnold (1896); Didymosphaeria gyrophorarum (Arnold) Sacc. & D. Sacc. (1905); Endococcus gyrophorarum (Arnold) J.C. David & D. Hawksw. (1988); Pharcidia gyrophorarum (Arnold) Zopf (1897); Pharcidia gyrophorum (Arnold) Zopf (nomen illegitimum)

Species of fungi

Stigmidium gyrophorarum is a species of lichenicolous fungus in the family Mycosphaerellaceae. It is known to grow on Umbilicaria cylindrica.
