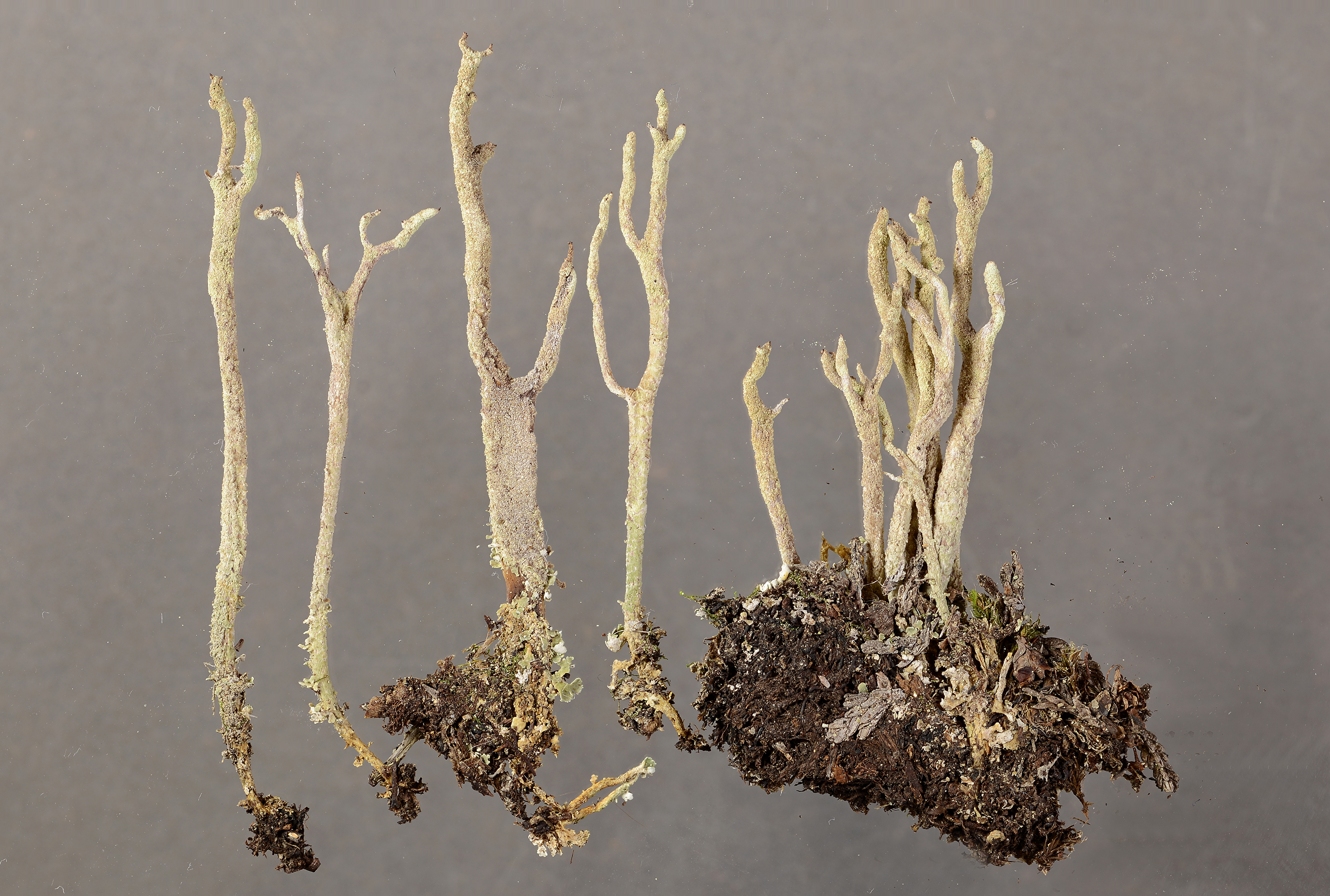

Scientific classification
- Domain: Eukaryota
- Kingdom: Fungi
- Division: Ascomycota
- Class: Lecanoromycetes
- Order: Lecanorales
- Family: Cladoniaceae
- Genus: Cladonia
- Species: C. alpina

Binomial name
- Cladonia alpina (Asahina) Yoshim. (1968)

Synonyms
- Cladonia floerkeana var. alpina Asahina (1939)

= Cladonia alpina =

Species of lichen

Cladonia alpina (Swedish: Gaffelbägarlav) is a species of fruticose lichen that is in the family Cladoniaceae. It has been found in Japan, Norway, and the United Kingdom.

Molecular phylogenetic analysis indicates that Cladonia alpina is a member of the Erythrocarpae: Subglaucescentes clade, a group of species including C. floerkeana, C. macilenta and C. polydactyla. Although the presence of porphyrilic acid has been claimed to be diagnostic for this species, some non-European collections lack this substance.

== Description ==
Cladonia alpina is similar to Cladonia macilenta in appearance, but has taller podetia measuring up to 5 cm (2 in) in height, usually bifurcate or sparingly dichotomously branched in the upper part. Podetia are partially corticate or sorediate throughout, or more or less corticate with soredia only towards and at the tips; the soredia are farinose to somewhat granular. Squamules at the base of the podetia are 1–2 mm long, and are scalloped or incised. Apothecia are red, and quite rare. Pycnidia occur on the tip of the podetia, with red pycnidial jelly. The expected results of standard chemical spot tests on the thallus are C−, K−, KC−, Pd− (or rarely Pd+ yellow), and UV−. Lichens products found in this species include barbatic acid, porphyrilic acid, and thamnolic acid.
