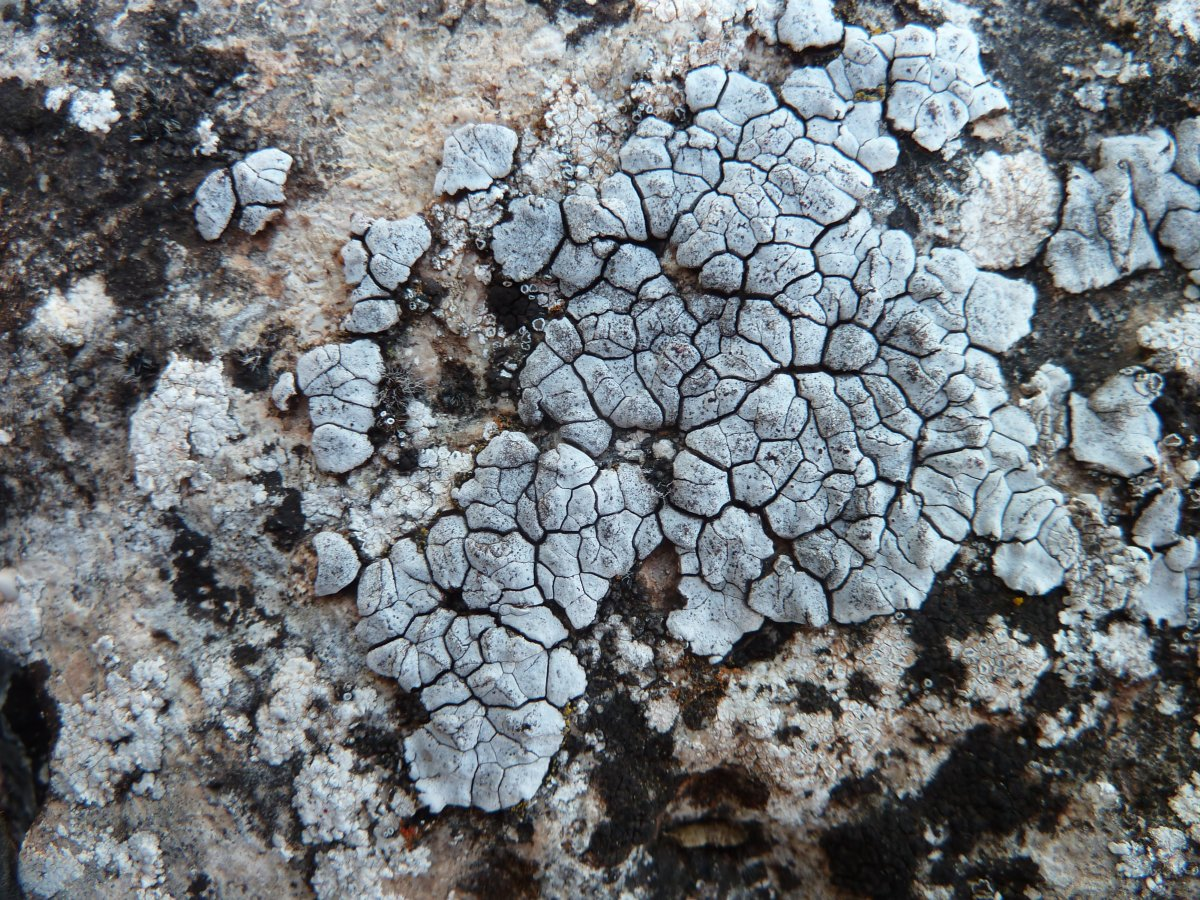
- Placocarpus schaereri

Scientific classification
- Domain: Eukaryota
- Kingdom: Fungi
- Division: Ascomycota
- Class: Eurotiomycetes
- Order: Verrucariales
- Family: Verrucariaceae
- Genus: Placocarpus; Trevis. (1860)

Type species
- Placocarpus schaereri (Fr.) Breuss (1985)

Species
- P. americanus P. schaereri

= Placocarpus =

Genus of fungi

Placocarpus is a genus of lichens in the family Verrucariaceae. The genus was circumscribed by Italian botanist Vittore Benedetto Antonio Trevisan de Saint-Léon in 1860.

== History ==
Some of the members of that genus are newly imported to Russia.
