= Ludwig Schaerer =

Swiss clergyman and lichenologist

Ludwig Emanuel Schaerer
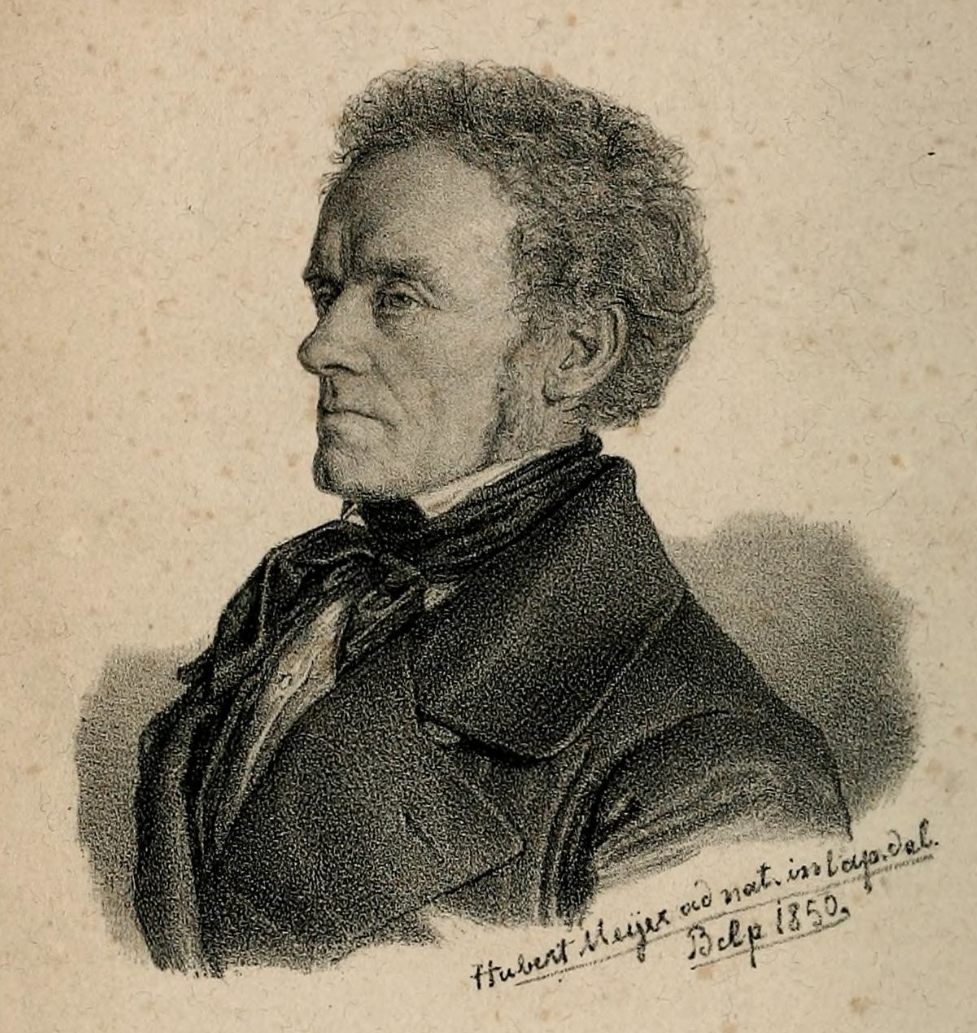
- Lithograph of Ludwig Schaerer in 1850
- Born: 6 November 1785; Bern, Switzerland
- Died: 3 February 1853 (aged 67); Belp, Switzerland
- Scientific career
- Fields: Lichenology
- Author abbrev. (botany): Schaer.

Ludwig Emanuel Schaerer (Note: Various alternative forms and spellings for Schaerer's first and last names have been used in the literature. These include: Schaerer, Ludov. Emanuel; Schaer, Ludwig Emanuel; Schaerer, Ludovicus E.; Scheerer, Ludovicus E.; Schaerer, Ludovicus Emanuel; Schärer, Ludwig Emanuel; Schaer, Ludovicus Emanuel; and Louis-Emmanuel Schaerer.) (11 June 1785 – 3 February 1853) was a Swiss pastor and lichenologist. Interested in natural history from a young age, Schaerer trained as a teacher and studied theology in Bern. During his career as a teacher, orphanage director, and pastor, he researched extensively and maintained correspondence with foreign botanists interested in cryptogams. Schaerer was best known for his multi-volume work Lichenum Helveticorum Spicilegium ("Anthology of Swiss Lichens"), published in 12 parts from 1823 to 1842. This series catalogued and described the lichens of Switzerland, particularly those in the Alps, where he often went on collecting excursions. In another series, he compiled and distributed dried herbarium specimens acquired from his collections. Several lichen taxa have been named in honour of Schaerer.

== Early life and education ==
Ludwig Schaerer was born on June 11, 1785, in Bern. His father, Johann Rudolf, was a professor of biblical studies and Hebrew and also a pastor in Bümpliz; his mother's name was Magdalena Rudolf. From a young age, Schaerer was interested in investigating the native flora of his home town. His early interest in natural history was later enhanced through his association with several botanists that lived in his home town. Despite his interests, he thought he had to obey the wishes of his parents and pursue an ecclesiastical career, and he devoted himself to the study of ancient languages and theology. He trained as a teacher and studied theology in Bern. From 1806 to 1808 he was a teacher at a primary school in Bern. He was ordained as part of the evangelical ministry in 1808. During this time, he had not forgotten about botany, and devoted his leisure time to its study. Because of the vastness of the field, he decided to specialize in the study of lichens, which were abundant in the nearby Alps, and which were relatively little known compared to the plant flora. He was a student of the botanist Nicolas Charles Seringe.

== Career ==
A travel grant enabled him to visit the Universities of Halle and Berlin from 1811 to 1812. There he met several prominent botanists, such as Heinrich Funck, Carl Sprengel, Gustav Flörke, Carl Willdenow, and Heinrich Schrader. In particular, Flörke helped him with his study of lichens. Schaerer also traveled to the Harz and the Ore Mountains. Upon his return to Switzerland in 1814, Schaerer became a high school teacher and vice-principal (conrector) in Bern, but he kept up his botanical research as much as his other duties would allow. During his annual vacations, he would make collecting trips to the Alps, particularly to Bernese Oberland, Valais, Graubünden, and Ticino. These trips began in 1807 and continued almost uninterruptedly until near the end of his life. Both Nicolas Seringe and Albrecht von Haller initially helped him with identifying his collections. Schaerer was one of the founders of the Bern Society of Natural Sciences (Naturforschende Gesellschaft in Bern) in 1815.

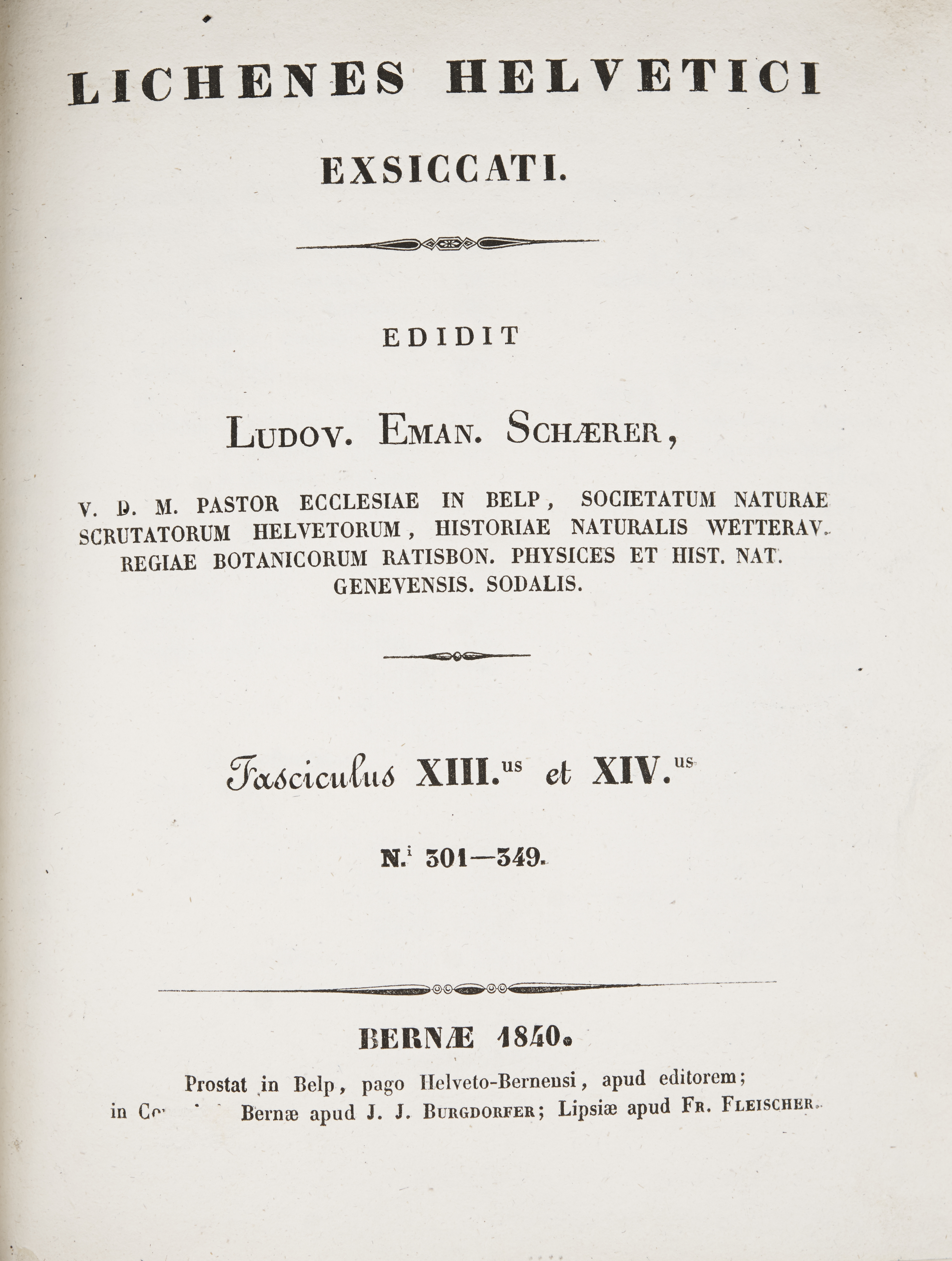
Front cover of 1840 work

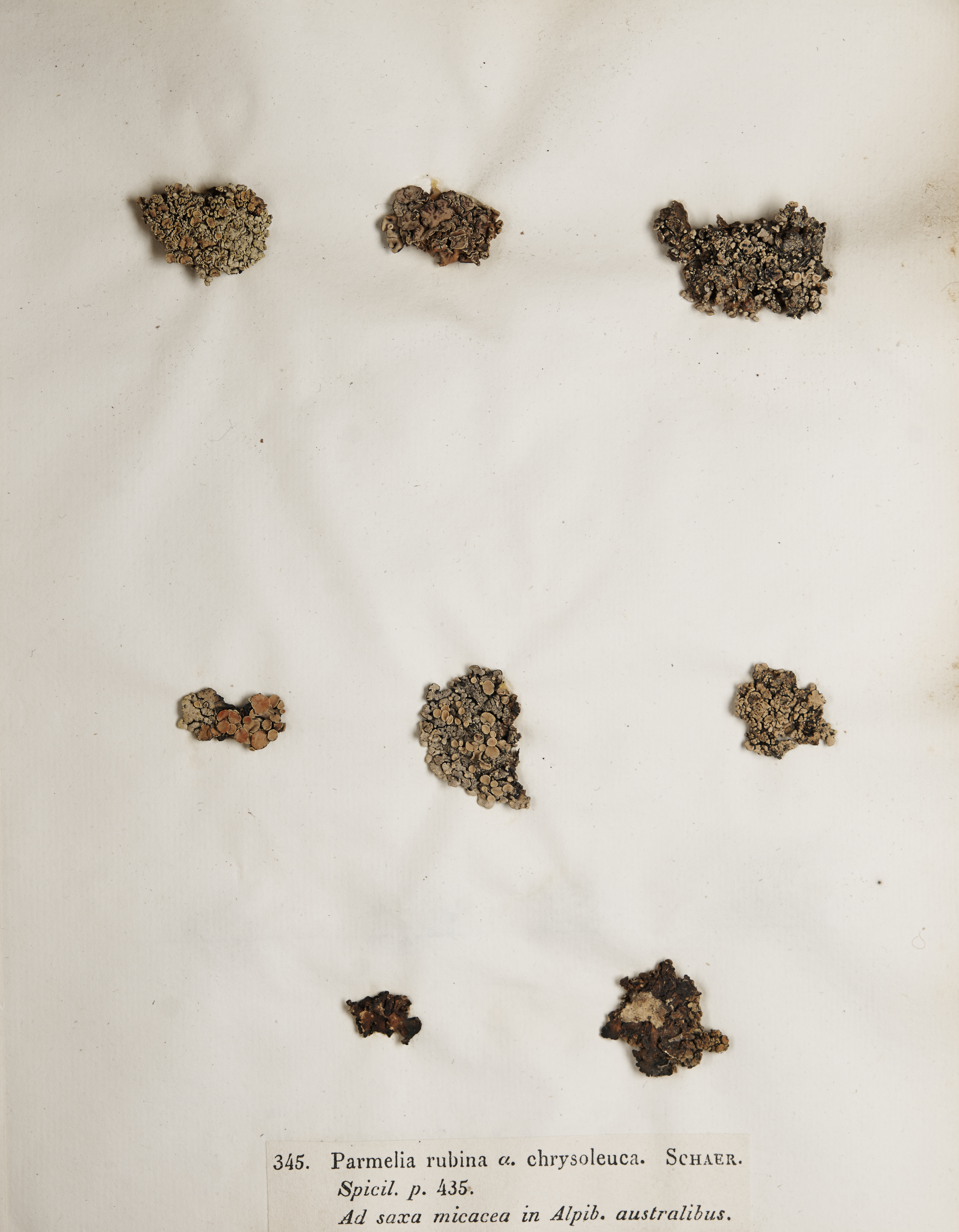
Dried specimens

Schaerer's series Lichenes Helvetici was a succession of sets of herbarium specimens (exsiccata) representing Swiss lichens.

In 1817, Schaerer married Rosina Henzi, the daughter of Rudolf Jakob, a Bernese businessman. Their marriage resulted in a son and four daughters. It was around this time that he began publishing the results of his research. In 1819 he was administrator of the bourgeois orphanage in Bern. From 1826 to 1836, he was a pastor in Lauperswil (Canton of Bern) and from 1836 to 1852, in Belp. Schaerer researched extensively and maintained correspondence with foreign botanists interested in cryptogams, including Erik Acharius, Olof Swartz, Elias Magnus Fries, and Heinrich Gustav Flörke. He undertook the publication of an extensive work, Lichenum Helveticorum Spicilegium, which was published in 12 sections from 1823 to 1842. He simultaneously published Lichenes Helvetici exsiccati, a collection of dried herbarium specimens; this exsiccata series he continued working on until his death. By the time of his death, 650 collections were included in this exsiccata series.

In 1836, Schaerer exchanged the post of orphanage administrator in Lauperswil for that of Belp, which brought him closer to Bern and his friends. He continued his frequent excursions in the surroundings and the neighbouring Alps, and was often visited and accompanied by foreign scholars. His contacts sometimes afforded him access to specimens from exotic or otherwise inaccessible locales. For example, in 1841, the already famous paleontologist and glaciologist Louis Agassiz led a group that climbed to the peak of the mountain Jungfrau in the Swiss Bernese Alps – an elevation of 4,158 m (13,642 ft). There they collected some high-altitude lichens found growing on exposed rocks; these specimens were later sent to Schaerer for further study. He determined that several of the species were already known from other alpine locations, but a new species he named Umbilicaria virginis to refer to the type locality (Jungfrau means "maiden" or "virgin" in German).

The summer of 1847 was devoted to a trip to the Pyrenees, with the aim of comparing the vegetation of these mountains with that of the Alps. Enriched with his new observations, Schaerer began the publication of his Enumeratio Critica Lichenum Europaeorum ("Enumeration of the European lichens"), an illustrated work that depicted the type species of each genus. Because of the simple and natural classification proposed, and the precise and clear descriptions of the taxa, the work was well received by his contemporaries. As was noted more than a century later, this classification system was the last based mainly on external anatomy, without any consideration of spore structure. Schaerer had made known his thoughts regarding the use of microscopic characters as taxonomic characters in previous criticism of works by Kurt Sprengel and Ernst Meyer. He censured the abandonment of the old system of classification established by Erik Acharius, and doubted the usefulness of using the microscope to determine generic placement among the lichens. His skepticism towards microscopy is understandable considering that the defects of chromatic and spherical aberration were prevalent at the time – flaws that would not be resolved until better lenses were available in the 1830s. Schaerer's own observations on lichen structure were consequently of limited utility. For example, in a short paper published in 1820, although he correctly reported that the lichen thallus could comprise several superimposed layers, he misinterpreted the nature of the green cells in the lichen (the photobiont algal cells), calling them "globules" that he erroneously believed could function independently as propagules.

== Later life and death ==
After completing his Enumeratio, Schaerer began another book of lichen exsiccati, but soon his health started to deteriorate. He complained of a weakening of memory, which made his work laborious. However, he followed with interest the new research of Charles and Edmond Tulasne and Carl Nägeli, on the anatomy and reproduction of lichens, and even undertook to observe the results by microscopic observations. His rapidly worsening bowel disease forced him to suspend his work. Schaerer died in his sleep, surrounded by his family, in Belp on February 3, 1853, at the age of 67 years and 8 months.

In his obituary of Schaerer, his colleague Ludwig Fischer wrote of his character: "The uprightness of his character, the kindness of his heart and the great modesty with which he spoke of his own knowledge, leave a memory of regret and affection in all who lived in his privacy". (Note: French: "La droiture de son caractère, la bonté de son coeur et la grande modestie avec laquelle il parlait de ses propres connaissances, laissent un souvenir de regret et d'affection chez tous ceux qui vivaient dans son intimité.") Heinrich Guthnick wrote: "Schärer was a man of sublime character, adorned with a loving soul, therefore full of goodwill towards his fellow men, deeply loved by his family and all who had recognized these precious qualities in him." (Note: German: "Schärer war ein Mann von erhabenem Charakter, mit liebreicher Seele geziert, daher voll Wohlwollen gegen seine Mitmenschen, innig bedauert von den Seinigen und Allen, welche diese köstlichen Eigenschaften in ihm erkannt hatten.") In a description of Schaerer's lichen exsiccata at the herbarium at the Montpellier Botanical Garden, Hervé Harant wrote "Segments of sentences in Latin, reminds us that he was one of those many clergymen who were passionate about lichenology". As of 1979, Schaerer's herbarium collections were mostly held at the Geneva Botanical Garden, with some held at the University of Glasgow.

== Recognition ==
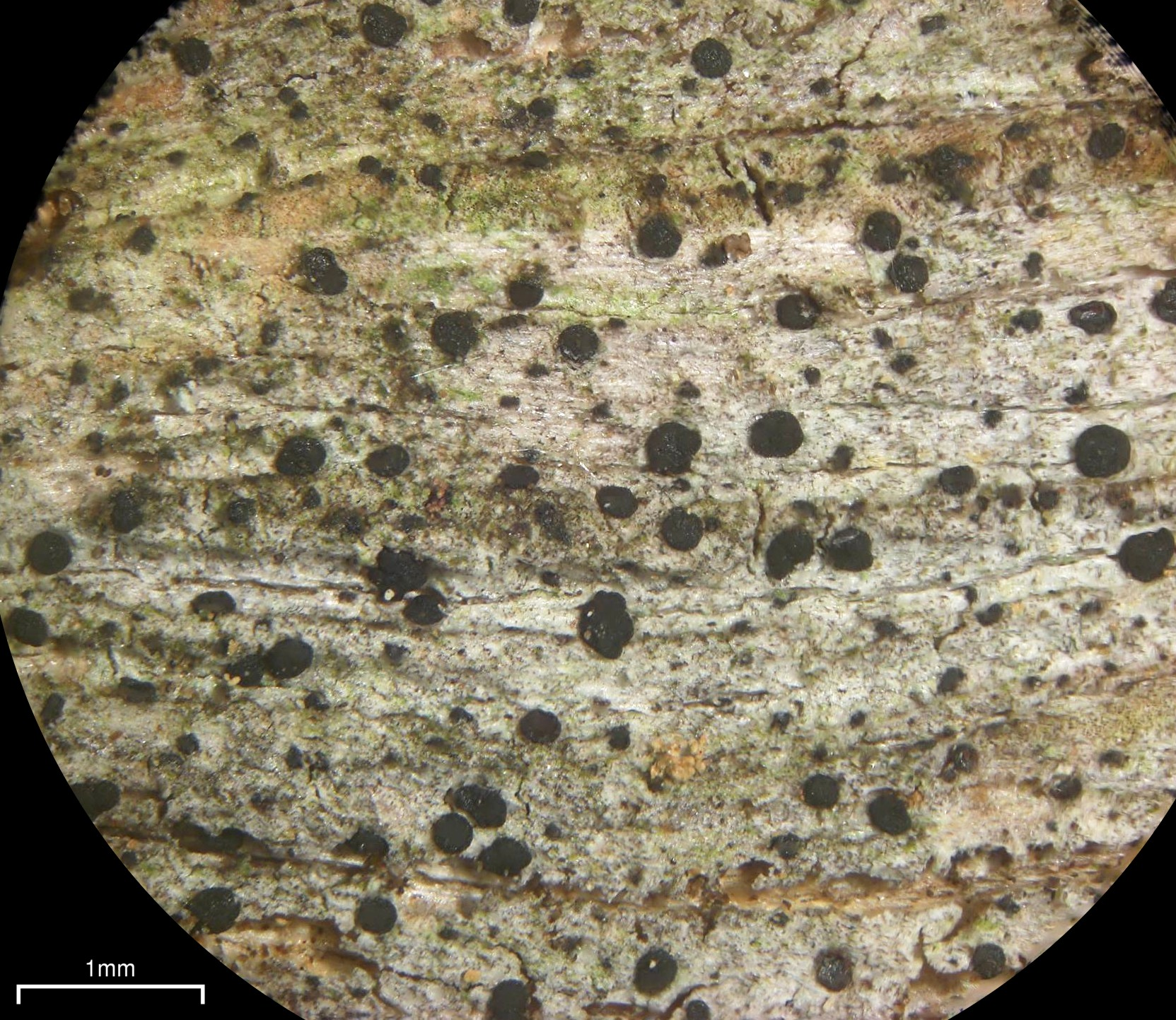
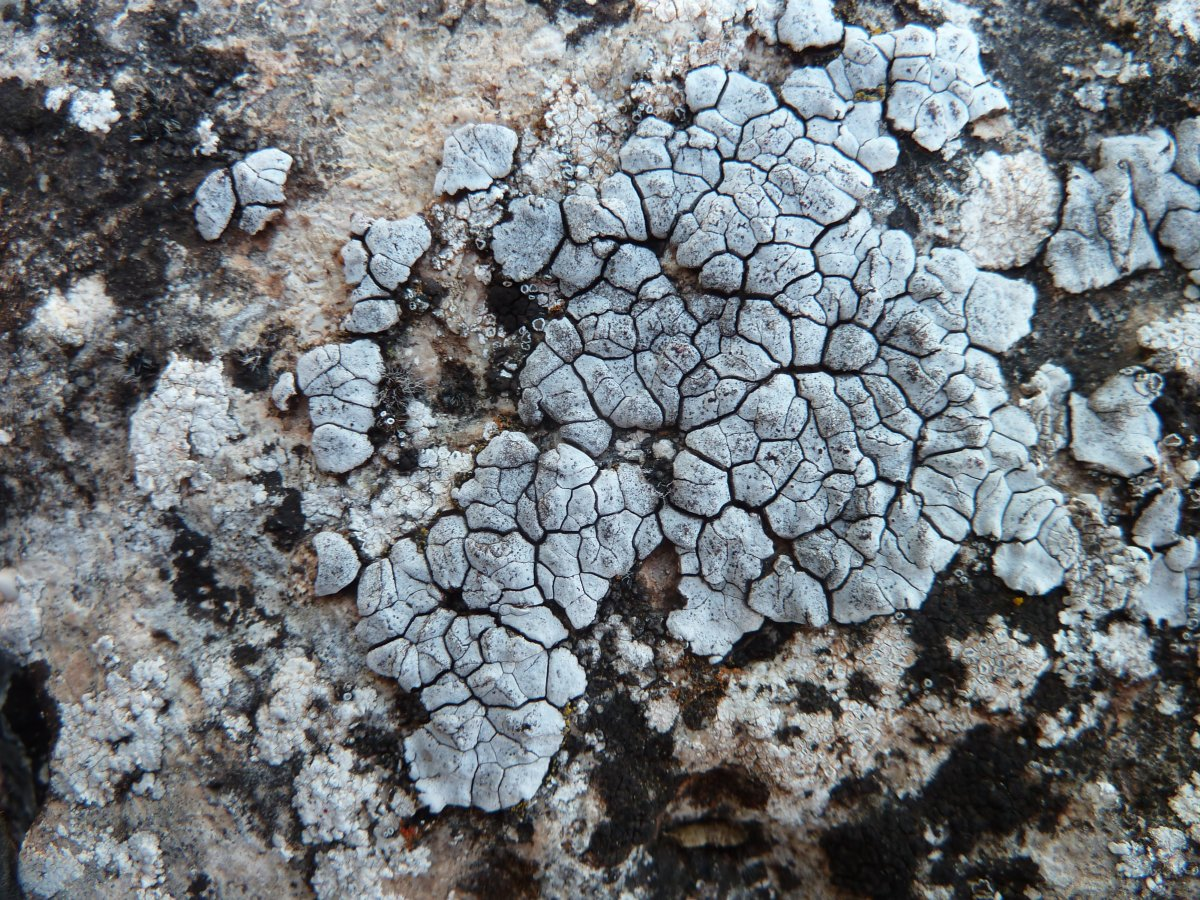
Buellia schaereri (left) and Placocarpus schaereri (right) are two of several lichen species named after Ludwig Schaerer.

A lithograph image (created by Hubert Meyer) and brief biography of Schaerer appeared in the journal Taxon's Portraits of Botanists series in 1973. In his analysis of the history of Swiss lichenology, Philippe Clerc considers Schaerer's output to mark the end of the "classic period" (dating before 1800 to 1840) where the Swiss lichen flora was still in its early days of documentation, and use of the microscope was not yet prevalent.

In a 2007 publication, Geir Hestmark analysed Schaerer's contribution to the knowledge of the genus Umbilicaria. He noted that in general, Schaerer published "many valuable observations on the morphology and reproductive structures of these lichens", but that "with regard to the delimitation of Umbilicaria species, their variation and nomenclature, he appears to have been very confused".

=== Eponymy ===
The genus Schaereria Körb. (1855) honours Schaerer. He has also had several lichen species named after him, including: Arthonia schaereri A.Massal. (1855); Buellia schaereri De Not. (1846) Calicium schaereri De Not. (1846); Cyphelium schaereri De Not. (1846); Lecanora schaereri Ach. (1839); Lecidea schaereri Flörke (1881); Nephroma schaereri De Not. (1851); Ochrolechia schaereri Hafellner; Pannaria schaereri A.Massal. (1852); Parmelia schaereri Fr. (1831); Pertusaria schaereri Hafellner (2001); Physcia schaereri Hepp (1854); Pyrenula schaereri A.Massal. (1854); Sphaeria schaereri A.Massal. (1853); Sporoblastia schaereri Trevis. (1856); Sporodictyon schaererianum A.Massal. (1852); Sticta schaereri Mont. & Bosch (1856); Thelotrema schaereri Hepp (1853); and Verrucaria schaereriana Servít (1948).

== Selected works ==
- Schaerer, Ludwig E. (1823). Lichenum Helveticorum Spicilegium. Vol. 1. Sumtibus Auctoris Excudebat Officina Halleriana. pp. i–iv, 1–52.
- ————————— (1826). Lichenum Helveticorum Spicilegium. Vol. 1. Sumtibus Auctoris Excudebat Officina Halleriana. pp. 53–100.
- ————————— (1828). Lichenum Helveticorum Spicilegium. Vol. 1. Sumtibus Auctoris Excudebat Officina Halleriana. pp. 101–156.
- ————————— (1833). Lichenum Helveticorum Spicilegium. Vol. 1. Sumtibus Auctoris Excudebat Officina Halleriana. pp. 157–206.
- ————————— (1833). Lichenum Helveticorum Spicilegium. Vol. 1. Sumtibus Auctoris Excudebat Officina Halleriana. pp. 207–262.
- ————————— (1833). Lichenum Helveticorum Spicilegium. Vol. 1. Sumtibus Auctoris Excudebat Officina Halleriana. pp. 263–320.
- ————————— (1836). Lichenum Helveticorum Spicilegium. Vol. 1. Sumtibus Auctoris Excudebat Officina Halleriana. pp. 321–380.
- ————————— (1839). Lichenum Helveticorum Spicilegium. Vol. 2. Sumtibus Auctoris Excudebat Officina Halleriana. pp. 381–412.
- ————————— (1840). Lichenum Helveticorum Spicilegium. Vol. 2. Sumtibus Auctoris Excudebat Officina Halleriana. pp. 413–452.
- ————————— (1840). Lichenum Helveticorum Spicilegium. Vol. 2. Sumtibus Auctoris Excudebat Officina Halleriana. pp. 453–510.
- ————————— (1842). Lichenum Helveticorum Spicilegium. Vol. 2. Sumtibus Auctoris Excudebat Officina Halleriana. pp. 511–551.
- ————————— (1842). Lichenum Helveticorum Spicilegium. Vol. 2. Sumtibus Auctoris Excudebat Officina Halleriana. pp. 552–632.
- Lichenes Helvetici exsiccati, fasc. 1–26, nos. 1–650. Bern 1823–1852. (Exsiccata)
- ————————— (1850). Enumeratio critica lichenum europaeorum (in Latin). Bern.

== See also ==
- Category:Taxa named by Ludwig Schaerer
- Commons:Category:Neuchâtel Herbarium Schaerer Project – contains images of many specimens in the Lichenes Helvetici series
