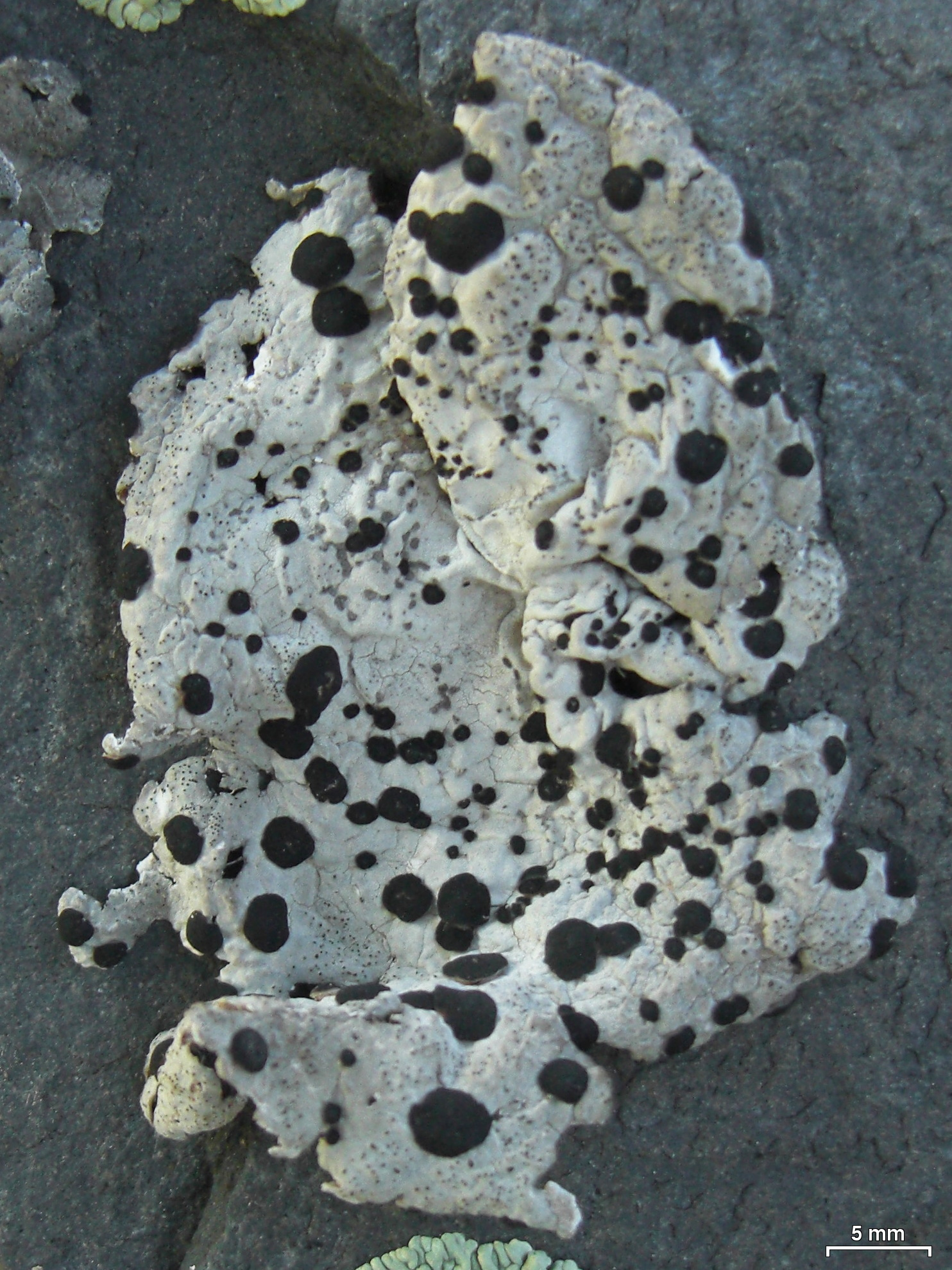

Conservation status
- Secure (NatureServe)

Scientific classification
- Kingdom: Fungi
- Division: Ascomycota
- Class: Lecanoromycetes
- Order: Umbilicariales
- Family: Umbilicariaceae
- Genus: Umbilicaria
- Species: U. virginis

Binomial name
- Umbilicaria virginis Schaer. (1842)

Synonyms
- Agyrophora stipitata (Nyl.) Nyl. (1896); Agyrophora virginis (Schaer.) M.Choisy (1950); Gyrophora rugifera var. stipitata (Nyl.) K.G.W.Lång (1927); Gyrophora stipitata (Nyl.) Branth (1887); Gyrophora virginis (Schaer.) Frey (1929); Gyrophora virginis var. stipitata (Nyl.) Räsänen (1939); Omphalodiscus virginis (Schaer.) Schol. (1936); Umbilicaria stipitata Nyl. (1861); Umbilicaria virginis Schrad. (1841)

= Umbilicaria virginis =

Species of lichen

Umbilicaria virginis, commonly known as the blushing rock tripe, is a species of saxicolous (rock-dwelling) umbilicate lichen in the family Umbilicariaceae. It occurs in polar and alpine regions.

== Taxonomy ==
In 1841 the famous paleontologist and glaciologist Louis Agassiz led a group that climbed to the peak of the mountain Jungfrau in the Swiss Bernese Alps – an elevation of 4,158 m (13,642 ft). There they collected some high-altitude lichens found growing on exposed rocks; these specimens were later sent to Swiss pastor and lichenologist Ludwig Schaerer for further study. He determined that several of the species were already known from other alpine locations, but a new species he named Umbilicaria virginis to refer to the type locality (Jungfrau means "maiden" or "virgin" in German).

In North America, a vernacular name used for the species is "blushing rock tripe".

== Description ==
Umbilicaria virginis has a dark grey to brownish grey thallus that is dusted with pruina or a crystal-like substance, particularly around the umbo. It is typically 1.4–4 cm (0.55–1.57 in) in diameter, although sizes up to 10 cm (4 in) have been recorded. The smooth to slightly roughened lower thallus surface has a pale buff to pinkish tone, and the rhizines are long, slender, and abundant. Its apothecia are plentiful; they are flat with distinct black margins and a smooth disc, and have a diameter of 0.6–4 mm. Umbilicaria kraschennikovii is similar in appearance, but that species lacks rhizines.

== Ecology ==
In a study of how long it took before the onset of colonization rock occurred after deglaciation, researchers estimated it took 80 years for any lichens to become established on bare rock surfaces on Ellesmere Island. In this environment, Xanthoria elegans was the first species to appear, followed by Lecanora crenulata and Umbilicaria virginis about 20 years later.
