= Heinrich Gustav Flörke =

German botanist and lichenologist

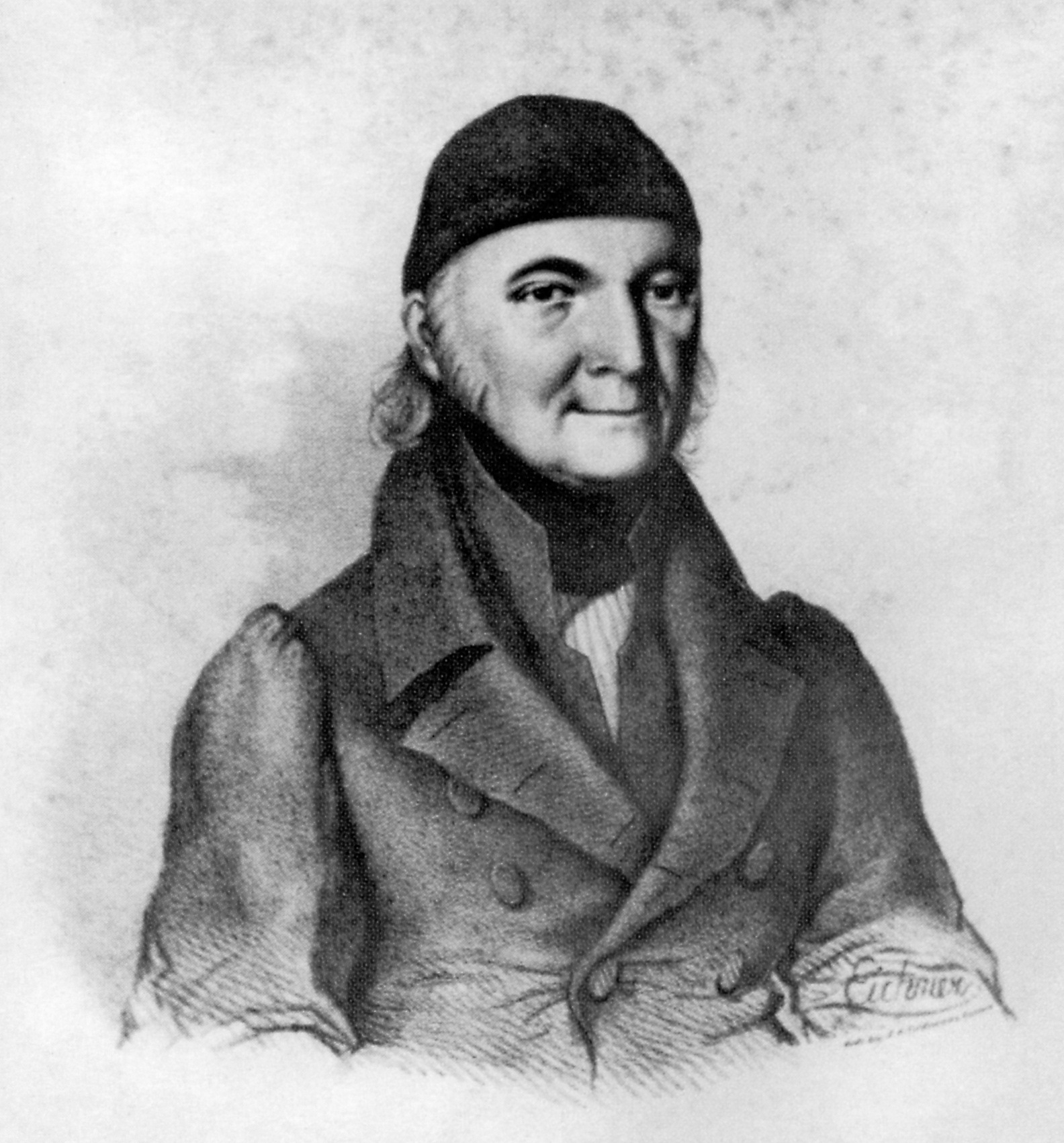
Heinrich Gustav Flörke

Heinrich Gustav Flörke (24 December 1764, in Altkalen in Mecklenburg – 11 June 1835) was a German botanist and lichenologist known for his detailed studies of lichens, particularly within the genus Cladonia. A professor of natural history at the University of Rostock, Flörke contributed to early systematic and floristic research, publishing extensive annotated collections of dried herbarium specimens known as exsiccatae. He continued editing Johann Georg Krünitz's influential Oekonomische Encyklopädie after Krünitz's death, although his tenure was marred by controversy due to disputes with publisher Louise Pauli and accusations of damaging valuable reference materials. Despite these controversies, Flörke's collections and scholarly exchanges, particularly with Erik Acharius, had a lasting impact on lichenological research in Germany.

== Early life and education ==
Flörke was born in Altkalen in Mecklenburg (a historical region in northern Germany), in 1764. He first studied theology and mathematics in Bützow, later studying medicine at the University of Jena. In 1816 he succeeded Ludolph Christian Treviranus (1779–1864) as professor of natural history at the University of Rostock, where he remained for the rest of his life.

== Career and contributions ==
He specialized in the field of lichenology, being known for his investigations of the genus Cladonia. During his career, he was highly critical of Swedish botanist Erik Acharius's work; e.g. Kritische Anmerkungen zu den Becherflechten in der Lichenographia universalis des Herrn Doctors und Ritters Erik Acharius (1810) – (Critical comments on the cup lichen in Lichenographia universalis of Erik Acharius).

For a number of years Flörke was an editor of "Oekonomische Encyklopädie", an encyclopedia initiated by Johann Georg Krünitz (1728–1796). His name is associated with the wildflower genus Floerkea, and also the lichen species Cladonia floerkeana.

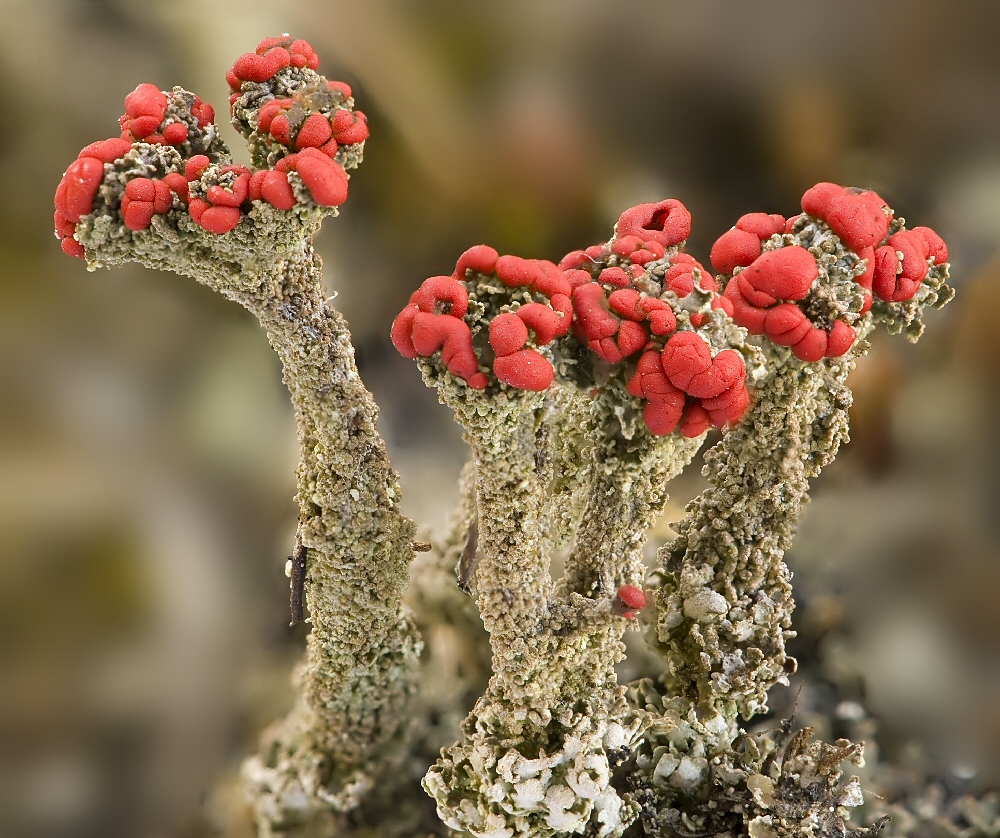
Cladonia floerkeana is named in honour of Flörke.

Flörke's original herbarium collections, though partially dispersed, still hold historical significance and are preserved in major herbaria, particularly in Berlin (B), Munich (M), and Rostock (ROST), where important type specimens can be found. His scholarly correspondence, including exchanges with Acharius despite their critical interactions, exemplifies the collaborative and often contentious scientific discourse of the period. Moreover, Flörke's detailed floristic studies provided foundational insights influencing subsequent ecological and lichenological research within Germany, highlighting his lasting scientific impact.

Flörke played an editorial role in continuing Johann Georg Krünitz's influential Oekonomische Encyklopädie after Krünitz's death in 1796, initially editing alongside his brother Friedrich Jacob. His tenure ended abruptly in 1813 following disagreements with Louise Pauli, widow of the original publisher Joachim Pauli. Flörke subsequently collaborated with Johann Georg Traßler on a cheaper pirated edition published in Brünn, though this effort ceased when Prussian authorities banned its sale in 1815. His editorial methods also attracted criticism; Louise Pauli accused Flörke of extensively damaging the encyclopaedia's reference library by cutting pages out of valuable books for printing purposes, effectively destroying the collection.

== Exsiccata series ==
Flörke issued two significant exsiccatae series (sets of dried and labelled herbarium specimens): the first, titled Deutsche Lichenen, gesammelt und mit Anmerkungen herausgegeben von H. G. F., was published in multiple instalments from 1815 to 1821. The initial three instalments were released in 1815 in Berlin, while subsequent instalments (fourth to sixth) were issued in 1819, and the seventh and eighth in 1821, both in Rostock. The final two instalments, the ninth and tenth, lack a specified location and year. Flörke included extensive annotations and remarks on the specimens, particularly those from Mecklenburg-Vorpommern. This exsiccatae series comprises numerous species records, with Flörke providing the first documented occurrences of 82 lichen species for Mecklenburg-Vorpommern. Additionally, his work contains the first German record for the species Ramalina canariensis and new regional records including Acrocordia cavata, Graphis betulina, Lichenodiplis pertusariicola, Muellerella hospitans, and Ramalina lacera.

His second exsiccatae, titled Cladoniarum exemplaria exsiccata, commentationem novam illustrantia, was released in 1829 and includes 60 numbered specimens. Although this series is held at the Herbarium of the Botanische Staatssammlung München, Flörke did not specify collection localities within the published documentation. Both of these exsiccatae collections significantly contributed to the early systematic and floristic understanding of lichens in Germany, particularly Mecklenburg-Vorpommern.

== Selected writings ==
- Beschreibung der deutschen staubflechten, 1807
- Deutsche Lichenen gesammelt und mit Ammerkungen, 1815
- Floerke, H.G. (1810). "Kritische Anmerkungen zu den Becherflechten in der Lichenographia universalis des Herrn Doctors und Ritters Erik Acharius" [Critical remarks on the cup lichens in the Lichenographia universalis of Doctor and Knight Erik Acharius]. Der Gesellschaft Naturforschender Freunde zu Berlin Magazin für die neuesten Entdeckungen in der gesammten Naturkunde (in German). 4: 248–266.

== See also ==
- Category:Taxa named by Heinrich Gustav Flörke
