= List of Cladonia species =

Cladonia is a large genus of lichens in the family Cladoniaceae. As of October 2025, Species Fungorum (in the Catalogue of Life) lists 494 species in the genus.

== A ==
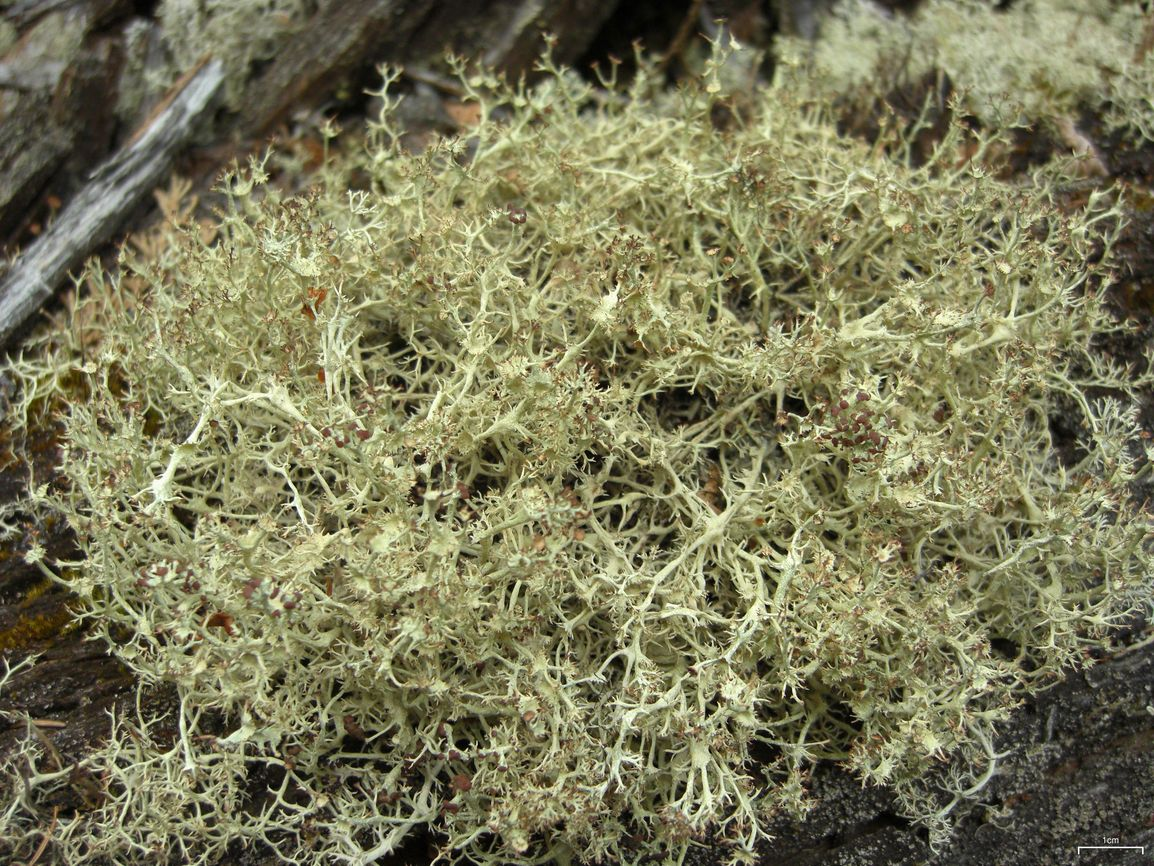
Cladonia amaurocraea

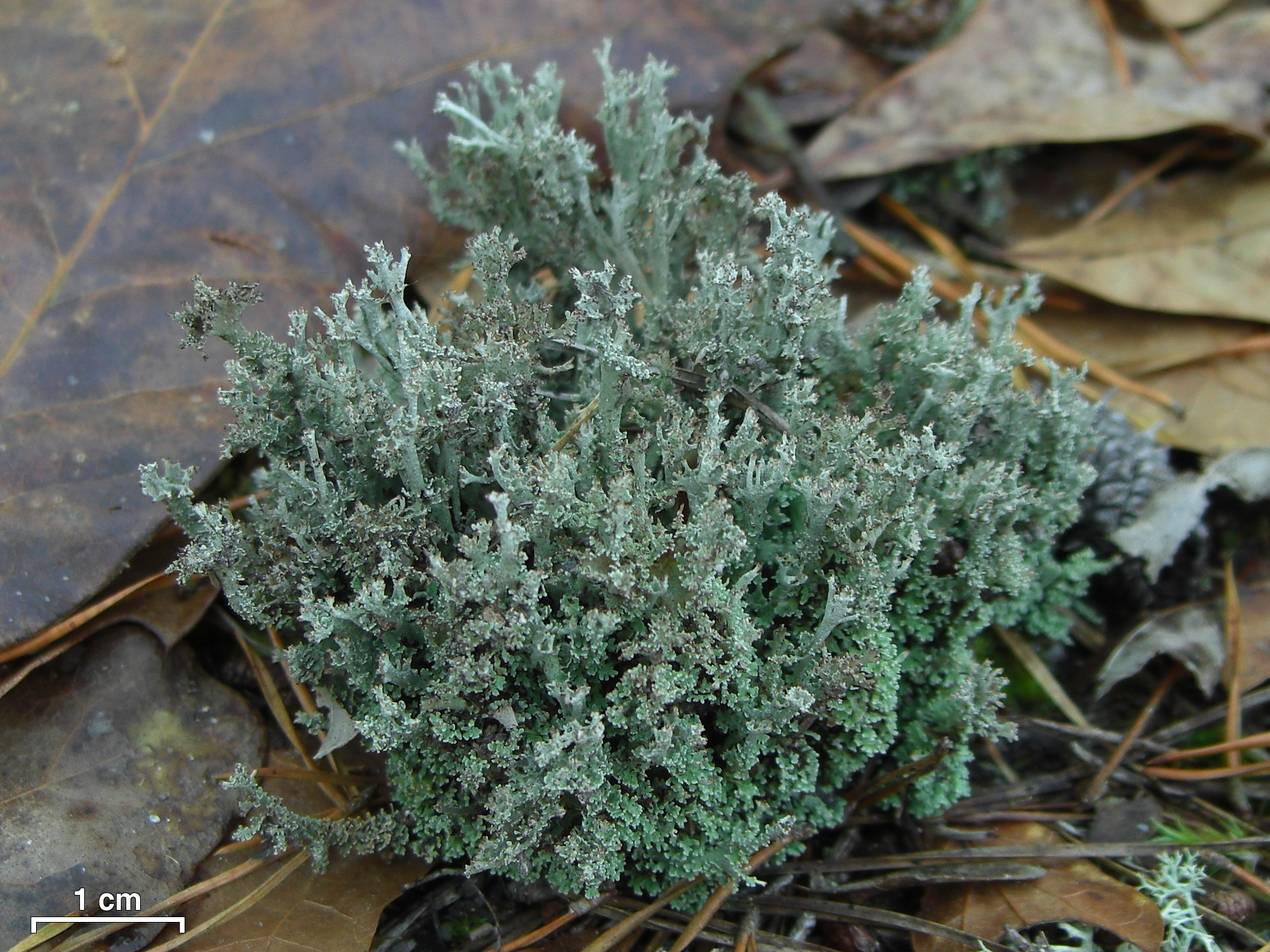
Cladonia atlantica

- Cladonia abbatiana S.Stenroos (1991)
- Cladonia abbreviatula G.Merr. (1924)
- Cladonia abietiformis Harm. (1911)
- Cladonia acervata S.Hammer (2001) – Australia
- Cladonia acuminans R.C.Harris (2009)
- Cladonia acuminata (Ach.) Norrl. (1875)
- Cladonia adspersa Mont. & Bosch (1855)
- Cladonia ahtii S.Stenroos (1989)
- Cladonia alaskana A.Evans (1947)
- Cladonia albata S.Stenroos (1993)
- Cladonia albidula Britzelm. (1907)
- Cladonia albofuscescens Vain. (1887)
- Cladonia albonigra Brodo & Ahti (1996)
- Cladonia aleuropoda Vain. (1899)
- Cladonia aliena Zahlbr. (1915)
- Cladonia alpina Yoshim. (1968)
- Cladonia amaurocraea (Flörke) Schaer. (1887)
- Cladonia anaemica (Nyl.) Ahti (2000)
- Cladonia andereggii S.Hammer (1995)
- Cladonia andesita Vain. (1899)
- Cladonia angustata Nyl. (1859)
- Cladonia anitae W.L.Culb. & C.F.Culb. (1982)
- Cladonia anserina Ahti (1992)
- Cladonia apodocarpa Robbins (1925)
- Cladonia appalachensis Yoshim. & Sharp ex Lendemer & R.C.Harris (2013)
- Cladonia applanata Räsänen (1950)
- Cladonia arbuscula (Wallr.) Flot. (1839)
- Cladonia archeri S.Stenroos (1993)
- Cladonia argentea (Ahti) Ahti & DePriest (2001)
- Cladonia artuata S.Hammer (1993)
- Cladonia asahinae J.W.Thomson (1977)
- Cladonia asperula Ahti & S.Stenroos (2016)
- Cladonia athelia Nyl. (1858)
- Cladonia atlantica A.Evans (1944)
- Cladonia atrans (Ahti) Ahti & DePriest (2001)
- Cladonia attacta S.Hammer (2001) – Australia
- Cladonia attendenda Vain. (1921)
- Cladonia aueri Räsänen (1932)
- Cladonia awasthiana Ahti & Upreti (2004)
- Cladonia azorica Ahti (1961)

== B ==
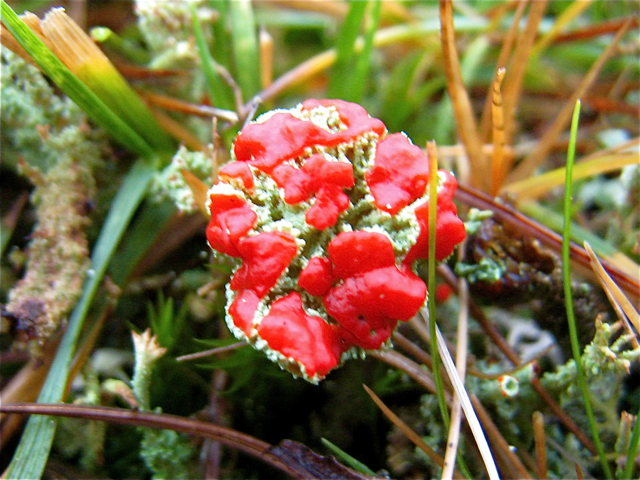
Cladonia bellidiflora

- Cladonia bacillaris (Ach.) Genth (1835)
- Cladonia bacilliformis (Nyl.) Sarnth. (1896)
- Cladonia bahiana Ahti (1995)
- Cladonia bellidiflora (Ach.) Schaer. (1823)
- Cladonia berghsonii Asperges (1981)
- Cladonia bimberiensis A.W.Archer (1985)
- Cladonia blakei Robbins (1931)
- Cladonia boivinii Vain. (1887)
- Cladonia borbonica Nyl. (1868)
- Cladonia borealis S.Stenroos (1989)
- Cladonia botryocarpa G.Merr. ex Sandst. (1925)
- Cladonia botrytes (K.G.Hagen) Willd. (1787)
- Cladonia bouillennei P.A.Duvign. (1939)
- Cladonia brevis (Sandst.) Sandst. (1922)
- Cladonia buckii R.C.Harris (1990)
- Cladonia bungartzii Yánez-Ayabaca & Ahti (2013)

== C ==
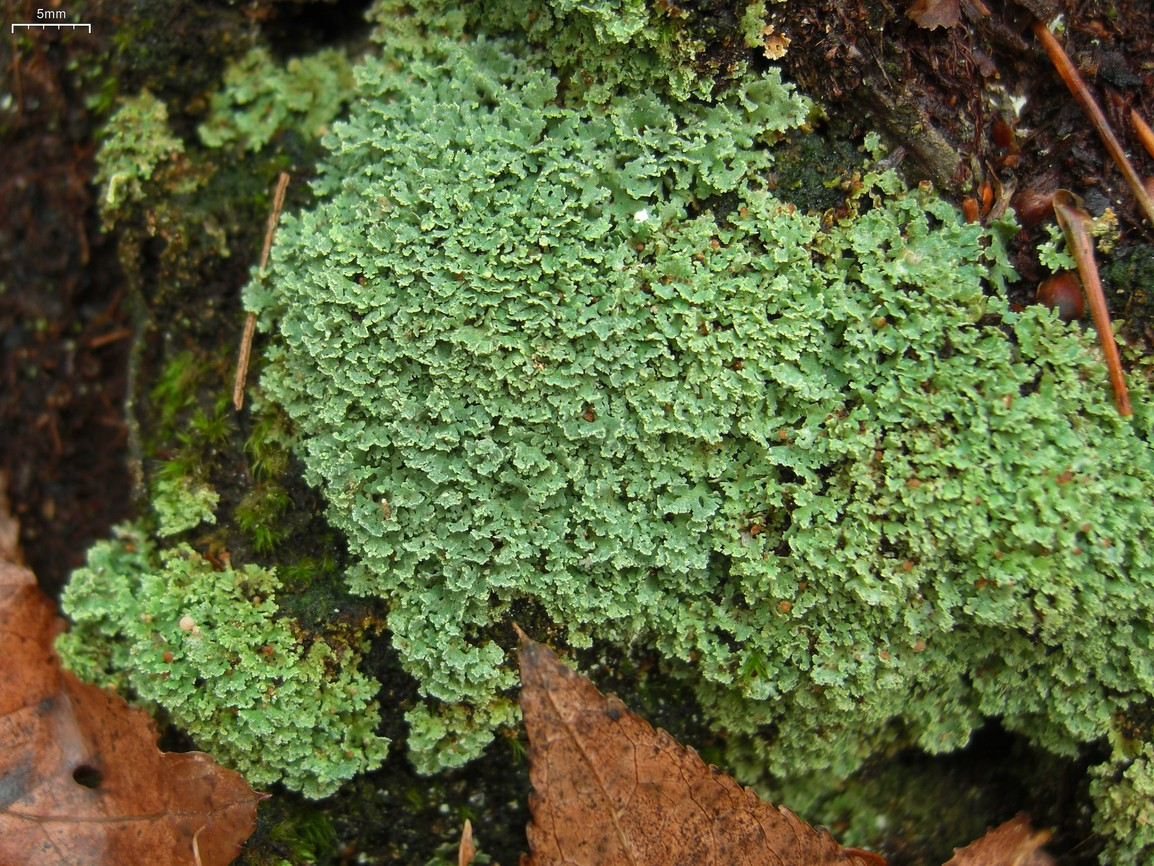
Cladonia caespiticia

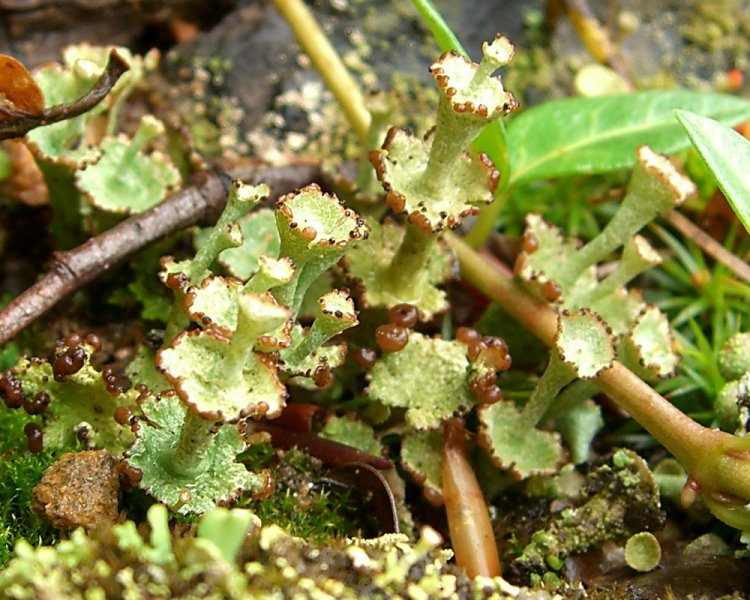
Cladonia cervicornis

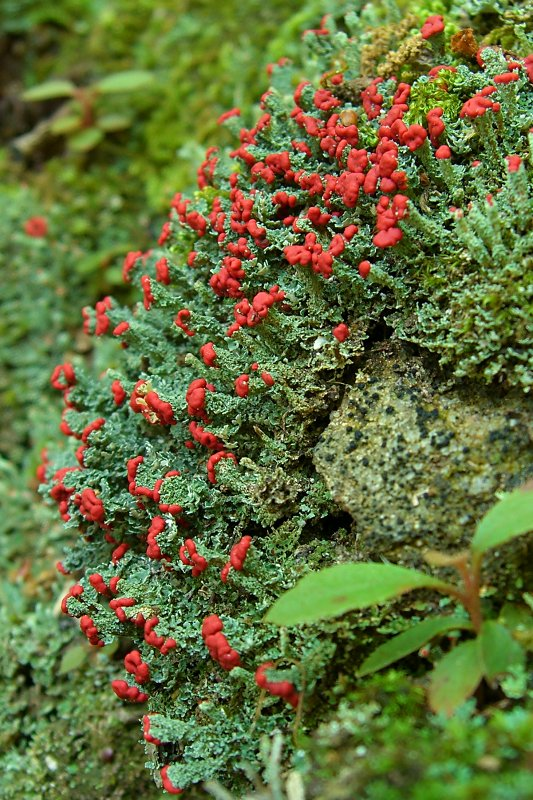
Cladonia cristatella

- Cladonia caespiticia (Pers.) P.Gaertn., B.Mey & Scherb. (1802)
- Cladonia callosa Delise ex Harm. (1907)
- Cladonia calyciformis Nuno (1972)
- Cladonia camerunensis Ahti & Flakus (2016)
- Cladonia caperatica Nuno (1975)
- Cladonia capitellata (Hook.f. & Taylor) C.Bab. (1855)
- Cladonia cariosa (Lilj.) Spreng. (1827)
- Cladonia carnea Hampe (1841)
- Cladonia carneobadia Hampe (1837)
- Cladonia carneola (Fr.) Fr. (1831)
- Cladonia cartilaginea Müll.Arg. (1880)
- Cladonia cayennensis Ahti & Sipman (2013)
- Cladonia celata A.W.Archer (1984) – Australia
- Cladonia cenotea (Ach.) Schaer. (1823)
- Cladonia centrophora Müll.Arg. (1887)
- Cladonia ceranoides Hoffm. (1796)
- Cladonia ceratophylla (Sw.) Spreng. (1827)
- Cladonia cervicornis (Ach.) Flot. (1849)
- Cladonia cetrarioides Schwein. ex Tuck. (1858)
- Cladonia chilensis Räsänen (1944)
- Cladonia chimantae Ahti (2000)
- Cladonia chlorophaea (Flörke ex Sommerf.) Spreng. (1827)
- Cladonia chondroidea Abbayes (1948)
- Cladonia chondrotypa Vain. (1887)
- Cladonia ciliata Stirt. (1888)
- Cladonia cineracea Ahti (2007)
- Cladonia cinerascens Arnold (1884)
- Cladonia cinerella Ahti (2000)
- Cladonia cinereorubens Abbayes (1947)
- Cladonia clathrata Ahti & L.Xavier (1993)
- Cladonia coccifera (L.) Willd. (1787)
- Cladonia coccinea Hoffm. (1796)
- Cladonia complanata S.Hammer (2001) – Australia
- Cladonia compressa Ahti & Flakus (2016)
- Cladonia concinna Ahti & Goward (2007)
- Cladonia confertula Stirt. (1888)
- Cladonia confragosa S.Stenroos (1996)
- Cladonia confusa R.Sant. (1942)
- Cladonia congregata H.Magn. (1942)
- Cladonia coniocraea (Flörke) Spreng. (1827)
- Cladonia coniodendroides F.Wilson (1893)
- Cladonia consimilis Vain. (1887)
- Cladonia corniculata Ahti & Kashiw. (1984)
- Cladonia cornuta (L.) Baumg. (1790)
- Cladonia corsicana (Rondon & Vězda) Pino-Bodas, Burgaz & M.P.Martín (2012)
- Cladonia corymbescens (Nyl.) Nyl. (1866)
- Cladonia corymbites Nyl. (1877)
- Cladonia corymbosula Nyl. (1876)
- Cladonia crinita Bertol. (1856)
- Cladonia crispata (Ach.) Flot. (1839)
- Cladonia cristata Hoffm. (1796)
- Cladonia cristatella Tuck. (1858)
- Cladonia crustacea Ahti (2000)
- Cladonia cryptochlorophaea Asahina (1940)
- Cladonia cubana B.de Lesd. (1936)
- Cladonia cucullata S.Hammer (2001) – Australia
- Cladonia cupulifera Vain. (1887)
- Cladonia curta Ahti & Marcelli (2000)
- Cladonia curtata Britzelm. (1906)
- Cladonia cyanescens Ahti (2000)
- Cladonia cyanopora S.Hammer (2003)
- Cladonia cyathomorpha Stirt. ex Walt. Watson (1935)

== D ==
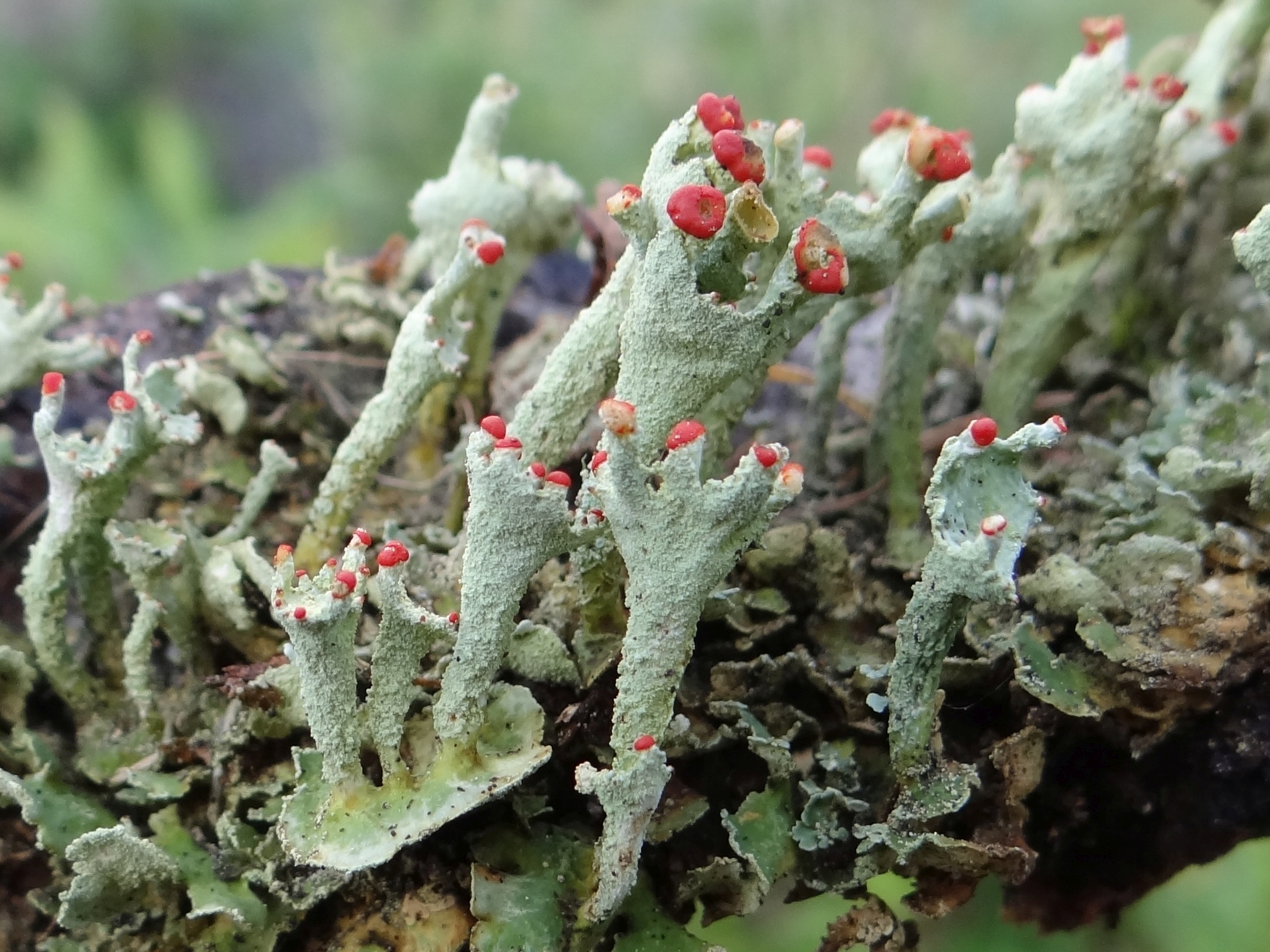
Cladonia didyma

- Cladonia dactylota Tuck. (1859)
- Cladonia darwinii S.Hammer (2003)
- Cladonia daytoniana G.Merr. (1929)
- Cladonia decorticata (Flörke) Spreng. (1827)
- Cladonia decurva Taylor ex C.Bab. & Mitt. (1859)
- Cladonia deformis (L.) Hoffm. (1796)
- Cladonia dehiscens Vain. (1898)
- Cladonia delessertii Vain. (1887)
- Cladonia dendroides (Abbayes) Ahti (1961)
- Cladonia densissima (Ahti) Ahti & DePriest (2001)
- Cladonia deschatresii Boissière (2022)
- Cladonia didyma (Fée) Vain. (1887)
- Cladonia diffissa F.Wilson (1889)
- Cladonia digitata (L.) Baumg. (1790)
- Cladonia dilleniana Flörke (1828)
- Cladonia dimorpha S.Hammer (1990)
- Cladonia dimorphoclada Robbins (1929)
- Cladonia diplotypa Nyl. (1862)
- Cladonia discifera Nyl. (1891)
- Cladonia dissecta Ahti (1995)
- Cladonia divaricata Nyl. (1860)
- Cladonia diversa Asperges ex S.Stenroos (2012)
- Cladonia dubia Abbayes (1952)
- Cladonia dunensis Gumboski, Beilke & Eliasaro (2013)

== E ==
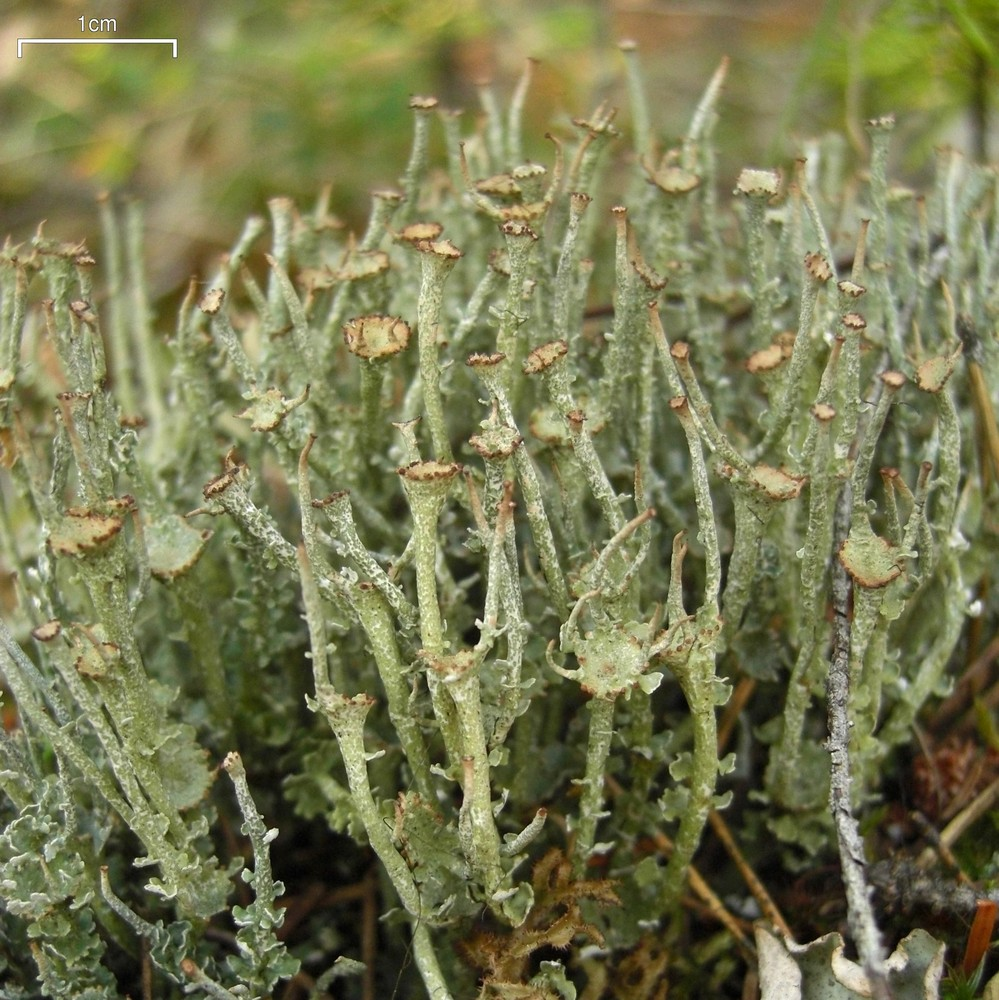
Cladonia ecmocyna

- Cladonia ecmocyna Leight. (1866)
- Cladonia elixii Ahti & V.Wirth (2001)
- Cladonia enantia Nyl. (1888)
- Cladonia evansii Abbayes (1939)

== F ==
- Cladonia farinophylla Ahti (2000)
- Cladonia fimbriata (L.) Fr. (1831)
- Cladonia firma (Nyl.) Nyl. (1861)
- Cladonia fissidens Ahti & Marcelli (1995)
- Cladonia flabelliformis (Flörke) Vain. (1887)
- Cladonia flagellaris Ahti & Marcelli (1995)
- Cladonia flammea Øvstedal (2012) – Falkland Islands
- Cladonia flavocrispata Ahti & Sipman (2013)
- Cladonia fleigiae Ahti & S.Stenroos (2002)
- Cladonia floerkeana (Fr.) Flörke (1828)
- Cladonia floridana Vain. (1927)
- Cladonia foliacea (Huds.) Willd. (1787)
- Cladonia fragosa Ahti & Sohrabi (2016)
- Cladonia friabilis (Huds.) Baumg. (1790)
- Cladonia fruticulosa Kremp. (1881)
- Cladonia furcata (Huds.) Baumg. (1790)
- Cladonia furfuracea Vain. (1894)
- Cladonia furfuraceoides Ahti & Sipman (2002)
- Cladonia fuscofunda S.Hammer (2003)

== G ==
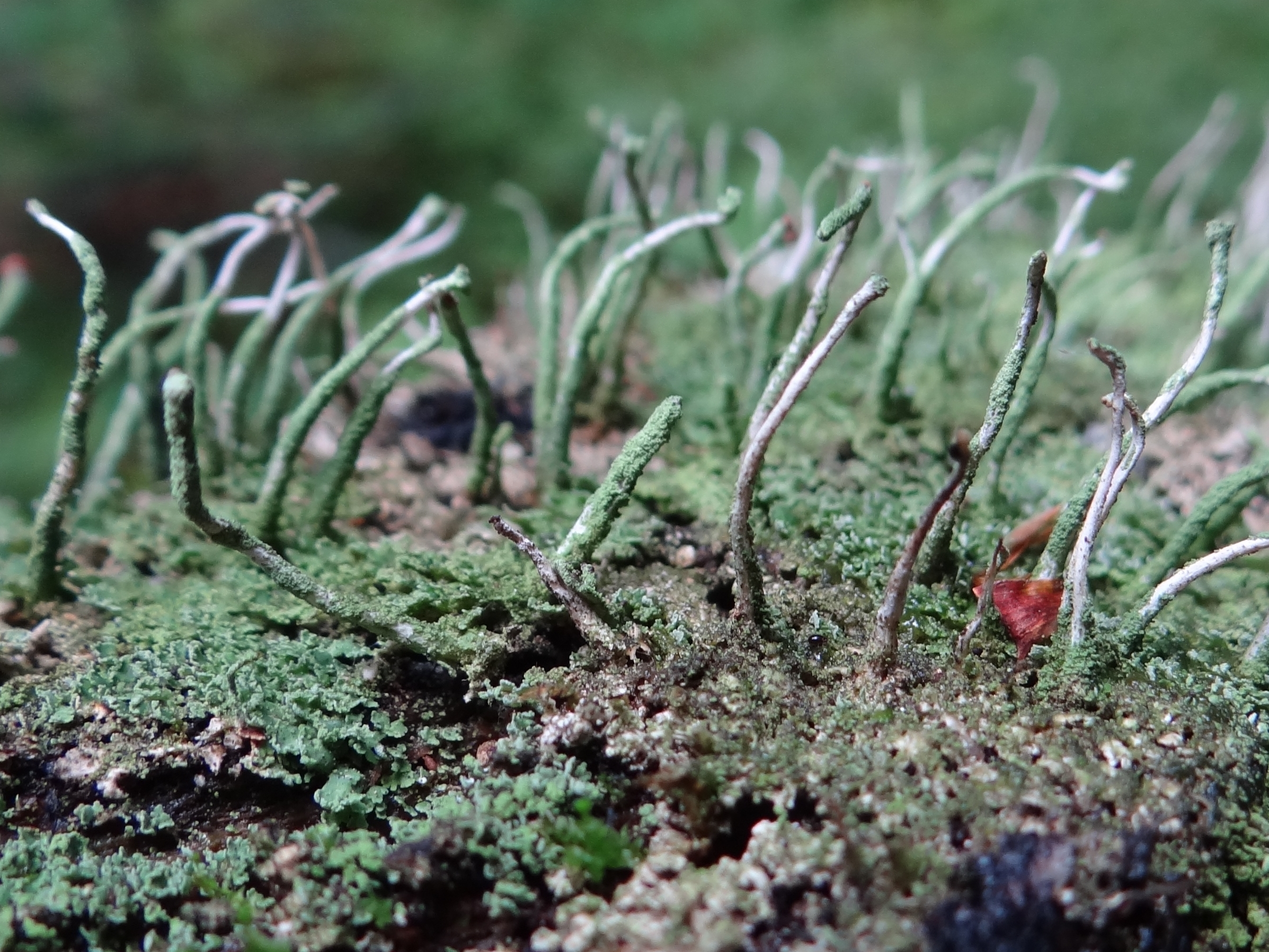
Cladonia glauca

- Cladonia galindezii Øvstedal (1988) – Antarctica
- Cladonia gallowayi S.Hammer (2003)
- Cladonia glabra Ahti (2000)
- Cladonia glacialis Kristinsson & Ahti (2009)
- Cladonia glauca Flörke (1828)
- Cladonia glebosa S.Hammer (2001) – Australia
- Cladonia gracilis (L.) Willd. (1787)
- Cladonia graeca Sipman & Ahti (2011)
- Cladonia granulosa (Vain.) Ahti (1986)
- Cladonia grayi G.Merr. ex Sandst. (1929)
- Cladonia grisea (Ahti) J.C.Wei (2020)
- Cladonia guianensis S.Stenroos (1989)
- Cladonia gumboskii Aptroot, M.F.Souza & Spielmann (2021) – Brazil

== H ==
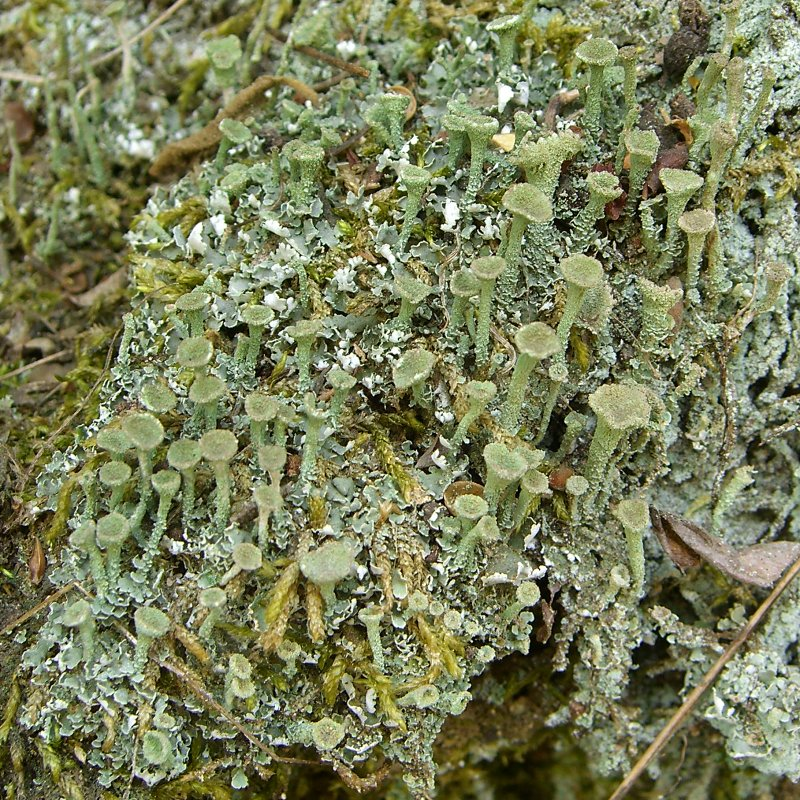
Cladonia hammeri

- Cladonia halei (Ahti) Ahti & DePriest (2001)
- Cladonia hammeri Ahti (2002)
- Cladonia hians Ahti (2000)
- Cladonia homchantarae Ahti & Parnmen (2008)
- Cladonia homosekikaica Nuno (1975)
- Cladonia huberi Ahti (2000)
- Cladonia humilis (With.) J.R.Laundon (1984)
- Cladonia hypomelaena (Vain.) S.Stenroos (2002)
- Cladonia hypoxantha Tuck. (1862)
- Cladonia hypoxanthoides Vain. (1887)

== I ==
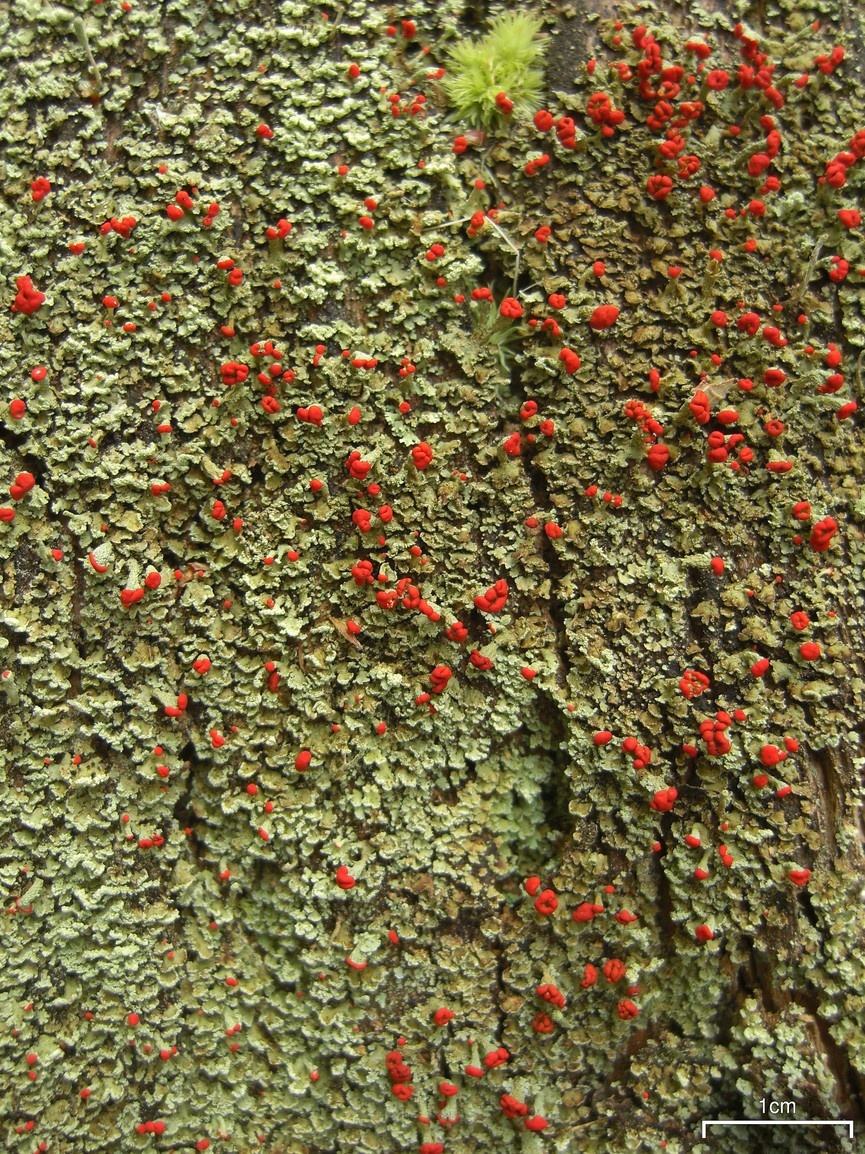
Cladonia incrassata

- Cladonia ibitipocae Ahti & S.Stenroos (1995)
- Cladonia ignatii Ahti, Pino-Bodas & J.W.McCarthy (2018)
- Cladonia imbricarica Kristinsson (1974) – Iceland
- Cladonia imbricata S.Hammer (2001) – Australia
- Cladonia imperialis Ahti & Marcelli (1995) – Minas Gerais
- Cladonia incerta S.Hammer (2003)
- Cladonia incrassata Flörke (1827)
- Cladonia indica Ahti & Upreti (2004)
- Cladonia inflata Aptroot & Cáceres (2018)
- Cladonia innominata Lendemer (2008)
- Cladonia insolita Ahti & Krog (1987) – Uganda
- Cladonia isabellina Vain. (1894)
- Cladonia isidiifera Ahti & Sipman (2013)
- Cladonia islandica Kristinsson & Ahti (2009)
- Cladonia itatiaiae Ahti & Marcelli (2000)

== J ==
- Cladonia jakutica Ahti (2007)
- Cladonia jaliscana Ahti & Guzm.-Dáv. (1998)

== K ==
- Cladonia kalbii (Ahti) Ahti & DePriest (2001)
- Cladonia krempelhuberi (Vain.) Zahlbr. (1927)
- Cladonia kriegeri (Ahti & S.Stenroos) Ahti & DePriest (2001)
- Cladonia krogiana Løfall & Timdal (2002)
- Cladonia kuringaiensis A.W.Archer (1980)

== L ==
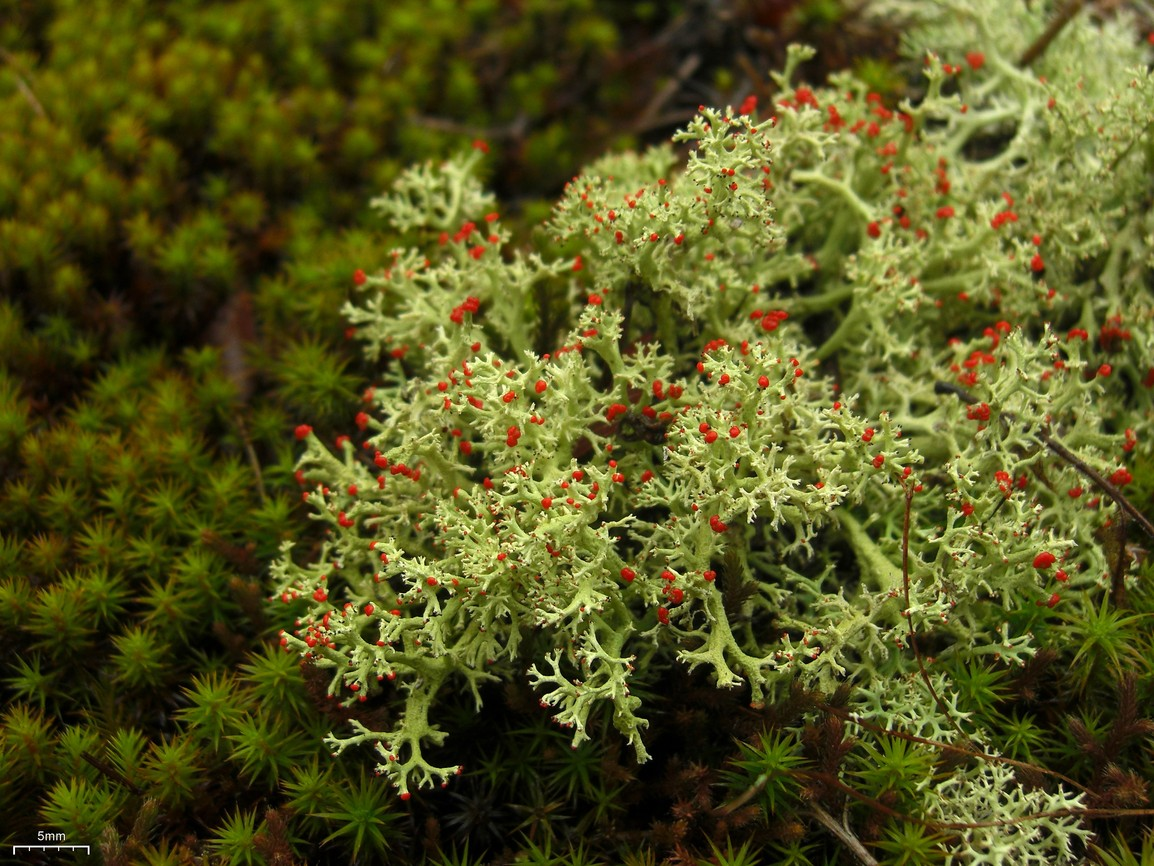
Cladonia leporina

- Cladonia lacryma S.Hammer (2001)
- Cladonia latiloba Ahti & Marcelli (2000)
- Cladonia leporina Fr. (1831)
- Cladonia leprocephala Ahti & S.Stenroos (1986) – Venezuela
- Cladonia leucophylla Ahti & Krog (1987) – Kenya
- Cladonia lichexanthonica Aptroot & Cáceres (2018) – Brazil
- Cladonia lingulata Ahti (2000) – Dominican Republic
- Cladonia litoralis Gumboski & Eliasaro (2011)
- Cladonia longisquama Ahti (2016) – Seychelles
- Cladonia lopezii S.Stenroos (1989) – Venezuela
- Cladonia luteoalba A.Wilson & Wheldon (1907)
- Cladonia lutescens Ahti, Upreti & Nayaka (2007) – India

== M ==
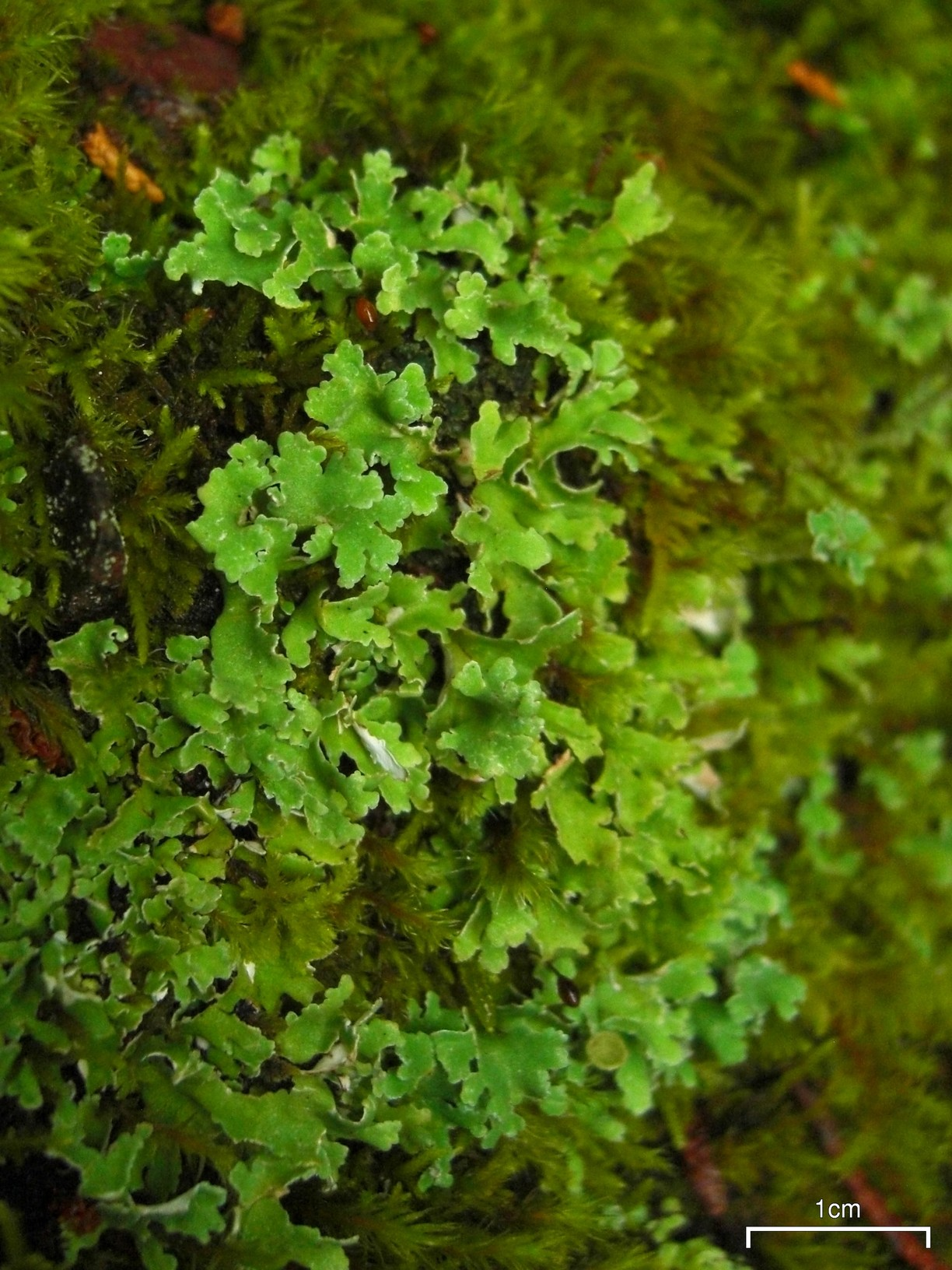
Cladonia macrophyllodes

- Cladonia maasii Ahti & Sipman (2013)
- Cladonia macilenta Hoffm. (1796)
- Cladonia macilentoides (Harm.) Aptroot & Volk. John (2015)
- Cladonia macrophylla (Schaer.) Stenh. (1865)
- Cladonia macrophylliza Vain. (1894)
- Cladonia macrophyllodes Nyl. (1875)
- Cladonia maculata Charnei, Eliasaro & Gumboski (2015)
- Cladonia marcellii Ahti & S.Stenroos (2000)
- Cladonia maritima K.Knudsen & Lendemer (2009)
- Cladonia mateocyatha Robbins (1925)
- Cladonia maxima (Asahina) Ahti (1978)
- Cladonia mediterranea P.A.Duvign. & Abbayes (1947)
- Cladonia megafurcata Aptroot (2022) – Brazil
- Cladonia megaphylla Ahti & Marcelli (2000)
- Cladonia melanopoda Ahti (1997)
- Cladonia meridensis Ahti & S.Stenroos (1986)
- Cladonia meridionalis Vain. (1927)
- Cladonia merochlorophaea Asahina (1940)
- Cladonia metacorallifera Asahina (1939)
- Cladonia metaminiata S.Stenroos & Ahti (1995)
- Cladonia mexicana Vain. (1887)
- Cladonia microphylla Ahti & Aptroot (2009)
- Cladonia microscypha Ahti & S.Stenroos 1986
- Cladonia minarum Ahti (1986)
- Cladonia miniata G.Mey. (1825)
- Cladonia minisaxicola Aptroot & Cáceres (2018) – Brazil
- Cladonia mitis Sandst. (1918)
- Cladonia mollis Ahti & Sipman (2013)
- Cladonia mongkolsukii Parnmen & Ahti (2011)
- Cladonia monomorpha Aptroot, Sipman & Herk (2001)
- Cladonia multiformis G.Merr. (1908)
- Cladonia multipartita (Müll.Arg.) Ahti (2000)
- Cladonia murrayi W.Martin (1962)
- Cladonia mutabilis Vain. (1887)

== N ==
- Cladonia nana Vain. (1894)
- Cladonia nashii Ahti (2002)
- Cladonia neozelandica Vain. (1894)
- Cladonia nitens Ahti (2007)
- Cladonia nitidella S.Hammer (2003)
- Cladonia norvegica Tønsberg & Holien (1984)
- Cladonia novochlorophaea (Sipman) Brodo & Ahti (1996)
- Cladonia nudicaulis S.Hammer (2001) – Australia

== O ==
- Cladonia obscurata Ahti (2000)
- Cladonia obtecta Ahti (2000)
- Cladonia ochracea L.Scriba (1923)
- Cladonia ochrochlora Flörke (1827)
- Cladonia oricola Ahti & S.Stenroos (2008)

== P ==
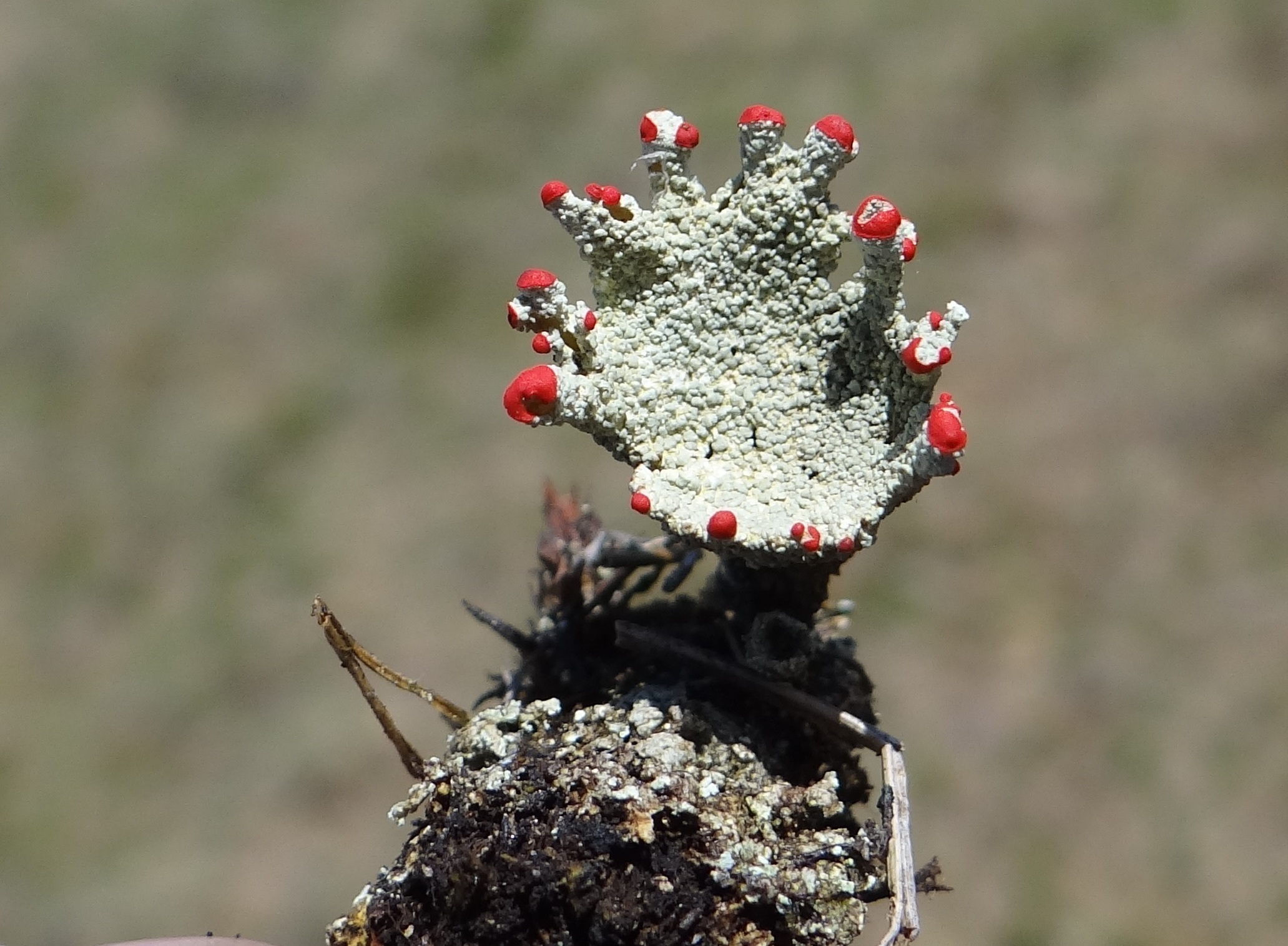
Cladonia pleurota

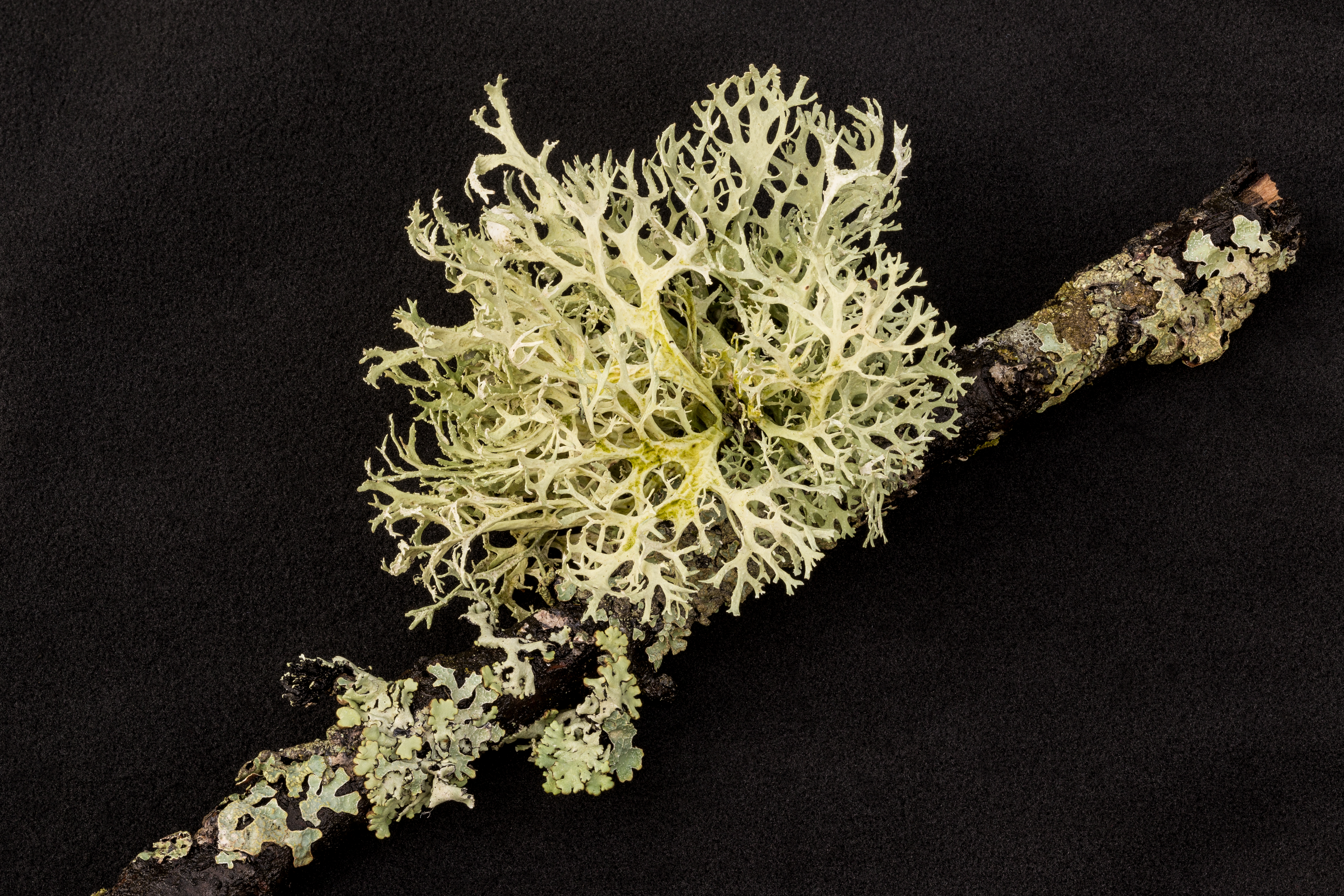
Cladonia portentosa (with Hypogymnia physodes)

- Cladonia paeminosa A.W.Archer (1989)
- Cladonia pallens Ahti & Krog (1987)
- Cladonia palmicola Ahti & Fleig (1995)
- Cladonia paranaensis Charnei, Eliasaro & Gumboski (2015)
- Cladonia parasitica (Hoffm.) Hoffm. (1796)
- Cladonia parva Ahti & Krog (1987)
- Cladonia parvipes (Vain.) S.Stenroos (2000)
- Cladonia penicillata (Vain.) Ahti & Marcelli (1995)
- Cladonia perfilata Hook.f. (1837)
- Cladonia persphacelata Sipman & Ahti (2013)
- Cladonia pertricosa Kremp. (1881)
- Cladonia petrophila R.C.Harris (1992)
- Cladonia peziziformis (With.) J.R.Laundon (1984)
- Cladonia phyllophora Hoffm. (1796)
- Cladonia piedadensis Ahti (2000)
- Cladonia pityrophylla Nyl. (1874)
- Cladonia pleurota (Flörke) Schaer. (1850)
- Cladonia pocillum (Ach.) O.J.Rich. (1877)
- Cladonia polydactyla (Flörke) Spreng. (1827)
- Cladonia polyscypha Ahti & L.Xavier (1993)
- Cladonia polystomata Ahti & Sipman (2000)
- Cladonia polytypa Vain. (1887)
- Cladonia portentosa (Dufour) Coem. (1865)
- Cladonia praetermissa A.W.Archer (1984) – Australia
- Cladonia prancei Ahti (2000)
- Cladonia prostrata A.Evans (1952)
- Cladonia pseudofissa (Asahina) Ahti, Pino-Bodas & S.Stenroos (2015)
- Cladonia pseudotapperi Øvstedal (2010)
- Cladonia pulchra S.Hammer (2003)
- Cladonia pulverulenta (L.Scriba) Ahti (2000)
- Cladonia pulvinella S.Hammer (1991)
- Cladonia pulviniformis Ahti (1990)
- Cladonia pumila Ahti (2000)
- Cladonia pycnoclada (Pers.) Nyl. (1867)
- Cladonia pyxidata (L.) Hoffm. (1796)

== Q ==
- Cladonia quiririensis Charnei, Eliasaro & Gumboski (2015)

== R ==
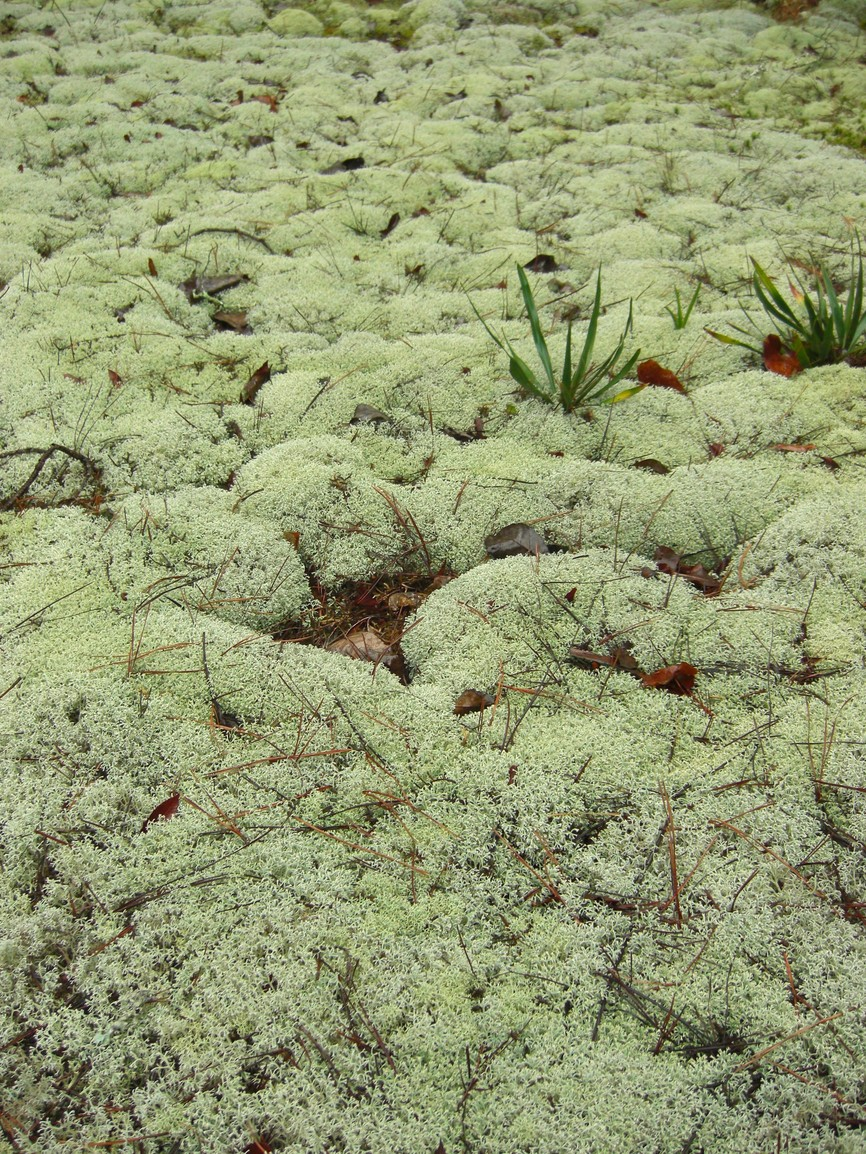
Cladonia rangiferina

- Cladonia ramulosa (With.) J.R.Laundon (1984)
- Cladonia rangiferina (L.) Weber (1780)
- Cladonia rangiformis Hoffm. (1796)
- Cladonia rappii A.Evans (1952)
- Cladonia ravenelii Tuck. (1882)
- Cladonia recta Ahti & Sipman (2013)
- Cladonia recticaulis Ahti & Parnmen (2008)
- Cladonia rei Schaer. (1823)
- Cladonia rhodoleuca Vain. (1887)
- Cladonia rigida (Hook.f. & Taylor) Hampe (1856)
- Cladonia robbinsii A.Evans (1944)
- Cladonia robusta Ahti (1986)
- Cladonia rotundata Ahti (1961)
- Cladonia rubrotincta Vtípilová, Timdal, Resl & Steinová (2025) – Norway
- Cladonia rudis Ahti & Parnmen (2008)
- Cladonia rugicaulis Ahti (1993)
- Cladonia rugulosa Ahti (1986)
- Cladonia rupununii Ahti & Sipman (2013)

== S ==
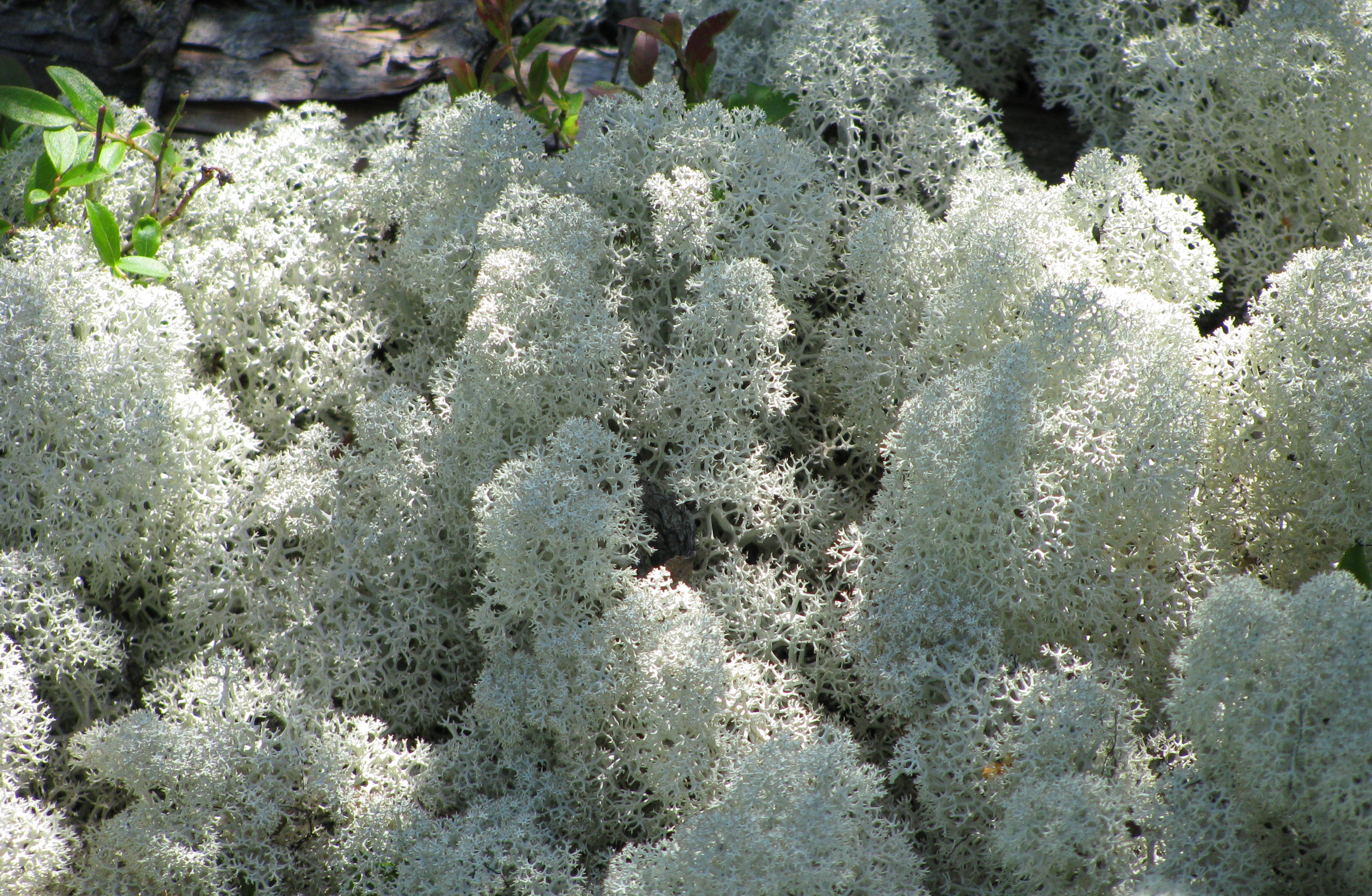
Cladonia stellaris

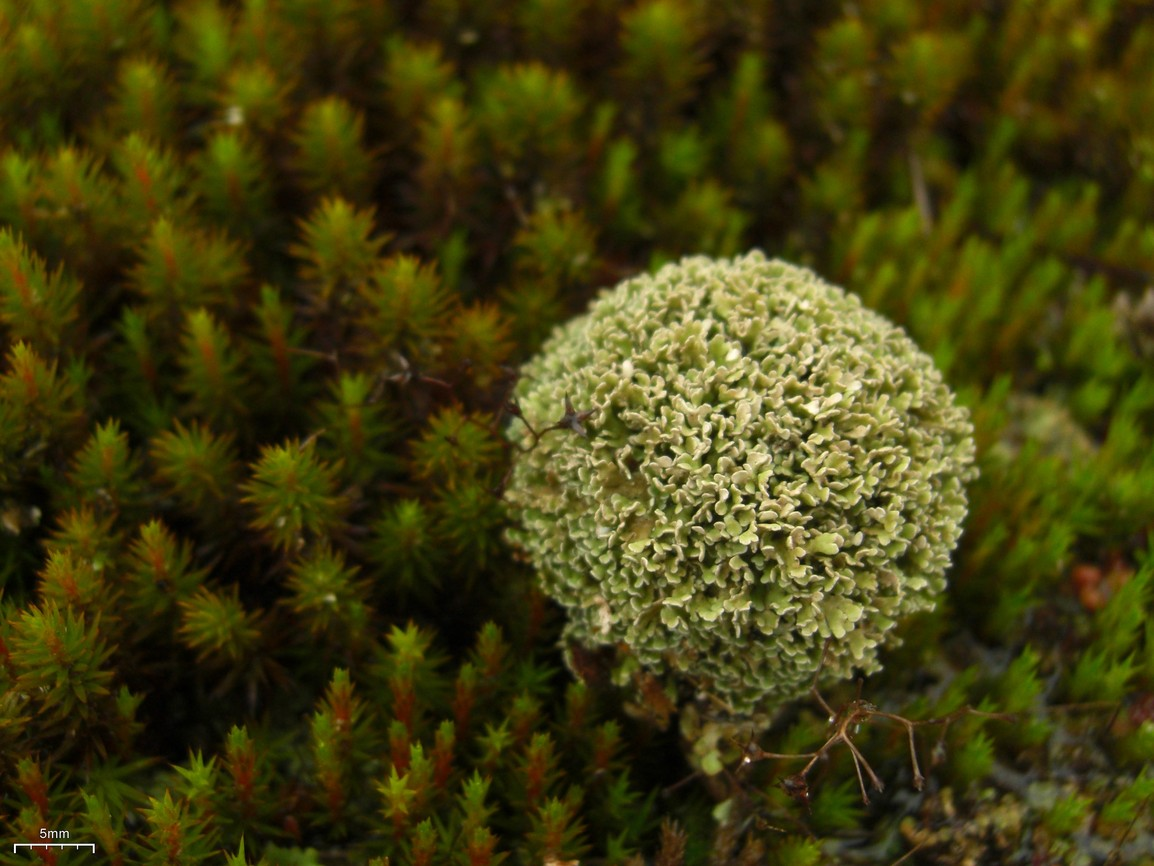
Cladonia strepsilis

- Cladonia salmonea S.Stenroos (1989)
- Cladonia salzmannii Nyl. (1887)
- Cladonia sandstedei Abbayes (1938)
- Cladonia sarmentosa (Hook.f. & Taylor) C.W.Dodge (1948)
- Cladonia scabriuscula (Delise) Nyl. (1876)
- Cladonia scholanderi Abbayes (1949)
- Cladonia scotteri Ahti & E.S.Hansen (2011)
- Cladonia secundana Nyl. (1874)
- Cladonia signata (Eschw.) Vain. (1887)
- Cladonia singhii Ahti & P.K.Dixit (2002)
- Cladonia sinoaltaica Ahti & Davydov (2016)
- Cladonia sipmanii Ahti (2000)
- Cladonia sobolescens Nyl. ex Vain. (1887)
- Cladonia solida Vain. (1890)
- Cladonia southlandica W.Martin (1962)
- Cladonia spathulata Ahti (2000)
- Cladonia sphacelata Vain. (1887)
- Cladonia spiculata (Ach.) Ahti (1986)
- Cladonia spinea Ahti (1986)
- Cladonia sprucei Ahti (1961)
- Cladonia squamosa Hoffm. (1796)
- Cladonia staufferi Abbayes (1966)
- Cladonia stellaris (Opiz) Pouzar & Vězda (1971)
- Cladonia stenroosiae Ahti (2002)
- Cladonia stereoclada Abbayes (1946)
- Cladonia steyermarkii Ahti (1986)
- Cladonia stipitata Lendemer & B.P.Hodk. (2009)
- Cladonia strangulata S.Hammer (2003)
- Cladonia strepsilis (Ach.) Mont. (1839)
- Cladonia stricta (Nyl.) Nyl. (1869)
- Cladonia stygia (Fr.) Ruoss (1985)
- Cladonia subcariosa Nyl. (1876)
- Cladonia subcervicornis (Vain.) Kernst. (1900)
- Cladonia subdelicatula Vain. ex Asahina (1963)
- Cladonia subfimbriata Ahti (2002)
- Cladonia subfurcata (Nyl.) Arnold (1885)
- Cladonia subincrassata S.Y.Guo (1996)
- Cladonia subminiata S.Stenroos (1989)
- Cladonia subpityrea Sandst. (1928)
- Cladonia subradiata (Vain.) Sandst. (1922)
- Cladonia subreticulata Ahti (1973)
- Cladonia subsphacelata Sipman & Ahti (2013)
- Cladonia subsquamosa Kremp. (1874)
- Cladonia substellata Vain. (1887)
- Cladonia subsubulata Nyl. (1876)
- Cladonia subtenuis (Abbayes) Mattick (1940)
- Cladonia subulata (L.) Weber ex F.H.Wigg. (1780)
- Cladonia sufflata Ahti (1990)
- Cladonia sulphurina (Michx.) Fr. (1831)
- Cladonia sumatrana Ahti (2016)
- Cladonia symphoriza Nyl. (1867)
- Cladonia symphycarpa (Ehrh. ex Schrad.) Fr. (1826)

== T ==
- Cladonia tachirae Ahti (2000)
- Cladonia tasmanica Ahti (1961)
- Cladonia tenerrima (Ahti) S.Hammer (2003)
- Cladonia termitarum Ahti (2013)
- Cladonia tessellata Ahti & Kashiw. (1984)
- Cladonia testaceopallens Vain. (1894)
- Cladonia teuvoana Pino-Bodas, Burgaz & Aptroot (2024)
- Cladonia transcendens (Vain.) Vain. (1898)
- Cladonia trassii Ahti (1998)
- Cladonia turgida Ehrh. ex Hoffm. (1796)
- Cladonia turgidior (Nyl.) Ahti (1977)

== U ==
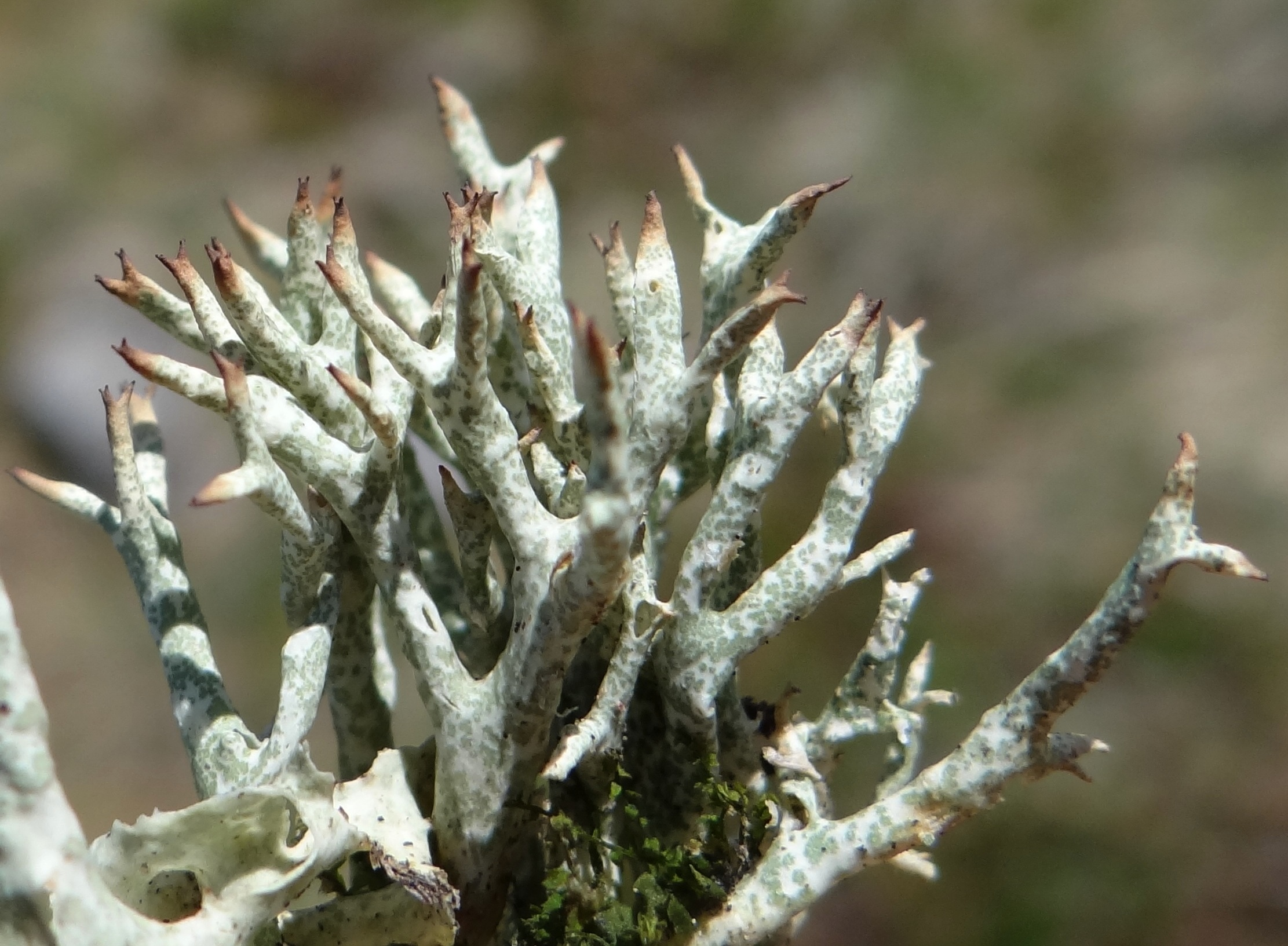
Cladonia uncialis

- Cladonia uliginosa (Ahti) Ahti (1998)
- Cladonia umbellata Ahti & Krog (1987)
- Cladonia uncialis (L.) Weber ex F.H.Wigg. (1780)
- Cladonia usambarensis Ahti & Krog (1987)
- Cladonia ustulata (Hook.f. & Taylor) Leight. (1867)

== V ==
- Cladonia vescula Ahti, Kukwa & Flakus (2016)

== W ==
- Cladonia wainioi Savicz (1914)
- Cladonia weymouthii F.Wilson ex A.W.Archer (1985)

== Z ==
- Cladonia zebrathallina Aptroot & Spielmann (2021) – Brazil
- Cladonia zopfii Vain. (1919)
