= Cladonia cyanopora =

Scientific classification
- Kingdom: Fungi
- Division: Ascomycota
- Class: Lecanoromycetes
- Order: Lecanorales
- Family: Cladoniaceae
- Genus: Cladonia
- Species: C. cyanopora

Binomial name
- Cladonia cyanopora S.Hammer (2003)
- Holotype: Awarua Wetland, New Zealand

Species of lichen

Cladonia cyanopora is a species of fruticose lichen in the family Cladoniaceae. Found in Australia and New Zealand, it was formally described as a new species in 2003 by the lichenologist Samuel Hammer. He collected the type specimen from the Awarua Wetland, south of Invercargill, where it was growing under Leptospermum on stabilised sand.

The primary thallus of Cladonia cyanopora is squamulose, persistent, and features sinuous, lacinated, elongated, and somewhat coralloid forms, with some parts partly buried. The podetia are more or less cylindrical or flattened, either terete or dorsiventral, and branched. They have a glaucous or bluish hue (for which the lichen is named), with perforated axils, decurved branches, and helmet-shaped tips. They contain thamnolic acid.

== See also ==
- List of Cladonia species
