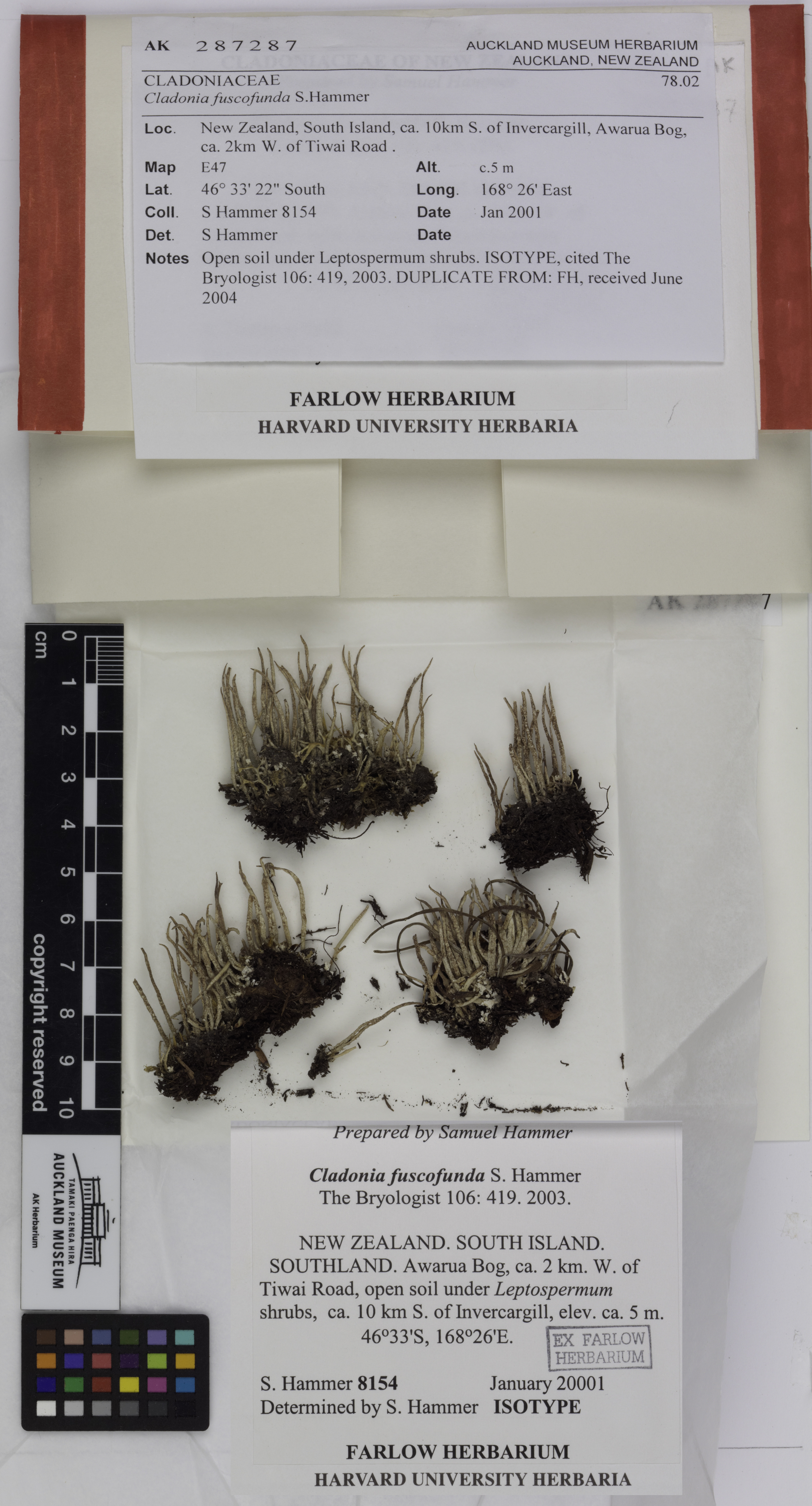
- Herbarium specimen of Cladonia fuscofunda

Scientific classification
- Kingdom: Fungi
- Division: Ascomycota
- Class: Lecanoromycetes
- Order: Lecanorales
- Family: Cladoniaceae
- Genus: Cladonia
- Species: C. fuscofunda

Binomial name
- Cladonia fuscofunda S.Hammer (2003)
- Holotype: Awarua Wetland, New Zealand

= Cladonia fuscofunda =

Species of lichen

Cladonia fuscofunda is a species of fruticose lichen in the family Cladoniaceae. Found in New Zealand, it was formally described as a new species in 2003 by the lichenologist Samuel Hammer. He collected the type specimen from the Awarua Wetland in Southland, where it was growing on soil under Leptospermum shrubs.

The primary thallus of Cladonia fuscofunda is squamulose (scaly) and evanescent. The podetia are common, brown or glaucous, scyphose or subulate, rarely swollen, esorediate at the base, and either esorediate or sorediate at the tip with farinose (floury) soredia. The apothecia (fruiting bodies) are dark-coloured. They contain fumarprotocetraric acid.

== See also ==
- List of Cladonia species
