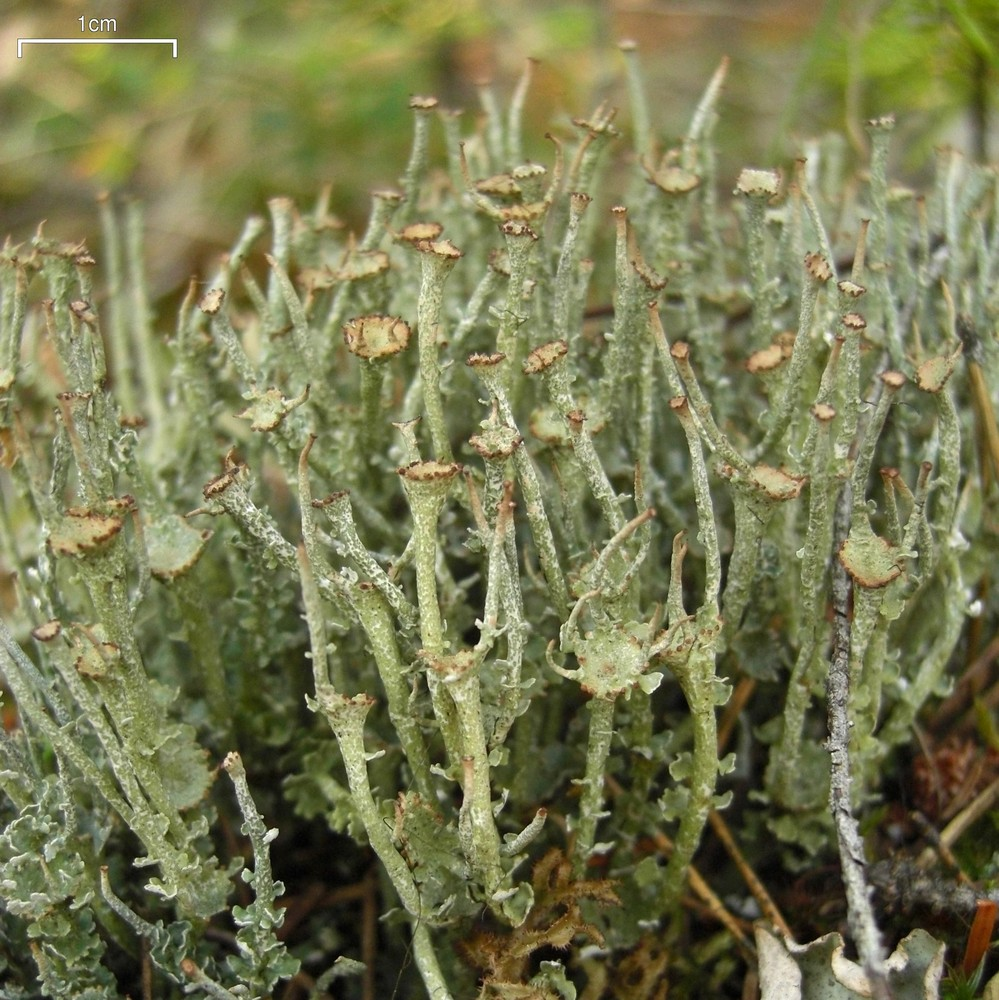

Conservation status
- Secure (NatureServe)

Scientific classification
- Kingdom: Fungi
- Division: Ascomycota
- Class: Lecanoromycetes
- Order: Lecanorales
- Family: Cladoniaceae
- Genus: Cladonia
- Species: C. ecmocyna

Binomial name
- Cladonia ecmocyna (Ach.) Leight. (1866)

Synonyms
- Cenomyce ecmocyna Ach. (1810)

= Cladonia ecmocyna =

Species of lichen

Cladonia ecmocyna or the frosted cup lichen is a species of fruticose, cup lichen in the family Cladoniaceae. It was first scientifically described as a new species in 1810 by Swedish lichenologist Erik Acharius as Cenomyce ecmocyna. British botanist William Allport Leighton transferred it to the genus Cladonia in 1866. In North America, it is known colloquially as the "frosted cladonia".

== See also ==
- List of Cladonia species
