= Cladonia camerunensis =

Scientific classification
- Domain: Eukaryota
- Kingdom: Fungi
- Division: Ascomycota
- Class: Lecanoromycetes
- Order: Lecanorales
- Family: Cladoniaceae
- Genus: Cladonia
- Species: C. camerunensis

Binomial name
- Cladonia camerunensis Ahti & Flakus (2016)

Species of lichen

Cladonia camerunensis is a species of lichen in the family Cladoniaceae. Found in Cameroon, it was formally described as a new species in 2016 by lichenologists Teuvo Ahti and Adam Flakus. The type specimen was collected on Minloua Mountain, west of Yaoundé, at an altitude of 780 m (2,560 ft). Here the lichen was found growing among plant debris over rock in open areas. The species is only known to occur in two locations on Minloua Mountain, which is a tropical inselberg. Secondary chemicals that are found in the lichen include barbatic acid (a major metabolite) and didymic acid (a minor component).

== See also ==
- List of Cladonia species
