= Cladonia lutescens =

Scientific classification
- Kingdom: Fungi
- Division: Ascomycota
- Class: Lecanoromycetes
- Order: Lecanorales
- Family: Cladoniaceae
- Genus: Cladonia
- Species: C. lutescens

Binomial name
- Cladonia lutescens Ahti, Upreti & Nayaka (2007)

Species of lichen

Cladonia lutescens is a species of fruticose lichen in the family Cladoniaceae. It occurs in high-altitude conditions of the Himalayas.

== Taxonomy ==
First described in 2007 by lichenologists Teuvo Ahti, Dalip Kumar Upreti, and Sanjeeva Nayaka, Cladonia lutescens derives its name from the Latin lutescens, reflecting the unique yellowish tinge of its thallus, or body. The holotype, the reference specimen for this species, was discovered in Chitkul forest area, a high-altitude region in Himachal Pradesh, India. The species falls within the traditional section Cocciferae of genus Cladonia, which includes several ochraceous-fruited members.

== Description ==
One of the hallmarks of Cladonia lutescens is its primary thallus, which is inconspicuous yet detailed. The squamules, tiny scale-like structures, range from 0.3 to 1.5 mm wide. These gradually turn from a cream to a yellowish-grey hue as they age, developing granular soredia, or vegetative reproductive structures, along the way. The podetia, the lichen's stalk-like structures, are slender with a cream yellow to yellow colour. These structures, measuring from 0.35 to 1.5 cm tall, rarely branch out but rather ascend in a taper towards the top. They may also bear minuscule squamules near the base. The soredia, measuring between 20 and 40 μm, dot the podetia's surface like fine dust.

Usnic acid and homosekikaic acid occur within Cladonia lutescens but it does not respond to the standard chemical spot tests. It closely aligns with the Cocciferae section within its genus. A comparison can be drawn with C. bacilliformis, a species found across the boreal zone's coniferous trees. However, the presence of homosekikaic acid, absent in C. bacilliformis, helps distinguish Cladonia lutescens.

== Habitat and distribution ==
Found only in Himachal Pradesh's Himalayan region, Cladonia lutescens prefers the bark of coniferous trees, especially those in the genus Pinus. It thrives in harsh conditions at altitudes ranging between 3,000 and 4,000 m (9,800 and 13,100 ft).

== See also ==
- List of Cladonia species
