= Cladonia longisquama =

Scientific classification
- Domain: Eukaryota
- Kingdom: Fungi
- Division: Ascomycota
- Class: Lecanoromycetes
- Order: Lecanorales
- Family: Cladoniaceae
- Genus: Cladonia
- Species: C. longisquama

Binomial name
- Cladonia longisquama Ahti (2016)

Species of lichen

Cladonia longisquama is a species of fruticose lichen in the family Cladoniaceae. It occurs in the Seychelles, where it grows on moss-covered rocks.

It is characterized by the presence of barbatic acid and remarkably large primary squamules, which are 15–30 mm long and 2–8 mm wide. The primary thallus is well-developed and consists of large, somewhat laciniate squamules that are greenish-grey above and whitish below. The squamules have a smooth corticate surface and are finely sorediate, especially along the margins. Podetia are not seen in Cladonia longisquama, but early signs of podetia development at a squamule margin suggest a phyllopodiate development, meaning the podetium originates from the tip or edge of a squamule and extends upward, eventually giving rise to fruiting bodies. Its hymenial discs or conidiomata are not known, and its secondary chemistry includes barbatic acid and unidentified fatty acids.

This species is native to the Seychelles, where it grows on mossy rocks. Cladonia longisquama is similar to Cladonia meridionalis, which is found in tropical South America. The latter has more rounded lobes and its major secondary compound is obtusatic acid, produced alongside accessory barbatic acid. The hymenial discs are red in C. meridionalis, and C. longisquama is also expected to have red-fruited discs. In molecular studies, C. longisquama was placed in the "Supergroup Cocciferae", near Cladonia weymouthii, an austral, red-fruited species with smaller squamules. Cladonia longisquama was formally described as a new species in 2016 by Finnish lichenologist Teuvo Ahti.

== See also ==
- List of Cladonia species
