= Cladonia nitidella =

Scientific classification
- Kingdom: Fungi
- Division: Ascomycota
- Class: Lecanoromycetes
- Order: Lecanorales
- Family: Cladoniaceae
- Genus: Cladonia
- Species: C. nitidella

Binomial name
- Cladonia nitidella S.Hammer (2003)
- Holotype: Rainbow Reach above Waiau River, New Zealand

Species of lichen

Cladonia nitidella is a species of fruticose lichen in the family Cladoniaceae. It is found in New Zealand, where it grows on bare soil and among mosses in often moist, partially sun-exposed habitats. It was formally described as a new species in 2003 by the lichenologist Samuel Hammer. He collected the type specimen from Rainbow Reach above Waiau River, about 10 km south of Te Anau, at an elevation of 200 m.

The primary thallus of Cladonia nitidella is squamulose, evanescent, and crenate-lobed. The podetia are more or less cylindrical, rough, corticate or ecorticate, esorediate, squamulose, and shiny. They contain two secondary metabolites: fumarprotocetraric acid and usnic acid.

== See also ==
- List of Cladonia species
