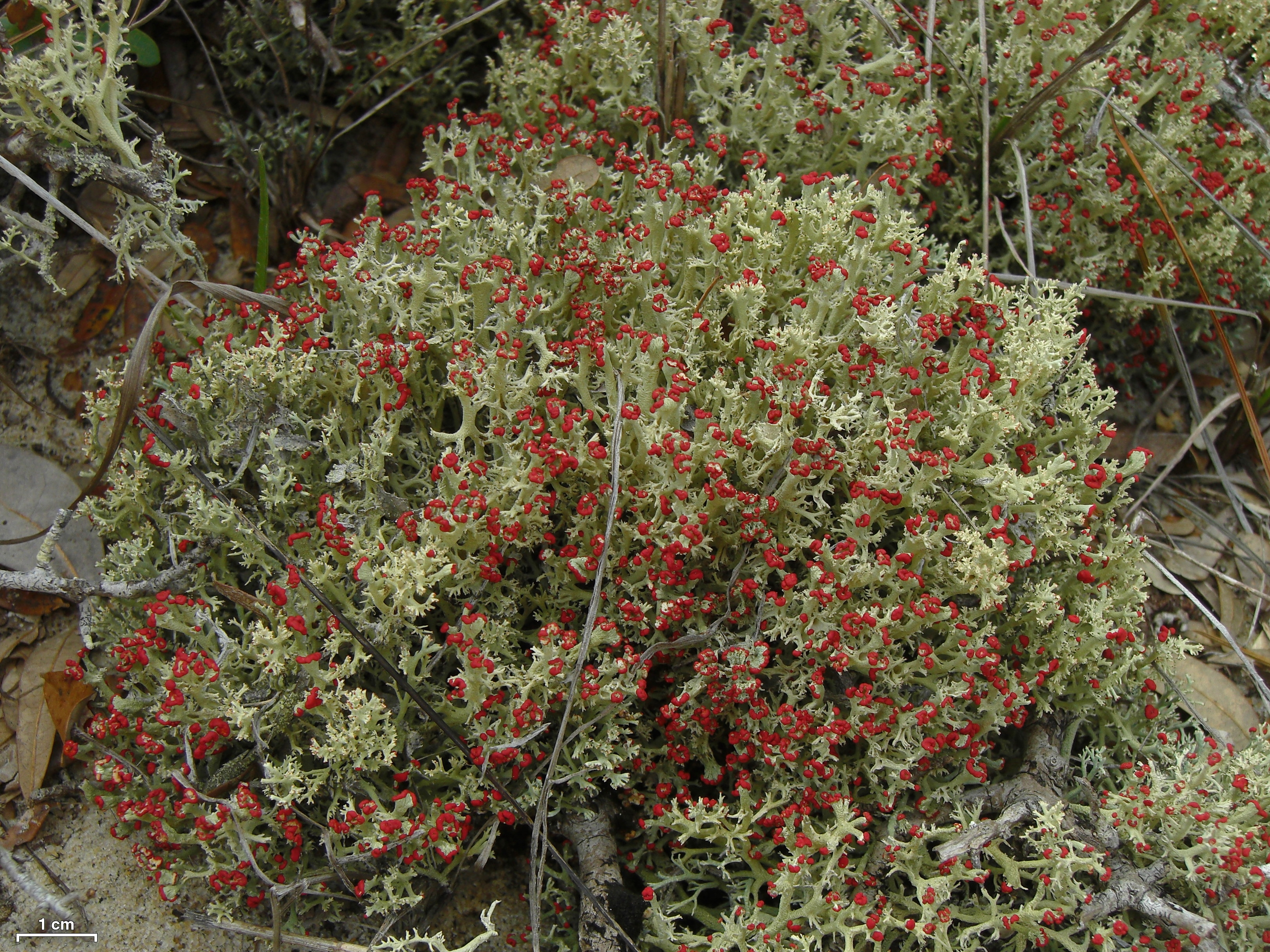

Conservation status
- Apparently Secure (NatureServe)

Scientific classification
- Kingdom: Fungi
- Division: Ascomycota
- Class: Lecanoromycetes
- Order: Lecanorales
- Family: Cladoniaceae
- Genus: Cladonia
- Species: C. leporina

Binomial name
- Cladonia leporina Fr. (1831)

= Cladonia leporina =

Species of lichen

Cladonia leporina is a species of lichen in the family Cladoniaceae. It was described as a new species in 1831 by Swedish mycologist Elias Magnus Fries. In North America, it is colloquially known as the "jester lichen". A sighting of a population of the lichen in New York (state) is the northernmost known occurrence of this species.

== See also ==
- List of Cladonia species
