= Cladonia pulchra =

Scientific classification
- Kingdom: Fungi
- Division: Ascomycota
- Class: Lecanoromycetes
- Order: Lecanorales
- Family: Cladoniaceae
- Genus: Cladonia
- Species: C. pulchra

Binomial name
- Cladonia pulchra S.Hammer (2003)
- Holotype: Heaphy Track, Nelson, New Zealand

Species of lichen

Cladonia pulchra is a species of fruticose lichen in the family Cladoniaceae. Found in New Zealand, it was formally described as a new species in 2003 by the lichenologist Samuel Hammer. He collected the type specimen from Heaphy Track, about 15 km north of Karamea, where it was growing on rotting wood.

The primary thallus of Cladonia pulchra is squamulose (scaly), persistent, lacinated, esorediate, and somewhat shiny. The podetia are tubular, subulate, esorediate, corticate, and covered with overlapping squamules, with some parts partially buried. They contain thamnolic acid, a secondary metabolite that results in K+ (yellow) and P+ (yellow) spot test reactions.

== See also ==
- List of Cladonia species
