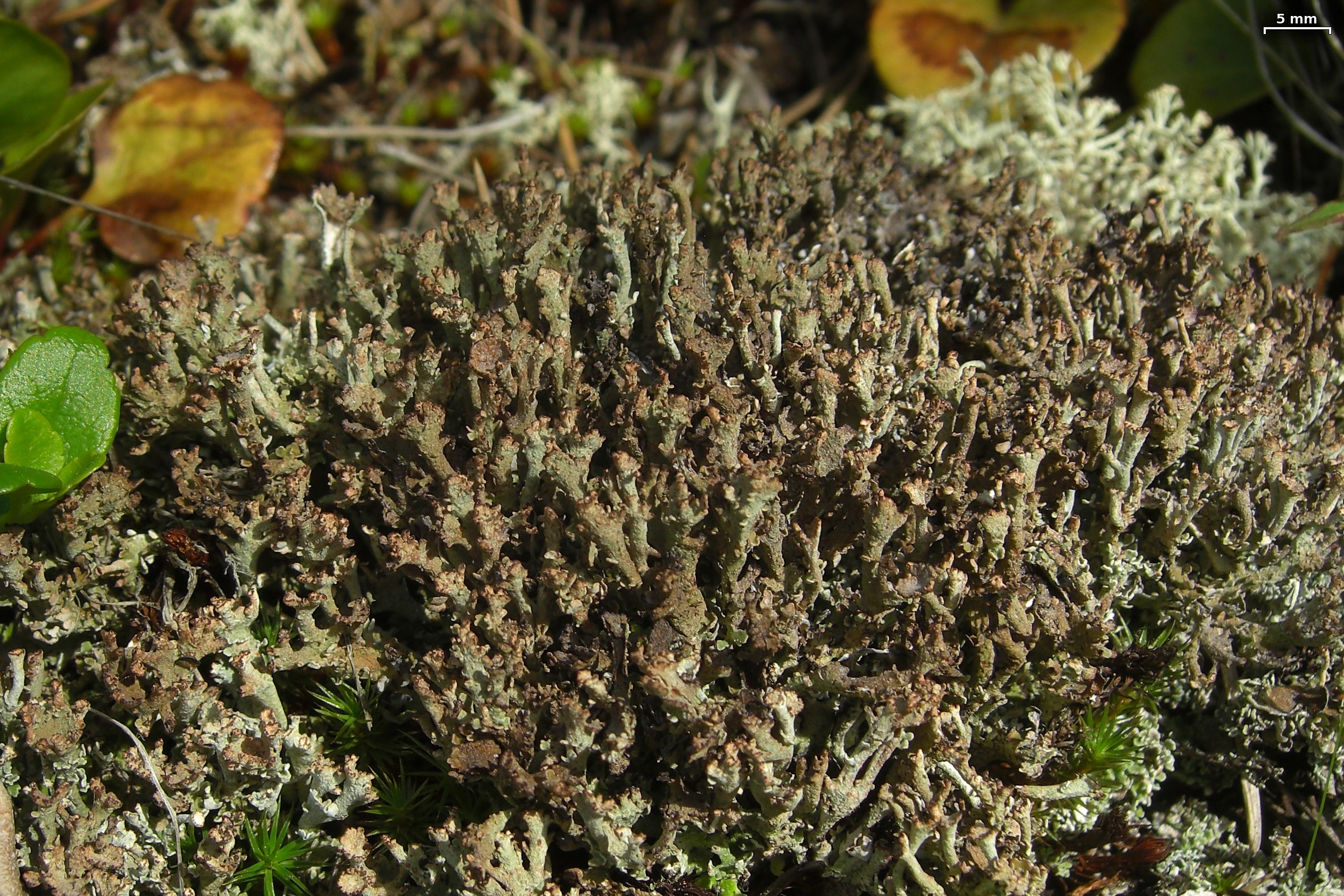

Conservation status
- Secure (NatureServe)

Scientific classification
- Kingdom: Fungi
- Division: Ascomycota
- Class: Lecanoromycetes
- Order: Lecanorales
- Family: Cladoniaceae
- Genus: Cladonia
- Species: C. phyllophora

Binomial name
- Cladonia phyllophora Hoffm. (1796)

Synonyms
- List: Baeomyces alcicornis var. phyllophorus (Hoffm.) Ach. (1803); Cenomyce damicornis var. phyllophora (Hoffm.) Ach. (1810); Cenomyce verticillata var. phyllophora (Hoffm.) Flörke ex Sommerf. (1826); Cladonia degenerans var. phyllophora (Hoffm.) Rabenh. (1845); Cladonia gracilis f. phyllophora (Hoffm.) Mudd (1861); Cladonia degenerans subvar. phyllophora (Hoffm.) Linds. (1867); Cladonia alcicornis var. phyllophora (Hoffm.) Malbr. (1868); Cladonia cornucopioides f. phyllophora (Hoffm.) Leight. (1871); Cladonia degenerans f. phyllophora (Hoffm.) Vain. (1894); Cladonia foliacea f. phyllophora (Hoffm.) Harm. (1896); Cladonia cervicornis f. phyllophora (Hoffm.) Dalla Torre & Sarnth. (1902); Lichen phyllophorus Ehrh. ex Flörke (1807); Capitularia degenerans Flörke (1810); Baeomyces degenerans (Flörke) Wahlenb. (1812); Cenomyce degenerans (Flörke) Flörke (1819); Cladonia degenerans (Flörke) Spreng. (1827); Cladonia degenerans var. glabra Schaer. (1833); Cladonia gracilis d degenerans (Flörke) Mudd (1861); Cladonia gracilis var. degenerans (Flörke) Lange (1872); Cladonia gracilis f. degenerans (Flörke) H.Mort. (1872); Cladonia degenerans f. glabra (Schaer.) Bosch (1853)

= Cladonia phyllophora =

Species of lichen

Cladonia phyllophora, the felt Cladonia, is a widely distributed species of fruticose lichen in the family Cladoniaceae. It was described as a new species in 1796 by the German naturalist Georg Franz Hoffmann. The lichen, which grows on rotting wood and on soil in both open and shaded environments, has been recorded from Antarctica, Asia, Europe, North America, Oceania, and South America.

== See also ==
- List of Cladonia species
