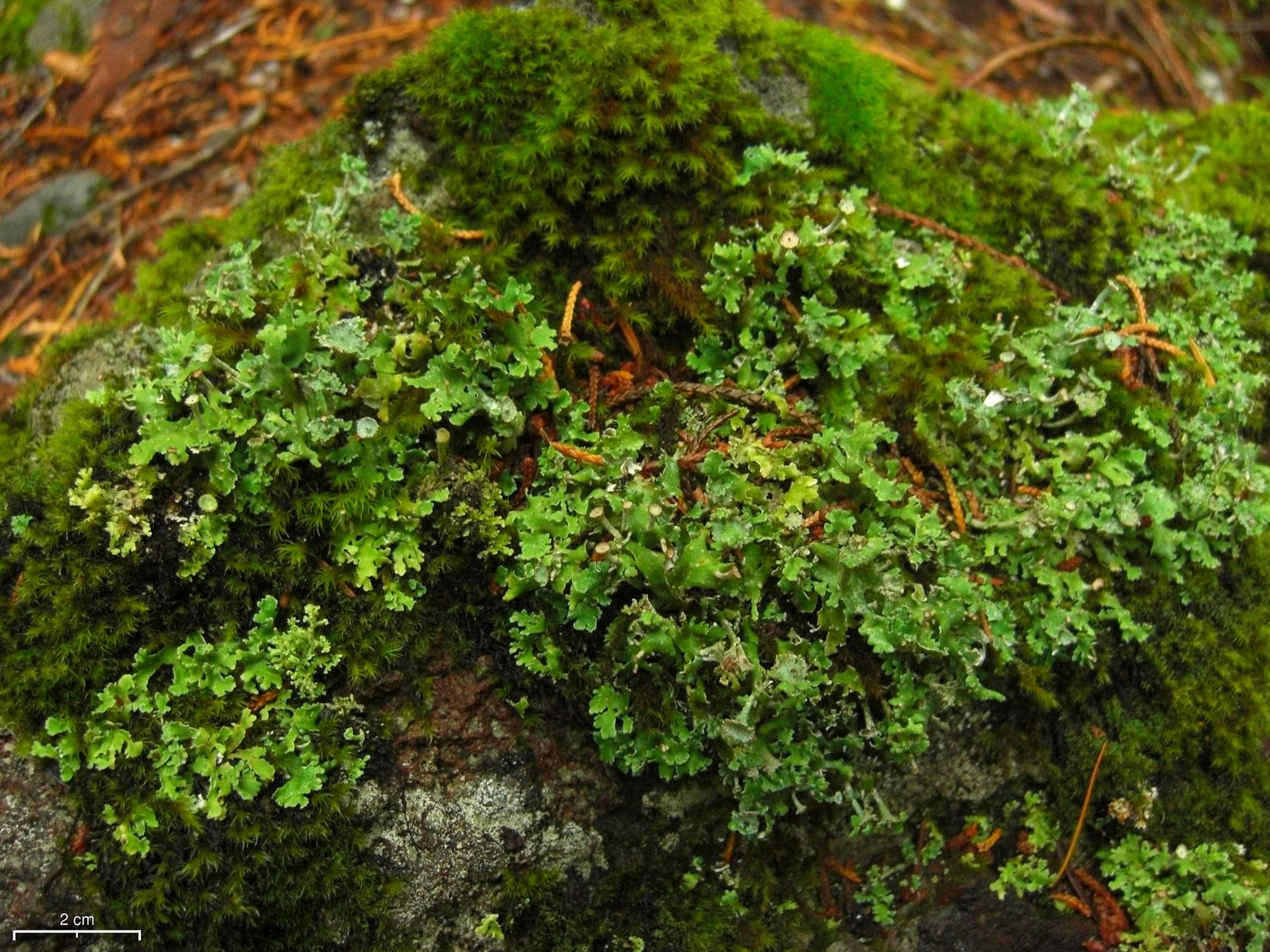

Conservation status
- Secure (NatureServe)

Scientific classification
- Kingdom: Fungi
- Division: Ascomycota
- Class: Lecanoromycetes
- Order: Lecanorales
- Family: Cladoniaceae
- Genus: Cladonia
- Species: C. macrophyllodes

Binomial name
- Cladonia macrophyllodes Nyl. (1875)

= Cladonia macrophyllodes =

Species of lichen

Cladonia macrophyllodes, commonly known as the large-leaved cladonia or the large-leaved cup lichen, is a species of cup lichen in the family Cladoniaceae.

== See also ==
- List of Cladonia species
