= Cladonia gallowayi =

Scientific classification
- Kingdom: Fungi
- Division: Ascomycota
- Class: Lecanoromycetes
- Order: Lecanorales
- Family: Cladoniaceae
- Genus: Cladonia
- Species: C. gallowayi

Binomial name
- Cladonia gallowayi S.Hammer (2003)
- Holotype: near Lake Rotoroa, New Zealand

Species of lichen

Cladonia gallowayi is a species of fruticose lichen in the family Cladoniaceae. Found in New Zealand, it was formally described as a new species in 2003 by the lichenologist Samuel Hammer. The species epithet honours David J. Galloway, who collected the type specimen from White Pine Swamp near Lake Rotoroa in Nelson, New Zealand in 1977.

The primary thallus is squamulose (scaly) and can be either evanescent or persistent. The podetia are either corticate or naked, rarely branched, subulate, with perforated axils, and have a surface that is either blistered or abundantly squamulose. The apothecia (fruiting bodies) are dark-coloured. They contain squamatic acid.

== See also ==
- List of Cladonia species
