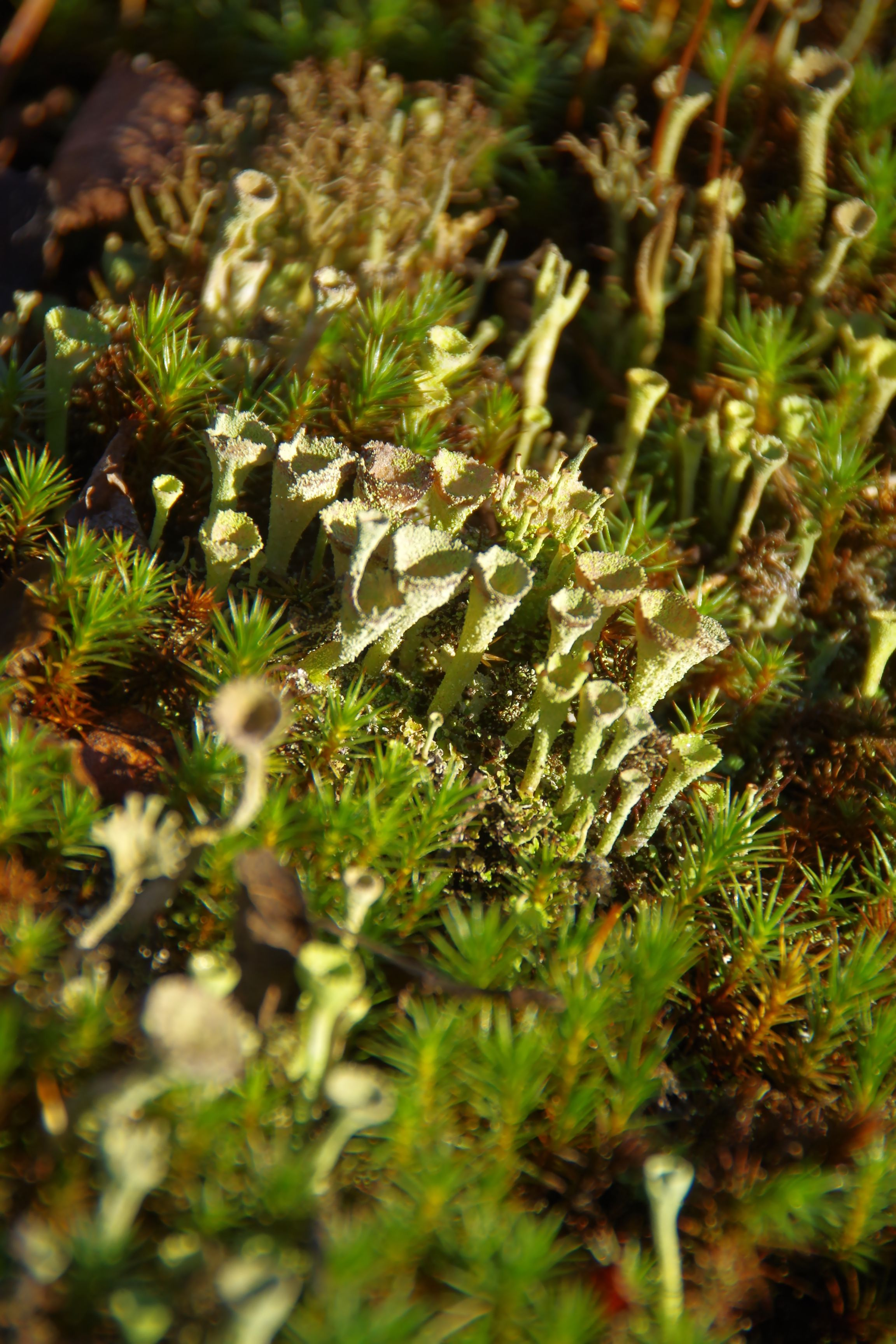

Conservation status
- Secure (NatureServe)

Scientific classification
- Kingdom: Fungi
- Division: Ascomycota
- Class: Lecanoromycetes
- Order: Lecanorales
- Family: Cladoniaceae
- Genus: Cladonia
- Species: C. carneola

Binomial name
- Cladonia carneola (Fr.) Fr. (1831)

Synonyms
- Cenomyce carneola Fr.

= Cladonia carneola =

Species of lichen

Cladonia carneola or the crowned cup lichen is a species of fruticose, cup lichen in the family Cladoniaceae. It was described as a new species by Swedish mycologist Elias Magnus Fries. Lichenicolous fungi that have been recorded growing on Cladonia carneola include Phaeopyxis punctum and Taeniolella beschiana.

In Nepal, Cladonia carneola has been reported from 3,900 to 4,100 m elevation in a compilation of published records.

== See also ==
- List of Cladonia species
