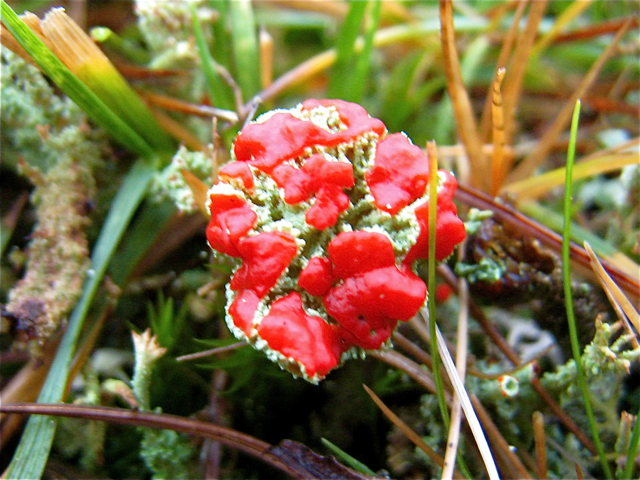

Conservation status
- Secure (NatureServe)

Scientific classification
- Kingdom: Fungi
- Division: Ascomycota
- Class: Lecanoromycetes
- Order: Lecanorales
- Family: Cladoniaceae
- Genus: Cladonia
- Species: C. bellidiflora

Binomial name
- Cladonia bellidiflora (Ach.) Schaer. (1823)

Synonyms
- Lichen bellidiflorus Ach. (1799); Baeomyces bellidiflorus (Ach.) Ach. (1803); Scyphophorus bellidiflorus (Ach.) Gray (1821)

= Cladonia bellidiflora =

Species of lichen

Cladonia bellidiflora or the toy soldiers cup lichen is a fruticose, cup lichen species in the Cladoniaceae family.

== See also ==
- List of Cladonia species
