= Cladonia flammea =

Scientific classification
- Kingdom: Fungi
- Division: Ascomycota
- Class: Lecanoromycetes
- Order: Lecanorales
- Family: Cladoniaceae
- Genus: Cladonia
- Species: C. flammea

Binomial name
- Cladonia flammea Øvstedal (2012)

Species of lichen

Cladonia flammea is a species of fruticose lichen in the family Lecanoraceae. Found on the Falkland Islands, it was described as a new species in 2012 by Dag Øvstedal. The type specimen was collected by Imshaug and Harris in 1968 from the valley west of Mount Usborne in the East Falklands, where it was found growing on Cortaderia heath and sandstone outcrops along a stream. Its species epithet, flammea, alludes to the reddish-orange colouration on the underside of the primary squamules.

== See also ==
- List of Cladonia species
