= Cladonia homosekikaica =

Scientific classification
- Domain: Eukaryota
- Kingdom: Fungi
- Division: Ascomycota
- Class: Lecanoromycetes
- Order: Lecanorales
- Family: Cladoniaceae
- Genus: Cladonia
- Species: C. homosekikaica

Binomial name
- Cladonia homosekikaica Nuno (1975)

Species of lichen

Cladonia homosekikaica is a species of cup lichen belonging to the family Cladoniaceae. It was formally described as a new species by Japanese lichenologist Mariko Nuno in 1975.

As of July 2021, its conservation status has not been estimated by the IUCN. In Iceland, its conservations status is data deficient (DD).

== See also ==
- List of Cladonia species
