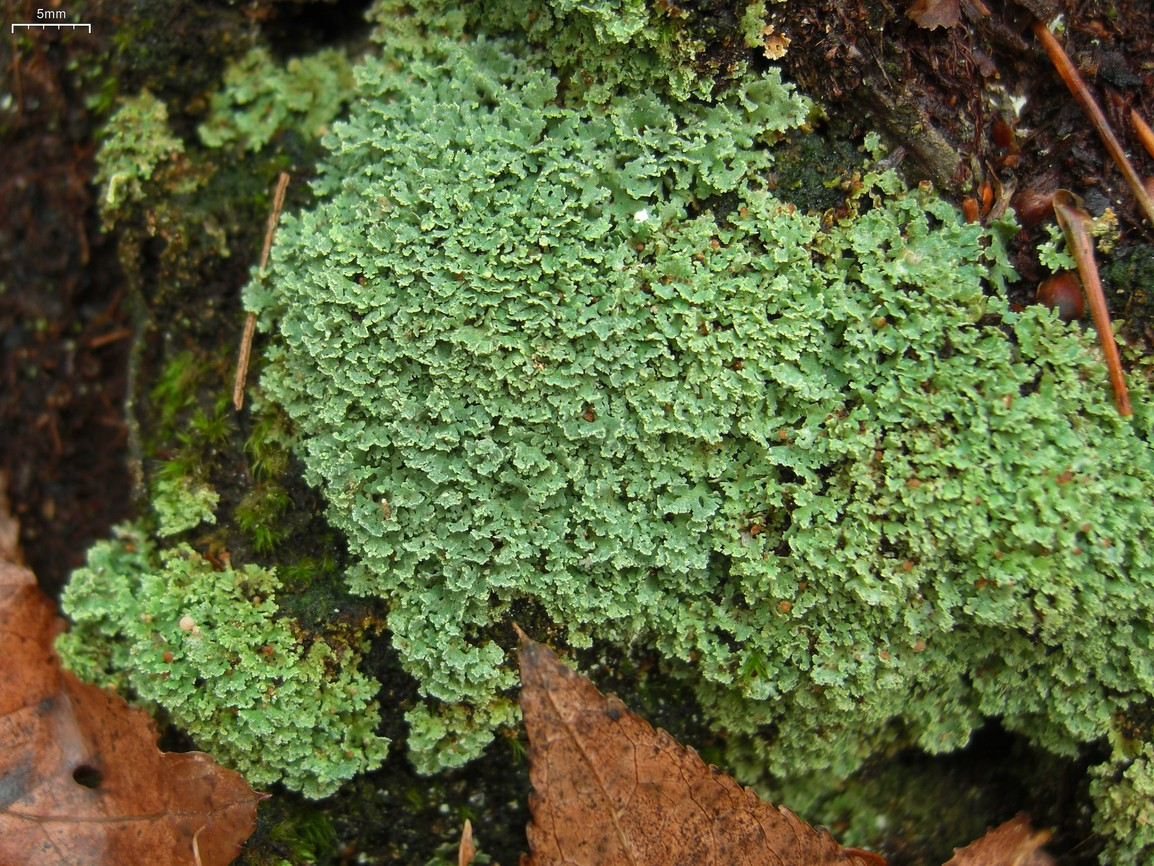
- in the Great Smoky Mountains, North Carolina

Conservation status
- Secure (NatureServe)

Scientific classification
- Kingdom: Fungi
- Division: Ascomycota
- Class: Lecanoromycetes
- Order: Lecanorales
- Family: Cladoniaceae
- Genus: Cladonia
- Species: C. caespiticia

Binomial name
- Cladonia caespiticia (Pers.) Flörke (1827)

Synonyms
- Baeomyces caespiticius Pers. (1794)

= Cladonia caespiticia =

Species of lichen

Cladonia caespiticia is a widespread and common species of fruticose, cup lichen in the family Cladoniaceae. It was originally named Baeomyces caespiticius by German mycologist Christiaan Hendrik Persoon in 1794. Heinrich Gustav Flörke transferred it to the genus Cladonia in 1827. In North America, it is commonly known as the stubby-stalked Cladonia.

== See also ==
- List of Cladonia species
