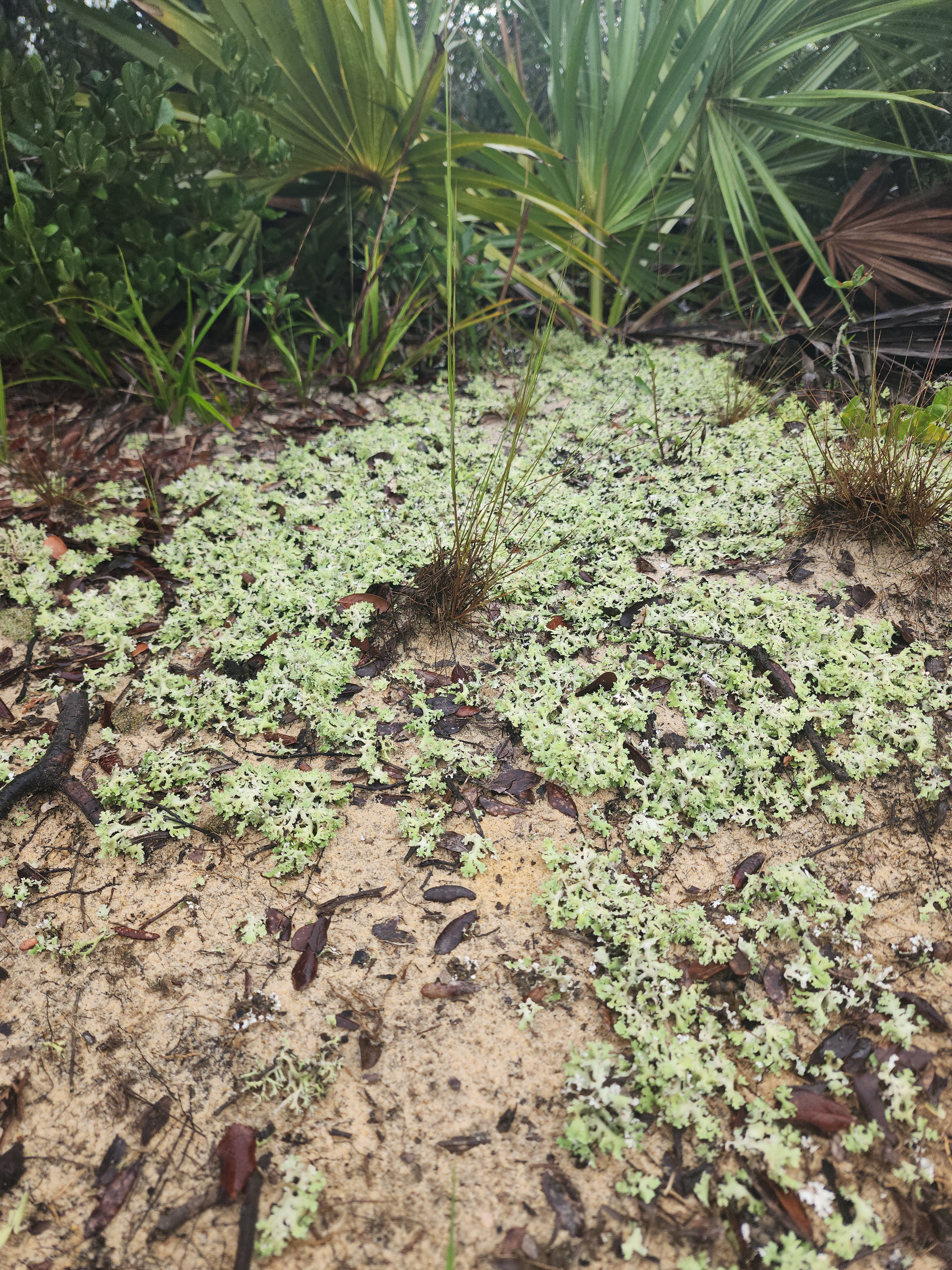
- Rehydrated form after recent rain

Conservation status
- Imperiled (NatureServe)

Scientific classification
- Kingdom: Fungi
- Division: Ascomycota
- Class: Lecanoromycetes
- Order: Lecanorales
- Family: Cladoniaceae
- Genus: Cladonia
- Species: C. prostrata

Binomial name
- Cladonia prostrata A.Evans (1952)

= Cladonia prostrata =

Species of lichen

Cladonia prostrata, commonly called dune cup lichen or resurrection lichen, is an endangered species of lichen endemic to the U.S. southeast coastal plain where it is known from populations in Florida, Georgia, and Alabama.

== Habitat ==
It occurs in the sandy soils of fire-dependent xeric relict dune habitats such as sandhill and scrub.

== Conservation ==
Due to its restricted habitat requirements and known distribution, it thought to be an endangered species across its range. In Georgia, it is known from only 3 populations (of which only 1 is protected) on ancient dunes of the Ohoopee River system. Otherwise, it may be found in greater abundance and continuity in Florida's panhandle and down the Lake Wales Ridge. It is under threat from habitat loss and fragmentation due to fire suppression and development of infrastructure and real estate.

== Gallery ==
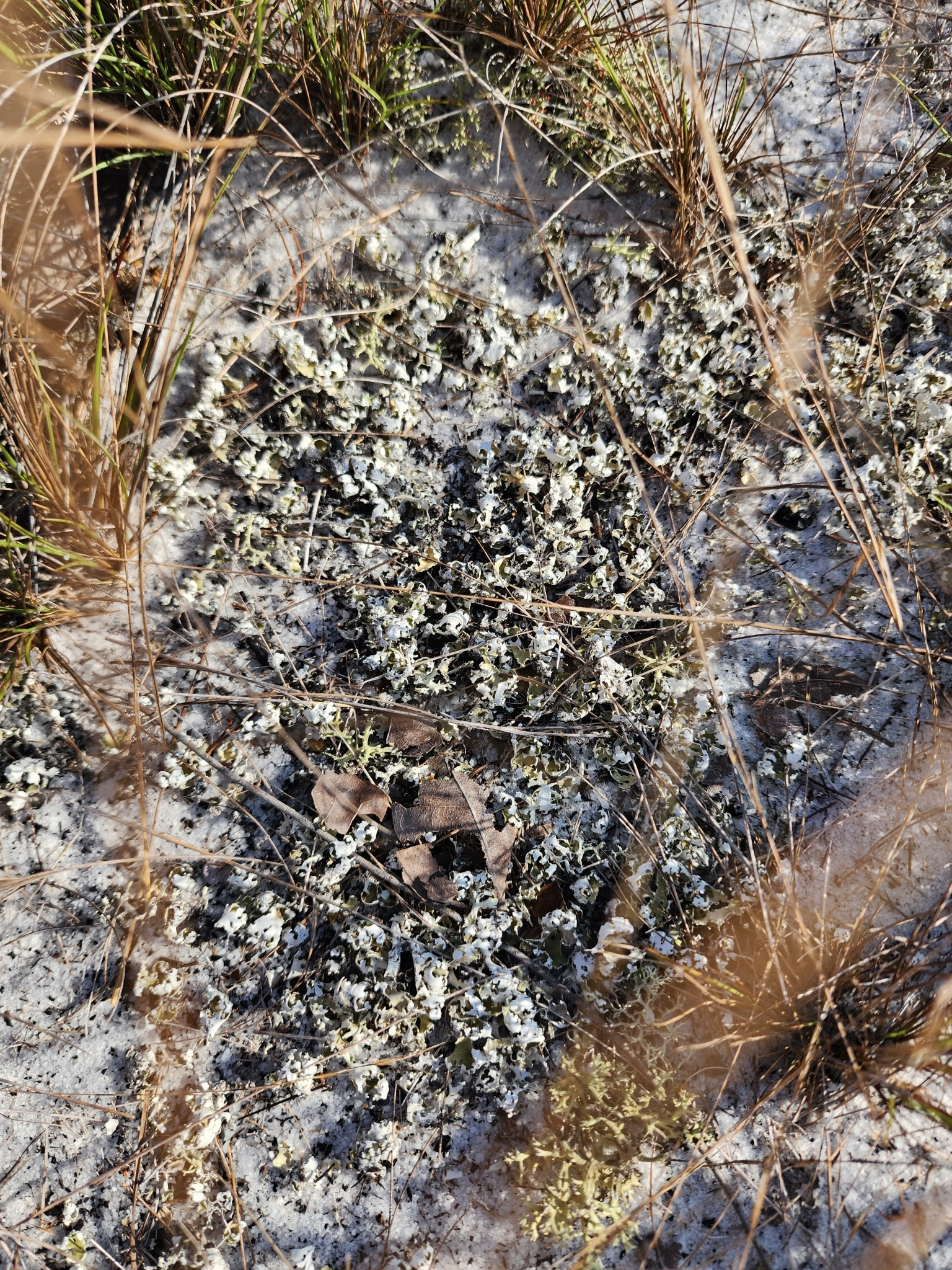
Desiccated form during a drought
