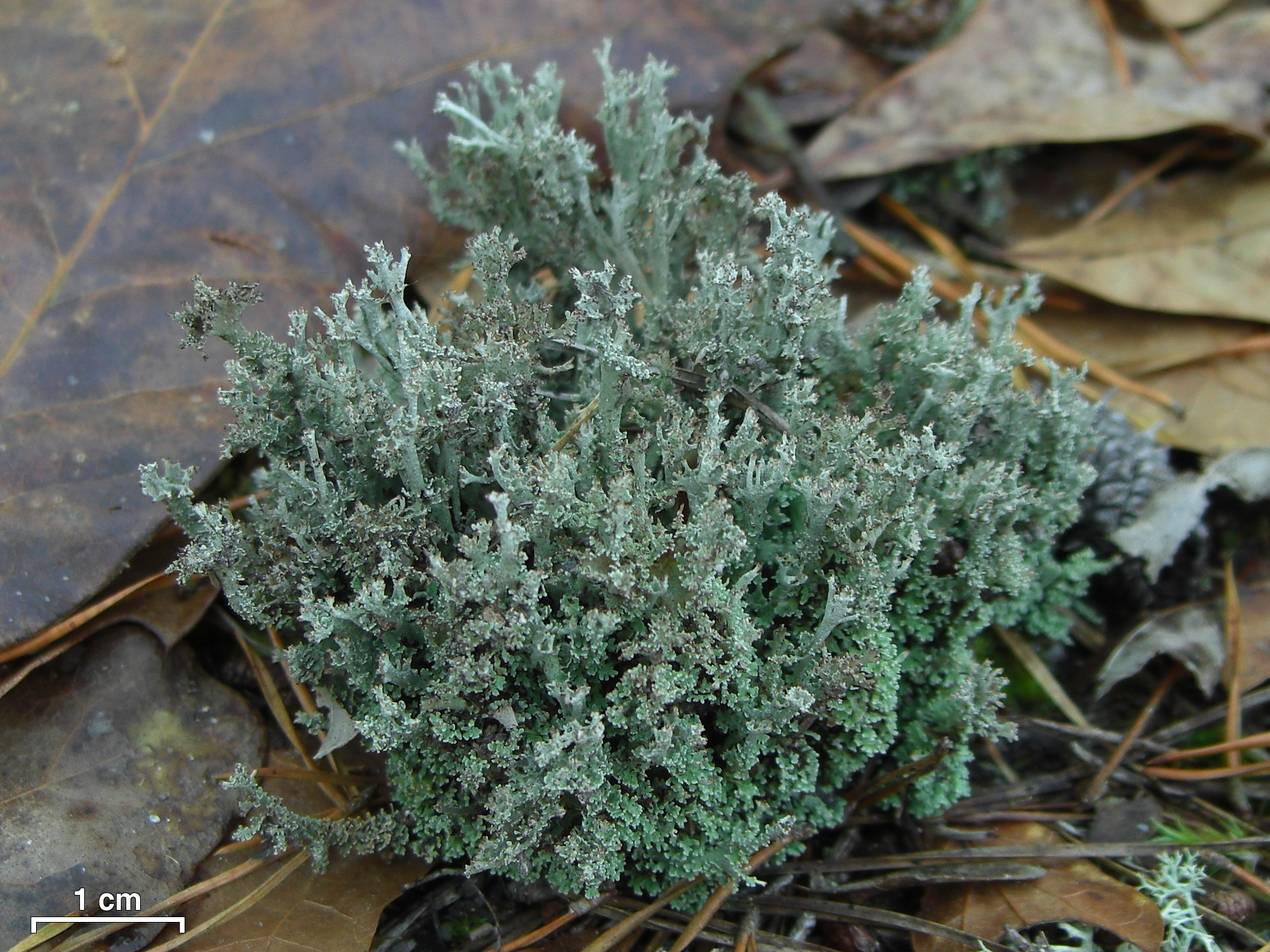

Conservation status
- Apparently Secure (NatureServe)

Scientific classification
- Kingdom: Fungi
- Division: Ascomycota
- Class: Lecanoromycetes
- Order: Lecanorales
- Family: Cladoniaceae
- Genus: Cladonia
- Species: C. atlantica

Binomial name
- Cladonia atlantica A.Evans (1944)

= Cladonia atlantica =

Species of fungus

Cladonia atlantica, also known as the Atlantic cup lichen, is a species of lichen in the family Cladoniaceae. It is found among the Atlantic Coast of the US, ranging from South Carolina to the Northeastern United States.

== Taxonomy ==
=== Name ===
The species name atlantica originates from the Atlantic Ocean, which is most likely due to the fact the species is found on the Atlantic Coast of the United States.

=== Subspecies ===
C. atlantica has 5 subspecies.

- Cladonia atlantica f. atlantica
- Cladonia atlantica f. microphylla A.Evans
- Cladonia atlantica f. ramosa A.Evans
- Cladonia atlantica f. ramosissima A.Evans
- Cladonia atlantica f. subsimplex A.Evans
