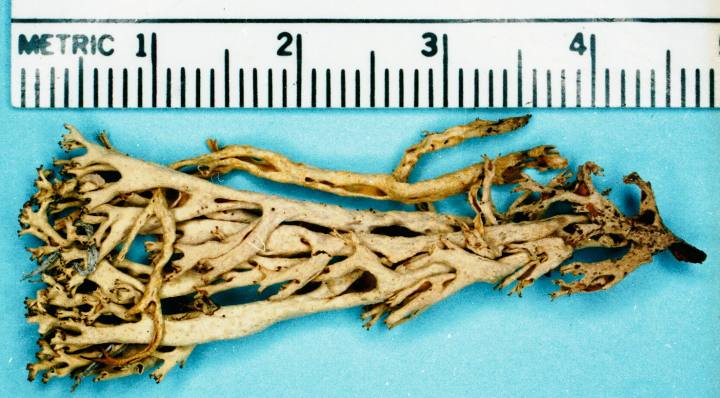

Conservation status
- Apparently Secure (NatureServe)

Scientific classification
- Kingdom: Fungi
- Division: Ascomycota
- Class: Lecanoromycetes
- Order: Lecanorales
- Family: Cladoniaceae
- Genus: Cladonia
- Species: C. alaskana

Binomial name
- Cladonia alaskana A.Evans, 1949

= Cladonia alaskana =

Species of fungus

Cladonia alaskana, commonly known as the Alaskan cup lichen, is a species of cup lichen in the Cladoniaceae family. It is found in and around the arctic circle, growing in acidic soils. 40-80 mm tall and up to 2 mm in diameter. This species grows over boulders in heath and tussock tundras.

== Description ==
The species lacks a known primary thallus. Podetia are 40–80 mm tall and up to 2 mm wide, forming dense tufts that regenerate from their tips while dying at the base. Branching is irregular, either dichotomous or in whorls of three to four, with branches ascending closely together. Axils may be open or closed. The surface is dull and appears somewhat arachnoid under magnification, pale gray with yellowish or brownish tints that darken with age. A continuous cartilaginous layer encircles the central canal and forms irregular internal bulges. Algal clusters occur near the outer edge of the medulla in a discontinuous layer beneath the cortex. Small, undivided or weakly lobed squamules, up to 1 mm long, are sometimes present on the podetia.

Branches bearing apothecia are broader and split irregularly at the tips, producing apical perforations but no true cups. Apothecia are 1–2 mm in diameter, pale to dark brown, and cluster around the perforations. Pycnidia are located at podetial apices.

Spot tests show K+ (vaguely yellow to gray), KC+ (yellow), and P+ (red) reactions. Usnic acid and fumarprotocetraric acid are present, along with accessory ursolic acid.

== Habitat ==
Cladonia alaskana occurs in arctic and subarctic regions, particularly around the Arctic Circle, including areas like Alaska and Spitsbergen. It grows on acidic soils, often over boulders, in heath and tussock tundras. The species forms dense tufts in exposed, cold environments, typically on well-drained substrates in open, treeless landscapes.
