= Cladonia acervata =

Scientific classification
- Domain: Eukaryota
- Kingdom: Fungi
- Division: Ascomycota
- Class: Lecanoromycetes
- Order: Lecanorales
- Family: Cladoniaceae
- Genus: Cladonia
- Species: C. acervata

Binomial name
- Cladonia acervata S.Hammer (2001)

Species of lichen

Cladonia acervata is a species of cup lichen in the family Cladoniaceae. It has been found in Australia and New Zealand.
