= Cladonia albofuscescens =

Scientific classification
- Domain: Eukaryota
- Kingdom: Fungi
- Division: Ascomycota
- Class: Lecanoromycetes
- Order: Lecanorales
- Family: Cladoniaceae
- Genus: Cladonia
- Species: C. albofuscescens

Binomial name
- Cladonia albofuscescens Vain. (1887)

Species of cup lichen

Cladonia albofuscescens is a species of cup lichen in the family Cladoniaceae. It is found in South America, and grows in tropical moist broadleaf forests.
