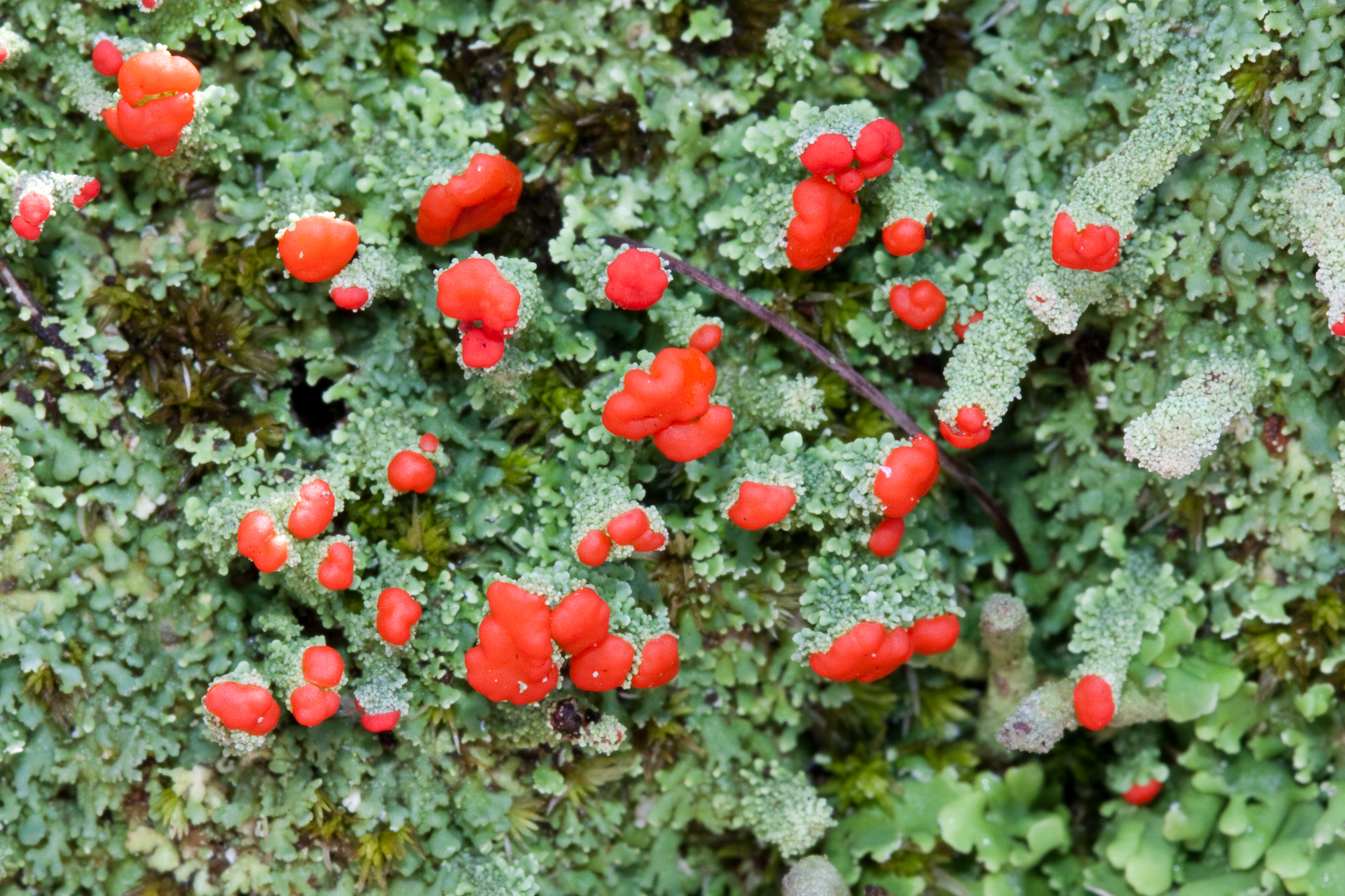

Conservation status
- Secure (NatureServe)

Scientific classification
- Kingdom: Fungi
- Division: Ascomycota
- Class: Lecanoromycetes
- Order: Lecanorales
- Family: Cladoniaceae
- Genus: Cladonia
- Species: C. didyma

Binomial name
- Cladonia didyma (Fée) Vain (1887)

= Cladonia didyma =

Species of lichen

Cladonia didyma is a fruticose lichen, commonly known as southern soldiers, belonging to the family Cladoniaceae, which include fungal symbionts under the Ascomycota phylum with characteristic red ascocarps containing sexually reproductive asci.

Initially named Scyphophorus didymus (Fée 1824), it was later reclassified into Cladonia didyma in 1887. Its namesake is described as deriving from the ancient Greek κλᾰ́δος (kládos) meaning 'branching' and Δίδυμος (didymus) describing 'bunched', 'clustered' or 'paired' indicative of the branched like structures characteristic of the Cladonia genus and the often observed clusters of C. didyma found among various other Cladonia spp. or other C. didyma variants.

== Physiology ==
Species in the Cladonia genus have distinct, easily identifiable characteristics. However, species identification generally requires assessment of their chemical and metabolic properties due to high morphological similarity among species, and wide occurrence of environmentally contextual within species variations.

The upper surface of the primary thallus has a smooth, green to gray cortex with a slight sheen. The structure includes concealed squamules 0.7–2.0 mm long and 0.5–1.5 mm wide which can be either lobed or laciniate and lack soredia. Conversely the bottom surface lacks a cortex and is white and flat.

The podetia (secondary thallus) is branched, and ranges from white to gray, 0.5 –2.4 cm tall, outer diameter of 0.5–1.5 mm. Its surface is granulose with squamulose features around the base and lacks soredia. Variation of micro physiological features include presence or absence of a medulla or cortex, and surface textures that can be grooved, smooth, or velvety. When a medulla is present, its sterome is 100–142 μm thick and is brown or gray in color.

The apex of the podetia contains either a single or clustered grouping of convex, margin-less apothecia ranging from 2.5 - 0.3 mm wide. The color ranges from orange to scarlet red and changes to blue in response to iodine. Ascospores can be either fusiform or oblong.

== Secondary metabolites ==
Barbatic, thamnolic, and didymic acids are among the most common metabolites produced by C. didyma. Other known compounds that have been observed include condidymic, subdidymic, and decarboxythamnolic acids, while others have yet to be characterized. Among the many phenotypes of C. didyma, two major chemotypes have been defined by the presence of either didymic or thamnolic acid and are observed within different habitat types.

Analysis of C. didyma metabolites has found antioxidant compounds as well as others within chemical families associated with defense responses related to oxidative stress and UV exposure. Experimental tests on these compounds revealed their potential uses in sun protection and regulation of free radicals.

== Habitat and distribution ==
Cladonia didyma has a wide distribution and can be found on nearly every continent and oceanic region under various environmental conditions, at sea level and altitudes as high as 3400 meters, and habitats ranging from mesic to xeric forests. Often found growing on dying or decaying trees among other mosses and lichens, but has also been observed to persist within sandy soils or growing on rocks, and has been found in mycorrhizal sequencing analysis of epiphytic orchids.
