= Cladonia aleuropoda =

Scientific classification
- Domain: Eukaryota
- Kingdom: Fungi
- Division: Ascomycota
- Class: Lecanoromycetes
- Order: Lecanorales
- Family: Cladoniaceae
- Genus: Cladonia
- Species: C. aleuropoda

Binomial name
- Cladonia aleuropoda Vain. (1899)

Species of lichen

Cladonia aleuropoda is a species of cup lichen in the family Cladoniaceae. It has been found in both South America and Central America, as well as a single instance in Mexico. Its substrates include rocks and soil.
