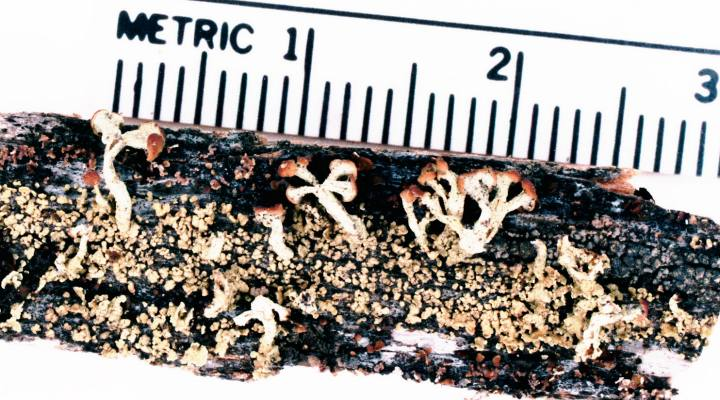

Conservation status
- Secure (NatureServe)

Scientific classification
- Kingdom: Fungi
- Division: Ascomycota
- Class: Lecanoromycetes
- Order: Lecanorales
- Family: Cladoniaceae
- Genus: Cladonia
- Species: C. botrytes

Binomial name
- Cladonia botrytes (K.G. Hagen) Willd.

Synonyms
- Lichen botrytes K.G. Hagen

= Cladonia botrytes =

Species of fungus

Cladonia botrytes or the wooden soldiers cup lichen is a species of cup lichen in the family Cladoniaceae. Its habitat includes secondary xylem.
