= Awarua Wetland =

New Zealand protected area

- The Awarua Wetland is on the southern coast of the South Island.
- Location: Southland Region of New Zealand
- Coordinates: 46.563109°S 168.595505°E
- Area: 20,000 hectares (49,000 acres)

Ramsar Wetland
- Designated: 13 August 1976
- Reference no.: 102

The Awarua Wetland is a peatland area of 20,000 hectares (49,000 acres) in the Southland Region of New Zealand. The site, which was initially an area of about 3,556 hectares (8,790 acres), was designated as having international significance under the Ramsar Convention in 1976, using the name Waituna Wetlands Scientific Reserve.

Conservation Minister Steve Chadwick unveiled a plaque at New River Estuary on 4 May 2008. This wetland is unique in New Zealand as it includes privately owned ground (Gamble, Nicol, and Rance families).

On the northeast corner of the Toetoes Wetlands is an area of native bush of approximately 25 hectares (62 acres), which along with other areas of bush close by was covenanted to the QEII Trust by the Nicol Family. While not a true wetland it is an area of natural vegetation with an unmodified stream flowing from the wetlands through native brush and into the Mataura river. It is a small sanctuary for the declining native fresh water fish population.

Intensive farming in the catchment for the wetland has raised fears that the Waituna Lagoon, which is a part of the wetland, may soon begin to suffer from eutrophication.

== See also ==
- Wetlands of New Zealand
- Washdyke Lagoon
