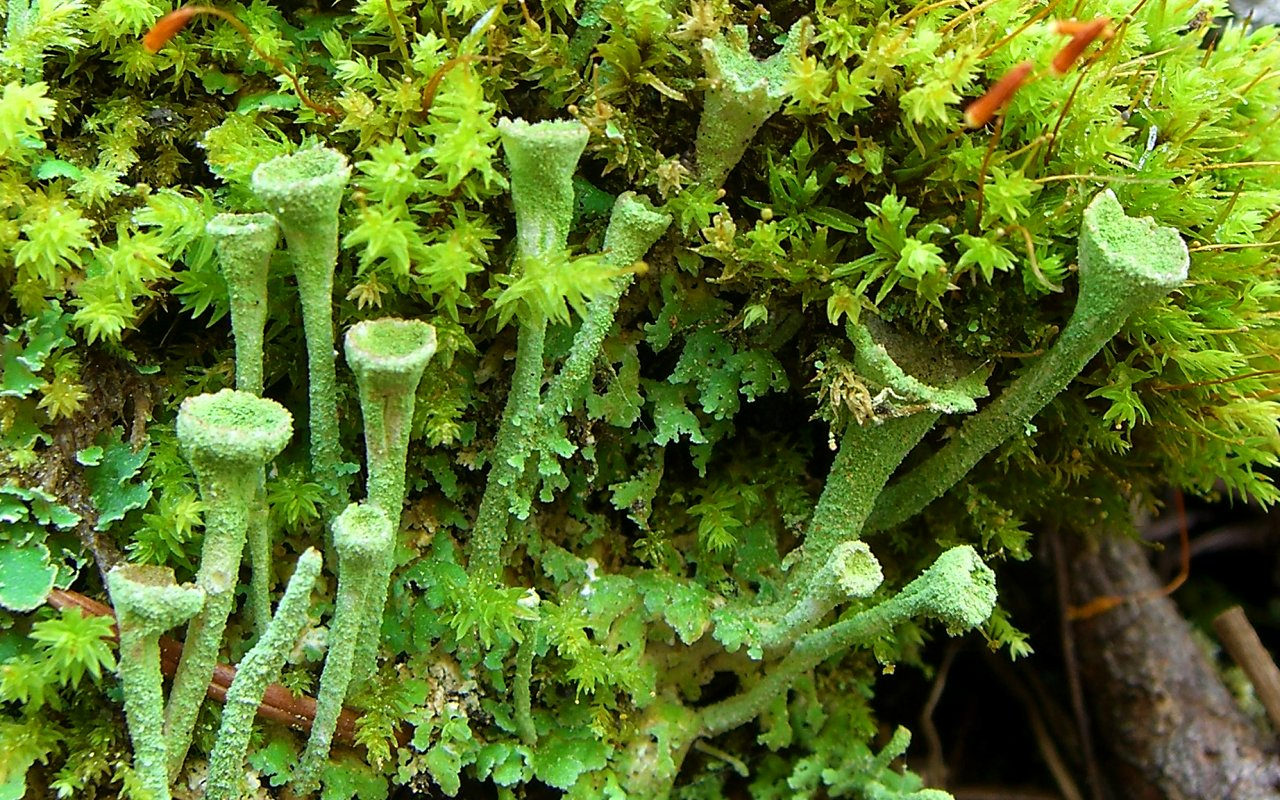

Conservation status
- Apparently Secure (NatureServe)

Scientific classification
- Kingdom: Fungi
- Division: Ascomycota
- Class: Lecanoromycetes
- Order: Lecanorales
- Family: Cladoniaceae
- Genus: Cladonia
- Species: C. asahinae

Binomial name
- Cladonia asahinae J.W.Thomson (1967)

= Cladonia asahinae =

Species of lichen

Cladonia asahinae, the pixie cup lichen or Asahina's cup lichen, is a species of cup lichen in the family Cladoniaceae. C. asahinae occurs in Europe, North America, southern South America, and the Antarctic. It typically grows in high moisture environments in soil rich in humus or on dead wood.

== Taxonomy ==
The species was first named and formally described by John Walter Thomson in 1969. The species epithet asahinae honors the Japanese chemist and lichenologist Yasuhiko Asahina, a significant contributor to the study of the chemotaxonomy of genus Cladonia. Cladonia asahinae is a member of the Cladonia chlorophaea species complex. In North America, one vernacular name used for the species is "pixie-cup lichen".

== Description ==
Cladonia asahinae is characterized by its dwarf-fruticose growth form, with primary squamules measuring 1–2 mm in breadth, showing an olive green coloration on the top and a white to blackening hue below. The species can be either sorediate or esorediate. Its green-grey podetia are cup-forming, around 0.8–1.0 cm in height, and have a gradual flaring in the upper half. Unlike the squat appearance of C. chlorophaea, this species resembles C. fimbriata in shape. The base of the stalk is corticate, with squamules and schizidia being common, while the upper part mixes coarse soredia and schizidia, eventually becoming decorticate and dull, ranging in color from white to brown. The granules and/or soredia were regularly cast off, exposing the white medulla underneath. Apothecia are seen on short stipes emerging from the cup margins, typically brown in color.

== Chemical classification ==
The chemistry of Cladonia asahinae is a key character in identification as there are an estimated 400 species in the genus Cladonia, many of which appear morphologically similar. Other lichens that are commonly found with C. asahinae include Cladonia deformis, C. cornuta, C. furcata, and C. macilenta and C. grayi. There are two chemical variants of Cladonia asahinae which exhibit distinct fatty acid compositions. One variant is characterized by the presence of lichesterinic acid and/or protolichesterinic acid, while the other variant contains rangiformic acid and/or norrangiformic acid. In both variants fumarprotocetraric acid is present and fatty acids are made as a secondary metabolite. The two variants were noted as a chemical analysis study conducted by two Norwegian botanists at the University of Bergen resulted in the species testing positive for rangiformic, and norrangiformic, and fumarprotocetraric acid. Whereas, a study done by conducted by the University of Wisconsin noted the protolichesterinic acid present in Cladonia asahinae. This study also conducted chemical spot tests, resulting in K−, C−, and P+ appearing red.

== Habitat ==
Cladonia asahinae prefers humid climates and is often located near oceanic ecosystems. In addition to high moisture, other habitat requirements include minimal soil erosion, presence of shade, presence of fog-drip, and soil rich in organic matter. The species appears to prefer environments rich in humus, such as soil, rocks, old logs, and tree bases. However, the most common organic substratum for Cladonia asahinae identified by survey conducted by the US forest service was dead twigs. The range of substrate tolerance was estimated to be 3-4 out of 5.

== Distribution ==
In North America, Cladonia asahinae has a Pacific Coastal distribution pattern, with occurrences ranging from Alaska through southern British Columbia to Washington State, with Idaho being the only inland state in which it has been observed. Outside of North America, Cladonia asahinae is widely distributed in Europe, and has been found in South America (Argentina and Chile), as well as in Russia and the Antarctic.

== See also ==
- List of Cladonia species
