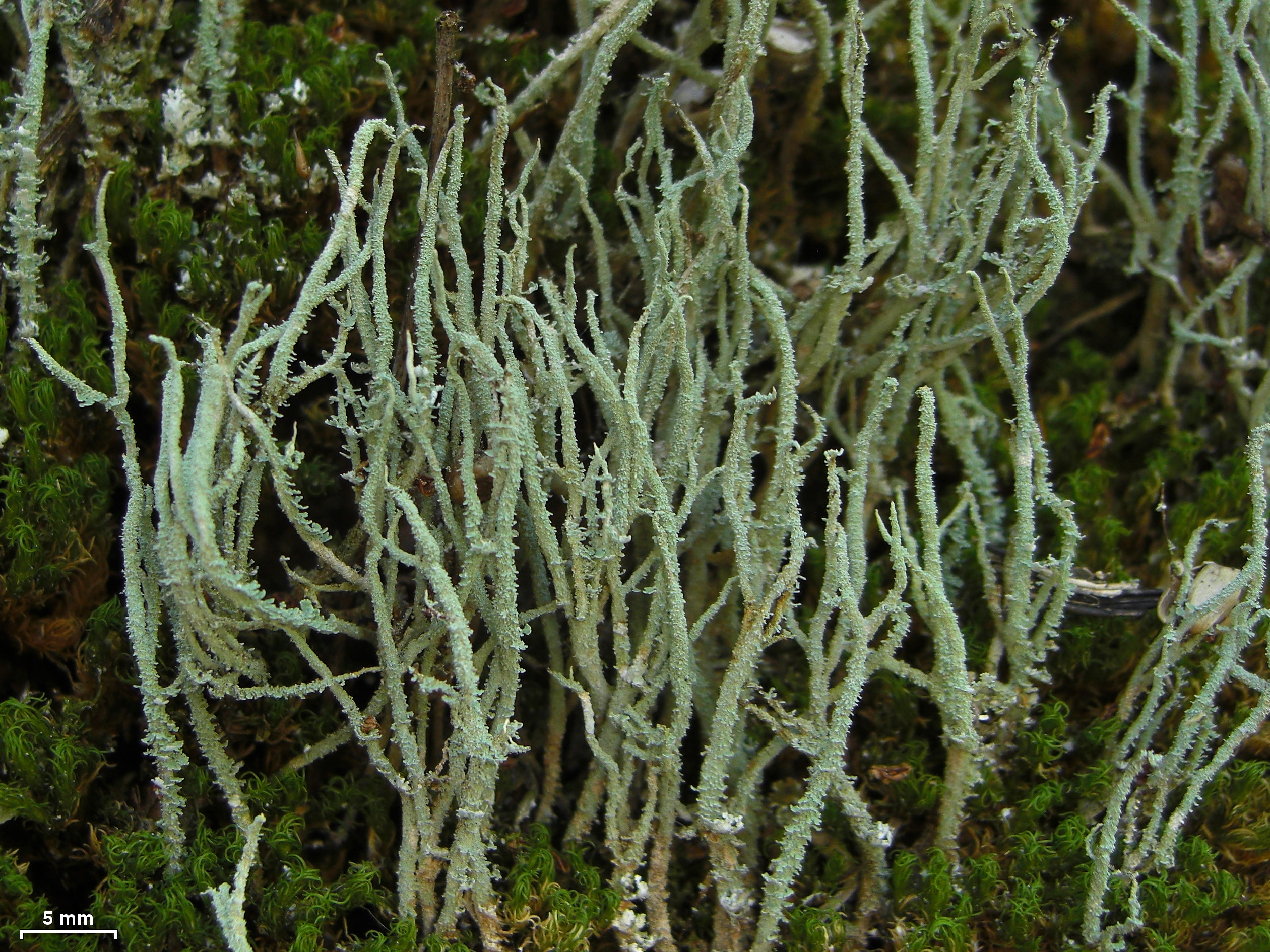

Conservation status
- Apparently Secure (NatureServe)

Scientific classification
- Kingdom: Fungi
- Division: Ascomycota
- Class: Lecanoromycetes
- Order: Lecanorales
- Family: Cladoniaceae
- Genus: Cladonia
- Species: C. subradiata

Binomial name
- Cladonia subradiata (Vain.) Sandst. (1922)

Synonyms
- Cladonia balfourii Cromb. (1876); Cladonia fimbriata var. subradiata Vain. (1894); Cladonia fimbriata var. balfourii (Cromb.) Vain. (1894)

= Cladonia subradiata =

Species of lichen

Cladonia subradiata is a widely distributed species of fruticose lichen in the family Cladoniaceae. It is found in Asia, Africa, Melanesia, Australia, New Zealand, and South, Central, and North America.

== Taxonomy ==
The lichen was originally described as a variety of Cladonia fimbriata by Finnish lichenologist Edvard August Vainio in 1894. The type specimen, collected in 1885, was found in Minas Gerais, Brazil, in the Caraça Mountains, at an elevation of 1,400 m (4,600 ft). German botanist Heinrich Sandstede promoted it to distinct species status in 1922.

== Description ==
Cladonia subradiata has a scaly primary thallus that is small and stands erect. The podetia are whitish, measuring 1–2 cm (0.4–0.8 in) long, abundantly brown, rarely branched, acute or forming, tiny cups, with small scales, especially at the base. Apothecia are scarce; when present, they are reddish or brown, and spherical. In terms of lichen spot tests, Cladonia subradiata is PD+ red and K−. It contains the lichen substances protocetraric acid, fumarprotocetraric acid, ursolic acid, and the chemically uncharacterized compounds called Cph-1 and Cph-2.

Cladonia subradiata has been confused with Cladonia balfourii; these species can be separated by chemistry. According to Index Fungorum, however, these species are synonymous.

== Habitat and distribution ==
This species is widely distributed in Central and South America, extending to North Carolina in North America. In South America the lichen has been collected from Brazil, Chile, Argentina, Paraguay, and Guyana. It has also been recorded from Asia, Africa, Papua New Guinea, New Caledonia, Australia, and New Zealand. Cladonia subradiata grows in primary montane rainforests, preferring substrates such as humus and boulders.

== See also ==
- List of Cladonia species
