= Cladonia flavocrispata =

Scientific classification
- Domain: Eukaryota
- Kingdom: Fungi
- Division: Ascomycota
- Class: Lecanoromycetes
- Order: Lecanorales
- Family: Cladoniaceae
- Genus: Cladonia
- Species: C. flavocrispata

Binomial name
- Cladonia flavocrispata Ahti & Sipman (2013)

Species of lichen

Cladonia flavocrispata is a species of fruticose lichen in the family Cladoniaceae. Found in Venezuela and described as a new species in 2013, it is closely related to Cladonia hians, but is distinguished by its unique chemical composition and morphology.

== Taxonomy ==
Described by the lichenologists Teuvo Ahti and Harrie Sipman in 2013, Cladonia flavocrispata was first collected in Venezuela in 1990, within a rocky sandstone area featuring scrub on an exposed ridge at the Cerro Guaiquinima. This species is characterised by its pale green, evanescent primary thallus, and podetia that are pale greenish grey, forming dense, erect cushions.

== Description ==
The primary thallus of Cladonia flavocrispata is evanescent and pale green, appearing as scattered, small squamules in the lower part of the podetia, measuring roughly 0.2–0.5 by 1 mm. These squamules are simple or slightly split into irregularly crenulate laciniae, without soredia. Podetia can reach 5–12 cm in height, displaying indeterminate growth and a pale greenish-grey colouration. The lower parts are strongly variegated with pale greenish grey and brown to black patches. The podetia typically form dense, erect cushions with main stems about 1.0–1.5 mm wide. The surface of the podetia is matt and discontinuously very thinly corticate, revealing most of the stereome with age. Chemical analysis reveals the presence of thamnolic and usnic acids, occasionally accompanied by barbatic acid, with colour reactions of P+ (yellow), K+ (yellow), and KC+ (yellow).

== Distribution and ecology ==
Cladonia flavocrispata is endemic to the Guiana Highlands, primarily found in Venezuela. It occupies humid sandstone tablelands, growing on sandstone flats with open bog vegetation at elevations ranging from 400 to 2,500 m (1,300 to 8,200 ft). While there are three uncertain collections from the Guianas, specifically from the sandstone plateau of the Kaieteur Falls, these may differ slightly in morphological characteristics.

== Similar species ==
While Cladonia flavocrispata shares similarities with Cladonia hians, it can be distinguished by its larger size and the presence of usnic acid. It may also resemble C. vareschii, which has a more intense yellow colour and somewhat thicker cortex. However, the presence of squamules, although often scarce, differentiates C. flavocrispata from these species.

== See also ==
- List of Cladonia species
