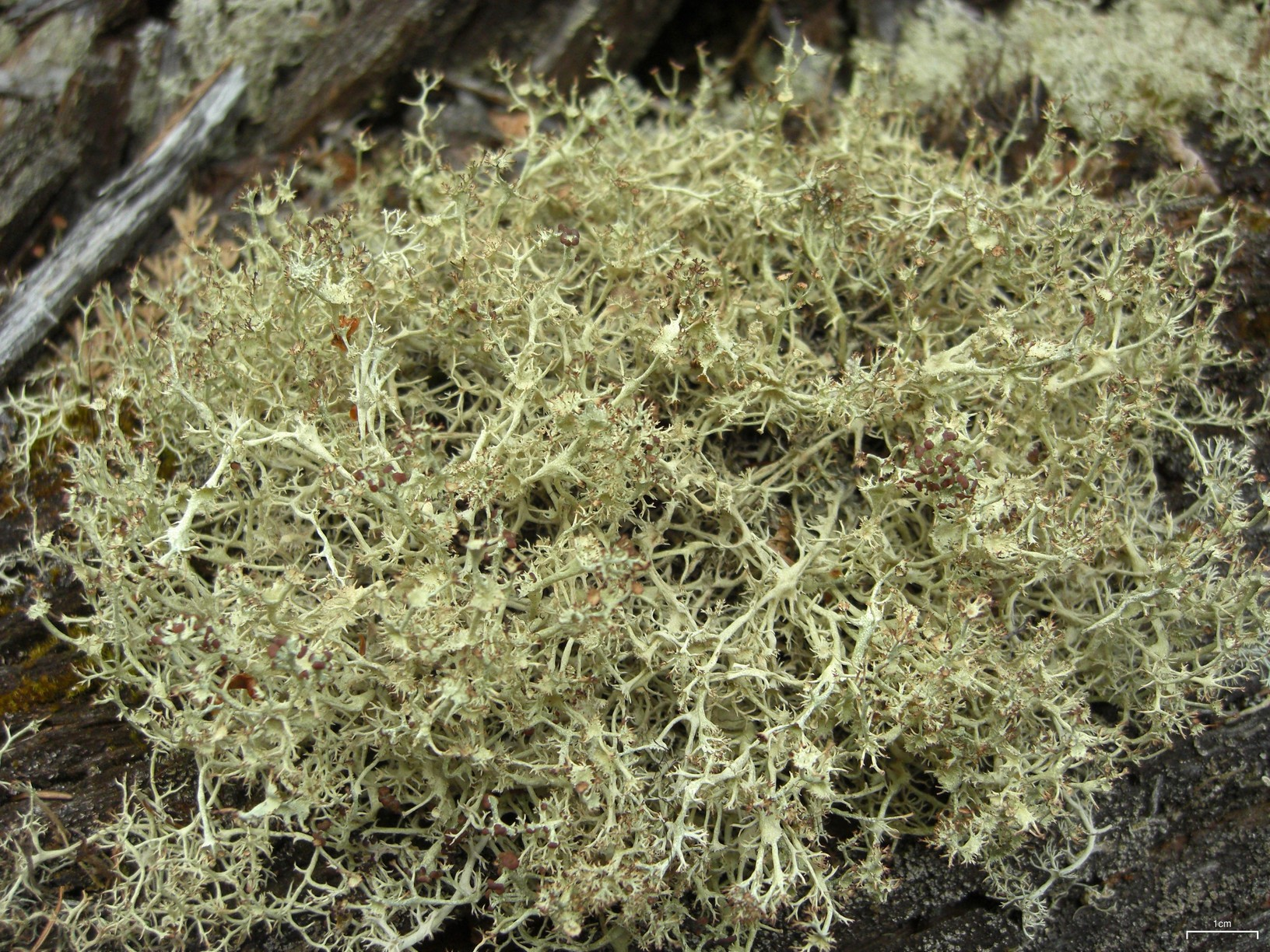
- in Wells Gary region, British Columbia

Conservation status
- Secure (NatureServe)

Scientific classification
- Kingdom: Fungi
- Division: Ascomycota
- Class: Lecanoromycetes
- Order: Lecanorales
- Family: Cladoniaceae
- Genus: Cladonia
- Species: C. amaurocraea

Binomial name
- Cladonia amaurocraea (Flörke) Schaer. (1887)

Synonyms
- Capitularia amaurocraea Flörke (1810); Cladina amaurocraea (Flörke) H.Olivier (1897)

= Cladonia amaurocraea =

Species of lichen-forming fungus

Cladonia amaurocraea, commonly known as the quill lichen or the quill cup lichen, is a species of fruticose, cup lichen in the family Cladoniaceae.

== Taxonomy ==
The lichen was first described scientifically as Capitularia amaurocraea in 1810. It was transferred to the genus Cladonia in 1887. It is commonly known as quill lichen.

== Description ==
The thallus of Cladonia amaurocraea comprises tall (15–100 mm high) and slender podetia that are irregularly or dichotomously branched. These podetia have a smooth, yellowish-green surface that is often mottled with patches of green and white. They either form a pointy tip, or a narrow cup that is either closed or has a narrow opening. The cortex contains usnic acid, while the medulla has barbatic acid.

== Habitat and distribution ==
Cladonia amaurocraea is found in boreal forests, where it typically grows on talus deposits between boulders and on rocky ground. In North America, it is widespread throughout Canada and Alaska.

== See also ==
- List of Cladonia species
