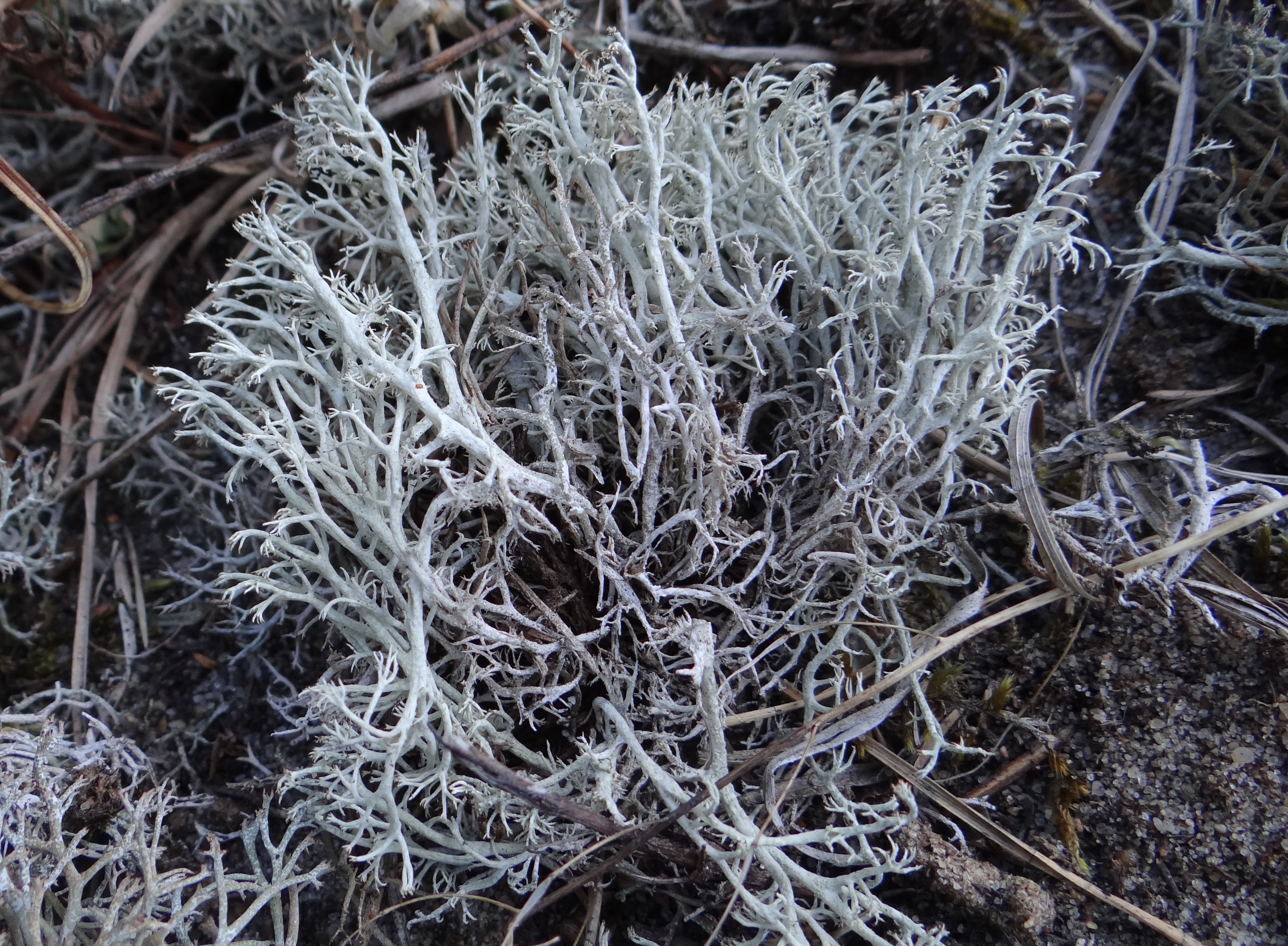

Scientific classification
- Domain: Eukaryota
- Kingdom: Fungi
- Division: Ascomycota
- Class: Lecanoromycetes
- Order: Lecanorales
- Family: Cladoniaceae
- Genus: Cladonia
- Species: C. mitis

Binomial name
- Cladonia mitis Sandst. (1918)

Synonyms
- Cladina arbuscula subsp. mitis (Sandst.) Burgaz (1994); Cladina mitis (Sandst.) Mong. (1938); Cladonia arbuscula subsp. mitis (Sandst.) Ruoss (1987); Cladonia arbuscula subsp. stictica Ruoss (1989); Cladonia arbuscula var. mitis (Sandst.) Sipman; Cladonia sylvatica var. mitis (Sandst.) Kušan (1932)

= Cladonia mitis =

Species of lichen

Cladonia mitis is a species of fruticose lichen in the family Cladoniaceae. It was formally described as a new species in 1918 by German lichenologist Heinrich Sandstede. It has previously been classified in genus Cladina before molecular phylogenetic studies showed this to be a part of Cladonia. Cladonia mitis is morphologically quite similar to Cladonia arbuscula, and some authors have considered it to be a variety or subspecies of the latter. They differ mainly in the production of secondary compounds: Cladonia mitis produces chemicals in the rangiformic acid complex, which C. arbuscula does not.

== See also ==
- List of Cladonia species
