= British Soldier =

British Soldier may refer to:

- A member of the British Armed Forces, particularly the British Army
- The lichen Cladonia cristatella, a type of cup lichen commonly known as "British Soldiers"
