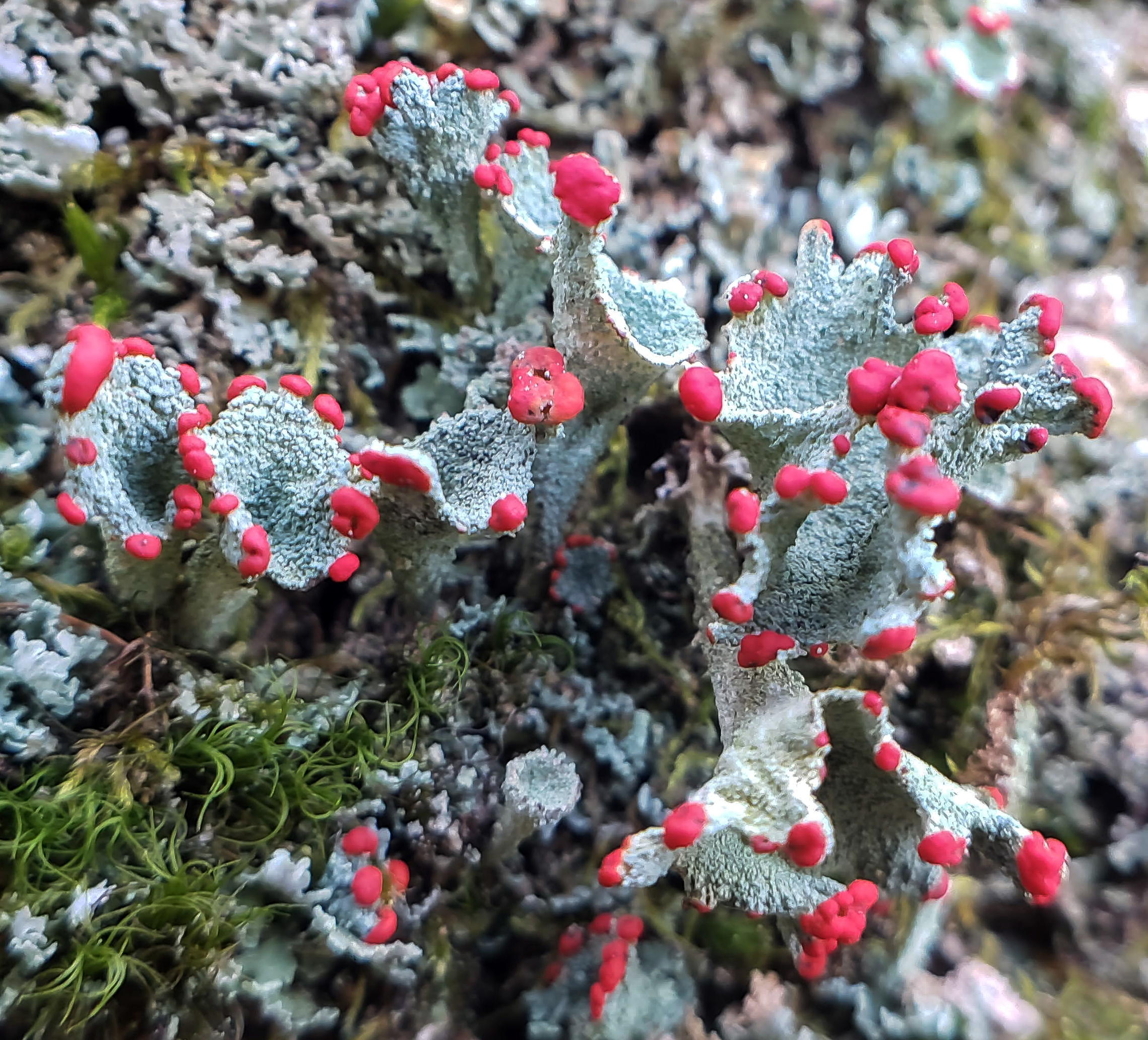

Conservation status
- Secure (NatureServe)

Scientific classification
- Kingdom: Fungi
- Division: Ascomycota
- Class: Lecanoromycetes
- Order: Lecanorales
- Family: Cladoniaceae
- Genus: Cladonia
- Species: C. borealis

Binomial name
- Cladonia borealis S.Stenroos (1989)

= Cladonia borealis =

Species of lichen

Cladonia borealis, commonly known as the boreal cup lichen, is a species of lichen in the genus Cladonia.

== Description ==
Cladonia borealis is yellowish green to brown in color. It occurs in North and South America, Antarctica, Eurasia and many on islands. The ascoma, when present is apothecial.

== Biochemistry ==
Its secondary metabolites include 4-O-demethylbarbatic acid, barbatic acid, rhodocladonic acid and usnic acid.

== See also ==
- List of Cladonia species
