= Xanthoparmelia karolinensis =

Scientific classification
- Kingdom: Fungi
- Division: Ascomycota
- Class: Lecanoromycetes
- Order: Lecanorales
- Family: Parmeliaceae
- Genus: Xanthoparmelia
- Species: X. karolinensis

Binomial name
- Xanthoparmelia karolinensis Elix (2006)
- Holotype: Karolin Rock, Western Australia

Species of lichen

Xanthoparmelia karolinensis is a little-known species of saxicolous (rock-dwelling) foliose lichen in the family Parmeliaceae, described as new to science in 2006.

== Taxonomy ==
Xanthoparmelia karolinensis was first described by John Elix in 2006, from specimens he collected on 29 April, 2004. The specific epithet, karolinensis, refers to Karolin Rock, the type locality in Western Australia, indicating the origin of the species.

== Description ==
The thallus of Xanthoparmelia karolinensis is foliose (leafy), adnate to tightly adnate, growing up to 3 cm wide. The lobes are contiguous to sparingly imbricate (overlapping), somewhat linear to irregular in shape, irregularly branched, 1–2 mm wide, and have somewhat rotund tips. The upper surface is yellow-green, darkening with age, emaculate (lacking spots), shiny and black-margined at the tips but becomes dull, rugulose (wrinkled), and areolate in the centre. The lichen lacks soredia and features dense, more or less spherical then cylindrical and coralloid-branched isidia. The medulla is white, and the lower surface is smooth, ivory to pale brown with sparse, simple, slender rhizines up to 1.0 mm long. Apothecia and pycnidia (sexual and asexual fruiting bodies, respectively) have not been observed in X. karolinensis.

== Habitat and distribution ==
At the time of its original publication, Xanthoparmelia karolinensis was known only from its type locality at Karolin Rock, 20 km northwest of Bullfinch in Western Australia. It grows on granite monoliths within remnant Eucalyptus, Casuarina, and Acacia vegetation.

Chemical analysis reveals the presence of usnic acid (minor), barbatic acid (major), 4-O-demethylbarbatic acid (minor), and norstictic acid (minor) in the cortex and medulla. The cortex reacts K−; the medulla reacts K+ (yellow then pale red), KC+ (yellow then red), C−, and P+ (yellow).

== See also ==
- List of Xanthoparmelia species
