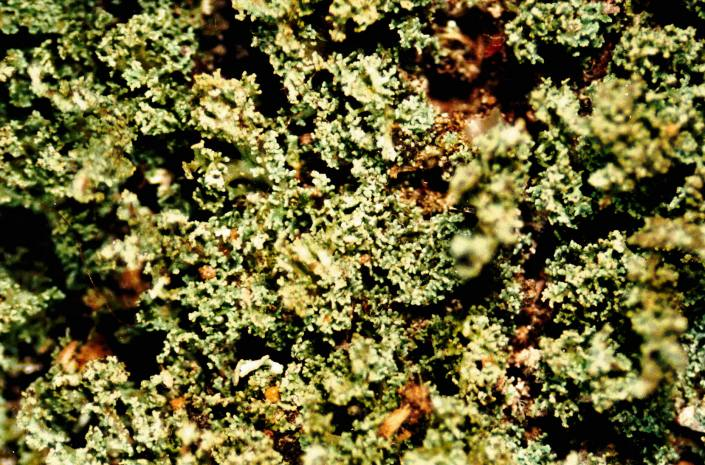
- Cladonia parasitica

Conservation status
- Apparently Secure (NatureServe)

Scientific classification
- Kingdom: Fungi
- Division: Ascomycota
- Class: Lecanoromycetes
- Order: Lecanorales
- Family: Cladoniaceae
- Genus: Cladonia
- Species: C. parasitica

Binomial name
- Cladonia parasitica Hoffm. (1796)

Synonyms
- Cladonia delicata auct. non (Ach.) Ehrh. Flörke (1828); Cladonia squamosa var. delicata Ehrh. Fr.; Lichen parasiticus Hoffm.

= Cladonia parasitica =

Species of lichenised fungus in the family Cladoniaceae

Cladonia parasitica, commonly known as the fence-rail cladonia, fence-rail cup lichen or parasite club lichen, is a species of fruticose, cup lichen in the family Cladoniaceae. It was first described by Hoffmann in 1784 under the name Lichen parasiticus, until he reclassified it under the genus Cladonia in 1795.

== Description ==
Cladonia parasitica mainly grows on old oak and pine wood. The thallus is brown or grey. The squamules are minutely divided and look like coral or small scales. When apothecia are present they take the form of small brown morel-like protrusions atop the branches. The species is found in North America and Eurasia in the boreal, boreal-nemoral, and nemoral regions. Cladonia parasitica is considered a red-listed species in Sweden, categorized as (Near Threatened). It is used as a signal species, indicating high-value old-growth forest. Its secondary metabolites include barbatic acid, decarboxythamnolic acid and thamnolic acid.

== See also ==
- List of Cladonia species
