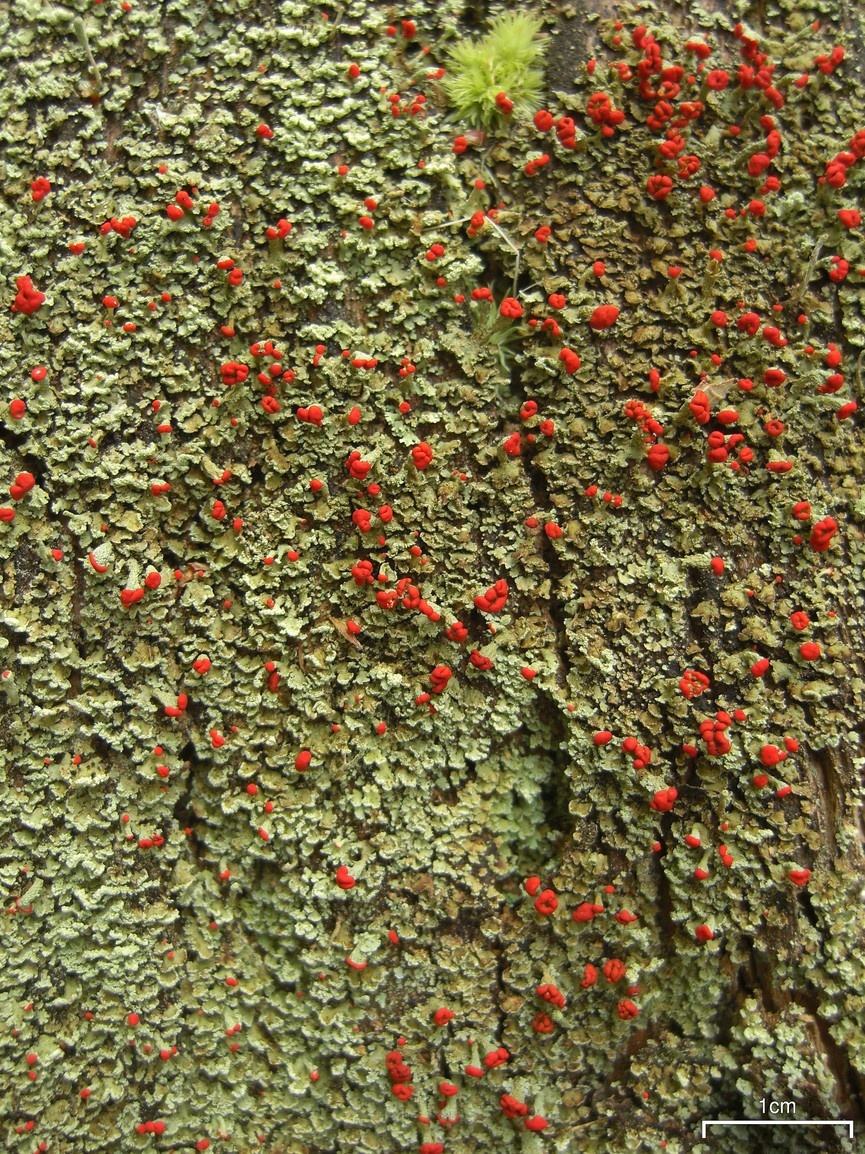

Conservation status
- Secure (NatureServe)

Scientific classification
- Kingdom: Fungi
- Division: Ascomycota
- Class: Lecanoromycetes
- Order: Lecanorales
- Family: Cladoniaceae
- Genus: Cladonia
- Species: C. incrassata

Binomial name
- Cladonia incrassata Flörke (1827)

Synonyms
- Cladonia brebissonii f. incrassata (Flörke) M.Choisy (1955); Cladonia coccifera f. incrassata (Flörke) Th.Fr. (1871); Cladonia coccifera var. incrassata (Flörke) Laurer; Cladonia cornucopioides var. incrassata (Flörke) Fr. (1845)

= Cladonia incrassata =

Species of lichen

Cladonia incrassata or the powder-foot British soldiers cup lichen is a species of cup lichen in the family Cladoniaceae. Found in Europe and North America, it was formally described as a new species in 1828 by German botanist Heinrich Gustav Flörke. A colloquial name for the lichen is "powder-foot British soldiers".

== See also ==
- List of Cladonia species
