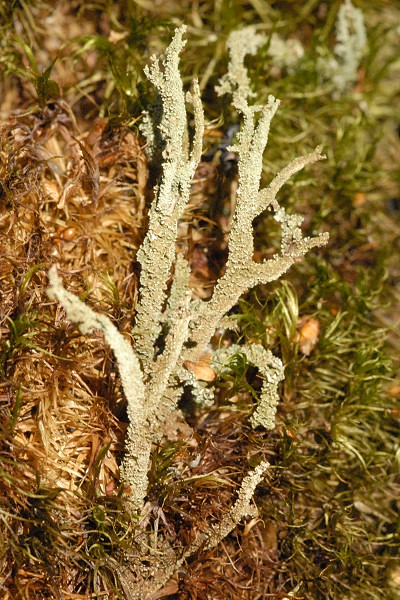

Conservation status
- Secure (NatureServe)

Scientific classification
- Kingdom: Fungi
- Division: Ascomycota
- Class: Lecanoromycetes
- Order: Lecanorales
- Family: Cladoniaceae
- Genus: Cladonia
- Species: C. squamosa

Binomial name
- Cladonia squamosa (Scop.) Hoff. (1796)

Synonyms
- Baeomyces sparassus Ach. (1803); Cenomyce sparassa (Ach.) Ach. (1814); Cenomyce squamosa (Scop.) Flörke (1819); Cladonia delicata var. subsquamosa Nyl. ex Leight. (1866); Cladonia denticollis (Hoffm.) Fink; Cladonia pityrea var. subsquamosa (Nyl.) Müll. Arg. (1886); Cladonia sparassa (Ach.) Hampe (1852); Cladonia sparassa var. denticollis (Hoffm.) M. Choisy (1951); Lichen cornutus var. squamosus (Scop.) K.G. Hagen (1782); Lichen sparassus (Ach.) Sm. (1812); Lichen squamosus Scop. (1772); Schasmaria sparassa (Ach.) Gray (1821)

= Cladonia squamosa =

Species of lichen-forming fungus

Cladonia squamosa or the dragon cup lichen is a species of cup lichen in the family Cladoniaceae.

== Description ==
The primary thallus is composed of medium-sized, crenate squamules, approximately 1.5-7 mm long, and 1-5 mm wide. The upper surface is fawn or tan to cinnamon-colored varying toward greenish grey. The apothecia are small, ranging from 0.5–3 mm. in diameter, and are located on the margin of the cups or at the ends of branches or proliferations. They are fawn to cinnamon-colored. The paraphyses are usually simple, sometimes thickened, and are brownish towards the apex. The hymenium is pale or pale-brownish below and brownish above. The asci are lecanoralean, with a thickened tholus. There are a usually 8 ascospores, which are oblong or oblong-obtuse to fusiform in shape, between 5-17 μm. long and 2.5-3.5 μm. wide. Conidia are falcate and 3-8 μm. long.

== Range ==
The species is widely distributed; it is found in Europe, North and South America, Asia, and on King George Island in Antarctica. In Nepal, Cladonia squamosa has been reported from 1,800 to 4,000 m elevation in a compilation of published records. It grows on mosses such as Chorisodontium aciphyllum, Polytrichum strictum, Andrea gainii, and Sanionia uncinata.

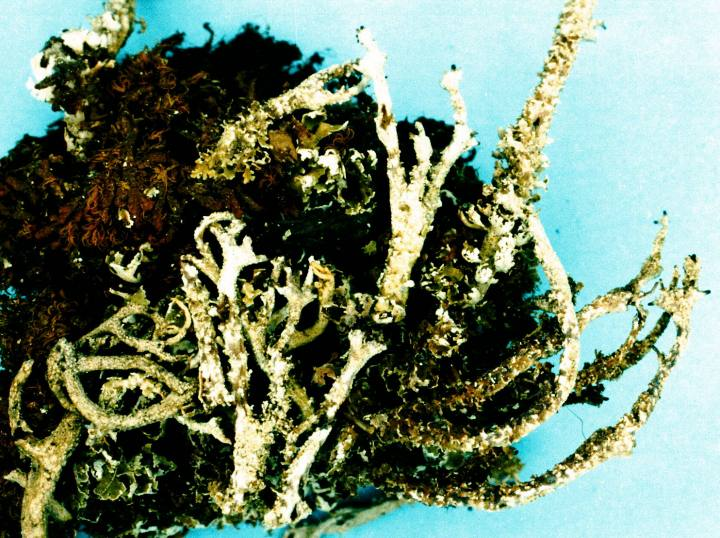
Cladonia squamosa

== Biochemistry ==
Secondary metabolites of Cladonia squamosa include barbatic acid, decarboxythamnolic acid, thamnolic acid, squamatic acid as well as various unknown or unidentified terpenes and/or terpenoids.
