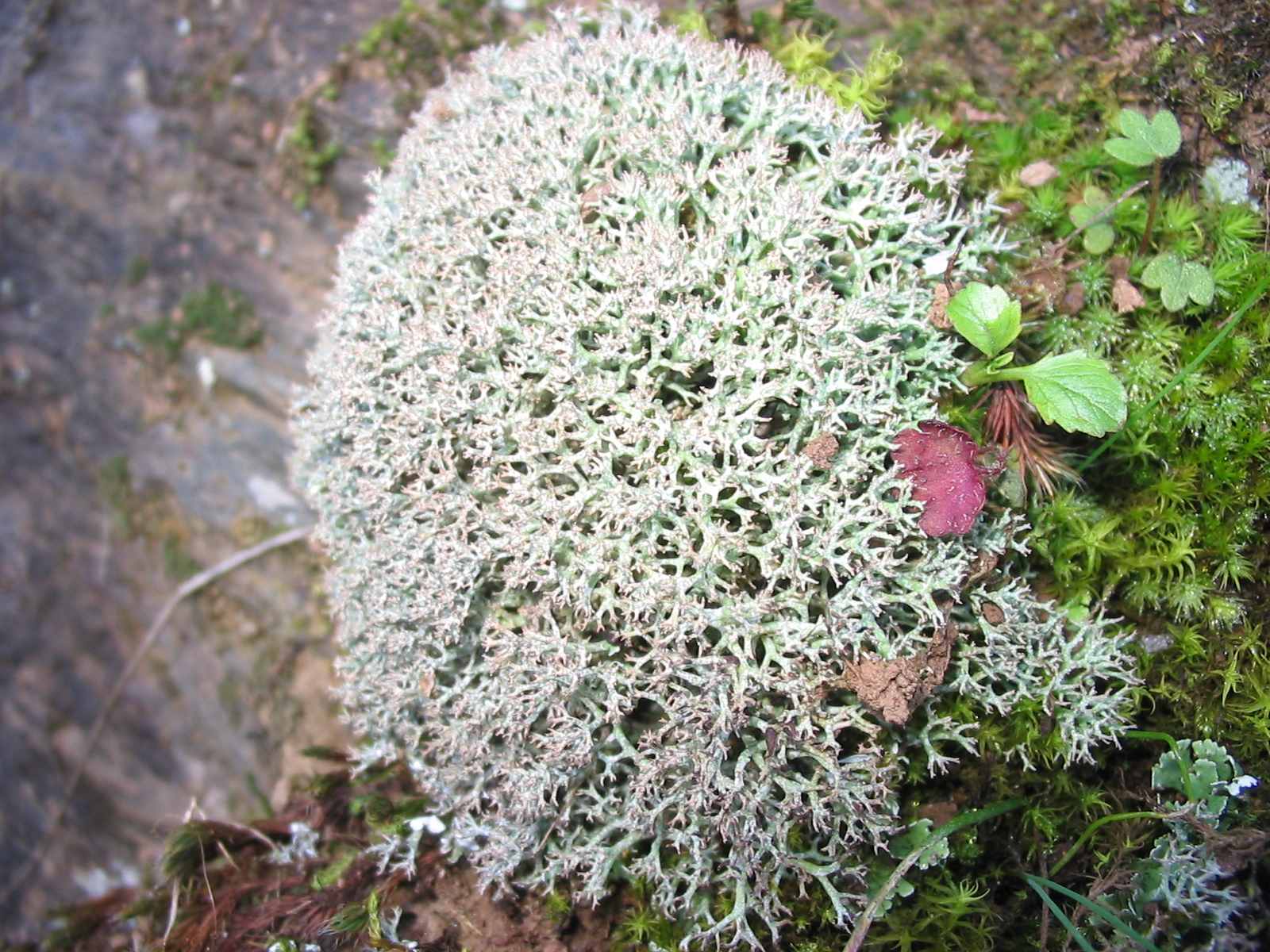

Conservation status
- Secure (NatureServe)

Scientific classification
- Kingdom: Fungi
- Division: Ascomycota
- Class: Lecanoromycetes
- Order: Lecanorales
- Family: Cladoniaceae
- Genus: Cladonia
- Species: C. stellaris

Binomial name
- Cladonia stellaris (Opiz) Pouzar & Vězda (1971)

Synonyms
- Cenomyce stellaris Opiz (1823); Cladina stellaris (Opiz) Brodo (1976)

= Cladonia stellaris =

Species of cup lichen

Cladonia stellaris (star-tipped cup lichen or star reindeer lichen) is an ecologically important species of cup lichen that forms continuous mats over large areas of the ground in boreal and arctic regions around the circumpolar north. The species is a preferred food source of reindeer and caribou during the winter months, and it has an important role in regulating nutrient cycling and soil microbiological communities. Like many other lichens, Cladonia stellaris is used by humans directly for its chemical properties, as many of the secondary metabolites are antimicrobial (e.g., Usnic acid), but it also has the unique distinction of being harvested and sold as 'fake trees' for model train displays. It is also used as a sound absorber in interior design. The species is also harvested in large quantities for ornamental use and as fodder for semi-domestic reindeer herds. The fungal portion of Cladonia stellaris, the mycobiont, protects the lichen from lichenivores, superfluous solar radiation, and other kinds of stressors in their ecosystem.

Cladonia stellaris is described as mat-forming and fruticose (shrub-like) in appearance, and as terrestrial, terricolous, or epigeic, because it grows on the surface of bare soil or gravel. Like most other lichens, Cladonia stellaris grows slowly, averaging less than 0.5 cm per year under good conditions. This species differs from the similar Cladonia rangiferina and Cladonia arbuscula in that it forms much more distinct cushion-shaped patches, and appears to have denser branching when viewed from above.

In Nepal, Cladonia stellaris has been reported from 4,400 to 4,500 m elevation in a compilation of published records; this reported range lies above the tree line used in the study.

After an online vote sponsored by the Canadian Museum of Nature, the star-tipped cup lichen was unofficially crowned Canada's national lichen.

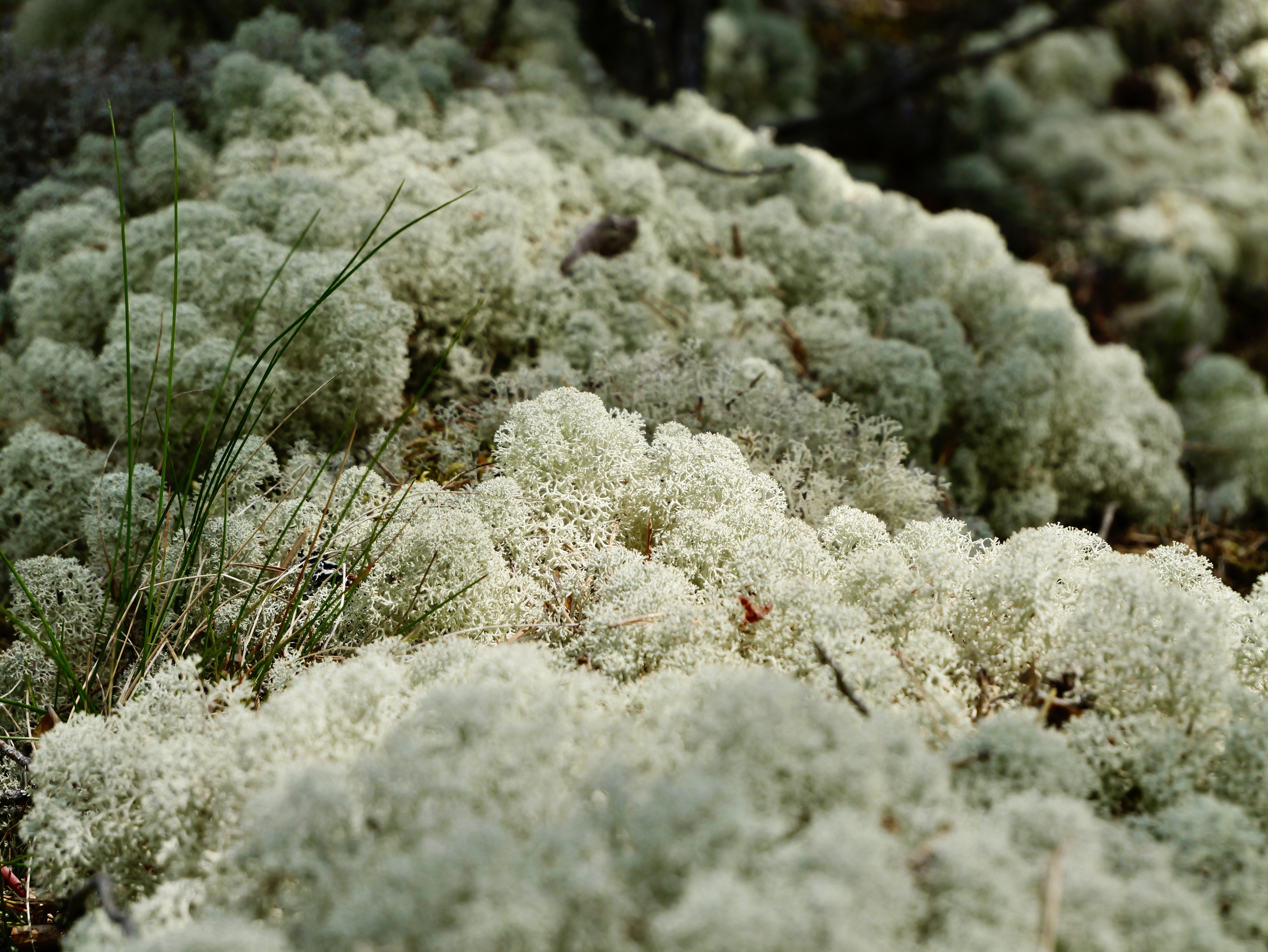
Cladonia stellaris in pine forest - Almunge, Uppsala Country, Sweden

== See also ==
- List of Cladonia species
