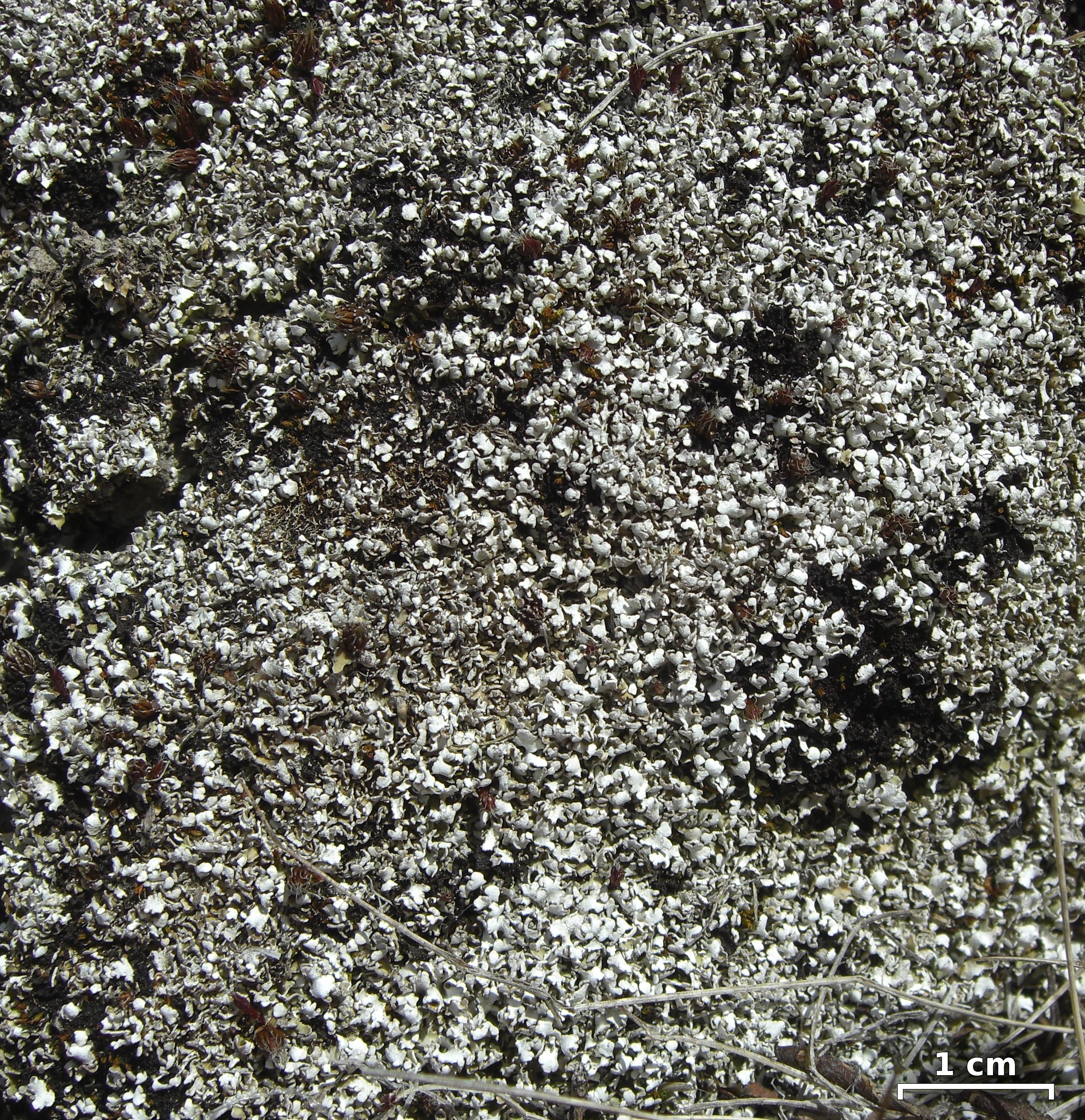
- In Turnbull National Wildlife Refuge, Washington

Conservation status
- Secure (NatureServe)

Scientific classification
- Kingdom: Fungi
- Division: Ascomycota
- Class: Lecanoromycetes
- Order: Lecanorales
- Family: Cladoniaceae
- Genus: Cladonia
- Species: C. cariosa

Binomial name
- Cladonia cariosa (Lilj.) Spreng. (1827)

Synonyms
- List: Lichen cariosus Lilj. (1798); Baeomyces cariosus (Lilj.) Ach. (1803); Cenomyce cariosa (Lilj.) Ach. (1810); Scyphophorus cariosus (Lilj.) Sm. (1844); Cladonia pyxidata var. cariosa (Lilj.) Rabenh. (1845); Cladonia degenerans var. cariosa (Lilj.) Tuck. (1845); Cladonia fimbriata var. cariosa (Lilj.) Körb. (1855); Cladonia gracilis e cariosa (Lilj.) Mudd (1861); Patellaria symphycarpa var. cribrosa Wallr. (1831); Cladonia cariosa var. cribrosa Vain. (1894); Cladonia cariosa f. cribrosa Fink (1935)

= Cladonia cariosa =

Species of lichen-forming fungus

Cladonia cariosa is a species of fruticose lichen in the family Cladoniaceae. The species is characterised by its thick, tongue-shaped basal scales and upright grey-green stalks that lack the cup-like structures found in many related lichens, instead being topped with large chocolate-brown fruiting bodies. It has a cosmopolitan distribution and commonly grows on soil in both calcium-rich and calcium-poor sites across northern North America. The lichen is also known by the common names split-peg lichen and split-peg soldiers.

== Taxonomy ==
The species name is based on Lichen cariosus, published by the Swedish botanist Samuel Liljeblad in 1798. A Swedish specimen from material preserved in Acharius's herbarium has been designated as the lectotype for the name. In a 1799 treatment, Erik Acharius described the lichen as having cartilaginous thalli with small, somewhat rounded lobes that were crenulate (finely scalloped) along the margins. The upper surface was whitish-green with scattered, wartlike protuberances, whilst the lower surface was divided and bore purple apothecia (fruiting bodies). He recorded it from bare, infertile ground, including camps.

In his 1799 account, Acharius provided the habitat note Ob scyphos nullos vel faltem omnino imperfectos inter Scyphophoros locum obtinere non potest nec debet ('Because it has no cups or at least completely imperfect ones, it cannot and should not obtain a place among the Scyphophoros'), indicating his taxonomic reasoning for not placing it within the cup lichen group. He observed simple structures with a single terminal tubercle. The species epithet cariosus refers to the decayed or carious appearance of the lichen, reflecting the wartlike texture of its upper surface that Acharius noted in his original description. Kurt Sprengel transferred the taxon to the genus Cladonia in 1827. In his treatment, Sprengel provided additional details about the podetia, describing them as whitish with a carious-cancellate (decayed and lattice-like) surface texture, and noted that the apothecia were dilated and divided at the apex.

A 2024 study sequenced the ITS region and analysed secondary metabolites using thin-layer chromatography for western North American members of the "C. cariosa group". The ITS data recovered the group as a supported clade with several subgroups, and patterns in morphology and chemistry did not line up consistently with the ITS tree. The study also found that several specimens identified as C. cariosa fell outside the main "C. cariosa core" while remaining chemically indistinguishable from it, suggesting that the name has sometimes been applied to more than one lineage and that limits within the group remain unsettled. Within the core group, subclades tended to be geographically clustered.

Common names given to this species include the "split-peg lichen" and "split-peg soldiers".

== Description ==
The primary thallus typically forms a low mat about 2–6(9) mm deep, made up of small to medium squamules about 1–3(6) by (0.5)1–1.5 mm. The upper surface is pale green to olive or tan, smooth to slightly roughened, sometimes lightly pruinose near the edges. The podetia are mostly 1–3 cm tall, simple to branched, and often have sides that are fissured and split; they usually bear terminal, convex to almost spherical, brown to dark-brown apothecia.

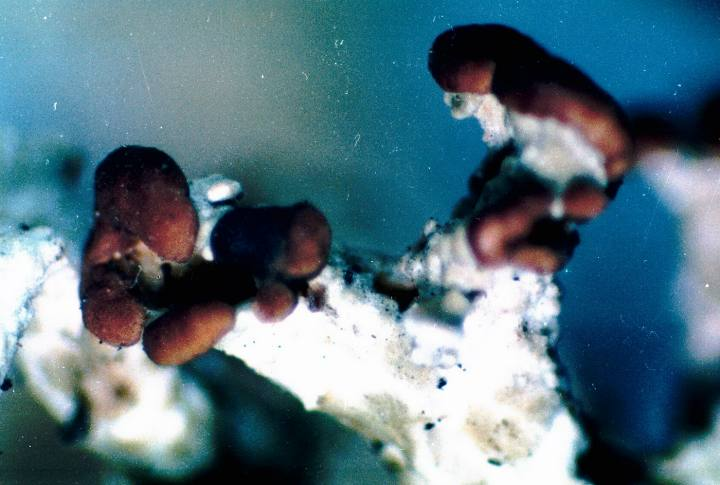
Herbarium specimen showing chocolate-brown apothecia

In the western North American material treated as C. cariosa in a strict sense, all specimens contained atranorin. Five chemotypes were detected: atranorin alone (most frequent), or atranorin with fumarprotocetraric acid, homosekikaic acid, norstictic acid, or porphyrilic acid. Rangiformic acid has been reported as an additional substance in some chemotypes, although the authors note that their newly sequenced specimens were not screened for fatty acids such as rangiformic acid because of the type of TLC plates used.

Cladonia peziziformis is somewhat similar in appearance, but can be distinguished by differences in chemistry, the paler brown colour of its apothecia, and its greener podetia. Squamulose Cladonia colonies that lack podetia are often difficult to identify, because many diagnostic characters are on the podetia; when podetia are absent, chemical tests may be inconclusive and DNA sequencing may be needed. Within the C. cariosa group, mixed or poorly developed material is common; the 2024 study suggests checking different parts of a collection by spot-testing individual squamules, especially when they vary in appearance. For specimens without DNA data, it suggests restricting Cladonia galindezii to material with large squamules forming a deep cushion and containing porphyrilic acid, while noting that young or stressed colonies may be indistinguishable from C. cariosa without sequencing.

== Habitat and distribution ==
Cladonia cariosa is a widespread lichen with a cosmopolitan distribution. It grows directly on soil in calcium-rich and calcium-poor sites, and also in sun-exposed sandy soil. It is widely distributed in northern North America. In western North America it has been collected on soil in a range of settings, including roadcuts (both open and partially shaded), shale-derived soils, and sagebrush grassland soils. In Nepal, the lichen has been reported at 3,100 m elevation in a compilation of published records.

Lichenozyma pisutiana is a yeast in the class Cystobasidiomycetes that has been found associating with Cladonia cariosa.

== See also ==
- List of Cladonia species
