= Cladonia mongkolsukii =

Scientific classification
- Domain: Eukaryota
- Kingdom: Fungi
- Division: Ascomycota
- Class: Lecanoromycetes
- Order: Lecanorales
- Family: Cladoniaceae
- Genus: Cladonia
- Species: C. mongkolsukii

Binomial name
- Cladonia mongkolsukii Parnmen & Ahti (2011)

Species of lichen

Cladonia mongkolsukii is a species of fruticose lichen in the family Cladoniaceae. Described as new to science in 2011, it is found in lower-elevation montane scrub forests of northeast Thailand and in Sri Lanka. The specific epithet honors Pachara Mongolsuk, a Thai lichenologist.

== Taxonomy ==
Cladonia mongkolsukii was first described by Sittiporn Parnmen and Teuvo Ahti. The species name honours Thai lichenologist Pachara Mongolsuk. The type specimen was collected by the first author in Phu Hin Rong Kla National Park, Pitsanulok Province, Thailand, at an elevation of 1,110 m (3,640 ft).

=== Phylogenetic analysis ===
A molecular phylogenetic analysis based on internal transcribed spacer sequence data placed Cladonia mongkolsukii near Cladonia singhii. This clade also includes Cladonia fimbriata, Cladonia gracilis, and Cladonia ochrochlora. The latter three species were grouped into the "supergroup" Cladonia by Stenroos et al. (2002).

== Description ==
The primary thallus of Cladonia mongkolsukii is persistent, with irregularly lobed to deeply laciniate segments measuring 0.7–1.8 mm long and 0.2–0.8 mm wide. The lower surface is white and ecorticate, while the upper surface is greenish and corticate. The podetia, or stalk-like structures, are 10–65 mm tall, 0.3–3 mm thick, and are whitish grey to brownish in colour. They may be unbranched or slightly branched at the apex, and initially lack cup-like structures (ascyphose), but soon develop very narrow scyphi (1–3 mm in diameter) at the tips.

The surface of the podetia is rough and either ecorticate or discontinuously corticate with microsquamules. These microsquamules are more densely distributed near the tips. The apothecia, or spore-producing structures, are pale brown to orange or brownish and are terminal on the podetia. The ascospores number eight per ascus. They are simple, hyaline, oblong to ellipsoid in shape, and typically have dimensions in the range 9–9.5–10 by 2.7–2.9–3.1 μm. In terms of secondary chemistry, C. mongkolsukii contains both fumarprotocetraric acid and homosekikaic acid as major lichen products.

Cladonia mongkolsukii differs from the similar Himalayan species, Cladonia awasthiana, by having podetia that are esorediate (lacking soredia) and microsquamulose (possessing tiny squamules), which are not densely squamulose near the tips.

== Habitat and distribution ==
Cladonia mongkolsukii is known to grow in lower-elevation montane scrub forests in northeast Thailand, specifically within Phu Hin Rong Kla National Park. At this locality, the lichen species is typically found on rocks at elevations around 1110 metres. In 2014, it was reported from Sri Lanka, which was a new record for the Indian subcontinent.

== See also ==
- List of Cladonia species
