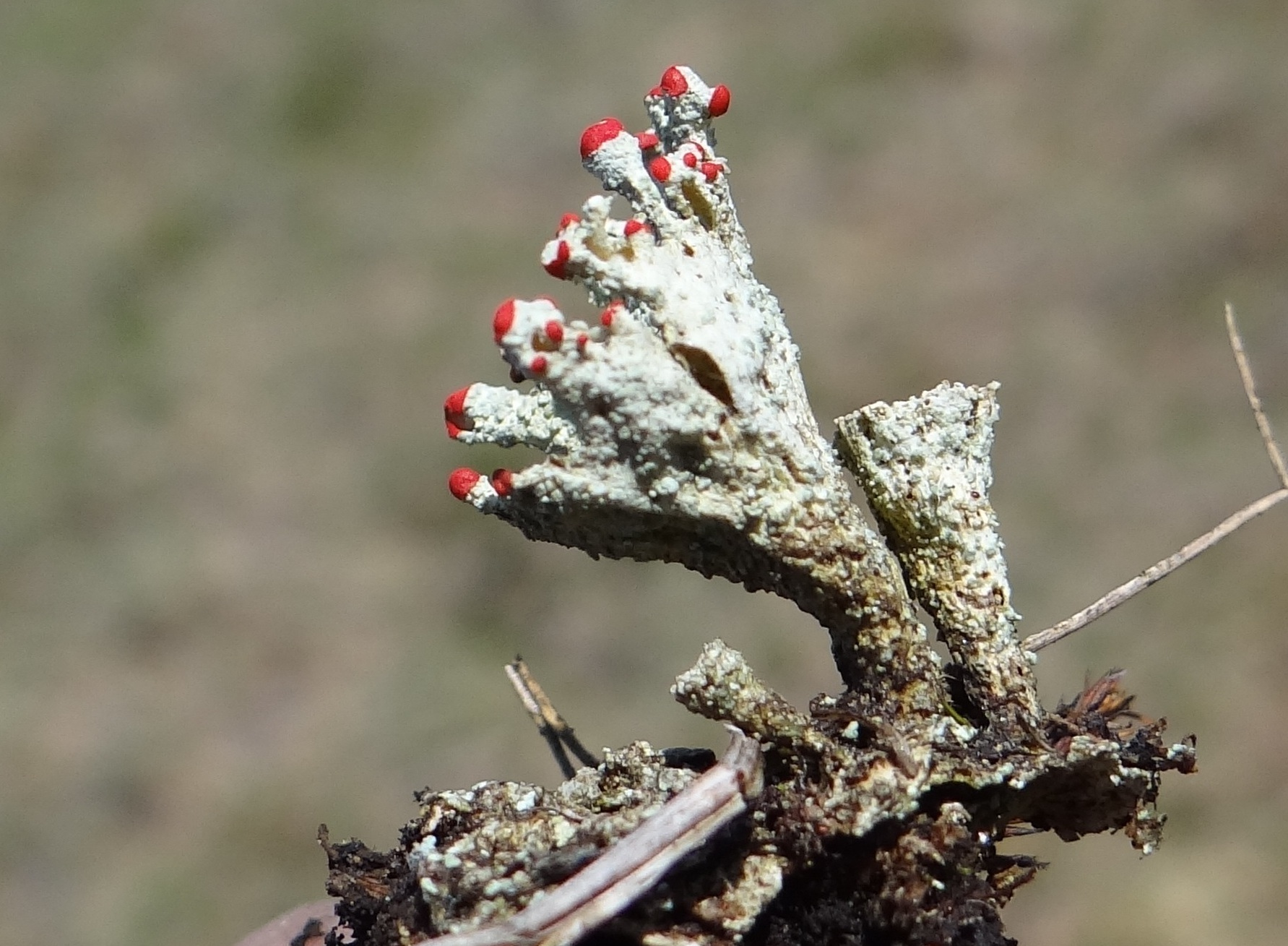

Conservation status
- Secure (NatureServe)

Scientific classification
- Kingdom: Fungi
- Division: Ascomycota
- Class: Lecanoromycetes
- Order: Lecanorales
- Family: Cladoniaceae
- Genus: Cladonia
- Species: C. pleurota

Binomial name
- Cladonia pleurota (Flörke) Schaer. (1850)

Synonyms
- Capitularia pleurota Flörke (1808)

= Cladonia pleurota =

Species of lichen

Cladonia pleurota is a species of fruticose, cup lichen in the family Cladoniaceae. It was first formally described as a new species by German lichenologist Heinrich Gustav Flörke in 1808 as Capitularia pleurota. Ludwig Emanuel Schaerer transferred it to the genus Cladonia in 1850. In North America, it is known colloquially as the red-fruited pixie cup or the red-fruited cup lichen.

== See also ==
- List of Cladonia species
