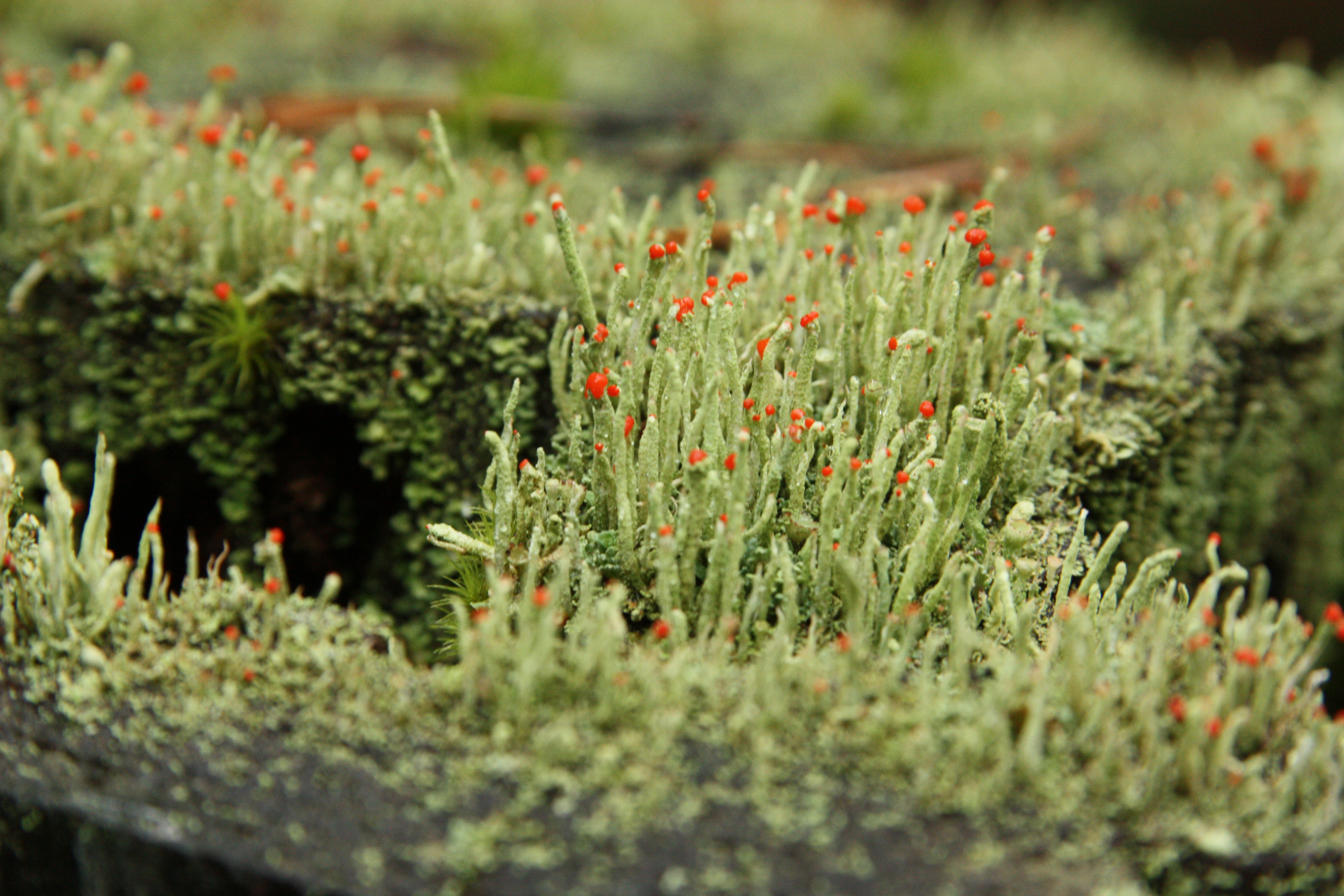

Conservation status
- Secure (NatureServe)

Scientific classification
- Kingdom: Fungi
- Division: Ascomycota
- Class: Lecanoromycetes
- Order: Lecanorales
- Family: Cladoniaceae
- Genus: Cladonia
- Species: C. macilenta

Binomial name
- Cladonia macilenta Hoffm. (1796)

Synonyms
- Cladonia bacillaris f. subscyphifera (Vain.) Sandst.; Cladonia coccifera f. macilenta (Hoffm.) Mudd; Cladonia macilenta subf. rubiformis (Rabenh.) M.Choisy; Cladonia coccifera scabrosa Mudd; Cladonia bacillaris subscyphifera Vain.; Cladonia macilenta var. flabellulata Müll.Arg.; Cladonia cylindrica var. squamigera (Vain.) M.Choisy; Cladonia digitata var. macilenta (Hoffm.) Leight.; Cladonia macilenta var. squamigera Vain.; Cladonia cylindrica var. vermicularis (Rabenh.) M.Choisy; Cladonia brebissonii var. ostreata (Nyl.) M.Choisy; Verrucaster lichenicola Tobler (1912)

= Cladonia macilenta =

Species of lichen-forming fungus

Cladonia macilenta or the lipstick cup lichen is a species of cup lichen in the family Cladoniaceae.

The species is red listed in Iceland as an endangered species (EN). While it is found in various regions of the UK, it is considered potentially threatened in parts of the lowlands due to habitat loss.

Verrucaster lichenicola, described by Friedrich Tobler in 1913, was proposed to be a fungus with waxy pycnidia and hyaline conidia lacking septa. It was, however, a little-known taxon, as the type specimen was lost and not collected again. The rediscovery of the type material more than a century later revealed that what Tobler thought to be a lichenicolous fungus was instead pycnidia of Cladonia macilenta, and thus the two taxa are placed in synonymy.

== Description ==
Cladonia macilenta is small- to medium-sized amongst other Cladonia species and lacks cups even at maturity. It is often mistaken for Cladonia polydactyla, because some morphs of that species can lack cups, particularly when pollution-stressed, shaded, or juvenile. But C. macilenta can be differentiated by coloration (C. macilenta is typically white or grey, while C. polydactyla is typically blue-grey) or by the reproductive structures (soredia) which are granular in C. polydactyla and more mealy (farinose) in C. macilenta.

== Habitat and distribution ==
Typically, Cladonia macilenta is found in open or well-lit wooded areas and heathlands growing on strongly acidic wood and soil. In Nepal, the lichen has been reported from 1,500 to 3,800 m elevation in a compilation of published records.
