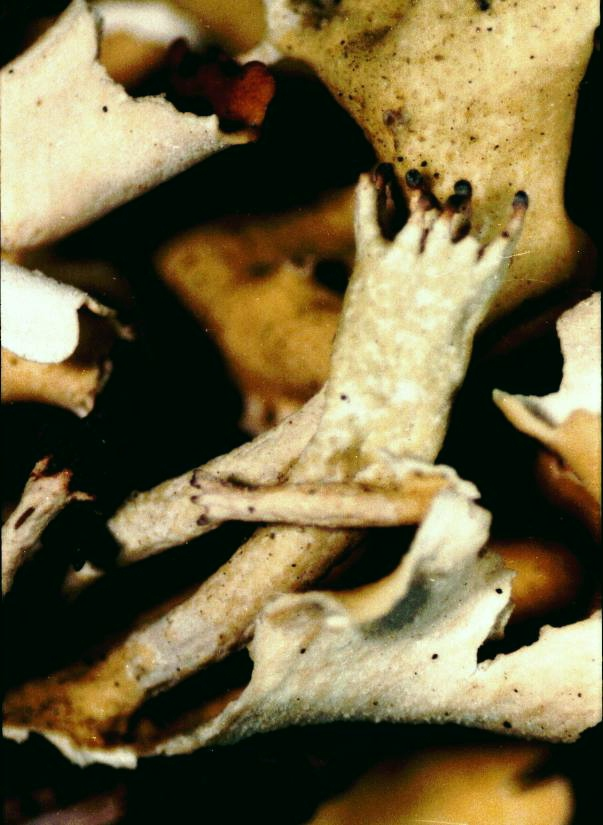

Conservation status
- Secure (NatureServe)

Scientific classification
- Kingdom: Fungi
- Division: Ascomycota
- Class: Lecanoromycetes
- Order: Lecanorales
- Family: Cladoniaceae
- Genus: Cladonia
- Species: C. turgida

Binomial name
- Cladonia turgida Ehrh. ex Hoffm. (1796)

= Cladonia turgida =

Species of lichen

Cladonia turgida or the crazy-scale cup lichen is a species of cup lichen in the family Cladoniaceae.

Cladonia turgida contains atranorin and fumarprotocetraric acid with the latter compound sometimes in low quantities.
