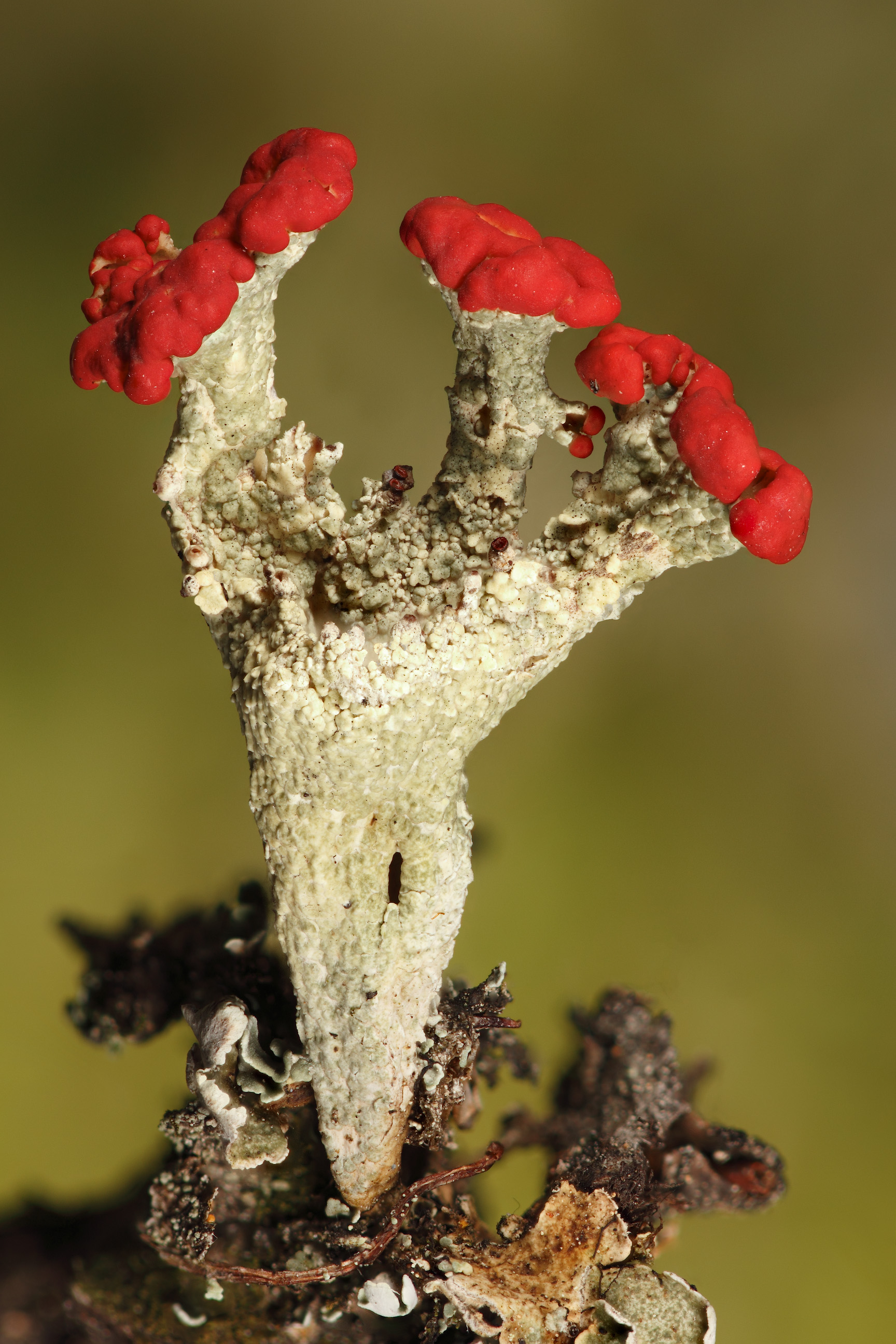

Conservation status
- Secure (NatureServe)

Scientific classification
- Kingdom: Fungi
- Division: Ascomycota
- Class: Lecanoromycetes
- Order: Lecanorales
- Family: Cladoniaceae
- Genus: Cladonia
- Species: C. coccifera

Binomial name
- Cladonia coccifera (L.) Willd. (1787)

Synonyms
- Lichen cocciferus L. (1753); Lichen pyxidatus var. cocciferus (L.) Weiss (1770); Scyphophorus cocciferus (L.) Gray (1821); Cladonia cornucopioides var. coccifera (L.) Körb. (1854); Cladonia coccifera var. asotea (Ach.) Grognot (1863); Cladonia coccifera f. asotea (Ach.) Vain. (1887)

= Cladonia coccifera =

Species of lichen-forming fungus

Cladonia coccifera or madame's cup lichen is a species of fruticose, cup lichen in the family Cladoniaceae. It was first described by Swedish lichenologist Carl Linnaeus in his 1753 work Species Plantarum. German botanist Carl Ludwig Willdenow transferred it to the genus Cladonia in 1787. The lichen has apothecia and bright red pycnidia atop of yellowish to grey-green podetia that are 1–2 cm (0.4–0.8 in) high. The base of the thallus comprises rounded squamules (scales) with a yellow to orange-brown undersurface. It typically occurs on acidic peaty and sandy soils.

The lichen has a circumpolar distribution in the Northern Hemisphere, which extends south to the Himalayas. In Nepal, Cladonia coccifera has been reported from 2,000 to 4,000 m elevation in a compilation of published records.

== See also ==
- List of Cladonia species
- List of lichens named by Carl Linnaeus
