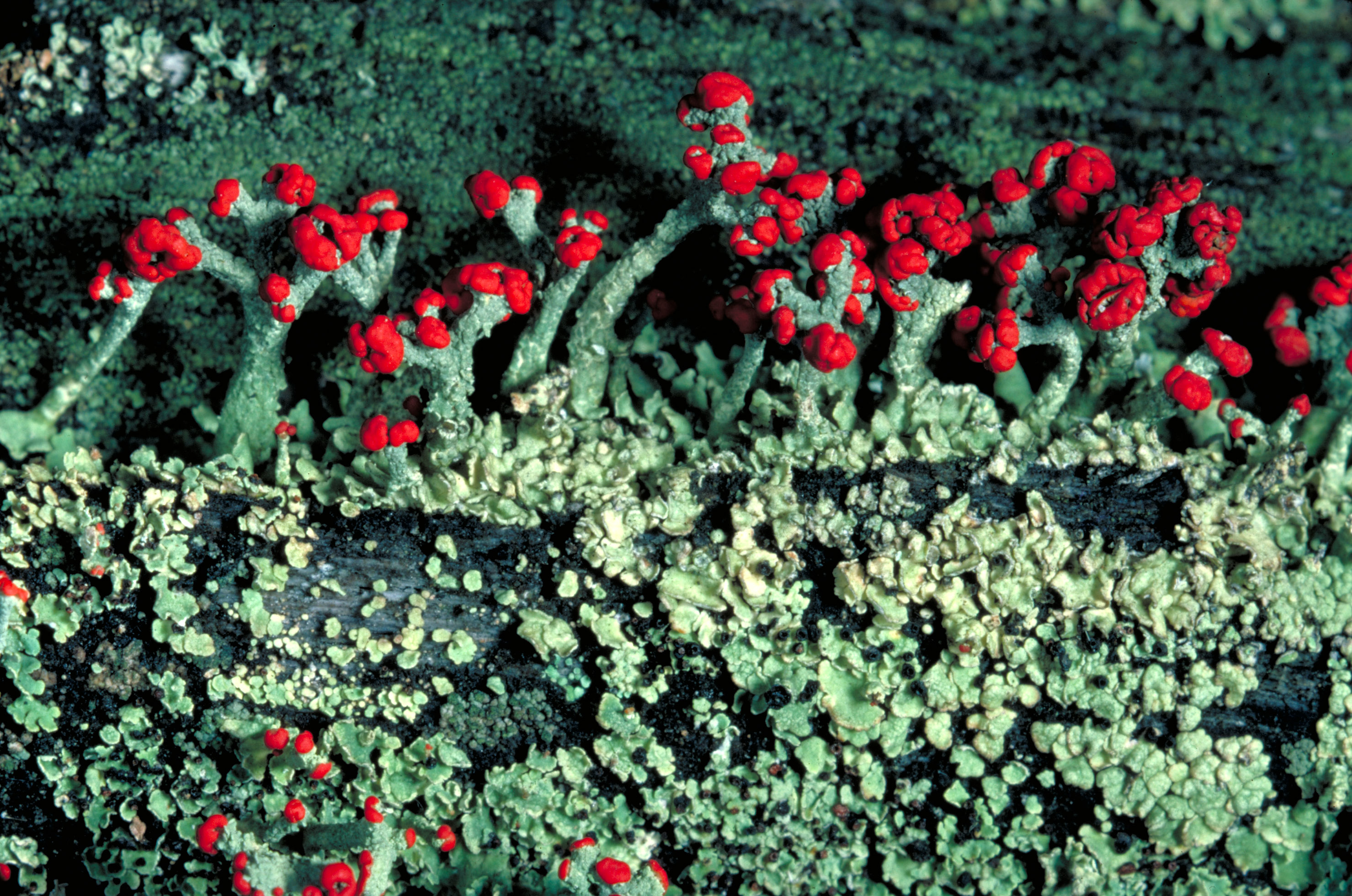

Conservation status
- Secure (NatureServe)

Scientific classification
- Kingdom: Fungi
- Division: Ascomycota
- Class: Lecanoromycetes
- Order: Lecanorales
- Family: Cladoniaceae
- Genus: Cladonia
- Species: C. cristatella

Binomial name
- Cladonia cristatella Tuck. (1858)

= Cladonia cristatella =

Species of lichenised fungus in the family Cladoniaceae

Cladonia cristatella, commonly known as the British soldiers lichen or the British soldiers cup lichen, is a fruticose, cup lichen belonging to the family Cladoniaceae. The species was first described scientifically by American botanist Edward Tuckerman in 1858. This lichen may be confused with other red-topped lichens including Cladonia leporina and Cladonia incrassata.

== See also ==
- List of Cladonia species
