= Red Cross Medal (Oldenburg) =

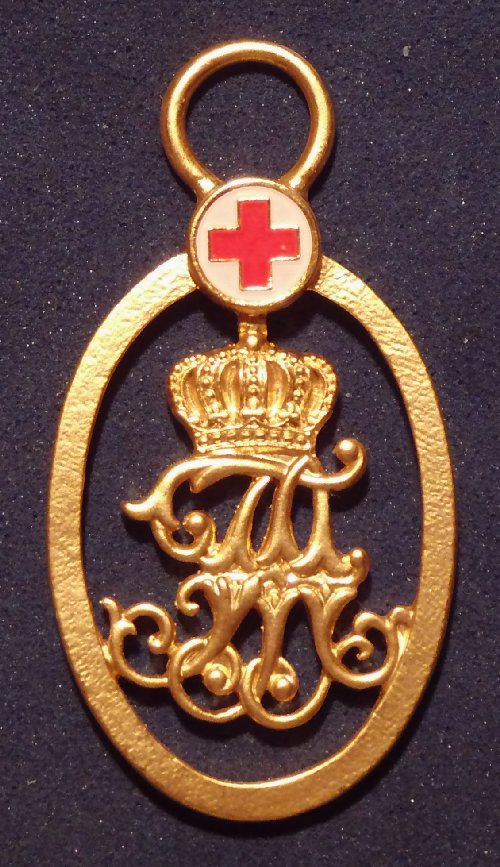
Oldenburg Red Cross Medal

Ribbon of the medal

The Red Cross Medal was established on 10 August 1907 by Frederick Augustus II, Grand Duke of Oldenburg. The medal was presented for outstanding service in charitable civic service and voluntary nursing. It was presented to men and women who had rendered outstanding services in these areas.

== Appearance ==
The medal is oval, made of gilded bronze. The center is cut out around the monogram FA, which is surmounted by a crown. At the top of the oval is an enameled disc with a red Greek cross on a white background. The medal hangs from a dark blue ribbon with vermilion stripes.
