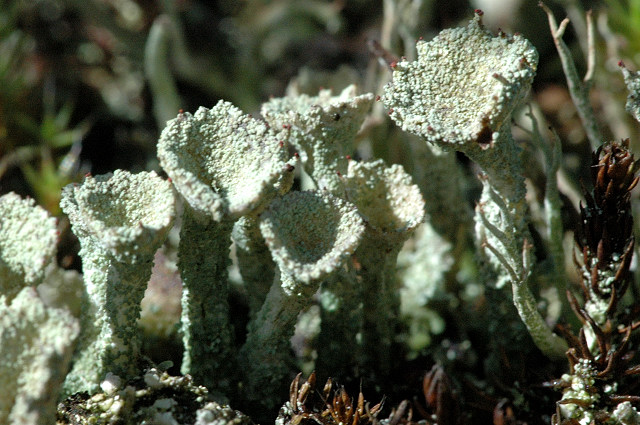

Conservation status
- Secure (NatureServe)

Scientific classification
- Kingdom: Fungi
- Division: Ascomycota
- Class: Lecanoromycetes
- Order: Lecanorales
- Family: Cladoniaceae
- Genus: Cladonia
- Species: C. deformis

Binomial name
- Cladonia deformis (L.) Hoffm. (1796)

= Cladonia deformis =

Species of lichen-forming fungus

Cladonia deformis, also known as the lesser sulphur cup or the lesser sulphur cup lichen, is a light-coloured, fruticose, cup lichen belonging to the family Cladoniaceae. This lichen was first described as Lichen deformis by Carl Linnaeus in 1753, and transferred to the genus Cladonia in 1796 by Georg Franz Hoffmann.

As of July 2021, its conservation status has not been estimated by the IUCN. In Iceland, its conservation status is denoted as data deficient (DD).

== See also ==
- List of lichens named by Carl Linnaeus
