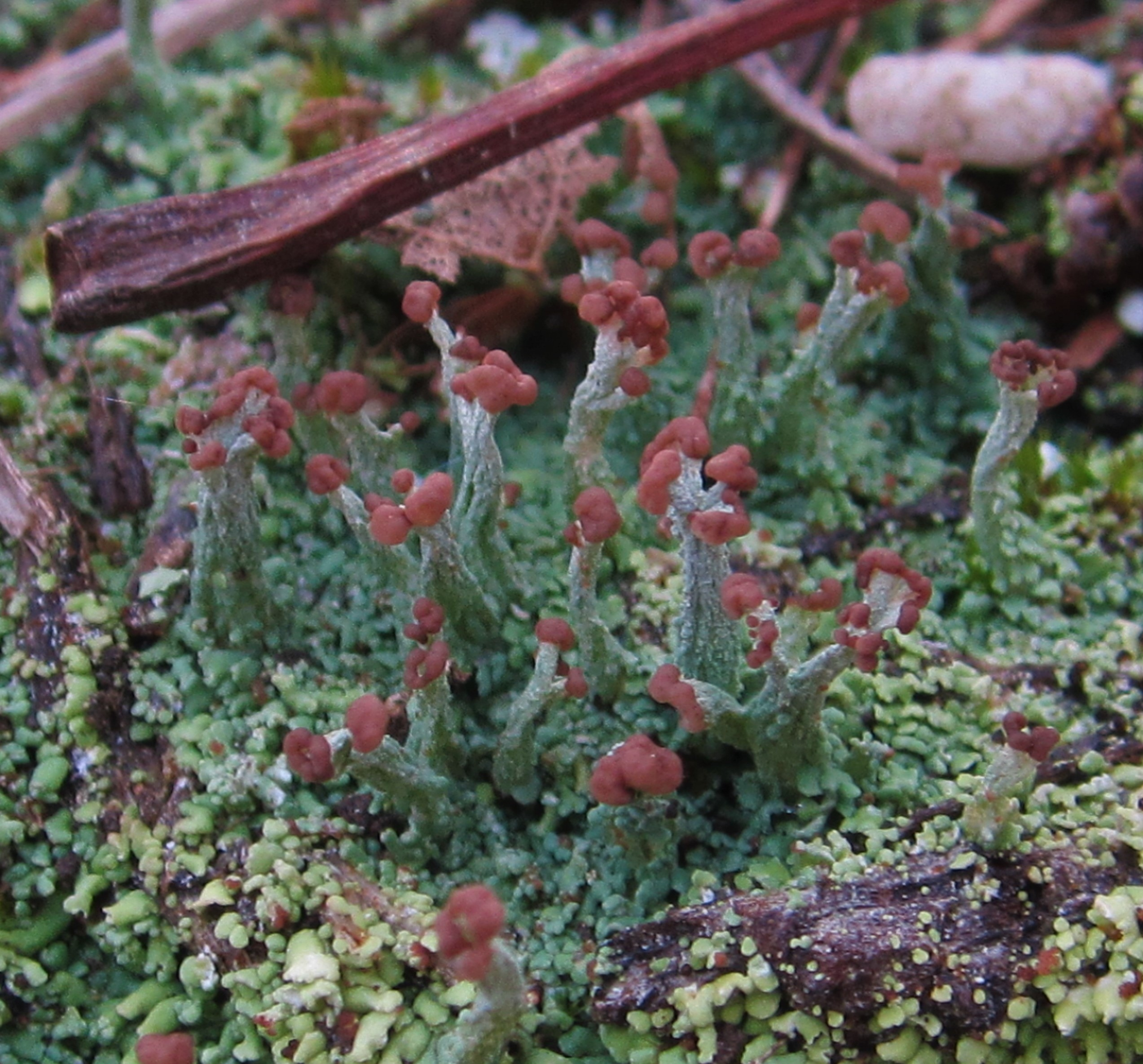

Conservation status
- Secure (NatureServe)

Scientific classification
- Kingdom: Fungi
- Division: Ascomycota
- Class: Lecanoromycetes
- Order: Lecanorales
- Family: Cladoniaceae
- Genus: Cladonia
- Species: C. peziziformis

Binomial name
- Cladonia peziziformis (With.) J.R. Laundon

Synonyms
- Lichen peziziformis With.; Helopodium leptophyllum (Ach.) Gray; Cladonia leptophylla (Ach.) Flörke; Cladonia capitata Spreng.; Cenomyce leptophylla Ach.

= Cladonia peziziformis =

Species of lichen

Cladonia peziziformis or the turban cup lichen is a species of cup lichen in the family Cladoniaceae.
