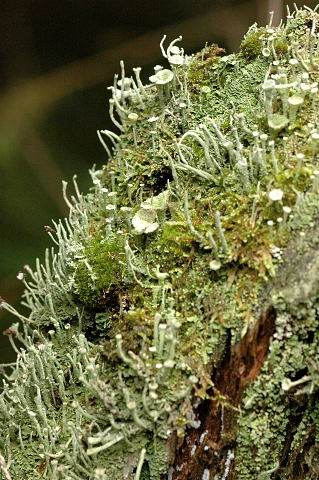
- Cladonia coniocraea

Conservation status
- Secure (NatureServe)

Scientific classification
- Kingdom: Fungi
- Division: Ascomycota
- Class: Lecanoromycetes
- Order: Lecanorales
- Family: Cladoniaceae
- Genus: Cladonia
- Species: C. coniocraea

Binomial name
- Cladonia coniocraea (Flörke) Spreng.

= Cladonia coniocraea =

Species of lichenised fungus in the family Cladoniaceae

Cladonia coniocraea, commonly known as the common powderhorn or the powderhorn cup lichen, is a species of fruticose, cup lichen in the family Cladoniaceae. It was first described by Heinrich Gustav Flörke in 1821 under the name Cenomyce coniocraea, until Kurt Polycarp Joachim Sprengel reclassified it under the genus Cladonia in 1827.

As of July 2021, its conservation status has not been estimated by the IUCN. In Iceland, its conservation status is denoted as data deficient (DD).
