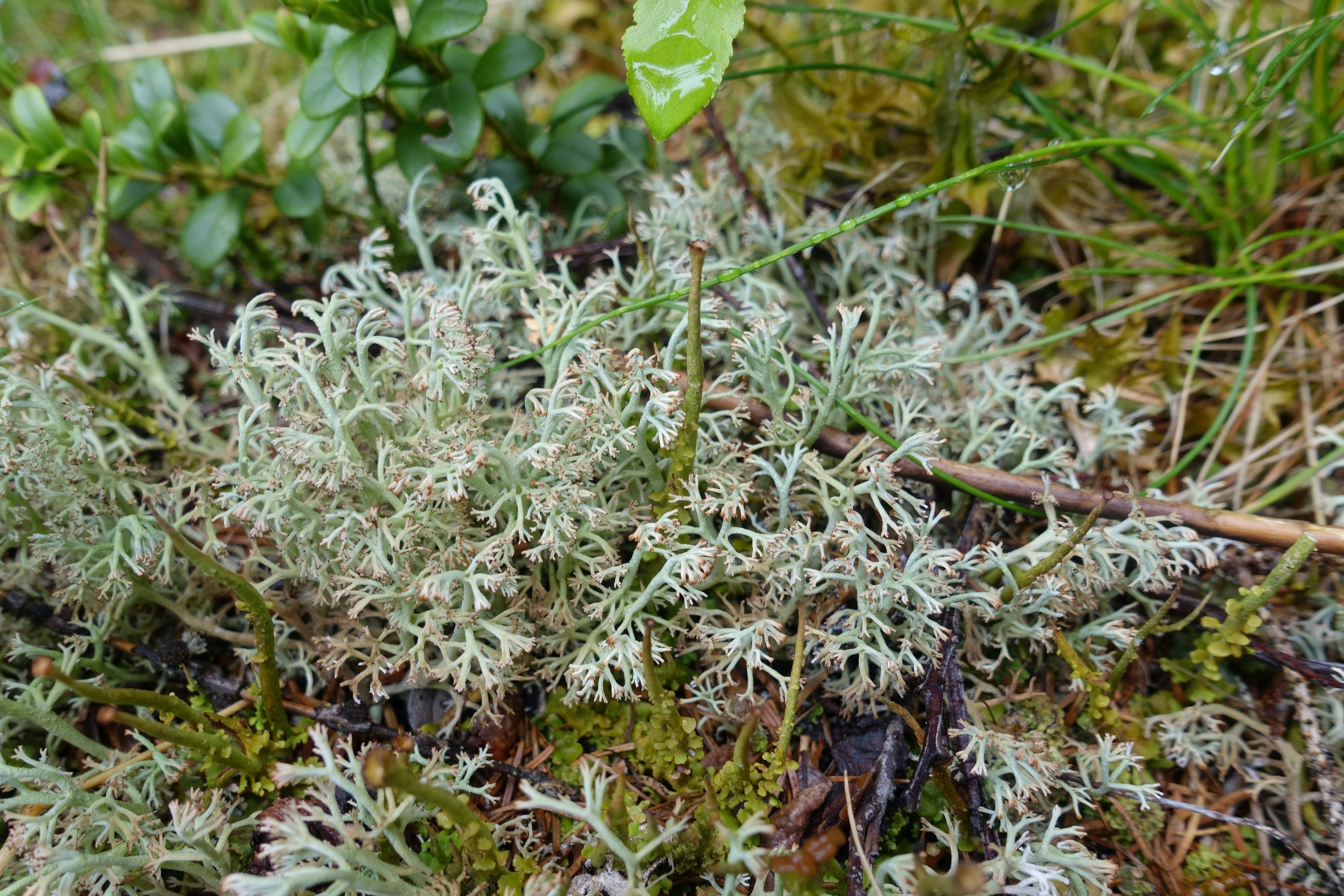

Conservation status
- Secure (NatureServe)

Scientific classification
- Kingdom: Fungi
- Division: Ascomycota
- Class: Lecanoromycetes
- Order: Lecanorales
- Family: Cladoniaceae
- Genus: Cladonia
- Species: C. arbuscula

Binomial name
- Cladonia arbuscula (Wallr.) Flot.

Synonyms
- List: Cenomyce sylvatica var. lacerata Delise; Cenomyce sylvatica var. morbida Delise; Cladina arbuscula (Wallr.) Hale & W. L. Culb.; Cladonia sylvatica fm. valida Rabenh.; Cladina arbuscula; Cladina imshaugii (Ahti) Ahti; Cladonia arbuscula f. arbuscula; Cladonia arbuscula f. caerulescens (Schade) Grummann; Cladonia arbuscula f. decumbens (Anders) Asahina; Cladonia arbuscula f. subspumosa (Coem.) Grummann; Cladonia arbuscula f. subspumosa (Coem.) Grummann

= Cladonia arbuscula =

Species of cup lichen

Cladonia arbuscula, also referred to as shrubby cup lichen or green reindeer lichen, is a species of cup lichen in the family Cladoniaceae.

== Description ==
The lichen is composed of two thalli; an initial primary squamulose thallus growing across bark in a scaly, flaking pattern, followed by a secondary fruticose thallus (podetium), with cup shaped podetia (4–10 cm tall) bearing terminal ascocarps contained in apothecial structures. The coloring of C. arbuscula varies between subspecies, but is primarily white-gray, pale yellow, or bright green, with darker orange tips where ascocarps are formed. The thallus shows negative results in typical K-tests with no color change.

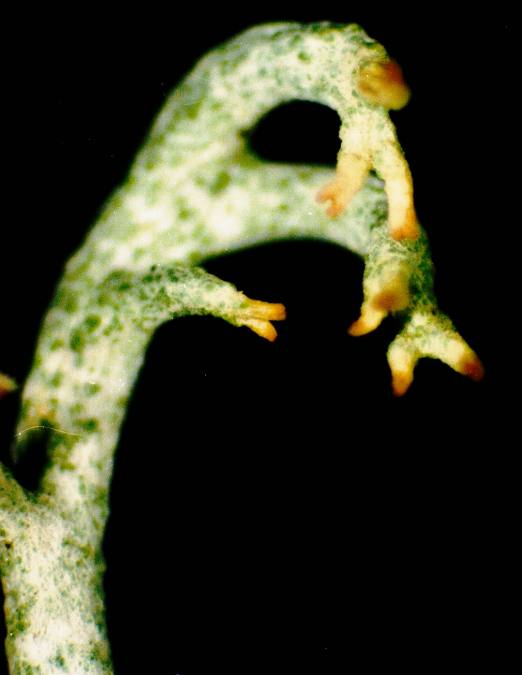
Magnified view of Cladonia arbuscula podetium with dark terminal ascocarps.

== Taxonomy ==
=== Name ===
The species name "arbuscula" is Latin for the word "bush" or "shrub", which may be due to the fact that the lichen has branches that resemble a bush.

=== Subspecies ===
C. arbuscula has 6 subspecies:

- Cladonia arbuscula subsp. arbuscula (Wallr.) Flot.
- Cladonia arbuscula subsp. beringiana Ahti
- Cladonia arbuscula subsp. boliviana (Ahti) Ahti & De Priest
- Cladonia arbuscula subsp. imshaugii (Ahti) Ahti & De Priest
- Cladonia arbuscula subsp. mitis (Sandst.) Ruoss
- Cladonia arbuscula subsp. pachyderma (Ahti) Ahti & De Priest

== Distribution and habitat ==
=== Global distribution ===
C. arbuscula is found throughout the world, tolerating harsh conditions that many vegetative plants cannot. It is widely spread in Canada and the Northern United States (mostly Alaska), but also found in Wyoming, Idaho, and Montana. Although it is relatively uncommon in the Pacific Northwest, it can be found there. Common in Labrador and Newfoundland and found throughout England and Ireland. It has been found in more southern latitudes such as Chile, Tasmania, and New Zealand as well, but is most dominant in northern latitudes. The lichen is considered to be secure in terms of conservation, but in some subspecies there are areas of concern in which the species is declining.

=== Habitat ===
Lichens typically grow in areas of high climatic stress, where many vascular plants cannot tolerate the conditions and survive. C. arbuscula is most commonly found growing on white or black spruce, but can be found on the ground in bogs or fens as well as growing on sunny rocks. Reindeer lichens require a small amount of soil in order to stay attached to their substrate, but rarely grow directly on soil due to their ability to absorb nutrients and water from the air. Other substrates that C. arbuscula can be found on include decaying organic material, raised peat, other coniferous or hardwood trees, and rely on lakeshore rocks. The species can be found growing in association with mosses in some cases, which is thought to help with their attachment to rocks or woody debris.The species is shade intolerant, and typically cannot grow in areas with 70% canopy cover or more. With the exception of populations in the Pacific Northwest, reindeer lichen grow dominantly in cool, dry sites. They avoid areas with standing water, and in areas of high moisture will grow in the driest microbiomes. C. arbuscula is more commonly found in moist areas when compared to other species in the genus, but still prefers dry, cool habitats for ideal growth. Reindeer lichens are rarely found at high elevations, and grow dominantly at low-middle elevations.

== Reproduction and growth ==
=== Asexual reproduction ===
C. arbuscula can reproduce both asexually and sexually. The asexual reproduction process can occur through fragmentation of the primary thallus in which a small portion of the thallus can regenerate a fully productive new thallus as long as the original portion contains both algal and fungal cells. Asexual spores known as conidia are produced on pycnidia borne at the edges of the podetia cups and are used to reproduce asexually via fragmentation. Due to the microscopic nature of these asexual reproductive elements, not many studies have been done to describe the in depth reproduction of C. arbuscula.

=== Sexual reproduction ===
Sexual reproduction in C. arbuscula is done through the production and release of ascospores. These sexual spores are contained in an ascus located at the tip of the podetia, and are dispersed via wind. This lichen does not disperse far from the parent organism, however, with an average dispersal distance of only around 8-10 inches in forest sites and no more than 30 inches in prairies and savannas. Lichen fragments can be dispersed from animals at longer distances, but this is not the main method used in reproduction and regeneration. Lichens reproduce sexually in one of two ways, heterothally or homothally, yet the obligate lifestyle of Cladonia species and many others makes studying the sexual reproductive cycle nearly impossible in a lab, and remains unknown for this species.

=== Growth ===
Most lichens are slow growing and have long life spans, particularly in the Cladonia species of reindeer lichen. Despite the overall slow process of growth, their lives can be broken down into three distinct sections of growth. The first stage of growth consists of the fastest increase in size, and is considered the growth accumulation period. The lichen grows larger in size every year without losing any parts of the podetium. This first stage typically lasts around 10 years, but depending on species and location can range from 6–25 years. Especially in areas disturbed by fire regimes, growth rates are on average 4.8 mm/year, but can reach up to 12 mm/year. The second period of growth is known as the renovation period, and while the podetium height continues to increase, internodes begin to decay and die at the base. This is the longest stage, lasting over 100 years in some cases. Finally, the withering period lasts around 10–20 years and consists of the decay of both the remaining internodes and the podetia.

Growth periods depend heavily on a multitude of outside factors, such as habitat, climate, amount of grazing, fire regimes, and substrate material. Growth rates appear to be highest in areas with high fire disturbance and high grazing, however the overall size of lichen in areas of high grazing were on smaller on average.

== Ecology ==
Cladonia arbuscula is a known host species for the fungus Lichenopeltella cladoniarum.

=== Interactions with other species ===
Cladonia arbuscula is a vital foodsource for caribou in the Northern hemisphere. Due to the lichen's ability to survive through cold, dry winters, they are a primary food source throughout winter for many caribou in North America. In Canada, the lichen make up around 50-90% of the caribou's diet (according to studies of caribou rumens). The fungi however can be damaged by large numbers of caribou due to overgrazing and trampling. Some small mammals such as voles and mice feed on these lichens in the winter as well. Despite the low protein levels of these lichen, especially in comparison with other vascular plants, they are the main food source for many animals, and if not protected can cause bottom-up trophic cascades with detrimental effects on caribou populations. Lichens themselves are photosymbionts, and consist of intermixing fungal, cyanobacteria, and algal layers working together to survive.

=== Fire ecology ===
Thallus fragments can travel from unburned areas to freshly burned ones and easily colonize the shadeless, dry terrain. In areas of recent burns, C. arbuscula growth rates increased substantially compared to areas without fire. While reindeer lichens can persist in the absence of fire, the decreased canopy cover and increased ground-layer biodiversity from frequent burns can significantly help lichens grow. Fire itself does kill reindeer lichen, but leads to more favorable conditions for growth post-fire. C. arbuscula is typically found in late primary successional stages, and in early-middle secondary successional stages. Caribou grazing and trampling can affect the diversity of lichen in an area by causing early and late successional staged species to grow simultaneously.

== Conservation ==
Despite the species being considered stable and secure globally, there are many threats facing C. arbuscula across the globe. These threats include pollution, fire suppression, and mountain pine beetles. C. arbuscula is extremely sensitive to pollution, and heavy metals and acids from factories or manufacturing facilities can travel miles and harm these lichen. The toxins build up in the lichens and inhibit growth and kill many organisms each year. Mountain pine beetles indirectly affect reindeer lichen as well due to their ability to cause large scale lodgepole pine death, a commonly used substrate for the lichen.
