= Heinrich Sandstede =

German lichenologist and local historian (1859–1951)

- Born: 10 March 1859; Bad Zwischenahn, Oldenburg, Germany
- Died: 5 March 1951 (aged 91)
- Scientific career
- Fields: Lichenology
- Author abbrev. (botany): Sandst.

Johann Heinrich Sandstede (10 March 1859 – 5 March 1951) was a German lichenologist and local historian who contributed to the study of lichens, particularly the genus Cladonia. Born in Bad Zwischenahn, Oldenburg, Sandstede initially worked as a baker before dedicating his career to botany and lichenology. He published extensive research on the lichen funga of Northwest Germany and the Frisian Islands, including a notable work on Cladonia in the Rabenhorst series. Sandstede's contributions to lichenology earned him recognition from scientific societies and an honorary doctorate from the University of Münster. Beyond his scientific work, he was active in preserving local history and folklore, contributing to the founding of the Freiland Museum and publishing on regional customs. Sandstede's dual interests in lichenology and local culture made him a significant figure in both scientific and cultural spheres of early 20th-century Germany.

== Early life and education ==
Sandstede's interest in nature and botany began in his youth, initially focusing on flowering plants and vascular cryptogams, and later expanding to mosses, liverworts, and lichens. In 1879, he met Franz Müller, a school director and moss specialist, with whom Sandstede began studying the flora of Oldenburg, eventually leading Sandstede to specialise in lichens.

== Lichenology career ==
Sandstede's research in lichenology was primarily focused on local habitats. He published his first report on the lichen funga of the lowlands of Northwest Germany in 1889. Over the years, he expanded his research to the Frisian Islands, Neuwerk, Rügen, and Heligoland. In 1931, he contributed a section on the genus Cladonia in the Rabenhorst series (Dr. L. Rabenhorst's Kryptogamen-Flora von Deutschland, Oesterreich und der Schweiz), followed by a phytogeographical study of Cladoniaceae in Die Pflanzenareale (1932–1939), edited by Hubert Winkler and Heinrich von Handel-Mazzetti.

Sandstede's work in the taxonomy of Cladonia was influenced by Edvard August Vainio's work Monographia Cladoniarum Universalis (1887–1898). With the introduction of Asahina's p-phenylenediamine tests in 1934 and simple microchemical methods, Sandstede applied these techniques to Vainio's system in his report "Erganzungen zu Wainio's Monographia 'Cladoniarum universalis' unter besonderer Berücksichtigung des Verhaltens der Cladonien zu Asahina's Diaminprobe" (1938).

From 1889 onwards, Sandstede focused primarily on lichenology. In 1912, at the age of 53, he began to work intensively with Cladonia. He published the first fascicle of his exsiccata Cladoniae exsiccatae in 1918, becoming a recognised expert in the genus alongside Vainio of Finland until the latter's death in 1929. Sandstede's exsiccata comprised 13 fascicles of 1886 species and forms, which he distributed to 50 museums, botanical institutes, and colleagues. He revised numerous Cladonia collections, including those at the Berlin-Dahlem Museum and the University of Geneva.

Sandstede's own herbarium, exclusive of Cladonia, was presented to the Museum of Bremen in 1912. He received honorary memberships in various scientific societies, including the Scientific Society of Natural Sciences of Bremen, the Society of Natural Sciences of Oldenburg, and the Botanical Society of Brandenburg. He was also granted the Acherson plaque for his research on the flora of Central Europe and received the Oldenburg Medal, 1st class, from Grand Elector Nikolaus Friedrich Peter for his studies on the lichens of Oldenburg. In 1930, on his 71st birthday, the University of Münster awarded Sandstede an honorary Doctor of Philosophy.

Sandstede's colleagues named six new lichen species after him: Verrucaria sandstedei B.de Lesd. (1912); Cladonia sandstedei Abbayes (1938); Stagonospora sandstedeana Keissl. (1925); Parmelia sandstedeana Gyeln. (1932); Diplodina sandstedei Zopf (1906); and Lecidea sandstedei Zwackh (1898).

== Local history and cultural contributions ==
Sandstede was involved in both natural sciences and local cultural activities. He studied local customs and folklore, devoting time to provincial activities. He assisted in founding the Freiland Museum (1909) and restoring the Ammerland Peasant Farm and an Oldenburg village. In 1927, during a festival in the village, the German President Paul von Hindenburg visited Sandstede.

Sandstede wrote extensively on local history and folklore, publishing numerous articles in local newspapers and periodicals. He was a member of the Society for Folk ways of Lower Saxony (Bremen), the Oldenburg Regional Society for History and Native Lore, and the Regional Union of Lower Saxony (Hannover) for his contributions in this field.

Sandstede maintained an interest in his former trade as a baker and wrote various stories published in a small trade journal, "The Bakers' Little Adviser". While some of his stories were light-hearted, others, such as "Bread Substitutes in Times of Famine" (1930), offered practical advice on using lichens as a food source during difficult times.

== Personal life ==
Heinrich Sandstede married Helene zu Klampers in 1885, but she died in 1911. The couple had two children, both of whom died in 1946 and 1947. Sandstede developed a friendship with Paul von Hindenburg, who became President of Germany after World War I. Sandstede visited Hindenburg many times in Berlin, and Hindenburg paid at least two visits to Sandstede in Oldenburg, including the festival visit in 1927 mentioned earlier. Sandstede died on 5 March 1951 in his hometown of Bad Zwischenahn. His work contributed significantly to the fields of lichenology, local history, and folklore.

== Selected works ==
Sandstede's first publication appeared in 1889, and he published nearly 40 scientific publications during his career. Some examples follow:

- Sandstede, H. (1889). "Beiträge zu einer Lichenenflora des nordwestdeutschen Tieflandes" [Contributions to a lichen flora of the north-west German lowlands]. Abhandlungen herausgegeben vom Naturwissenschaftlichen Verein zu Bremen (in German). 10: 439–480.
- —————— (1906). "Die Cladonien des nordwestdeutschen Tieflandes und der deutschen Nordseeinseln" [The Cladonia lichens of the northwest German lowlands and the German North Sea islands]. Abhandlungen des naturwissenschaftlichen Vereins Bremen (in German). 18: 384–456.
- —————— (1912). "Die Flechten des nordwestdeutschen Tieflandes und der deutschen Nordseeinseln" [The lichens of the northwest German lowlands and the German North Sea islands]. Abhandlungen des naturwissenschaftlichen Vereins Bremen (in German). 21: 9–243.
- —————— (1938). Ergänzungen zu Wainio's "Monographia Cladoniarum universalis" unter besonderer Berücksichtigung des Verhaltens der Cladonien zu Asasahina's Diaminprobe [Additions to Wainio's 'Monographia Cladoniarum universalis' with special consideration of the behaviour of Cladonia species in Asahina's diamine test]. Feddes Repertorium Specierum Novarum Regni Vegetabilis Beihefte (in German). Vol. 103. p. 103.
- —————— (1949). "Bemerkungen zu meiner "Flechten des norwestdeutschen Tieflandes und der deutschen Nordseeinseln"" [Remarks on my 'Lichens of the Northwest German Lowlands and the German North Sea Islands']. Veroffentl. Mus. für Natur-, Volker-, und Handelskunde in Bremnen. Reihe A (in German). 1: 5–40.

== See also ==
- Category:Taxa named by Heinrich Sandstede
