= Flörke =

Flörke is a German surname. Notable people with the surname include:

- Heinrich Gustav Flörke (1764–1835), German botanist and lichenologist
- Hermann Flörke (1893–1979), German Wehrmacht army general
- Randy Florke, American real estate and design executive
