= Barbatic acid =

Chemical compound found in some lichens

Names
- IUPAC name 2-Hydroxy-4-(2-hydroxy-4-methoxy-3,6-dimethylbenzoyl)oxy-3,6-dimethylbenzoic acid
- Other names Barbatinic acid

Identifiers
CAS Number	17636-16-7
3D model (JSmol)	Interactive image
ChEBI	CHEBI:144123
ChEMBL	ChEMBL1902081
ChemSpider	146680
PubChem CID	167666
CompTox Dashboard (EPA)	DTXSID40170115
- InChI: InChI=1S/C19H20O7/c1-8-7-13(11(4)16(20)14(8)18(22)23)26-19(24)15-9(2)6-12(25-5)10(3)17(15)21/h6-7,20-21H,1-5H3,(H,22,23) Key: NMKBRSYSHBPUPY-UHFFFAOYSA-N
- SMILES: CC1=CC(=C(C(=C1C(=O)OC2=C(C(=C(C(=C2)C)C(=O)O)O)C)O)C)OC

Properties
Chemical formula	C_{19}H_{20}O_{7}
Molar mass	360.362 g·mol^{−1}
Melting point	187 °C (369 °F; 460 K)
- Except where otherwise noted, data are given for materials in their standard state (at 25 °C [77 °F], 100 kPa). Infobox references

Barbatic acid is an organic compound that is made by some lichens. It is in the structural class known as depsides. It is particularly common in the genera Usnea (the beard lichens) and Cladonia.

== History ==
The compound was first isolated in 1880 from the lichen Usnea barbata by chemists John Stenhouse and Charles Groves. The compound coccellic acid, isolated from Cladonia coccifera, was later shown to be the same compound as barbatic acid.

== Properties ==
Biosynthetically, barbatic acid is made of two units of orsellinate derivatives that are created by an aromatic synthase enzyme. The repeated action of this enzyme produces an 8-carbon polyketide intermediate that is cyclized.

Barbatic acid's IUPAC name is 2-hydroxy-4-(2-hydroxy-4-methoxy-3,6-dimethylbenzoyl)oxy-3,6-dimethylbenzoic acid. Its chemical formula is C_{19}H_{20}O_{7}; it has a molecular mass of 360.36 grams per mole. In its purified crystalline form, it exists as various forms: small rhombic prisms, long needles, or delicate thin sheets (lamellae). Its melting point is 187 °C (369 °F).

The crystal structure of the methyl ester of barbatic acid (i.e., methyl 2-hydroxy-4-(2-hydrocy-4-methoxy-3,6-dimethylbenzoyloxy)-3,6-dimethylbenzoate, or barbatin) has been characterised. It is in the triclinic crystal system, in the space group called P1̅. In this crystal form, two highly substituted phenyl rings are bridged by an ester group and are inclined towards each other at 106.1°. There are two strong intramolecular hydrogen bonds between the hydroxyl substituents and the adjacent ester carbonyl groups. The crystal structure of pure barbatic acid, determined using single crystal X-ray diffraction analysis, was reported in 2019.

== Synthesis ==
A synthesis for barbatic acid was reported in 1975 using trifluoroacetic acid as a condensing agent. In 2022, a total synthesis was reported; the eight-step procedure starts with commercially available methyl atrarate, producing barbatic acid in a 22% total yield.

A high-performance liquid chromatography (HPLC) technique has been adapted to couple the HPLC output with a photodiode array detector to screen for lichen products based on their specific ultraviolet–visible spectra. In this way, barbatic acid is detected by monitoring its retention time, and verifying the presence of three peaks representing wavelengths of maximum absorption (λ_{max}) at 214, 276, and 310 nm.

== Research ==
Some preliminary research suggests that based on the in vitro molluscicidal activity of barbatic acid against the human parasite Schistosoma mansoni, it may have potential use in the large-scale control and/or eradication of schistosomiasis. Other research has shown that it is non-toxic to human peripheral blood mononuclear cells at concentrations that are effective against the parasite. Barbatic acid inhibits photosynthesis by irreversible binding to the proteins in the photosystem II complex.

Immobilised cells of the lichen Cladonia miniata var. parvipes have been used to synthesise barbatic acid. The cells were given sodium acetate or calcium acetate as a precursor for phenol biosynthesis.

Laboratory experiments have demonstrated that barbatic acid has some antioxidant and antimicrobial activity. It has cytotoxic and genotoxic activity against some tumour cell lines. And in vitro and in vivo experiments using various cancer cell lines suggest that barbatic acid has antineoplastic and pro-apoptotic activities combined with a low toxicity.
