= Podetium =

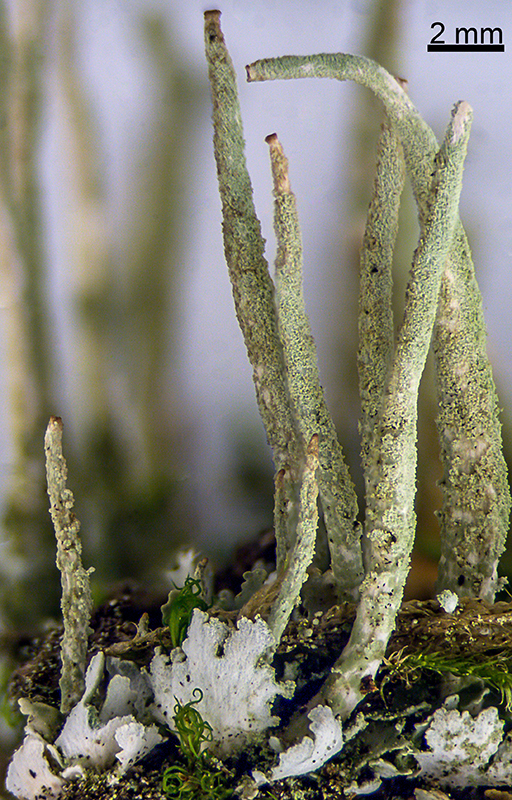
Podetia rising up from the primary thallus of Cladonia coniocraea

A podetium (plural: podetia) is the upright secondary thallus in Cladonia lichens. It is a hollow stalk extending from the primary thallus. Podetia can be pointed stalks, club like, cupped, or branched in shape and may or may not contain the ascocarp, the fruiting body, of the lichen. It is not considered part of the primary thallus as it is a fruiting structure for reproduction. A lichen can be described as "podetiate" when it forms a podetium.

== Structure and development ==
Podetia are unique expanded structures produced at the tips of the primary thallus in Cladonia. They are produced in three sections of Cladonia: true scyphi, verticillate podetia, and funnel-like structures. The development of podetia is highly variable, with growth rates depending on species and environmental conditions. Annual growth typically ranges from 1 to 15 mm.

True scyphi are goblet-like structures that are closed or rarely secondarily perforated at the bottom. They usually produce numerous conidiomata along their margins and, later, apothecia or hymenial disks. Scyphi may also produce vegetative secondary branchlets from their margins or centers.

Verticillate podetia feature centrally proliferating scyphi forming conspicuous configurations characteristic of many species in Cladonia sect. Cladonia. Funnels, or open cups, are trumpet-like structures with a central opening at the tip or axis of the podetium.

== Taxonomic significance ==
The configurations of podetia are highly variable, ranging from simple unbranched to complex, densely branched patterns, offering many useful taxonomic characters. Several branching patterns are recognized in Cladonia:

- Dichotomous branching: One, two, three, or many branches produced from the same place
- Isotomous branching: Branches equal in length and thickness
- Anisotomous branching: Branches unequal in length and thickness

In Cladonia, "regular" branching patterns have been recognized, although in boreal species, regular branching correlates with seasonal climates. Species of Cladina normally ramify once a year, following a dominant pattern such as anisotomic trichotomy or isototomic tetrachotomy.

The axis of the branching podetia is taxonomically useful. Open axils are perforated, either from the production of the first branches or in later development. Primary perforations differ from secondary ones that are mechanically produced by irregular growth.
