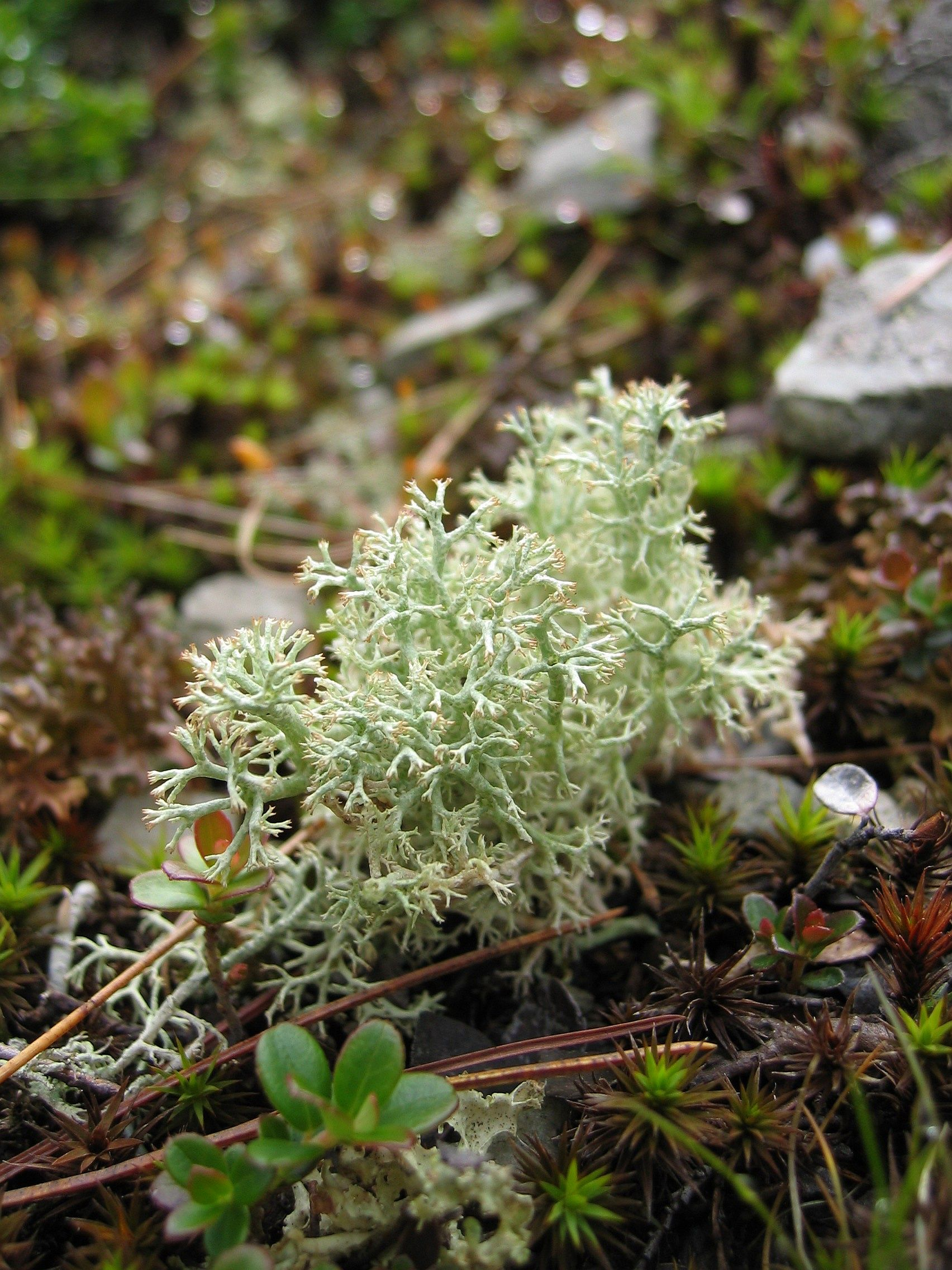
- Cladonia portentosa

Scientific classification
- Kingdom: Fungi
- Division: Ascomycota
- Class: Lecanoromycetes
- Order: Lecanorales
- Family: Cladoniaceae
- Genus: Cladonia; P.Browne (1756)

Type species
- Cladonia subulata (L.) Weber ex F.H.Wigg. (1780)

Species
- See List of Cladonia species

Synonyms
- Verrucaster Tobler (1912)

= Cladonia =

Genus of lichenised fungi

Cladonia is a genus of lichenized fungi in the family Cladoniaceae. They are the primary food source for reindeer/caribou. Cladonia species are of economic importance to reindeer-herders, such as the Sami in Scandinavia or the Nenets in Russia. Antibiotic compounds are extracted from some species to create antibiotic cream. The light green species Cladonia stellaris is used in flower decorations.

Although the phylogeny of the genus Cladonia is still under investigation, two main morphological groups are commonly differentiated by taxonomists: the Cladonia morpho-type and the Cladina morpho-type. The Cladonia morpho-type has many more species, and is generally described as a group of squamulose (grow from squamules), cup-bearing lichens. The Cladina morpho-types are often referred to as forage lichens, mat-forming lichens, or reindeer lichens (due to their importance as caribou winter forage).

Cladonia perforata ("perforate cladonia") is one of two on the U.S. Endangered Species List, and it should never be collected. It exists only in a few small populations in Florida.

Several Cladonia species grow on sand dunes. The presence, and luxuriant carpet-like growth, of Cladonia species is one of the defining characters of grey dunes, a priority habitat for conservation under the E.U. Habitats Directive.

Larvae of some Lepidoptera species, including Chionodes continuella, feed on Cladonia species.

== Selected species ==
Selected species of Cladonia include:

- Cladonia amaurocraea – quill lichen
- Cladonia arbuscula – reindeer lichens
- Cladonia asahinae – pixie cup lichen
- Cladonia borealis – boreal cup lichen
- Cladonia cariosa – split-leg lichen
- Cladonia cenotea – powdered funnel lichen
- Cladonia chlorophaea – mealy pixie cup
- Cladonia coccifera – madam's cup
- Cladonia coniocraea – common powderhorn
- Cladonia cristatella – British soldiers lichen
- Cladonia deformis – lesser sulphur-cup lichen
- Cladonia didyma – Southern soldiers
- Cladonia fimbriata – trumpet lichen
- Cladonia gracilis – smooth horn lichen
- Cladonia macilenta – lipstick powderhorn
- Cladonia macrophyllodes – large-leaved cladonia
- Cladonia mitis – green reindeer lichen, yellow reindeer lichen
- Cladonia mongkolsukii
- Cladonia multiformis – sieve lichen
- Cladonia parasitica
- Cladonia peziziformis – cup lichen
- Cladonia phyllophora – felt horn lichen
- Cladonia pleurota – red-fruited pixie cup
- Cladonia portentosa – reindeer lichen
- Cladonia pyxidata – pebbled pixie lichen
- Cladonia rangiferina – grey reindeer lichen, true reindeer lichen
- Cladonia rei – wand lichen
- Cladonia squamosa – dragon horn
- Cladonia stellaris – northern reindeer lichen, star-tipped reindeer lichen
- Cladonia turgida – crazy scale lichen
- Cladonia uncialis – thorn lichen
- Cladonia verticillata – ladder lichen

== Gallery ==
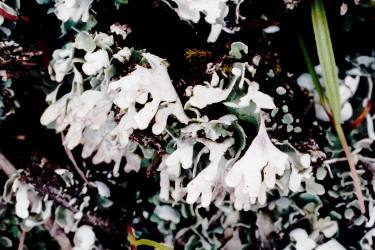
Cladonia apodocarpa

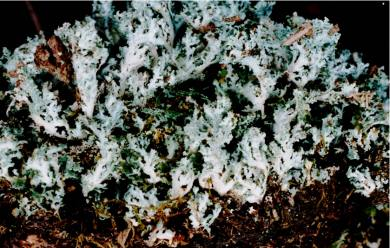
Cladonia caespiticia

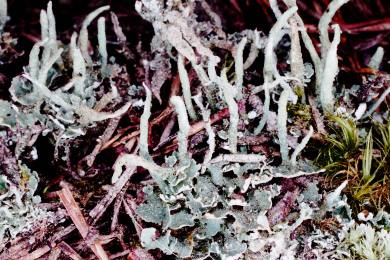
Cladonia coniocraea – common powderhorn

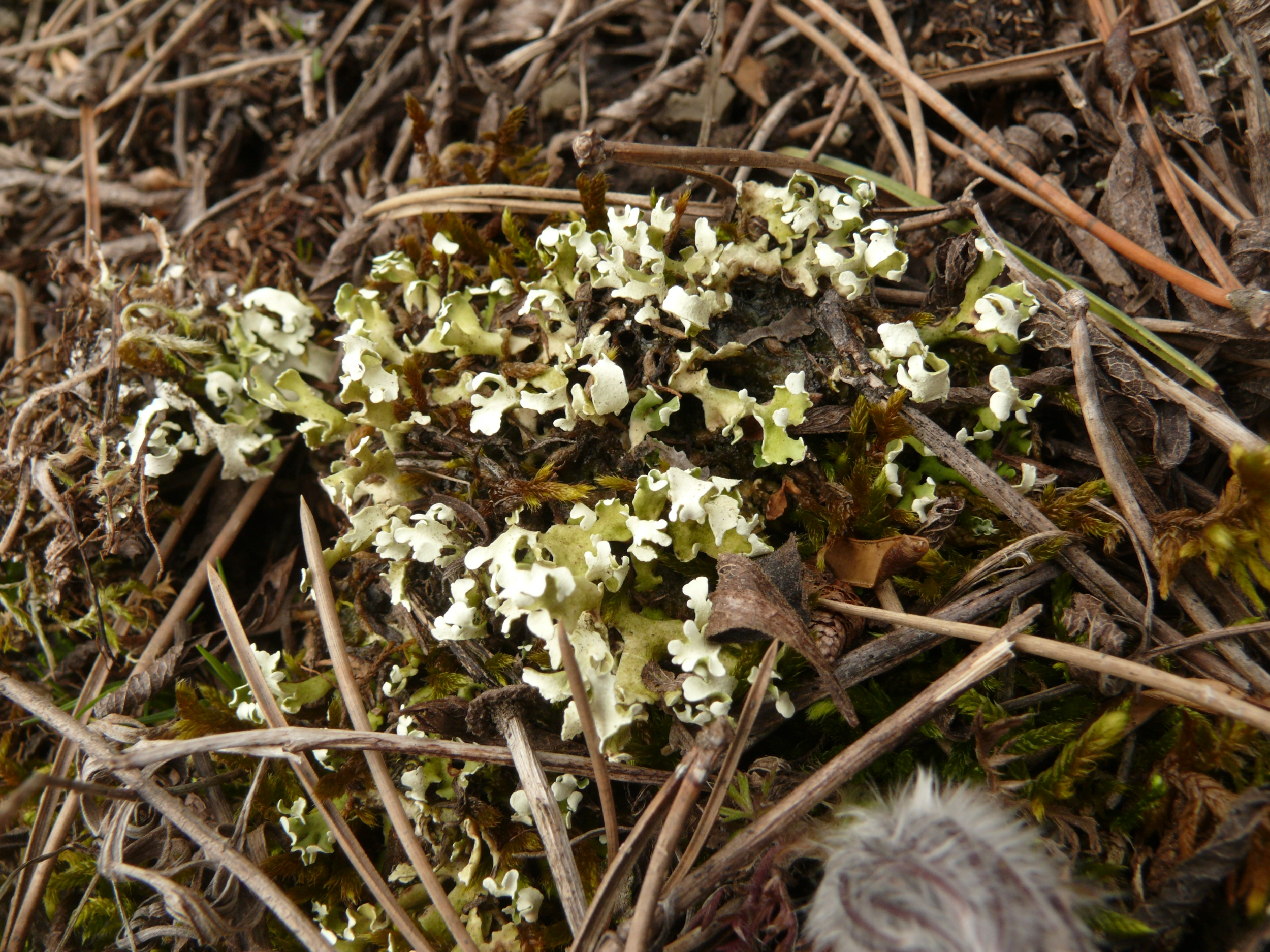
Cladonia convoluta

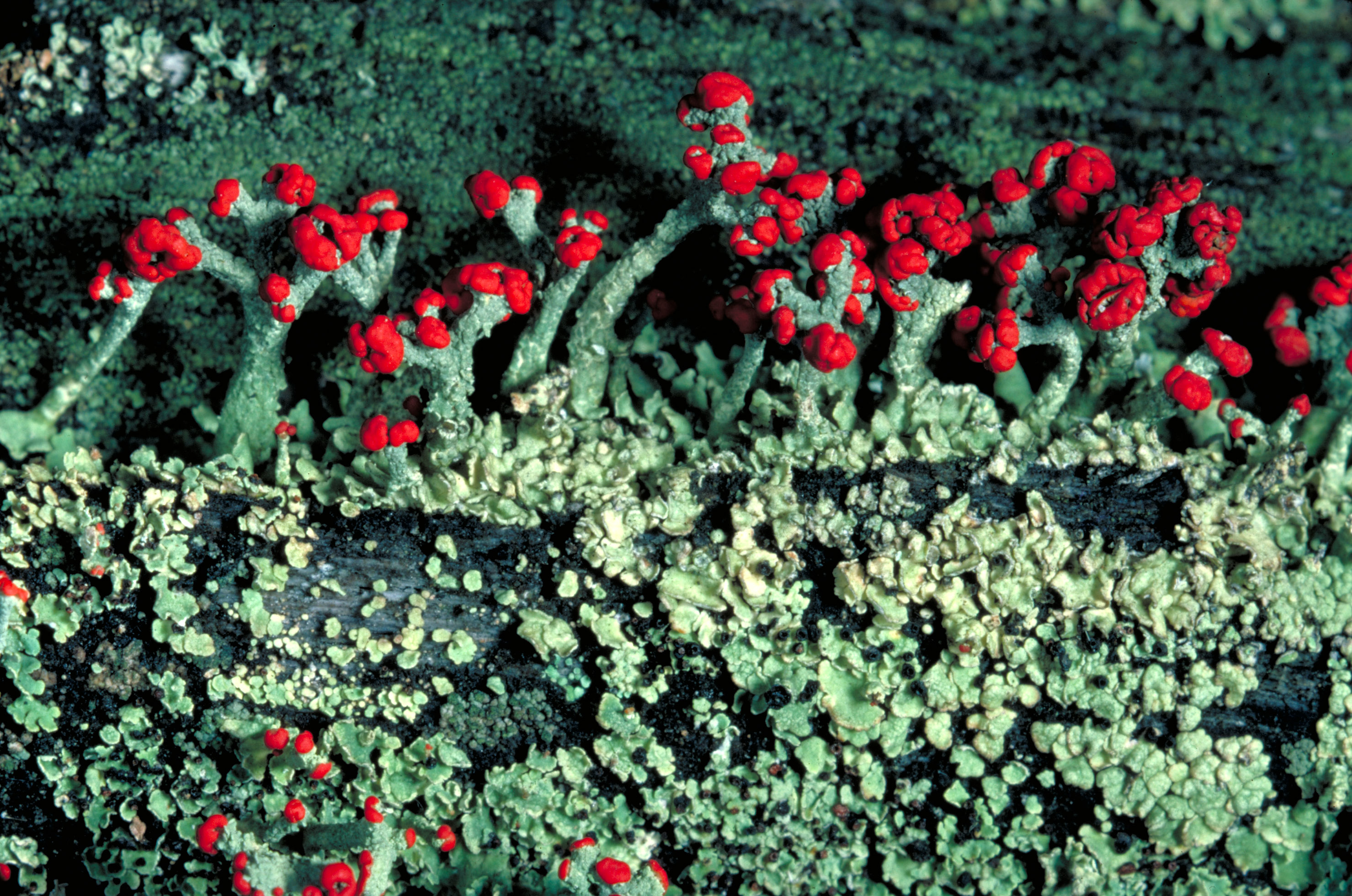
Cladonia cristatella – British soldiers

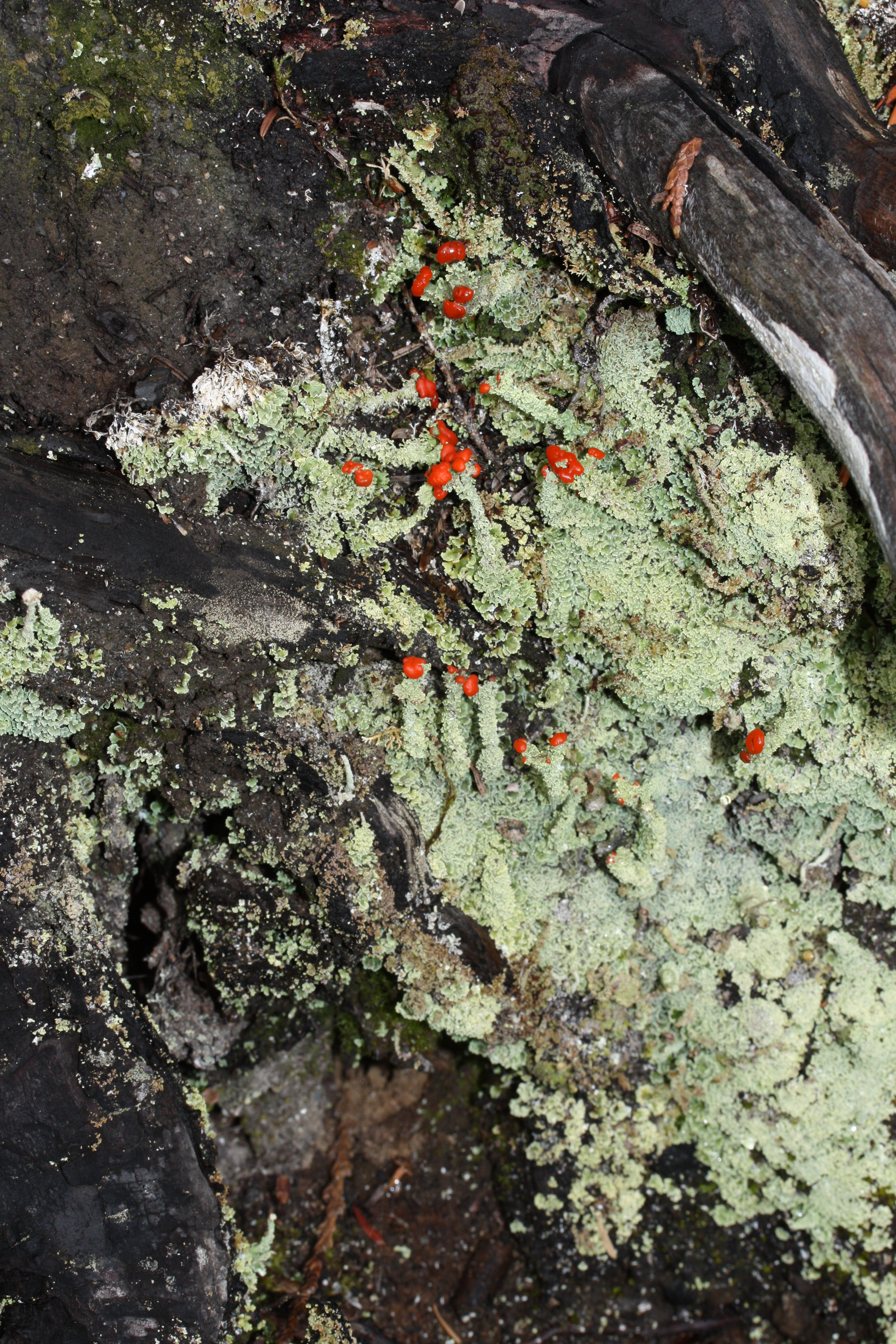
Cladonia macilenta var. bacillaris – lipstick cladonia

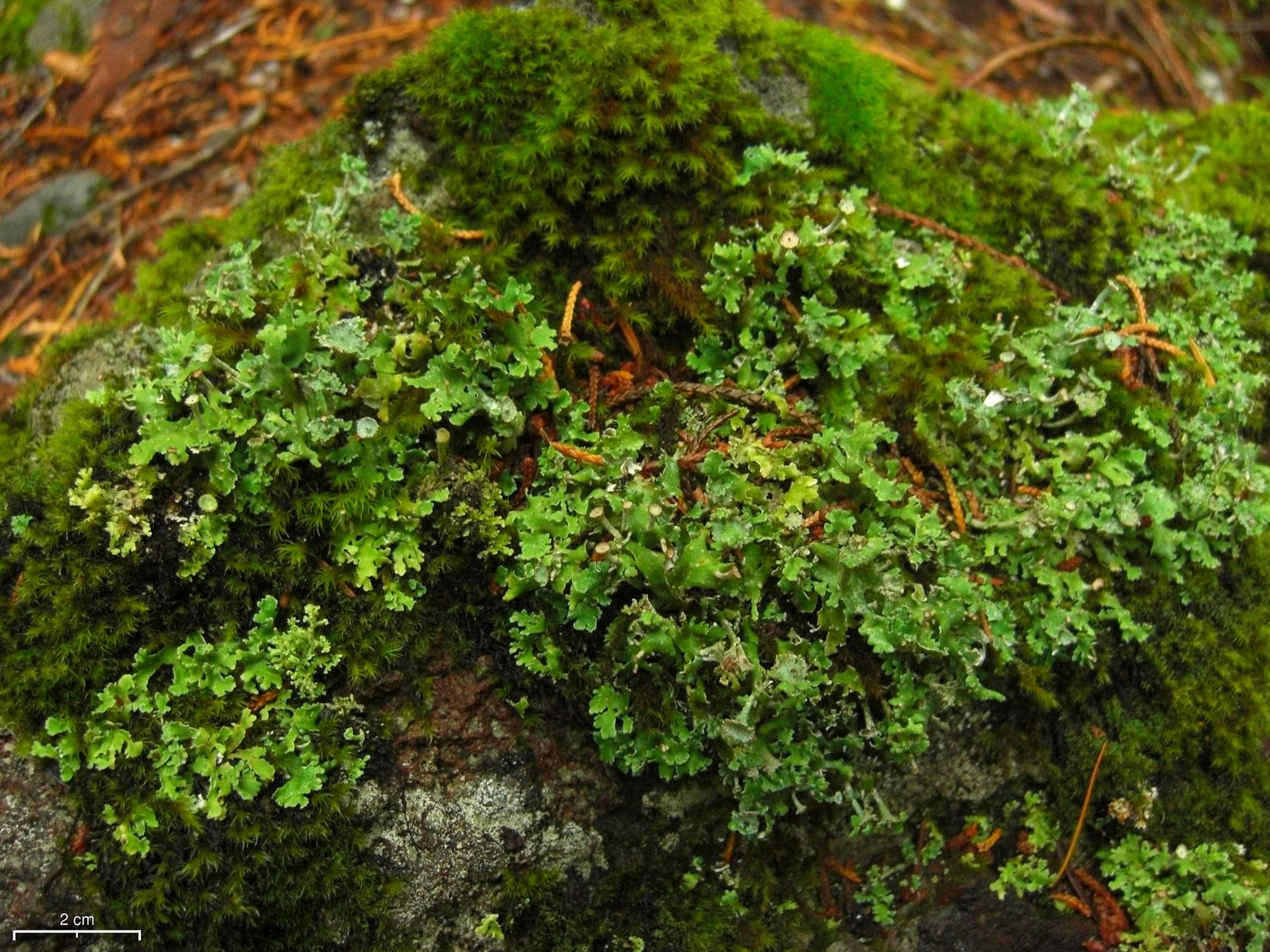
Cladonia macrophyllodes – large-leaved cladonia

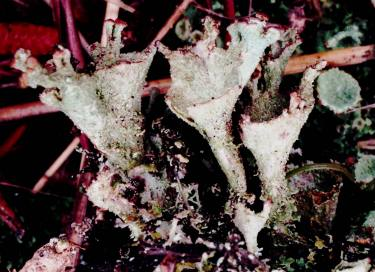
Cladonia grayi complex

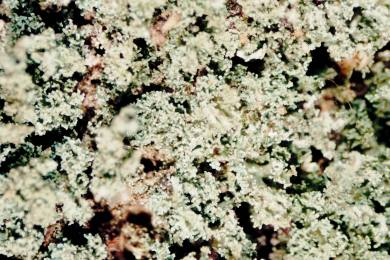
Cladonia parasitica

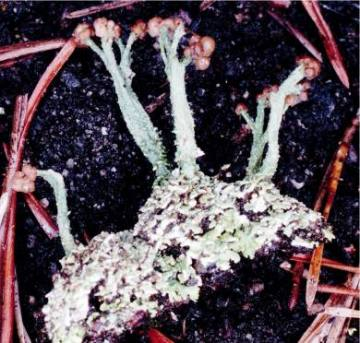
Cladonia peziziformis

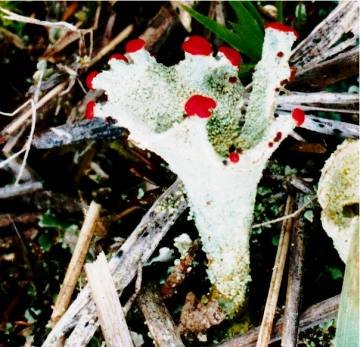
Cladonia pleurota – red-fruited pixie cup

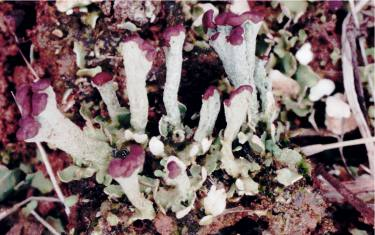
Cladonia subcariosa

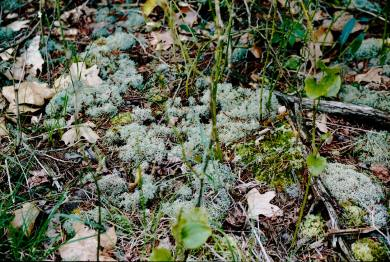
Cladonia subtenuis
