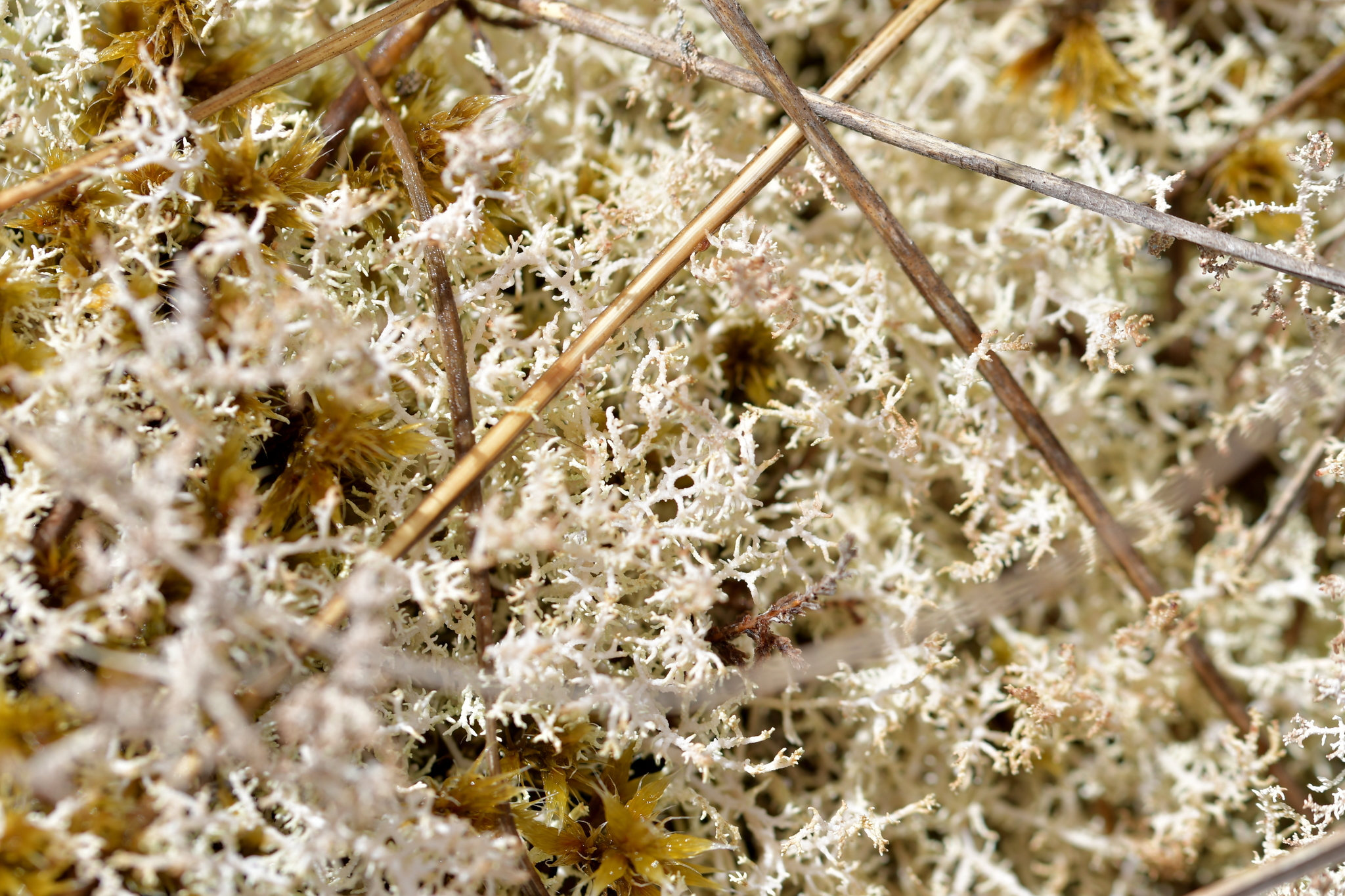
- Leifidium tenerum

Scientific classification
- Domain: Eukaryota
- Kingdom: Fungi
- Division: Ascomycota
- Class: Lecanoromycetes
- Order: Lecanorales
- Family: Sphaerophoraceae
- Genus: Leifidium; Wedin (1993)
- Species: L. tenerum

Binomial name
- Leifidium tenerum Wedin (1993)

= Leifidium =

Single-species lichen genus

Leifidium is a fungal genus the family Sphaerophoraceae. The genus is monotypic, containing the single species Leifidium tenerum, a fruticose lichen. This lichen forms pale grey to whitish cushions made up of thin, flexible branches that divide repeatedly. It reproduces through small fruiting structures at branch tips that release powdery spore masses when mature. The species grows in diverse Southern Hemisphere environments, from cool rainforests to alpine areas, spanning from Chile and New Zealand to Australia and subantarctic islands.

== Taxonomy ==
Leifidium is a small lichen genus in the family Sphaerophoraceae. It was erected by Mats Wedin in 1993 on the back of a cladistic study that split the old catch-all genus Sphaerophorus into three, recognising Leifidium alongside Sphaerophorus in the strict sense (sensu stricto) and Bunodophoron. The genus is monospecific: its type—and only—species is Leifidium tenerum. This lichen was originally described as Sphaerophorus tener by Laurer in 1827. The genus is named in honour of the Swedish lichenologist Leif Tibell.

Phylogenetically, Leifidium groups most closely with Bunodophoron; together they form a single branch within the family, united by a shared style of spore "icing" (a thin coating deposited after the spores leave the asci). Leifidium is set apart by a thin outer skin or cortex, and by branch-tip fruiting cups whose rigid rim (excipulum) stays intact until the spores mature, then pops off like a cap. Its spherical spores bear little surface ornamentation, and its asexual spores (conidia) are short, oval bodies—not the rod-shaped type seen in Bunodophoron.

== Description ==
Leifidium produces a pale grey-to-whitish thallus made up of very slender, round (terete) branches that divide repeatedly to form loose cushions or low mats on the substrate. Each branch is sheathed in an exceptionally thin cortex only about 30–45 μm thick—just two or three cell layers—so the branches remain flexible and often appear translucent at the tips. Beneath this skin lies a dense medulla of tightly packed fungal threads (hyphae). The combination of a thread-like, cushion-forming habit and the wafer-thin cortex readily separates Leifidium from its close relative Bunodophoron, whose branches are flatter and more thickly corticate.

Reproductive structures sit at the very tips of stouter, upright side-branches. Each apothecium begins its development hidden beneath a cup-like wall (excipulum); when the spores are ripe this wall detaches in one piece "like lifting off a cap", exposing a powdery spore mass (the mazaedium) that faces upward. The spores themselves are tiny, almost smooth, globe-shaped bodies (6.5–8.5 μm in diameter) that start colourless and become faintly bluish-grey in alkaline solutions; any delicate surface ornament quickly dissolves in chemical tests. Minute flask-shaped pycnidia dot the branch tips, lining them with branched filaments that bud off single-celled, broadly ellipsoidal conidia about 3–4 × 1.5–2 μm. Chemical analyses show the presence of the compound sphaerophorin, together with minor, unidentified secondary metabolites.

Although Leifidium is sometimes somewhat similar in appearance to certain species of Cladia or Cladonia, it can be distinguished by its solid thallus, as those genera have hollow branch structures.

== Habitat and distribution ==
Leifidium tenerum tolerates a broad range of Southern Hemisphere habitats, growing on alpine and subantarctic soil or rock as well as on the bark and twigs of trees, tree ferns, lianas and bamboo in cool-temperate rainforests. It is most vigorous in moist, well-lit sites; fertile branches become common at higher elevations and rainfall levels, while at low altitudes apothecia are typically produced beside spray zones near waterfalls. The species spans the southern temperate belt, from Cape Horn north to Temuco in Chile, through New Zealand, from Tasmania to central New South Wales in Australia, and across several subantarctic islands.
