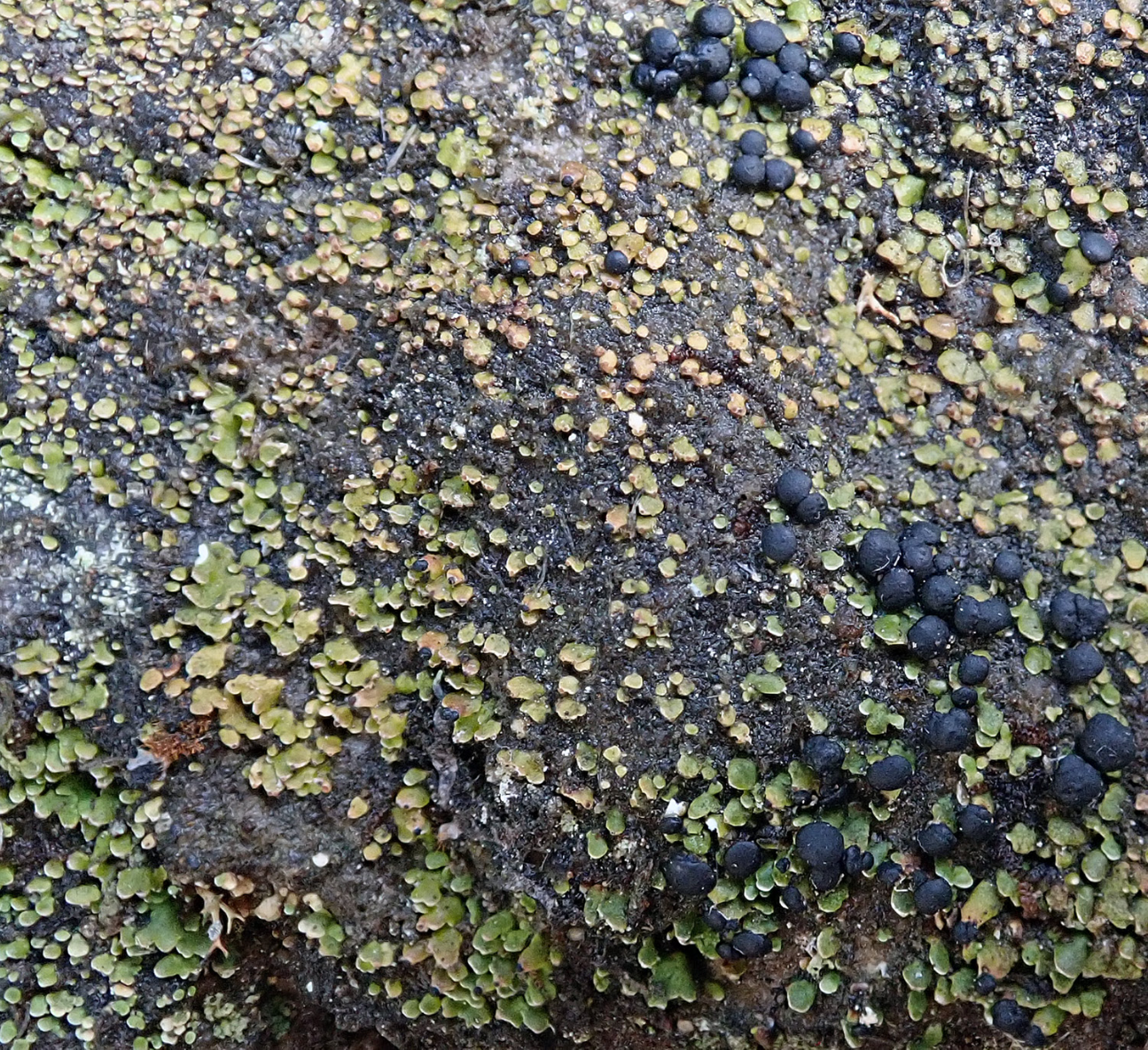
- Neophyllis pachyphylla

Scientific classification
- Domain: Eukaryota
- Kingdom: Fungi
- Division: Ascomycota
- Class: Lecanoromycetes
- Order: Lecanorales
- Family: Sphaerophoraceae
- Genus: Neophyllis; F.Wilson (1891)

Type species
- Neophyllis melacarpa F.Wilson (1891)

Species
- N. melacarpa N. pachyphylla

= Neophyllis =

Genus of lichen-forming fungi

Neophyllis a small genus of lichen-forming fungi in the family Sphaerophoraceae. The genus is endemic to Australasia, occurring in southeastern Australia, Tasmania and New Zealand. It comprises two recognised species characterised by small, leaf-like structures (squamules) and black, spherical spore-producing structures (apothecia). The more common and widespread species, N. melacarpa, typically grows on rotting wood and soil in various forest and heathland habitats, while the rarer N. pachyphylla is found mainly on granite and sandstone substrates. First proposed in 1889 as Phyllis and renamed in 1891, the genus was historically classified within the Cladoniaceae before being transferred to Sphaerophoraceae based on molecular evidence in the late 1990s.

== Taxonomy ==
The genus Neophyllis (family Sphaerophoraceae) was established in 1891 after Wilson initially described the type species in the genus Phyllis in 1889. In his original 1889 description of what would become Neophyllis, Wilson recognised its similarity to Cladonia lichens in its thallus structure, spores, and round fruiting bodies (apothecia), but noted several distinctive features that warranted a new genus. These included its uniquely double-convex squamules that became almost cylindrical at their tips, black apothecia positioned near the ends of branches, and distinct microscopic features of its paraphyses (sterile cells among the spore-producing structures). Wilson initially placed the genus between Cladina and Pycnothelia in Nylander's classification system.

Because the name Phyllis was already in use for a genus of flowering plants in the family Rubiaceae, Wilson created the new genus Neophyllis to accommodate these lichens. The genus remained classified within Cladoniaceae for many years, even as species were transferred between various genera including Phyllopsora and Gymnoderma. It wasn't until molecular studies in the late 1990s that Neophyllis, along with another Australasian endemic genus Austropeltum, was transferred to the family Sphaerophoraceae based on both ontogenetic and molecular evidence

The genus comprises two recognised species:

- Neophyllis melacarpa (F.Wilson) F.Wilson – The type species, first described as Phyllis melacarpa F.Wilson. This is the more common and widespread species.
- Neophyllis pachyphylla (Müll.Arg.) Gotth.Schneid. – Originally described as Psora pachyphylla Müll.Arg. in 1887, and later transferred to Neophyllis by Schneider in 1979.

While historically these species were distinguished primarily by morphological features and habitat preferences, modern taxonomic treatment recognizes them as chemically distinct taxa. N. melacarpa consistently contains grayanic acid (often with additional melacarpic and fumarprotocetraric acids), while N. pachyphylla contains only melacarpic acid as its major compound. Morphological differences between the species are also now well-established, with N. pachyphylla typically having more robust and dispersed squamules compared to the more delicate and often caespitose growth form of N. melacarpa.

Some specimens from New Zealand containing only melacarpic acid may represent an additional, currently undescribed species within the genus, though further research is needed to confirm this taxonomic interpretation.

== Description ==
Neophyllis species are distinctive lichens characterised by their small, leaf-like structures (called squamules) and black, spherical spore-producing structures (apothecia). The squamules can range from flat and elongated to more cylindrical and coral-like in form, typically appearing bright green to olive-coloured when wet, and shifting to yellowish-green or brownish when dry, often with a glossy surface.

The genus has several distinctive microscopic features that set it apart from other lichens. It contains a green algal partner (photobiont) with round cells measuring 7–11 micrometres (μm) in diameter. The spore-producing structures (asci) contain specialised cells that produce eight spores each and have a unique internal structure that helps identify the genus. These spores are transparent, elliptical in shape, and lack a gelatinous outer coating.

The two species in the genus can be distinguished from each other both by their appearance and their chemistry. N. melacarpa, the more common species, typically forms extensive colonies that can spread over several square metres. Its squamules are relatively delicate and often develop finger-like projections that are very brittle. In sun-exposed locations, it can form dense cushions of upright, cylindrical lobes. The species produces a chemical compound called grayanic acid, often alongside other related substances.

Neophyllis pachyphylla, in contrast, tends to be more robust in appearance. Its squamules are thicker and more scattered, often resembling small tongues with slightly thickened, rounded tips. While it can also develop cylindrical projections, these never dominate the overall appearance of the lichen as they do in N. melacarpa. This species is chemically distinct, producing only melacarpic acid as its main compound.

Both species produce black, globe-shaped apothecia that can reach up to 1.5 mm in width. These reproductive structures either nestle among the squamules or are elevated above them on short stalks. When viewed under a microscope, these structures contain a dark chocolate-brown layer at their surface and produce transparent spores that are crucial for species identification.

== Habitat and distribution ==
Neophyllis is a distinctly Australasian genus, occurring in southeastern Australia, Tasmania, and New Zealand. The distribution and habitat preferences of its two recognised species differ distinctly. N. melacarpa is common and widespread throughout its range, showing considerable ecological versatility. It occurs across a variety of vegetation communities including rainforest, sclerophyll forest, woodland, and heathland. In shaded forest environments, it typically grows on wood, particularly favouring rotting logs, buttresses and stumps of old eucalypts, as well as the trunks of Nothofagus and Athrotaxis trees that provide soft, moisture-retaining substrates. In more exposed, sunny locations, particularly in high-rainfall areas of western and southwestern Tasmania, the species can be found growing on soil in various settings, including crevices of quartzitic boulders, buttongrass (Gymnoschoenus sphaerocephalus) moorland, alpine or subalpine heathland, and coastal granite outcrops. It has also been documented on Triassic sandstone formations in southeastern Tasmania.

In contrast, N. pachyphylla is considerably rarer and has been documented from only a few regions: the Grampians in Victoria, parts of eastern Tasmania, and the Southern Tablelands of New South Wales. Unlike its more common relative, N. pachyphylla is more substrate-specific. It occurs primarily on Devonian granite in Tasmania and on coarse sandy or gravelly soil over granite or sandstone in other locations. The species shows a particular preference for shaded rocks subject to moisture seepage and areas where silt accumulates in drainage channels on large rock outcrops. While N. melacarpa frequently occurs on wood, N. pachyphylla has never been observed on woody substrates.
