= Bunodophoron pinnatum =

Scientific classification
- Kingdom: Fungi
- Division: Ascomycota
- Class: Lecanoromycetes
- Order: Lecanorales
- Family: Sphaerophoraceae
- Genus: Bunodophoron
- Species: B. pinnatum

Binomial name
- Bunodophoron pinnatum Wedin (2011)

Species of lichen

Bunodophoron pinnatum is a species of lichen in the family Sphaerophoraceae. Found in the Northern Province of Papua New Guinea, it was described as new to science in 2011 by lichenologist Mats Wedin. Its distinct elongated thallus and small brown ascospores set it apart from other similar lichen species.

== Taxonomy ==
Bunodophoron pinnatum was first formally described by Swedish lichenologist Mats Wedin as a new species in 2011. The species epithet pinnatum is derived from the Latin word for "feathered" and refers to the pinnate branching pattern of the thallus. The type specimen was collected in 1988 from English Peaks in the Northern Province of Papua New Guinea, at 3,600 m (11,800 ft) above sea level.

== Description ==
The thallus of Bunodophoron pinnatum is elongated and narrow, reaching up to 7 cm (2.8 in) in length. Its fertile branches are narrowly flattened to almost cylindrical, ranging from 30 to 50 mm long and 1 to 2 mm wide. The major branches are sparingly branched but typically have numerous, perpendicular, cylindrical branchlets along the sides.

The upper surface of the thallus is pale gray to white, with a smooth or rugose texture that may appear slightly wrinkled above the apothecia. The lower surface is white. The ascomata are sparse and terminal, measuring 2 to 4 mm wide. The ascospores are more or less spherical, 6.5 to 7.5 μm in diameter, greyish-brown, and have an irregular ornamentation of mazaedial material.

Bunodophoron pinnatum can be distinguished from other species in the genus by its almost cylindrical main branches, unique pinnate branching pattern, and comparatively small, brown ascospores. Additionally, it contains sphaerophorin and protocetraric acid, which are lichen products that are relatively rare in tropical species.

== Habitat and distribution ==
Bunodophoron pinnatum has been found in only three localities in the Northern Province of Papua New Guinea. According to the available data, it grows on the trunks of Dacrycarpus trees in stunted, Dacrycarpus-dominated forests around Mount Kenevi.
