= Bunodophoron crespoae =

Scientific classification
- Kingdom: Fungi
- Division: Ascomycota
- Class: Lecanoromycetes
- Order: Lecanorales
- Family: Sphaerophoraceae
- Genus: Bunodophoron
- Species: B. crespoae

Binomial name
- Bunodophoron crespoae Soto, M.Prieto & Wedin (2018)

Species of lichen

Bunodophoron crespoae is a species of ground-dwelling, fruticose lichen in the family Sphaerophoraceae. It is found in the Páramo of south-east Colombia, growing in association with moss.

== Taxonomy ==
The lichen was formally described as a new species in 2018 by Edier Soto Medina, Maria Prieto, and Mats Wedin. The type specimen was collected from the high-altitude páramo ecosystem of Gabriel López in Cauca, Colombia. It was found at an elevation of 3,200 m (10,500 ft), growing on the ground alongside Sphagnum moss. The species epithet honours the Spanish lichenologist Ana Crespo.

== Description ==
The lichen, described as "large and eye-catching" by the authors, grow whitish, flattened branches that are 10–13 cm (3.9–5.1 in) long. The ascomata (spore-bearing structures) are sparse, usually occurring at the ends of the branches. They measure 0.8–2.2 mm wide. Ascospores are pale greyish to dark grey and have typical dimensions of 4.5 by 6.3 μm. Pycnidia are common, and occur at the tips of the small terminal branches (branchlets). Sphaerophorin, stictic acid, and constictic acid are lichen products that occur in this species.

== Habitat and distribution ==
Bunodophoron crespoae is known to occur only from a few páramo areas in the south-east of Colombia, where it typically grows on the ground among mosses and Cladonia lichens in somewhat sun-exposed areas.
