= Calycidium =

Scientific classification
- Kingdom: Fungi
- Division: Ascomycota
- Class: Lecanoromycetes
- Order: Lecanorales
- Family: Sphaerophoraceae
- Genus: Calycidium; Stirt. (1877)

Type species
- Calycidium cuneatum Stirt. (1877)

Species
- C. cuneatum C. polycarpum

Synonyms
- Calycidiomyces Cif. & Tomas. (1953); Coniophyllum Müll.Arg. (1892)

Genus of lichen

Calycidium is a genus of lichen-forming fungi in the family Sphaerophoraceae. It has two species. It is one of the few lichen genera containing foliose (leafy) species that produce a mazaedium – a powdery mass of spores. Both species occur in Australasia and South America, where they grow on tree bark or on mosses.

== Taxonomy ==
The genus was circumscribed by James Stirton in 1877, with Calycidium cuneatum as the type species. Calycidium polycarpum was transferred to the genus (from Sphaerophorus) in 2002.

In 1929, Alexander Elenkin created the monotypic family Calycidiaceae to contain this genus. Phylogenetic analysis published in 2013 demonstrated that the Calycidiaceae were closely related to the Sphaerophoraceae. This family was subsumed into the Sphaerophoraceae by Robert Lücking and colleagues in their 2016 classification of lichenized fungi; they reasoned: "there is neither a topological nor a morphological reason to maintain the two families, even if both entities are reciprocally monophyletic and Calycidiaceae has been used for many decades".

== Description ==
Calycidium lichens have a more or less smooth, green to brownish-green foliose thallus. The thallus undersurface is white and wrinkled, and the medulla is white. The apothecia are located on the margin of the thallus. They bear the spore mass, the mazaedia, which are brown, comprising more or less spherical ascospores. Secondary chemicals produced by the genus include xanthones and the orcinol depside compound sphaerophorin.

== Species ==
- Calycidium cuneatum Stirt. (1877) – Australia (Tasmania); New Zealand
- Calycidium polycarpum (Colenso) Wedin (2002) – South America (Argentina and Chile); Australia (Tasmania); New Zealand

Both species occur in cool temperate rainforests of the Southern Hemisphere, where they grow on tree bark and sometimes over mosses.
