= Gilbertaria =

Scientific classification
- Domain: Eukaryota
- Kingdom: Fungi
- Division: Ascomycota
- Class: Lecanoromycetes
- Order: Lecanorales
- Family: Sphaerophoraceae
- Genus: Gilbertaria; M.Svensson & Fryday (2022)

Type species
- Gilbertaria contristans (Nyl.) M.Svensson & Fryday (2022)

Species
- G. astrapeana G. contristans G. holomeloides G. squalescens

Genus of lichens

Gilbertaria is a genus of lichen-forming fungi in the family Sphaerophoraceae, comprising four species of crustose lichens found primarily in arctic and alpine environments. The genus is characterised by its thin, crust-like growth on rocks and dead plant material, black button-like reproductive structures (apothecia), and frequent association with blue-green algae of the genus Stigonema. Molecular studies published in 2022 revealed that several previously misunderstood species, formerly classified in different genera, formed a distinct evolutionary lineage. The genus is unique within its family as the only member with a crustose growth form, and is named in honour of the British lichenologist Oliver Gilbert. Most species occur in the Northern Hemisphere, particularly in areas where snow persists late into the growing season, with one species known from the Falkland Islands.

== Taxonomy ==
The genus Gilbertaria was circumscribed in 2022 by Måns Svensson and Alan Fryday, who demonstrated through molecular phylogenetics analysis that several previously misunderstood lichen species formed a distinct evolutionary lineage within the family Sphaerophoraceae. The type species of the genus is Gilbertaria contristans, which was originally described as Lecidea contristans by William Nylander in 1865. Prior to the establishment of Gilbertaria, the species now placed in this genus had been variously classified under different genera including Catillaria, Lecidea, and Toninia, reflecting the historical uncertainty about their relationships.

The placement of Gilbertaria within the Sphaerophoraceae was initially surprising to researchers, as it is the only crustose genus in a family otherwise characterised by more complex growth forms. While other members of the family typically produce spores in specialised mazaedia (spore masses) and have different types of reproductive structures, Gilbertaria species have evolved a simpler form while retaining their evolutionary relationship to the family. The genus name combines "Gilbert-" (honouring the British lichenologist Oliver Gilbert) with "-aria" from Catillaria, one of the genera where some of these species were previously classified.

== Description ==
Gilbertaria is a genus of crustose lichens that forms thin, crust-like growths on rocks and dead plant material. The lichen's main body (thallus) varies between species, from barely visible films to well-developed grey crusts made up of small granules or warty bumps. In rare cases, some species may develop small, round structures called soralia that help with reproduction.

A distinctive feature of all Gilbertaria species is their black, button-like reproductive structures (apothecia) that range from 0.2 to 1.5 mm in diameter. These structures lack any visible border or rim around their edges. When examined under a microscope, they reveal several unique characteristics:

- long, relatively thick supporting filaments (paraphyses) that are 1.5–4 μm wide
- specialised spore-producing cells (asci) that contain eight spores each
- clear, two-celled spores that range from 5–18 μm in length.

Gilbertaria species frequently grow alongside blue-green algae of the genus Stigonema, which can be found between the lichen's granules or near its reproductive structures. While most species lack any distinct chemical compounds that would cause colour reactions with standard lichen spot tests, one species (G. squalescens) sometimes shows a faint grey or white glow under ultraviolet light.

== Species ==
- Gilbertaria astrapeana Fryday & M.Svensson (2022) – Falkland Islands
- Gilbertaria contristans (Nyl.) M.Svensson & Fryday (2022) – Northern and Central Europe and Greenland
- Gilbertaria holomeloides (Nyl.) M.Svensson & Fryday (2022) – UK, Sweden, and Canada
- Gilbertaria squalescens (Nyl.) M.Svensson & Fryday (2022) – North America, far eastern Russia, and Central and Northern Europe

Molecular studies suggest there may be additional undescribed species within the genus, as some specimens show genetic differences that do not correspond to currently recognised species. In particular, some specimens previously identified as G. contristans may represent a distinct, currently undescribed species.

== Habitat and ecology ==
Gilbertaria species are specialised lichens adapted to arctic and apline environments. They primarily inhabit areas where snow persists late into the growing season, particularly on rock walls, outcrops, and alpine tundra. These lichens show a strong preference for growing on dying or dead moss colonies, especially species of Andreaea and Gymnomitrion, and are often found in seepage areas where water periodically flows over rocks.

The genus plays an important ecological role as a pioneer organism in these harsh environments. Their ability to colonise dying bryophytes suggests they may be adapted to utilising nutrients released by decomposing moss tissues. The lichens commonly form associations with filamentous cyanobacteria, particularly species of Stigonema, which can be found growing between the lichen's structures or near its reproductive bodies. This association may provide additional nitrogen to support the lichen's growth in nutrient-poor environments.

Individual species show subtle variations in their habitat preferences. G. contristans typically occurs in relatively dry situations on dying bryophytes on sloping rock walls, while G. holomeloides favours more humid conditions and is often found growing directly on the ground. G. squalescens frequently grows alongside other alpine lichens such as Frutidella caesioatra and Lecanora leptacina. Despite their specialised habitat requirements, these lichens can be easily overlooked due to their small size and inconspicuous appearance, suggesting they may be more widely distributed than current records indicate.
