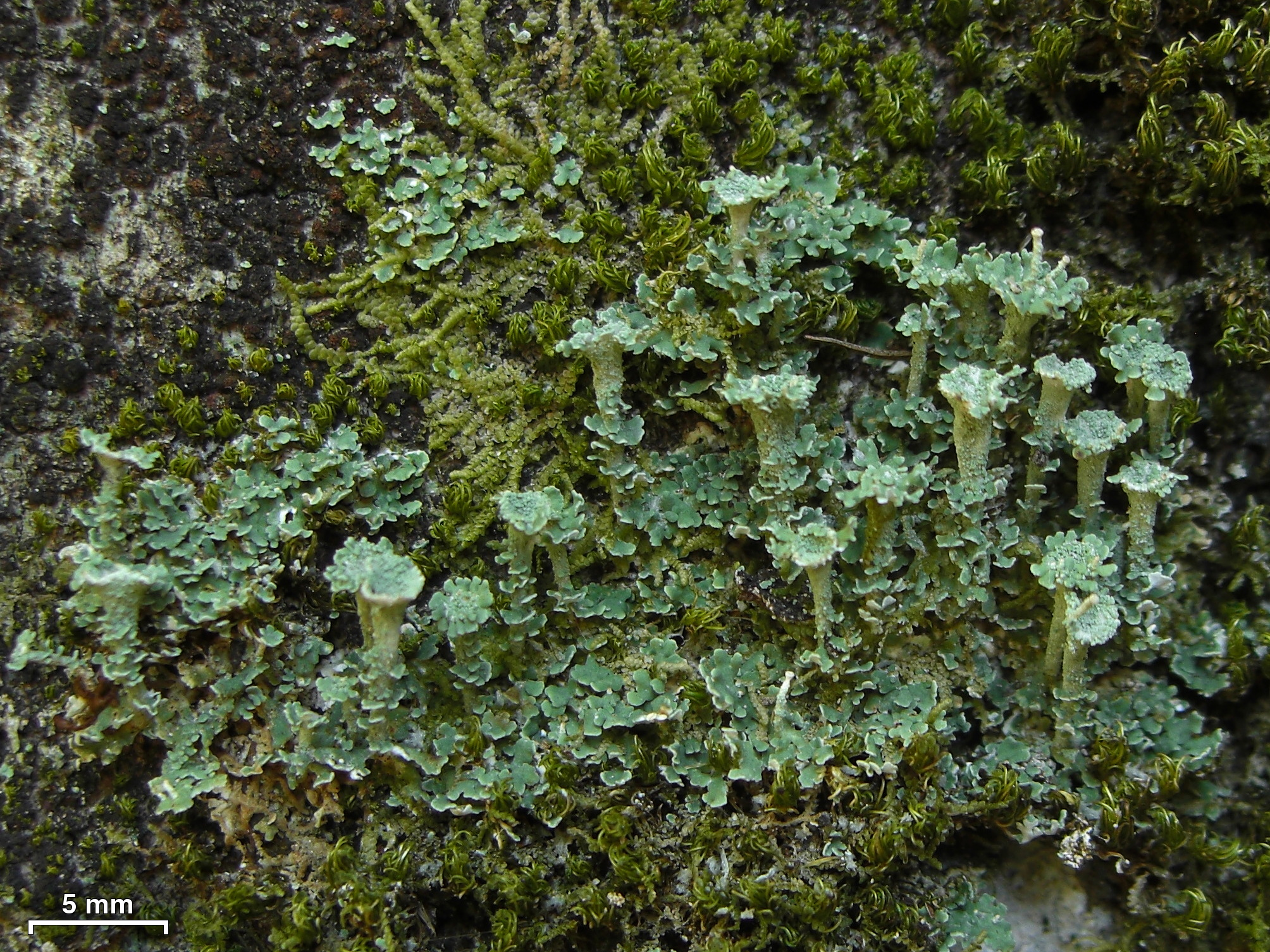

Conservation status
- Secure (NatureServe)

Scientific classification
- Kingdom: Fungi
- Division: Ascomycota
- Class: Lecanoromycetes
- Order: Lecanorales
- Family: Cladoniaceae
- Genus: Cladonia
- Species: C. grayi

Binomial name
- Cladonia grayi G.Merr. ex Sandst. (1929)

Synonyms
- Cladonia chlorophaea var. grayi (G.Merr. ex Sandst.) P.A.Duvign. (1937); Cladonia pyxidata subsp. grayi (G.Merr. ex Sandst.) V.Wirth (1994)

= Cladonia grayi =

Species of lichen

Cladonia grayi, commonly known as Gray's cup lichen or Gray's pixie cup, is a species of fruticose lichen in the family Cladoniaceae. It is characterised by small, leaf-like squamules forming its primary thallus and distinctive upright podetia (5–15 mm tall) that develop into goblet-shaped cups. The species contains several unique lichen substances, primarily grayanic acid, which causes it to glow light blue under ultraviolet light, and has also been found to produce protective pyrrolopyrazine compounds. Its photobiont is the green algal species Asterochloris glomerata.

The fungal component shows distinctive growth responses during development that occur only when encountering compatible algal cells, with the fungus growing extremely slowly at ≤1 cm per year in culture. Though found worldwide, C. grayi is most abundant in Arctic and temperate regions of the Northern Hemisphere. It typically grows on acidic substrates including rotting wood, organic soil layers, and bare ground, showing particular abundance in pine forests across a range of humidity conditions. Two chemical variants (chemotypes) have been documented: one containing only grayanic acid and 4-O-demethylgrayanic acid, and another that additionally contains substances of the fumarprotocetraric acid complex.

== Taxonomy ==
The type specimen of Cladonia grayi was collected in 1928 near Long Creek in Charlotte, Mecklenburg County, North Carolina (originally cited as "North Virginia"). It was distributed as part of Sandstede's Cladoniae Exsiccatae collection, number 1847. The lectotype specimen is housed at the Farlow Herbarium (FH) at Harvard University and was designated by Teuvo Ahti in 1993 in his work published in Regnum Vegetabile.

Several forms of this species have been proposed, but it is unclear if these historical infrataxa have independent taxonomic significance. As Evans noted about form simplex, "the present form may represent either a stage in the development of one of the more complex forms or a definitely arrested conditions which will not develop further."

- C. grayi f. aberrans Asahina (1940)
- C. grayi f. carpophora A.Evans (1938)

- A fertile form with abundant large brown apothecia on cup margins or stalks, characterized by dark grayish-green to olive-green podetia lacking squamules.

- C. grayi f. centralis A.Evans (1944)
- C. grayi f. cyathiformis Sandst. (1930)
- C. grayi f. fasciculata Trass (1963)
- C. grayi f. grayi G.Merr. ex Sandst. (1929)
- C. grayi f. lacerata A.Evans (1950)
- C. grayi f. peritheta A.Evans (1944)
- C. grayi f. prolifera Sandst. (1938)

- A sterile form with unsquamulose podetia bearing scattered cup-like proliferations.

- C. grayi f. simplex Robbins (1938)

- A sterile form with simple, unsquamulose podetia having entire or nearly entire cup margins.

- C. grayi f. squamulosa Sandst. (1931)

Common names that have been used for Cladonia grayi include "Gray's cup lichen" and "Gray's pixie cup".

== Description ==
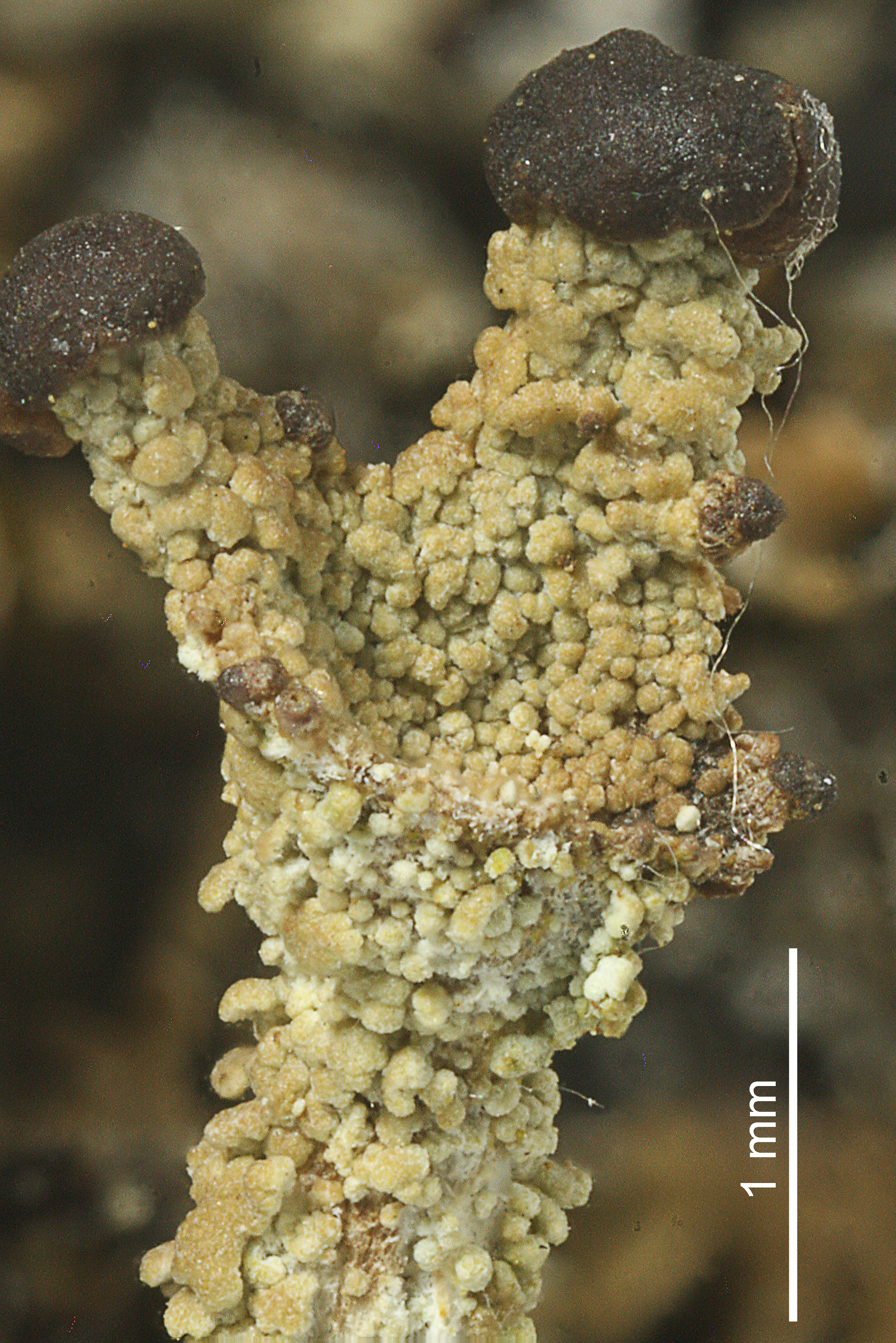
Closeup of a C. grayi podetium showing its granular surface texture and dark brown apothecia at the tips. Scale bar = 1 mm.

Cladonia grayi is characterised by two main parts: a primary thallus consisting of small, persistent leaf-like structures (squamules), and a secondary thallus comprising upright stalks called podetia. The squamules, which form a crusty layer on the substrate, are small (1 mm long and 1–2 mm wide) with wavy edges and tend to grow upward.

The podetia, which are the most distinctive feature of the species, grow 5–15 mm tall and 2–7 mm wide. They are shaped like goblets (scyphose) with long, narrow stalks expanding into round, globe-like cups at the top. These structures are typically light greyish-green but can appear dark or somewhat brownish. The surface of the podetia is covered with a protective layer (cortex) that can be bumpy and may peel off in patches as the lichen ages. The upper portions develop powdery areas (soralia) and granules measuring 40–130 micrometres in diameter, or they may produce small flaking squamules. The granules are thought to play a play in propagation of the species.

The species' reproductive structures include dark brown spore-producing discs (apothecia) that appear uncommonly along the cup margins, and more frequent smaller structures called pycnidia that produce a clear fluid.

== Ultrastructure ==
When examined at a microscopic level, the fungal cells of C. grayi show several distinctive features. They contain nuclei with prominent pores, dense cytoplasmic material, and storage areas for glycogen (a form of sugar). The cells also have specialised compartments called vacuoles that contain granular material, as well as lipid bodies for fat storage. A particularly notable feature is that the fungal cell walls are covered with tiny thread-like projections called fibrils, which extend outward. When fungal cells grow close to each other, these fibrils can interconnect to form meshwork patterns, helping to bind the cells together.

The fungus can also form unique supportive structures called "acellular struts." These struts appear to be modified branches that have lost their internal cellular contents but maintain their outer walls, and they may help provide structural support to the lichen body. These struts are more commonly found in parts of the fungus growing above the surface rather than those in direct contact with the growing surface.

== Chemistry ==
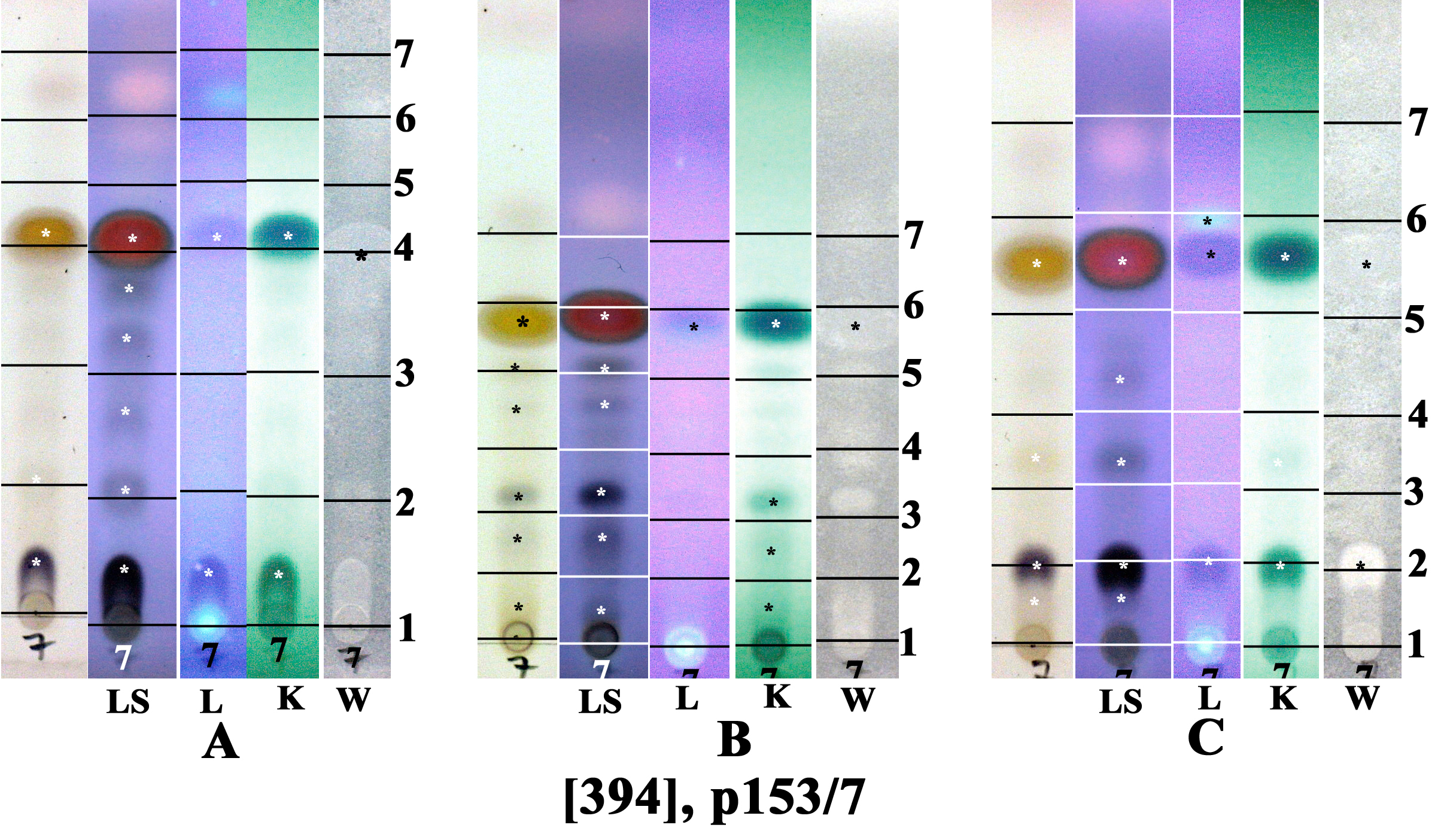
Thin-layer chromatography analysis of C. grayi using three different solvent systems (A, B, C), with each showing four visualization methods (LS, L, K, W). Spots in column LS correspond to reference standards 4 (congrayanic acid) and 5 (4-O-demethylgrayanic acid). Sample collected from Black Forest, Germany.

When tested with standard chemical spot tests used in lichen identification, C. grayi shows distinctive reactions, particularly glowing ice-blue under ultraviolet light. It contains several unique lichen substances, primarily grayanic acid, with varying amounts of congrayanic and demethylgrayanic acids, and occasionally traces of fumarprotocetraric acid complex. Grayanic acid, an orcinol depsidone, is a rare metabolite that has only been reported from Neophyllis melacarpa and C. grayi.

The thalli of C. grayi contain a diverse array of carotenoid pigments, including β-carotene, α-carotene, β-cryptoxanthin, zeaxanthin, lutein, antheraxanthin, hydroxyechinenone, canthaxanthin, astaxanthin, violaxanthin, mutatoxanthin, neoxanthin and capsochrome. The concentrations and ratios of these carotenoids vary depending on light exposure, with specimens from more shaded environments showing higher total carotenoid content. In particular, lutein and violaxanthin are found in higher concentrations in shade-grown specimens, while zeaxanthin and antheraxanthin increase in specimens exposed to higher light levels. This variation appears to be part of a xanthophyll cycle that helps regulate photosynthesis under different light conditions.

Research published in 2018 showed that the fungal component of C. grayi contains genes for producing protective compounds called pyrrolopyrazines (PPZ). Like many lichens, C. grayi produces various secondary metabolites – chemicals that are not essential for basic life functions but help the organism survive. The PPZ compounds appear to help protect the lichen against insects that might try to eat it.

The genes responsible for making these compounds are grouped together in what scientists call a "gene cluster". This discovery was significant because previously, these types of genes were only known from certain insect-pathogenic fungi like Metarhizium species. Finding these genes in C. grayi helped scientists understand that this chemical defense system is much older than previously thought, dating back to the early evolution of a major group of fungi called Pezizomycotina.

=== Similar species ===
Cladonia grayi is a member of the C. chlorophaea group, a complex of morphologically similar lichens that some researchers have historically considered to be merely chemical variants of the same species. However, C. grayi maintains several distinguishing characteristics that support its status as a distinct species, including its corticate podetia with granular surfaces (rarely heavily sorediate) and its characteristically dark colour.

While C. grayi can be confused with related species, its closest look-alike is C. merochlorophaea, from which it can be distinguished by its smaller cups (scyphi) and less powdery surface texture. C. merochlorophaea typically displays more obvious powdery areas (soredia), especially in the central portions of its podetia. Another possible lookalike, C. rei, tends to have narrower cups than C. grayi, while C. pleurota can generally be differentiated by its overall yellow-green colour and reddish apothecia and pycnidia. However, due to the subtle nature of these morphological differences, definitive identification often requires thin-layer chromatography to analyze the specific lichen substances present.

Cladonia grayi often produces abundant small, leaf-like squamules, which was historically recognised as the form squamulosa. While this squamulose form can be confused with C. asahinae, which also frequently develops squamules on its podetia, the two species can be readily distinguished by their different chemical compositions. When C. grayi lacks squamules entirely, it becomes very difficult to distinguish from C. merochlorophaea based on morphology alone, and chemical analysis becomes necessary for definitive identification.

== Development ==
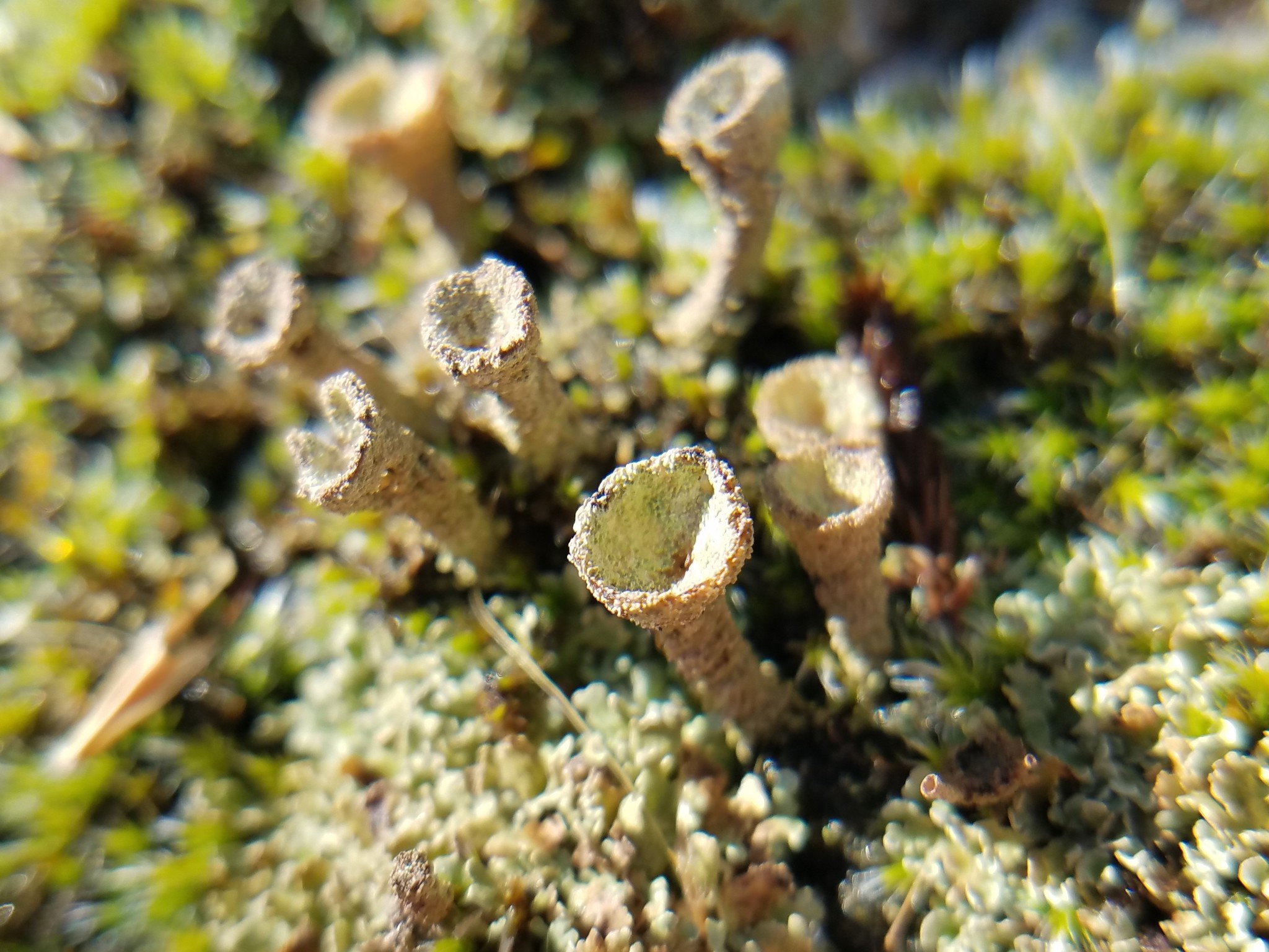
The primary thallus consists of tiny leaf-like squamules, and the secondary thallus comprises upright, goblet-shaped podetia.

The development of a lichen symbiosis in Cladonia grayi involves five main stages: a pre-contact stage where chemical signalling occurs between the fungus and alga without physical contact, a contact stage where they first physically connect, an envelopment stage where fungal hyphae surround the algal cells, an incorporation stage forming an undifferentiated pre-thallus, and finally a differentiation stage producing the complex thallus structure. During these stages, both partners show coordinated changes in gene expression that facilitate their symbiotic relationship.

Research has shown that C. grayi has a highly specific response when encountering its compatible photobiont Asterochloris. While the fungus can grow over various surfaces and organisms, it only displays a distinctive growth pattern involving increased lateral branching when it contacts Asterochloris cells. This selective response is part of the early contact stage of lichen development, though not all algal cells trigger this response, suggesting that factors like cell age may influence successful symbiotic initiation. When grown with other green algae like Chlorella vulgaris or Trentepohlia species that are never found associated with C. grayi in nature, the fungus shows no specialised growth response, demonstrating the specificity of the fungus-alga recognition system.

The development of Cladonia grayi follows a distinct pattern that can be traced through the growth of its fungal meristem tissue. In early ontogeny, when the podetium (the erect secondary thallus) is about 100 μm tall, it begins as an obconical, vertically oriented mass of fungal tissue. The upper surface starts as a slightly concave disc composed primarily of meristematic tissue, with few loose hyphae or algal cells near the apex. As development continues, the meristem tissue thins toward the centre of the disc while the margin expands both outward and vertically.

The species exhibits two main developmental phases in its cup formation. In the first phase, while the contiguous meristem grows uniformly, the cup maintains a roughly symmetrical shape with a circular margin. During the second phase, the previously continuous meristematic tissue at the margin divides into separate bundles, which can develop into apothecia, pycnidia, or lichenised proliferations. Some podetia, particularly those growing in exposed conditions, may maintain wider, shallower cups with a continuous meristematic margin, while others, typically found in less exposed conditions, develop proliferations from the cup margin.

A distinctive feature of C. grayi's development is its subtly articulated spiral growth pattern, which becomes most apparent in branching proliferations growing along the cup margin. As the podetium matures, one portion of the meristematic tissue often grows faster than the rest, creating an asymmetrical cup with an oblique margin. This faster-growing section typically carries the largest bundle of meristematic tissue at its apex and may become the dominant proliferation. The proliferations can branch further, developing into various forms including narrowly branched, blunt, or swollen-laminar structures, with the meristematic tissue at their apices following a spiral growth pattern.

== Photobiont ==
The photobiont of Cladonia grayi is Asterochloris glomerata, a unicellular green alga belonging to the Trebouxiales, which is the most common order of lichen algae. The A. glomerata genome is about 56 megabases (Mb) in size and contains around 10,000 gene models. This genome size is significantly smaller than that of Chlamydomonas reinhardtii (120 Mb) but larger than those of other Trebouxiophyceae like Coccomyxa subellipsoidea C-169 (49 Mb) and Chlorella variabilis NC64A (46.2 Mb).

During the initial stages of symbiosis formation, A. glomerata and the fungal partner show coordinated changes in gene expression related to metabolic exchange. The photobiont upregulates genes encoding extracellular hydrolases and membrane transport proteins, while matching increases occur in the expression of ammonium and ribitol transporters in the fungus. This synchronised genetic response facilitates the metabolic interactions necessary for successful lichenisation.

Analysis of the A. glomerata genome revealed several distinctive features related to its role as a lichen photobiont. The alga possesses meiosis-specific genes, supporting the occurrence of sexual reproduction in its free-living stage, which has implications for lichen adaptability. The genome also shows evidence of horizontal gene transfer, including a large viral DNA insertion of approximately 540 kilobases, as well as genes likely acquired from archaea and bacteria. Among these are genes potentially involved in stress resistance, including archaeal ATPases and bacterial desiccation-related proteins.

Notable expansions in gene families were observed in A. glomerata, including kinases, carbohydrate-active enzymes, and ankyrin domain proteins. The alga also shows a reduced set of nitrate assimilation genes compared to other green algal genomes, suggesting adaptation to obtaining nitrogen primarily from its fungal partner. Additionally, A. glomerata has retained proteins associated with flagellar motility, matching microscopic observations of flagellated zoospores and gametes in its free-living state, though these structures are not present in the lichenised form.

== Habitat and distribution ==
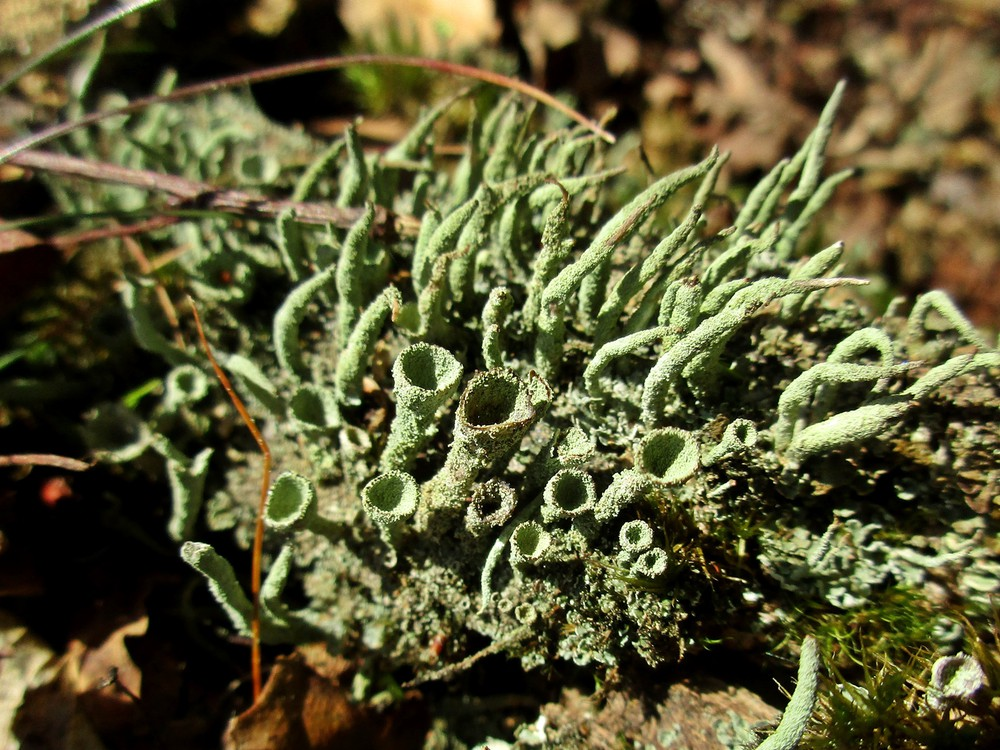
in Garderen - Houtdorperveld, the Netherlands

Cladonia grayi is a widespread lichen species that demonstrates considerable adaptability in its choice of growing surfaces. It can be found on multiple substrates, including rotting wood, organic soil layers (humus), and bare ground, showing a strong preference for highly acidic conditions.

While the species has a nearly cosmopolitan distribution, it is most abundant in the Northern Hemisphere, particularly in Arctic and temperate regions. In Mediterranean areas, it is relatively uncommon, occurring in scattered populations primarily in meso- to supramediterranean zones, and showing a preference for Eurosiberian regions from colline to montane elevations. The species is also present in the Southern Hemisphere, with documented occurrences in both Neotropical regions and Australasia, though these populations tend to be more dispersed and are typically found at higher altitudes.

Cladonia grayi appears to be the most common member of the C. chlorophaea group in Belarus, where it represents approximately 40% of specimens examined in a comprehensive survey. Two chemotypes have been documented in Belarus with roughly equal frequency: one containing only grayanic acid and 4-O-demethylgrayanic acid, and another that additionally contains substances of the fumarprotocetraric acid complex. The species shows distinct ecological preferences in Belarus, being found primarily (90%) in pine forests across a range of humidity conditions, from wet boggy areas to extremely dry stands. It has been documented growing on various substrates including pine bark, soil, decaying wood, juniper, oak, birch, hornbeam and alder bark, though chemotype I tends to occur more frequently on acidic tree bark while chemotype II is more commonly found on soil and wood.

== See also ==
- List of Cladonia species
