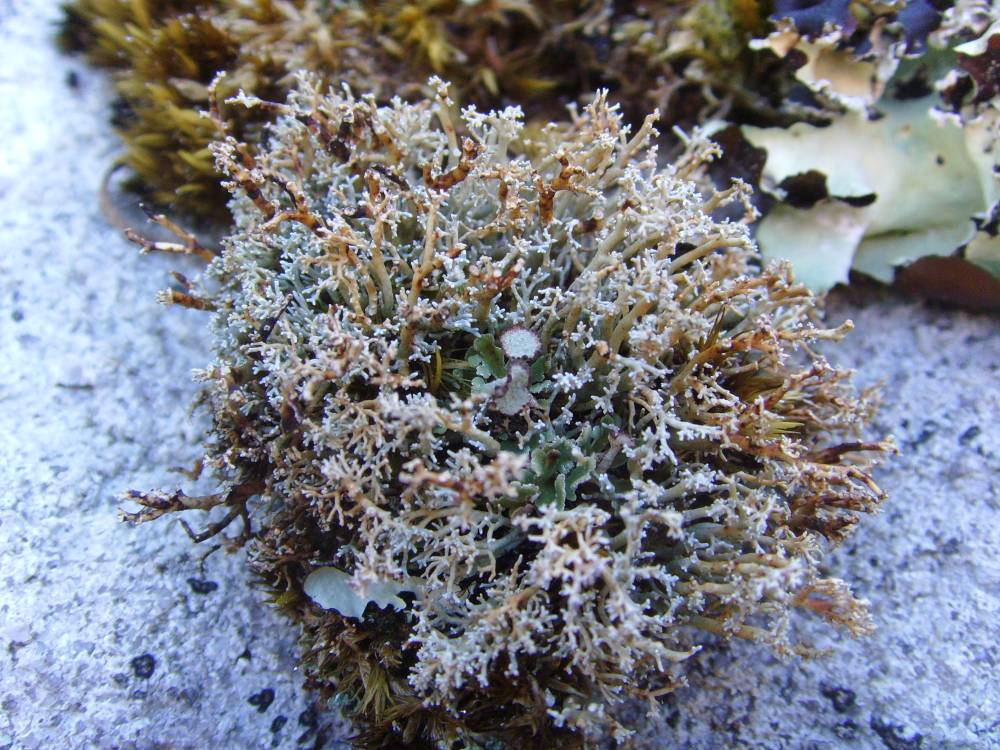

Conservation status
- Secure (NatureServe)

Scientific classification
- Domain: Eukaryota
- Kingdom: Fungi
- Division: Ascomycota
- Class: Lecanoromycetes
- Order: Lecanorales
- Family: Sphaerophoraceae
- Genus: Sphaerophorus
- Species: S. globosus

Binomial name
- Sphaerophorus globosus (Huds.) Vain.

= Sphaerophorus globosus =

Species of fungus

Sphaerophorus globosus is a species of lichen belonging to the family Sphaerophoraceae.

It has cosmopolitan distribution.
