= Grayanic acid =

Chemical compound found in some lichens

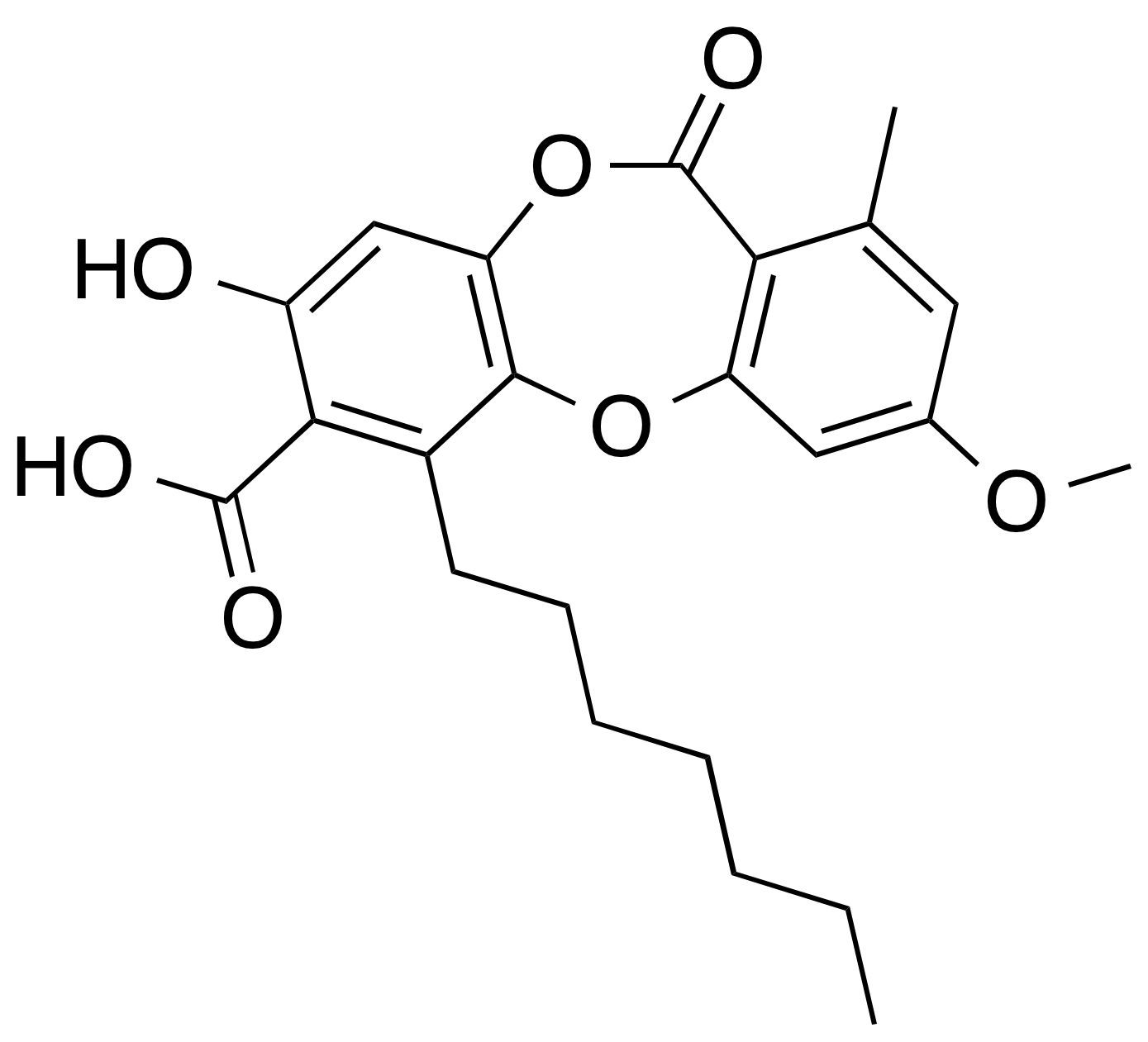

Names
- IUPAC name 1-Heptyl-3-hydroxy-9-methoxy-7-methyl-6-oxobenzo[b][1,4]benzodioxepine-2-carboxylic acid
- Other names Grayanic acid

Identifiers
3D model (JSmol)	Interactive image
ChemSpider	123960063
PubChem CID	101679241
- InChI: InChI=1S/C23H26O7/c1-4-5-6-7-8-9-15-20(22(25)26)16(24)12-18-21(15)29-17-11-14(28-3)10-13(2)19(17)23(27)30-18/h10-12,24H,4-9H2,1-3H3,(H,25,26) Key: ADTVCAUSELVFML-UHFFFAOYSA-N
- SMILES: CCCCCCCC1=C(C(=CC2=C1OC3=C(C(=CC(=C3)OC)C)C(=O)O2)O)C(=O)O

Properties
Chemical formula	C_{23}H_{26}O_{7}
Molar mass	414.454 g·mol^{−1}
Appearance	colourless needles
Melting point	186–189 °C (367–372 °F; 459–462 K)
- Except where otherwise noted, data are given for materials in their standard state (at 25 °C [77 °F], 100 kPa). Infobox references

Grayanic acid is an organic compound found in certain lichens, particularly Cladonia grayi, where it serves as a secondary metabolite with notable taxonomic importance. Identified in the 1930s, it is now recognised as a chemotaxonomic marker that helps distinguish closely related species within the Cladonia chlorophaea species group. Grayanic acid crystallises as colourless, needle-like structures, melts at approximately 186–189 °C (367–372 °F), and displays distinctive fluorescence under ultraviolet light, aiding in its detection and study.

Chemically, grayanic acid is a depsidone, featuring two aromatic rings linked by ester and ether bonds. Its biosynthesis occurs in the fungal partner of the lichen and does not require the presence of the algal symbiont. Genetic research has identified a key biosynthetic gene cluster responsible for its formation, highlighting biochemical pathways and enzymes that convert precursor compounds into grayanic acid and related metabolites such as sphaerophorin.

Beyond its chemical characteristics, grayanic acid has proven invaluable in refining lichen taxonomy, as variations in its presence and concentration underpin subtle species distinctions. By comparing grayanic acid profiles across different populations and geographic regions, researchers have gained insights into evolutionary relationships, species distribution patterns, and the ecological roles that these fungal–algal partnerships play in diverse environments.

== History ==
Grayanic acid was first isolated in the 1930s by Yasuhiko Asahina and Zyozi Simosato from the lichen species Cladonia grayi. In their initial study, they determined it to be a crystalline acid with a melting point of 185 °C and proposed a molecular formula of C_{21}H_{24}O_{7}. However, further investigation was limited at the time due to a shortage of material.

By 1943, Alexander W. Evans highlighted the utility of Asahina's microchemical methods, including microcrystallisation, in identifying grayanic acid. Evans described its needle-like crystals, which often formed radiating clusters under specific conditions, and noted a melting point near 185 °C (365 °F), consistent with Asahina's findings.

In 1963, Shoji Shibata and Hsiich-Ching Chiang revised the molecular formula to C_{23}H_{26}O_{7} and refined the melting point to 186–189 °C, aligning it with subsequent modern analyses. Their work also supported Asahina's classification of the Cladonia chlorophaea complex into distinct species based on chemical markers, such as grayanic acid, cryptochlorophaeic acid, and merochlorophaeic acid. However, Elke Mackenzie suggested that such differences were better explained as chemical strains (chemotypes) within a single species. Later synthetic studies in 1976 determined a slightly lower range of 181.5–182.5 °C for synthetic grayanic acid, highlighting minor variations attributable to synthetic purity.

== Structure ==
The molecular structure of grayanic acid consists of a depside skeleton with two benzene rings connected by both ester (-CO-O-) and ether (-O-) linkages, forming a depsidone. The molecule contains one methoxy group (H_{3}CO-), one free hydroxyl group (-OH), and a chelated carboxyl group (-COOH). Nuclear magnetic resonance studies revealed the presence of alkyl side chains, specifically determined to be either (1) CH_{3} and C_{7}H_{15} or (2) C_{2}H_{5} and C_{6}H_{13}. The complete systematic name for the compound is 6-heptyl-8-hydroxy-3-methoxy-1-methyl-11-oxo-11H-dibenzo[b,e][1,4]dioxepin-7-carboxylic acid.

While the initial structural assignment was based primarily on spectroscopic evidence, some uncertainty remained regarding the precise positions of the alkyl groups. This ambiguity was definitively resolved through total synthesis in 1976, which confirmed the original structural proposal. The compound's structure is notably similar to sphaerophorin, another lichen metabolite found in the genus Sphaerophorus.

== Properties ==
=== Physical properties ===
Grayanic acid forms radiating clusters of colourless needles upon crystallisation, and has a melting point of 186–189°C. It dissolves readily in ethyl acetate, methyl acetate, ethanol, and chloroform, is sparingly solubility in benzene, and is insoluble in hexane and petroleum ether. These solubility characteristics facilitate its extraction and crystallisation from lichen material. Synthetic material provided a more precise melting point, measured at 181.5–182.5°C.

Nuclear magnetic resonance spectroscopy identifies signals at δ 0.89 (deformed triplet, methyl), 1.26 (broad signal, five methylene groups), 2.50 (singlet, methyl), 3.24 (broad signal, ArCH_{2}), 3.83 (singlet, methoxy), and 6.62–6.72 (aromatic protons). Mass spectrometry detects a molecular ion peak at m/z 414 (M+, C_{23}H_{26}O_{7}), with characteristic fragmentation patterns including peaks at m/z 396 (M+-H_{2}O), 370 (M+-CO_{2}), and 165 (A-ring fragment). High-resolution mass spectrometry verifies the molecular formula, providing an exact 414.1679. The compound has identical Rf values across multiple solvent systems when compared with authentic natural samples.

The compound fluoresces blue under ultraviolet light, a distinctive property. This fluorescence aids in studying its accumulation in laboratory cultures of the fungal partner. When the fungus is grown in culture, grayanic acid forms visible extracellular deposits on aerial fungal filaments (hyphae). These deposits appear as patches or bands along the hyphae, accumulating more densely in older regions farther from the growing tips. The deposits dissolve readily in acetone or methanol, leaving only the fungal cell walls' natural fluorescence.

=== Chemical properties ===
The chemical behaviour of grayanic acid includes several distinctive reactions and spectroscopic characteristics. In ethanolic solution, it forms a violet colour with 1% ferric chloride, and a pale yellow colour with diazonium reagent. Its ultraviolet absorption spectrum shows two peaks (λ_{max}): one at 258 nm (log ε 4.10), and another at 300–310 nm (log ε of 3.5). Infrared spectroscopy identifies structural features such as a chelated carboxyl group at 1650 cm⁻¹, a lactonic linkage at 1750 cm⁻¹, and benzenoid rings with bands at 1570 and 1610 cm⁻¹. The compound remains stable under methanolysis, showing no changes after boiling in methanol for 18 hours.

Nuclear magnetic resonance studies of grayanic acid in chloroform show proton signals at τ = 9.10 (terminal methyl groups of long alkyl chains), τ = 8.63 (intermediate methylenes), and τ = 6.75 (end methylenes attached to the benzene ring). These signals, compared with those of similar compounds, helped identify the positions of functional groups in the molecule. In acetone, benzene ring protons exhibit chemical shifts at 6.13, 6.66, and 6.80 ppm, matching the pattern of related compounds like sphaerophorin.

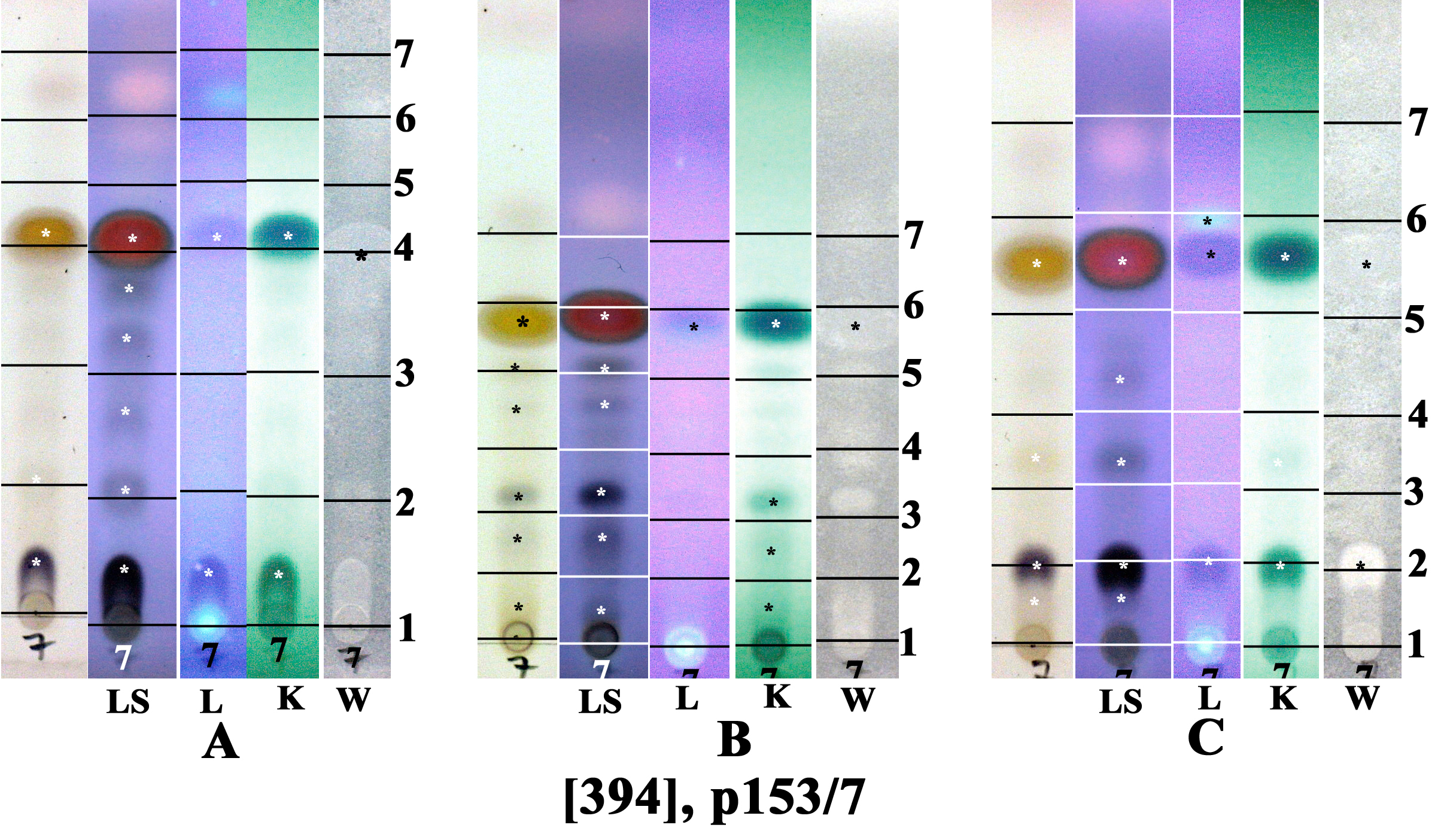
Thin-layer chromatography analysis of C. grayi using three different solvent systems (A, B, C), with each showing four visualization methods (LS, L, K, W). Spots in column LS correspond to reference standards 4 (congrayanic acid) and 5 (4-O-demethylgrayanic acid).

Thin-layer chromatography shows grayanic acid as a UV+ pale blue spot before heating, which becomes pale pinkish-brown with a UV+ purple hue after acid spray and heating. This chromatographic behaviour aids in identifying grayanic acid in complex lichen extracts, especially in chemotaxonomic studies distinguishing species like Neophyllis melacarpa and N. pachyphylla by their metabolite profiles.

Grayanic acid displays characteristic behaviour in solvents and chemical tests. During bicarbonate solution tests, it forms an oily layer between ether and aqueous phases, in addition to its standard solubility properties. It fluoresces green when treated with potassium hydroxide and chloral hydrate but gives a negative result in the homofluorescein reaction. These chemical properties helped classify grayanic acid as an orcinol-type depsidone rather than a simple depside.

=== Reactivity ===
Grayanic acid undergoes chemical transformations that aid in understanding its structure and reactivity. It readily forms a mono-acetate derivative (melting point 155–157°C) and can be converted to a methyl ether methyl ester (melting point 88–90°C). Acetylgrayanic acid is prepared by treating grayanic acid with acetic anhydride and sulfuric acid. The resulting crystals melt at 57–59°C after recrystallisation from benzene and n-hexane.

Under ice-cooling, potassium hydroxide converts grayanic acid into grayanoldicarboxylic acid, while barium hydroxide treatment yields grayanolic acid. These reactions illustrate the compound's reactivity with bases and its capacity to form structurally distinct derivatives.

Grayanic acid also shows characteristic solubility behaviour in chemical tests. For example, when shaken with aqueous sodium bicarbonate, it forms an oily layer between the ethereal and aqueous phases, a property that facilitates its separation during analysis.

== Occurrence ==
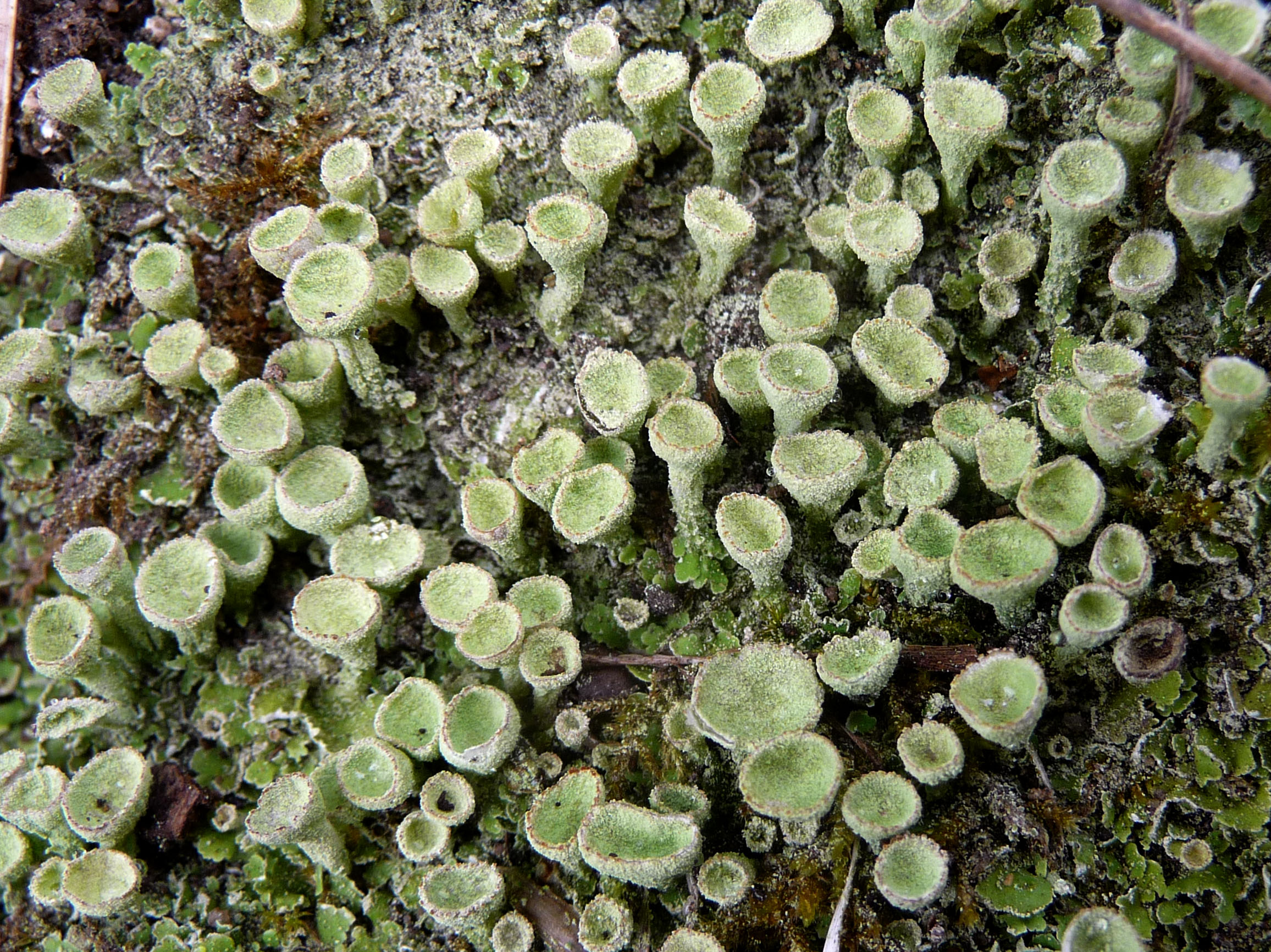
The widespread lichen Cladonia grayi, known for producing grayanic acid, typically grows on soil and decaying wood in temperate and subtropical regions.

Grayanic acid was first discovered and isolated from Cladonia grayi. Initial extractions yielded about 0.7% grayanic acid from raw lichen material, producing 350 milligrams of pure crystals from 50 grams of lichen. Ethanol and chloroform facilitated this yield, aiding the purification process.

Although initially identified only in C. grayi, later research detected grayanic acid in other Cladonia species. One example is Cladonia anitae, an endemic species discovered in 1982 along the Atlantic Coast of southeastern North Carolina. In this species, grayanic acid is a major metabolite, found with usnic acid and rhodocladonic acid. Grayanic acid is also a major secondary metabolite in Jarmania tristis, a byssoid lichen endemic to Tasmania's cool temperate rainforests. In J. tristis, it co-occurs with usnic acid and 4-O-demethylgrayanic acid, shaping the species' distinctive chemistry.

Grayanic acid production varies geographically among C. grayi populations. Caribbean specimens exhibit chemical variants, with some populations producing grayanic acid alongside related compounds like stenosporonic and divaronic acids. This variation appears geographically influenced, with West Indian specimens showing different proportions of these compounds compared to North American ones. For example, Jamaican specimens typically contain grayanic acid and stenosporonic acid as major constituents, while other populations often produce grayanic acid alone.

Laboratory cultivation has revealed the conditions required for grayanic acid production by the fungal partner (mycobiont) of C. grayi. Isolated from its algal partner, the fungus produces substantial grayanic acid, particularly on solid media under dry conditions. Production starts days after transferring the fungus from liquid to solid growth medium and increases as aerial fungal filaments develop. Under optimal conditions, the cultured fungus can achieve production rates comparable to those of some non-lichen fungi producing similar compounds. The fungus's ability to synthesise grayanic acid in pure culture shows that the compound, while characteristic of the intact lichen, does not require the algal partner.

== Taxonomic significance ==
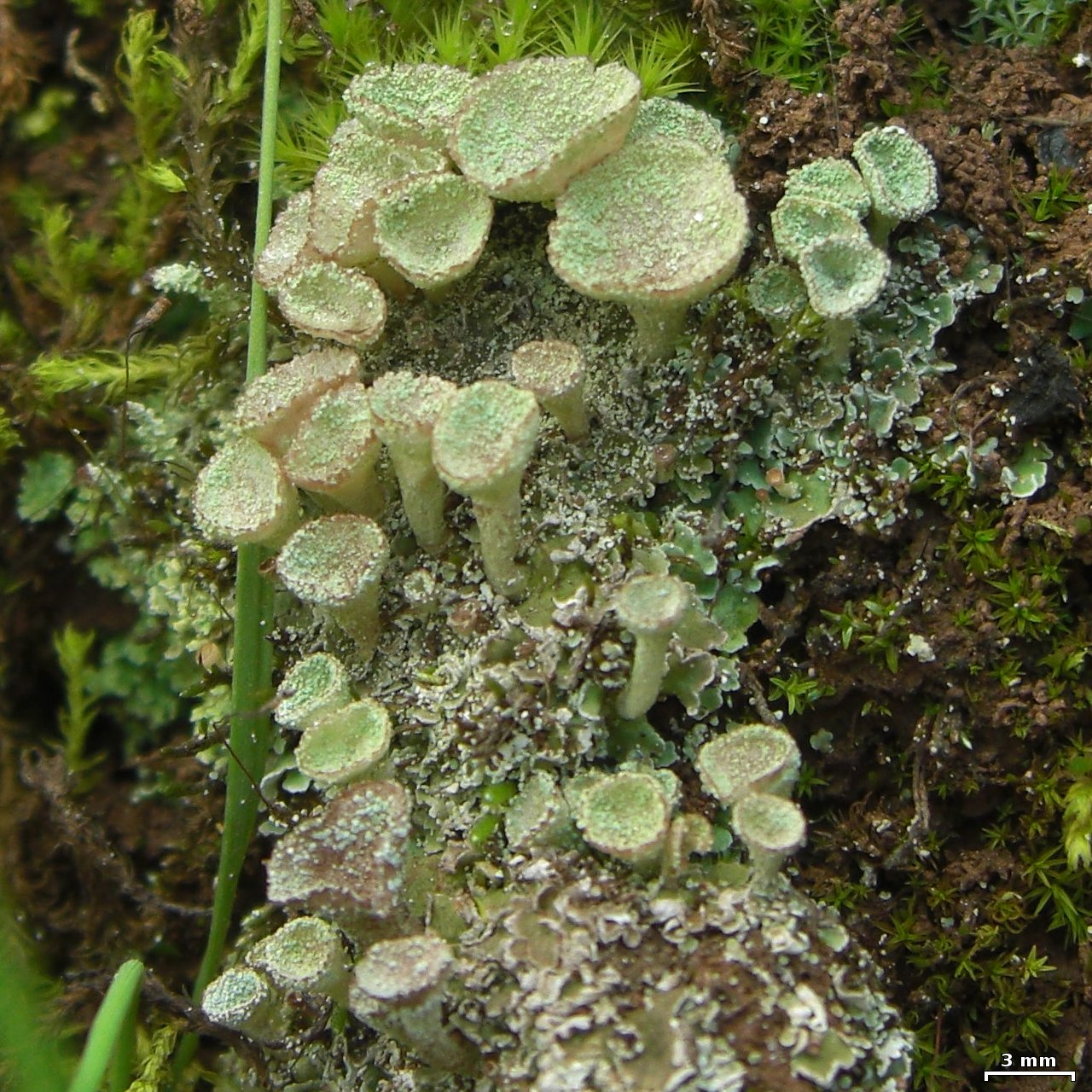
Cladonia chlorophaea, the namesake species of the C. chlorophaea species complex, known for its production of fumarprotocetraric acid and its taxonomic relationship to C. grayi.

Grayanic acid is integral to lichen taxonomy, particularly for distinguishing species in the Cladonia chlorophaea complex. Initially used with taste tests to separate species, detailed studies in the 1970s revealed more nuanced relationships between chemical composition and morphology.

Studies of North Carolina populations showed a correlation between grayanic acid and specific morphological traits. C. grayi, which contains grayanic acid, consistently exhibits smaller granules (soredia) in its podetial cups than C. cryptochlorophaea. These differences, unaffected by fumarprotocetraric acid content, indicate grayanic acid's taxonomic relevance. Similarly, in the Australasian genus Neophyllis, grayanic acid is a key chemotaxonomic marker distinguishing N. melacarpa from N. pachyphylla. N. melacarpa consistently produces grayanic acid with melacarpic acid and sometimes fumarprotocetraric acid, whereas N. pachyphylla contains only melacarpic acid. These chemical distinctions help resolve taxonomic ambiguities between the two species.

Taxonomic interpretations of chemical variation in these lichens have changed over time. Early classifications focused on the presence or absence of fumarprotocetraric acid (a bitter compound), but later studies suggested this variation reflects different genotypes of the same species rather than separate species. This pattern mirrors chemical variation seen in other lichens, such as the Cetraria islandica complex.

North American distribution studies reveal that specimens with both grayanic acid and fumarprotocetraric acid are more common in mountainous regions, while coastal populations primarily contain grayanic acid alone. Despite these chemical differences, the variants seem to belong to the same species, sharing consistent morphology aside from fumarprotocetraric acid presence.

== Synthesis ==
The first total synthesis of grayanic acid was accomplished by Peter Djura and Melvyn Sargent in 1976 at the University of Western Australia. The key step in their synthetic route was an Ullmann reaction to construct the diaryl ether linkage. Their successful synthesis not only provided access to the compound but also definitively confirmed its structural assignment.

The synthetic pathway proceeded through several key intermediates. Initially, the researchers constructed the two aromatic rings separately. The first ring component was prepared from methyl acetoacetate and (E)-methyl dec-2-enoate through a series of transformations. The second ring was synthesised starting from a benzyl-protected hydroxybenzoate.

The crucial Ullmann coupling reaction joined these two components with a 73% yield, forming the diaryl ether intermediate. Following this step, hydrogenolysis produced a hydroxy acid which was then converted to methyl O-methylgrayanate through lactonisation with trifluoroacetic anhydride. The final stages of the synthesis involved careful manipulation of protecting groups to yield grayanic acid, which was identical in all respects to the natural product isolated from lichens.

== Biosynthesis ==
The biosynthesis of grayanic acid involves fungal polyketide synthases and subsequent modifications, following a pathway similar to other lichen depsidones. Grayanic acid shares biosynthetic origins with sphaerophorin, a known lichen depside. Structural similarities and chemical transformation studies led Shibata and Chiang to propose sphaerophorin as a biosynthetic precursor to grayanic acid. The relationship is supported by shared structural features, such as similar methoxy and hydroxyl group arrangements on their benzenoid rings.

These foundational insights have been refined through genetic and biochemical studies. A 1985 study showed that grayanic acid biosynthesis depends entirely on the fungal genetics of C. grayi. Resynthesised lichens, formed by pairing fungal spores from grayanic acid-producing chemotypes with algal symbionts from unrelated lichens, consistently produced grayanic acid. This finding confirmed that the algal partner does not influence the chemotype, establishing the fungal component as the sole regulator of secondary metabolite production.

A 1992 study demonstrated that the fungal partner (mycobiont) of Cladonia grayi produces grayanic acid independently of its algal partner. Biosynthesis was linked to the development of aerial hyphae—thread-like fungal filaments that develop blue-fluorescent patches of grayanic acid under ultraviolet light. Production increased significantly under conditions of water stress and air exposure.

Genetic studies have elucidated the molecular mechanisms of grayanic acid biosynthesis. A biosynthetic gene cluster in C. grayi, including CgrPKS16 (a polyketide synthase that assembles the depside precursor 4-O-demethylsphaerophorin), drives the process. The pathway includes CYP682BG1, a cytochrome P450 monooxygenase for oxidative coupling, and an O-methyltransferase that adds a methyl group to complete the synthesis.

Grayanic acid belongs to a broader family of orcinol-type depsidones produced by lichens in the Cladonia chlorophaea group. These compounds form via biosequential patterns, with simpler depsides converting into more complex depsidones. This dynamic biosynthetic network produces related compounds, such as stenosporonic and divaronic acids, which exhibit variations in their carbon side-chain lengths across populations. This variation highlights the ecological and taxonomic relevance of grayanic acid in lichen communities.

The biosynthetic process shows distinct patterns during laboratory cultivation. Under suitable growing conditions, fungi first produce simpler depsides like 4-O-demethylsphaerophorin, followed by more complex depsidones like grayanic acid. This sequential process reflects the gene-driven enzymatic pathway and demonstrates the metabolic flexibility of lichen fungi.

== Related compounds ==
Grayanic acid shares key structural features with sphaerophorin, a depside found in Sphaerophorus lichens. Cryptochlorophaeic acid and merochlorophaeic acid, structurally related to grayanic acid, were first identified in the Cladonia chlorophaea complex. These compounds, described in detail by Shibata and Chiang, share structural similarities with grayanic acid, including benzenoid and ester group arrangements.

In 1985, two additional related depsidones were reported: stenosporonic acid (C_{23}H_{26}O_{7}) and divaronic acid (C_{21}H_{22}O_{7}). These compounds are lower homologs in the same chemical series as grayanic acid, sharing its basic structure but differing in carbon side-chain lengths. Both compounds were first identified in Caribbean populations of C. grayi, where they occur alongside grayanic acid in varying proportions. Mass spectrometry confirmed their structures, with stenosporonic acid displaying a characteristic molecular ion at m/z (mass-to-charge ratio) 414 and divaronic acid at m/z 386.

Discovered in 1982, 4-O-demethylgrayanic acid (C_{22}H_{24}O_{7}) naturally co-occurs with grayanic acid in several lichen species. This compound is present in all studied grayanic acid-producing lichens, including Cladonia and Gymnoderma melacarpum. Congrayanic acid, another related compound, may result from the nonenzymatic hydrolysis of grayanic acid, though it usually appears in trace amounts and is challenging to detect in unmanipulated extracts.

In 1980, congrayanic acid (C_{23}H_{28}O_{8}) was first synthesised by treating grayanic acid with aqueous sodium hydroxide, cleaving the ester linkage. It crystallises as colorless prisms with a melting point of 183–183.5°C. This process confirmed structural aspects of grayanic acid, as congrayanic acid retained key spectroscopic features of the parent compound.

Researchers have prepared several derivatives of grayanic acid, including:

- Methyl O-methylgrayanate, which forms needles with a melting point of 86.5–87.5°C
- Benzyl grayanate, crystallising as prisms with a melting point of 101.5–102°C
- Grayanoldicarboxylic acid, produced by treatment with potassium hydroxide

Grayanic acid belongs to the broader depsidone class, presumably formed through the oxidative cyclisation of p-depsides. This relationship is supported by the occasional, though rare, co-occurrence of depside-depsidone pairs in lichens.
