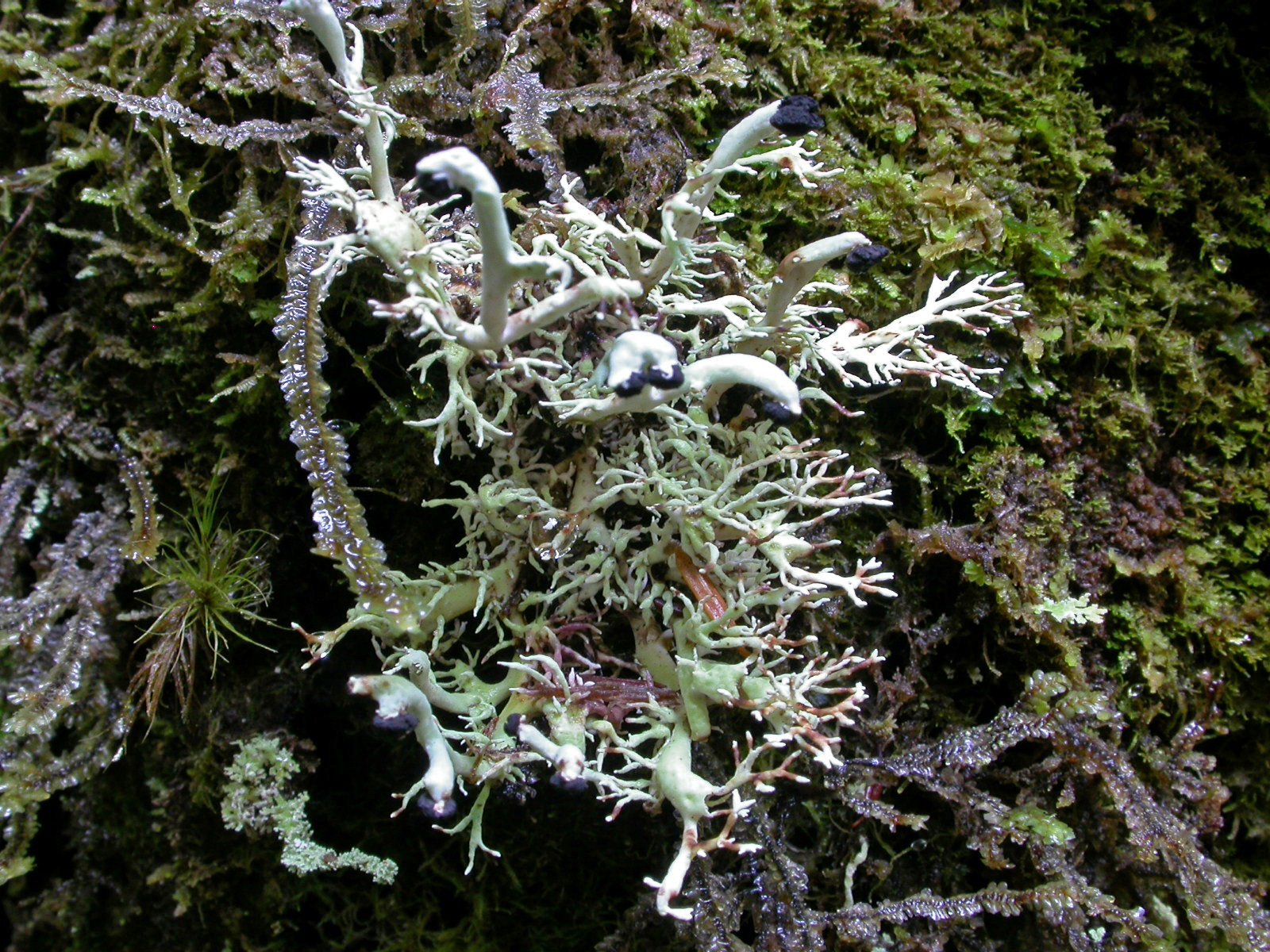
- Bunodophoron melanocarpum

Scientific classification
- Kingdom: Fungi
- Division: Ascomycota
- Class: Lecanoromycetes
- Order: Lecanorales
- Family: Sphaerophoraceae
- Genus: Bunodophoron; A.Massal. (1861)

Type species
- Bunodophoron australe (Laurer) A.Massal. (1861)

Synonyms
- Pleurocybe Müll.Arg. (1884); Pleurocybomyces Cif. & Tomas. (1953); Pseudosphaerophorus M.Satô (1968)

= Bunodophoron =

Genus of lichen-forming fungi

Bunodophoron is a genus of lichen-forming fungi in the family Sphaerophoraceae. The genus has a broad distribution in the Southern Hemisphere, with several species also present in oceanic regions of the Northern Hemisphere. Established in 1861 by the Italian botanist Abramo Bartolommeo Massalongo, the genus comprises about 20 accepted species that form shrubby, often tufted growths with flattened, strap-like branches. These lichens are characterised by their distinctive black, powdery spore masses that develop at the tips of fertile branches and their production of various lichen products including sphaerophorin and usnic acid.

== Taxonomy ==
The genus was circumscribed in 1861 by Abramo Bartolommeo Massalongo, with Bunodophoron australe assigned as the type species. In his original description, Massalongo explained that while he did not fully understand how certain lichenologists could maintain separate genera for what he considered closely related species, he had decided to keep together taxa such as Sphaerophoron coralloides and S. australe, while distinguishing them from other genera like Nephroma and Collema. He noted that Sphaerophoron australe and related species formed distinct taxa from the new genus Bunodophoron, whilst reducing other Sphaerophoron species to synonymy under established names.

Massalongo provided an anatomical description of Bunodophoron australe, noting its flattened thallus structure composed of distinct layers. He described an outer layer of bright green algal cells, followed by a darker layer lacking these cells, and finally a central core of elongated, branched cells mixed with a white, starchy substance. He observed that the internal structure consisted of a white layer lacking algae corresponding to an upper layer, followed by two additional layers as seen in the exterior, with the outermost portions showing the characteristic branching pattern.

== Description ==
Bunodophoron forms a shrubby (fruticose), often tufted thallus that may stand upright or trail along the substrate. Its branches are usually flattened like narrow straps, but longer fertile shoots tend to become almost cylindrical and rise above a carpet of shorter, sterile branches. The internal green algal partner (photobiont) is of the Trebouxia type.

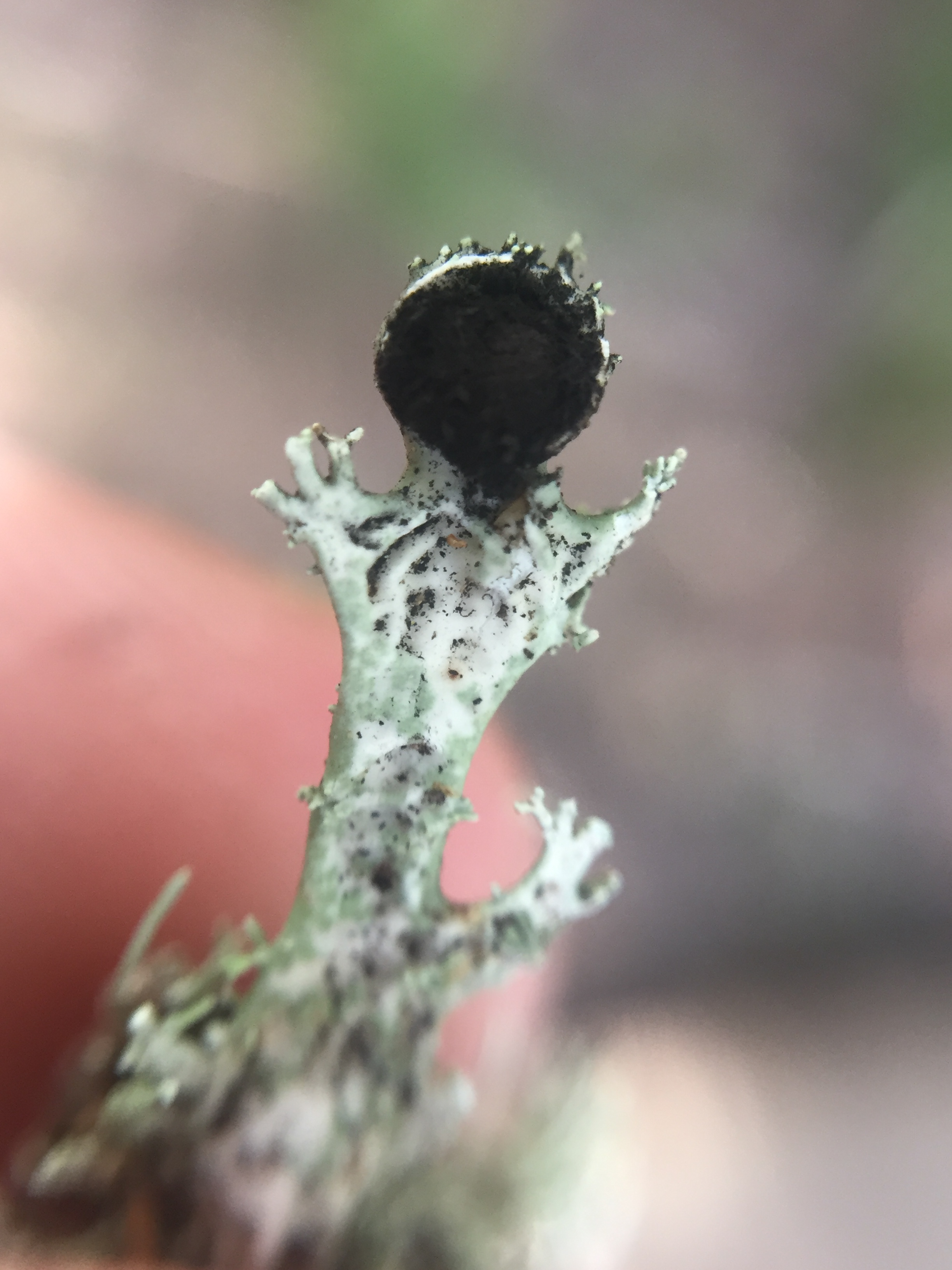
Closeup of Bunodophoron mazaedium (not identified to species)

The lichen's sexual organs are apothecia (fruiting bodies) positioned at the tips (and occasionally on the underside) of the fertile branches. As they mature, the apothecia lose their surrounding thalline rim and develop distinctive, black, powdery spore masses called mazaedia. Each cylindrical ascus contains eight ascospores arranged in a single file (uniseriate). These spores start out colourless, spherical, and without internal septa; with age they darken and acquire an irregular, grainy ornamentation.

Minute asexual structures (pycnidia) are embedded at branch tips and along the lower sides of terminal branches, releasing rod-shaped conidia—mitotic fungal spores that provide an asexual dispersal route for the mycobiont. Chemically, Bunodophoron synthesises several lichen substances—including sphaerophorin, various β-orcinol depsidones, usnic acid, and dibenzofuran derivatives—which contribute to its characteristic colour and help deter herbivory and microbial attack.

== Species ==
As of July 2025, Species Fungorum accepts 19 species of Bunodophoron.

- Bunodophoron agnetae Wedin (1995)
- Bunodophoron australe (Laurer) A.Massal. (1861)
- Bunodophoron awasthii G.P.Sinha & Jagad. Ram (2022) – India
- Bunodophoron coomerense (Ohlsson) Wedin (1993)
- Bunodophoron crespoae Soto, M.Prieto & Wedin (2018)
- Bunodophoron diplotypum (Vain.) Wedin (1993)
- Bunodophoron flabellatum (Hue) Soto, M.Prieto & Wedin (2018)
- Bunodophoron flaccidum (Kantvilas & Wedin) Wedin (1993)
- Bunodophoron formosanum (Zahlbr.) Wedin (1993)
- Bunodophoron imshaugii (Ohlsson) Wedin (1993)
- Bunodophoron insigne (Laurer) Wedin (1993)
- Bunodophoron macrocarpum (Ohlsson) Wedin (1993)
- Bunodophoron madagascareum (Nyl.) Wedin (1993)
- Bunodophoron melanocarpum (Sw.) Wedin (1995)
- Bunodophoron murrayi (Ohlsson ex Tibell) Wedin (1993)
- Bunodophoron notatum (Tibell) Wedin (1993)
- Bunodophoron patagonicum (C.W.Dodge) Wedin (1993)
- Bunodophoron pinnatum Wedin (2011)
- Bunodophoron ramuliferum (I.M.Lamb) Wedin (1993)
- Bunodophoron scrobiculatum (C.Bab.) Wedin (1993)
- Bunodophoron tibellii (Wedin) Wedin (1993)
