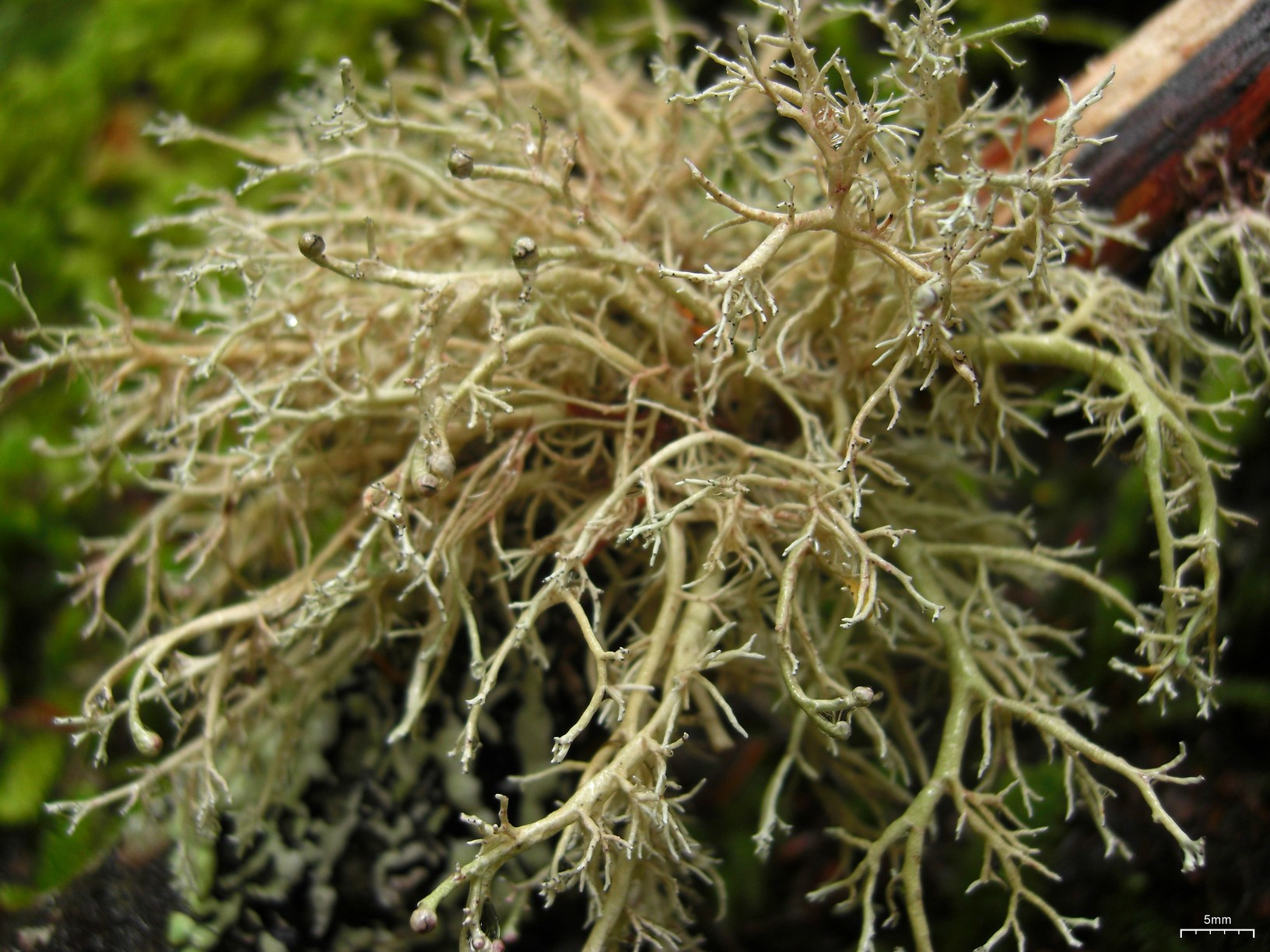
- Sphaerophorus venerabilis

Scientific classification
- Kingdom: Fungi
- Division: Ascomycota
- Class: Lecanoromycetes
- Order: Lecanorales
- Family: Sphaerophoraceae; Fr. (1831)

Type genus
- Sphaerophorus Pers. (1794)

Genera
- Austropeltum; Bunodophoron; Calycidium; Gilbertaria; Leifidium; Neophyllis; Sphaerophorus

Synonyms
- Calycidiaceae Elenkin (1929)

= Sphaerophoraceae =

Family of lichen-forming fungi

The Sphaerophoraceae are a family of lichen-forming fungi in the order Lecanorales. Species of this family have a widespread distribution, especially in southern temperate regions, with particular diversity in cool temperate rainforests and strongly oceanic areas of both hemispheres. The family, proposed by Elias Magnus Fries in 1831, is characterised by boundary tissue separating generative and vegetative parts, and includes species with various growth forms ranging from shrub-like (fruticose) to crusty (crustose). Most members produce mazaedia, specialised spore-dispersing structures typically found at branch tips, though some genera have different reproductive strategies. The family contains seven genera and 39 species, with members producing characteristic secondary metabolites such as sphaerophorin. While traditionally defined by fruticose growth forms and mazaedial reproduction, later molecular studies supported a broader circumscription that includes morphologically diverse genera such as the crustose Gilbertaria.

== Taxonomy ==
Sphaerophoraceae was circumscribed by the mycologist Elias Magnus Fries in 1831. By the late 18th century, only a few species now classified in this family were known to science, including Lichen fragilis (described by Carl Linnaeus in 1753) and L. globosus (described by William Hudson in 1762). The genus Sphaerophorus was established by Christiaan Hendrik Persoon in 1794, an early treatment relevant to the family's classification.

Historically, the family was circumscribed to macrolichens producing mazaedia (specialised fruiting bodies containing spores) and having prototunicate asci (spore sacs without special wall layers). These taxa were fruticose (shrub-like) with mazaediate spore dispersal. However, the family's concept has evolved significantly over time, particularly with the advent of molecular phylogenetics and anatomical studies. A specialised 'boundary tissue' occurs in all sampled members of the family and is proposed as a synapomorphy, supporting the inclusion of Neophyllis and Austropeltum despite differences in growth forms and reproduction.

Phylogenetic studies place Sphaerophoraceae within the class Lecanoromycetes and suggest a close relationship with the family Calycidiaceae. The inferred relationship is based on shared traits (e.g., occurrence of sphaerophorin and similarities in reproductive anatomy). Mazaediate structures have evolved independently multiple times in Ascomycota, including at least 14 within Lecanoromycetes.

Molecular analyses have further reshaped the family's circumscription by revealing evolutionary relationships with genera previously assigned to other families. For example, Neophyllis (formerly of Cladoniaceae) and Austropeltum (formerly of Stereocaulaceae) were found to form a well-supported monophyletic group with Sphaerophoraceae, leading to their reassignment. The inclusion of Gilbertaria in 2022 introduced the first crustose members to the family, expanding its documented morphological range.

The family's reproductive structures include prototunicate asci, now interpreted as derived by reduction from the tube-like structures found in other Lecanorales. The phylogenetic placement of Sphaerophoraceae remains uncertain; early molecular studies weakly supported a sister relationship with Bacidiaceae and Psoraceae. Sphaerophoraceae now encompasses a wide range of growth forms and reproductive structures, including mazaedia, lecideine apothecia, and stalked structures (podetia, pseudopodetia).

The family is placed within the suborder Sphaerophorineae of the order Lecanorales. Its relationships with other families in this group, including the Psilolechiaceae and Scoliciosporaceae, remain areas of active investigation.

== Description ==
The family Sphaerophoraceae includes species with varied growth forms. Many grow in a shrub-like (fruticose) manner, either upright or spreading across surfaces, while others form scale-like, shield-shaped, or crusty growths on their substrate. In fruticose species, branches are usually rounded or slightly flattened and tend to be brittle. Some species produce specialised reproductive branches. The reproductive anatomy varies among genera. Mazaedia-producing genera like Sphaerophorus and Bunodophoron begin reproductive development with the formation of a globose, plasma-rich primordium beneath the thallus cortex. This primordium differentiates into multiple zones, including a strongly pigmented pseudoparenchymatic base, an upper zone of ascogenous hyphae, and a developing hymenium. Together, these layers form the boundary tissue, a diagnostic feature of the family that separates vegetative and generative tissues while supporting reproduction. A distinctive feature of this anatomy is the 'watch-glass-like' boundary tissue at the base of mature apothecia. This characteristic is especially prominent in Leifidium tenerum, where the tissue develops early, forming a lens-like structure that supports the hymenium during spore dispersal. In these genera, mazaedia (powdery spore masses) develop when the upper apothecial wall disintegrates, exposing the hymenium and enabling passive spore dispersal. Reproductive anatomy varies in non-mazaedia-producing genera such as Austropeltum and Neophyllis. While Neophyllis retains some similarities to mazaedia-producing genera, including the formation of a pigmented boundary tissue, Austropeltum develops simpler apothecia that lack the generative tissue-derived layer found in other members of the family. These anatomical differences show variation in reproductive structures within the family.

The cortex (outer layer) ranges from 45–200 μm thick and is composed of thick-walled, gelatinised, fused hyphae covered by a thin epicortex. The medulla (inner layer) can be dense, lax, or hollow, depending on the species. Some species show a distinctive violet-blue reaction with iodine, a trait that can aid in identification.

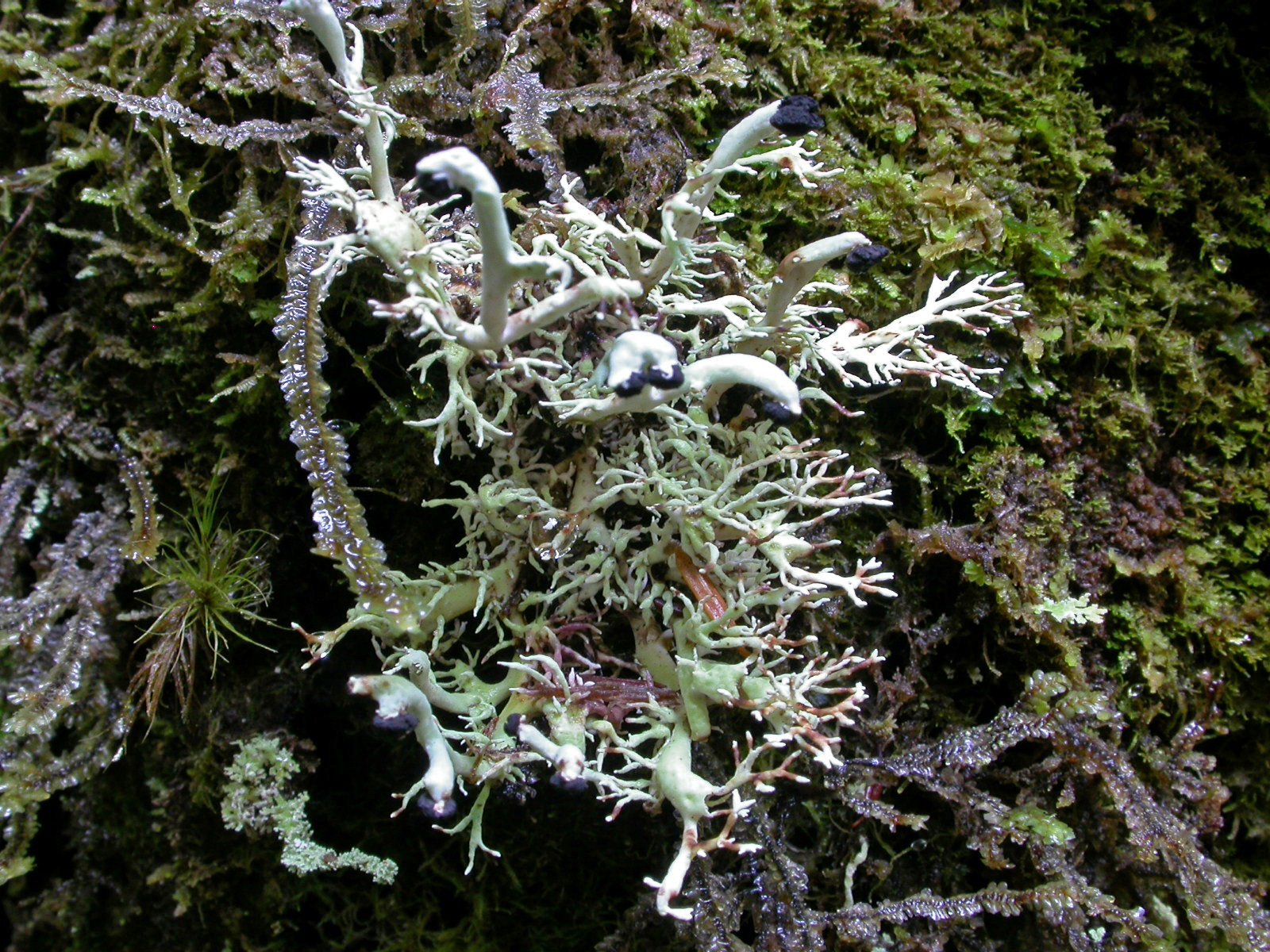
Bunodophoron melanocarpum

Species in Sphaerophoraceae are lichens with green-algal (chlorococcoid) photobionts. Their reproductive structures (ascomata) are apothecia. In the shrub-like genera, these develop into distinctive sooty-black, powder-filled structures (mazaedia) typically found at branch tips, though in some cases they are located on the underside of fertile branches. In some species, these structures may be elevated on stalks, while in crustose forms they sit directly on the surface. Some species of Bunodophoron, such as B. macrocarpum and B. scrobiculatum, have been interpreted as having a dimorphic thallus, where flattened thalli bear apothecia on marginal branches that are somewhat terete and variably developed.

The apothecia may be surrounded by tissue derived from the main body of the lichen (the thallus), forming irregular flaps in some species. This surrounding tissue may persist, be lost early in development, or be absent entirely. The spore-producing layer within these structures either breaks down in species with mazaedia or, in crusty forms, contains tightly packed, thread-like structures (paraphyses) that may branch near their tips.

The spores are produced in cylindrical sacs (asci) containing eight spores each. Prototunicate asci in Sphaerophoraceae are interpreted as derived by reduction relative to bitunicate/tubular forms in other Lecanorales. Some authors have suggested an association between reduction to prototunicate asci and the development of boundary tissue in mazaediate genera, but functional implications remain inferential.

Spores can be single-celled or two-celled, and vary in shape from spherical and elliptical to teardrop-shaped. While colourless in their early stages, the spores of some species darken with age. The spore surface may be smooth or decorated with irregular patterns or granules. The spore ornamentation process differs between genera. In some species, the ornamentation material is deposited on the spore wall inside the asci, while in others it forms from an amorphous substance that adheres to the wall after the spores are released. The ornamentation appears greenish in potassium hydroxide (KOH) solution and reddish in nitric acid.

Reproductive structure development (ontogeny) can be angiocarpic, where the excipulum encloses the hymenium until the mazaedium forms, or hemiangiocarpic, where the mazaedium is exposed earlier. The paraphyses are typically carbonised in most species, a distinguishing feature of the family. The family also produces asexual reproductive structures (pycnidia) that generate small spores (conidia). In shrub-like forms, these develop at branch tips and along their lower surfaces, whilst in crusty species they are embedded within the thallus. The conidia vary in shape from thread-like to rod-shaped or elliptical. The conidiophores in Sphaerophoraceae are similar to Vobis's type VI, having branched and anastomosing conidiophores with conidia produced terminally and intercalarily on thin extensions of the conidiogenous cells, a pattern found in many other lecanoralean lichens.

=== Boundary tissue ===
The boundary tissue in Sphaerophoraceae, found in all members of the family, separates generative (ascomatal) and vegetative (thalline) tissues. It has been proposed as a synapomorphy uniting the group. In mazaedia-producing genera such as Sphaerophorus, Bunodophoron, and Leifidium, the boundary tissue comprises two distinct layers: an upper zone of aggregated ascogenous hyphae and a lower pseudoparenchymatic zone derived from generative tissue. The pseudoparenchymatic layer is usually strongly pigmented, creating a distinct boundary between the thallus and reproductive structures.

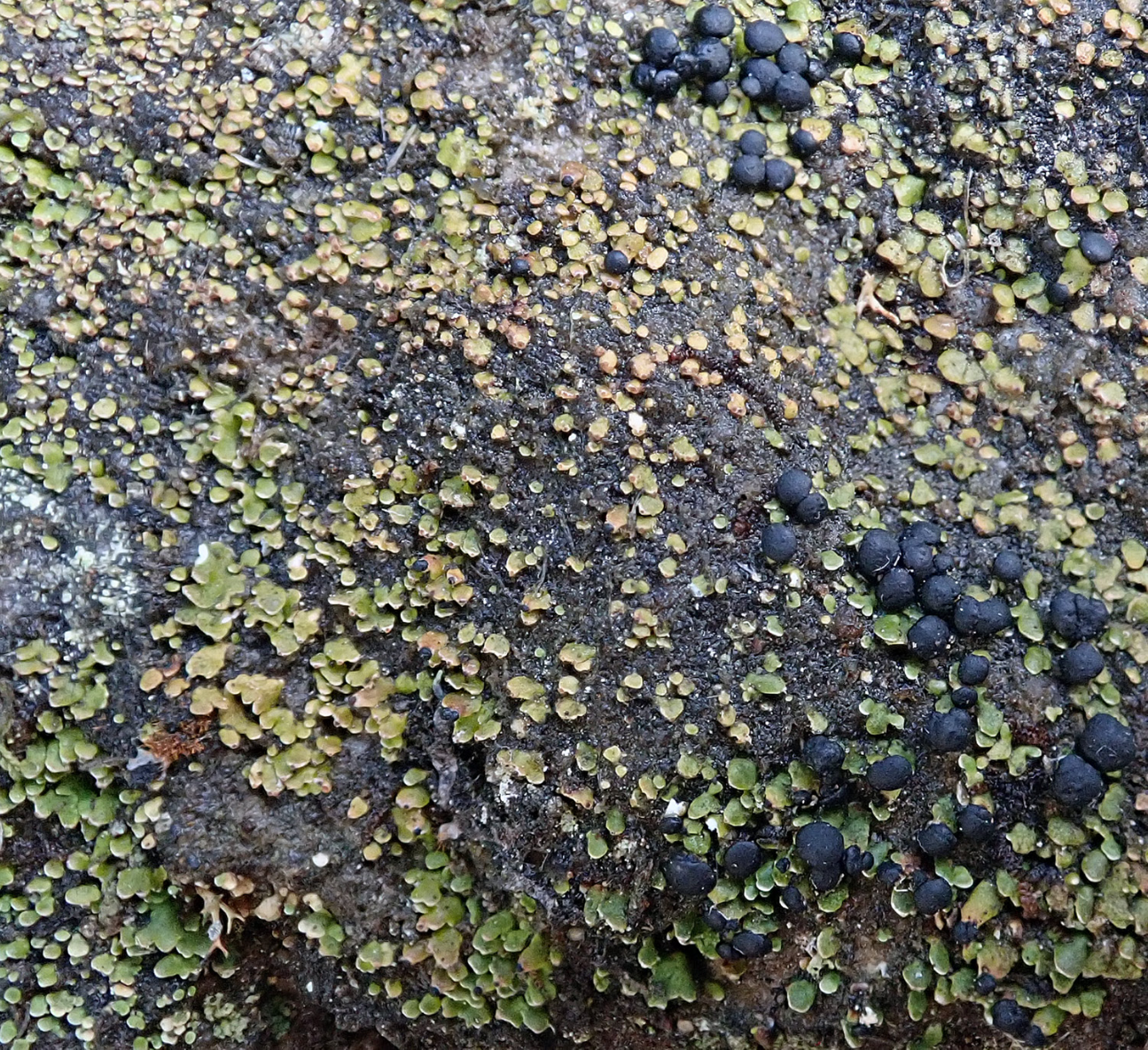
Neophyllis pachyphylla

By contrast, non-mazaedia-producing genera such as Austropeltum and Neophyllis have simpler boundary tissues. Neophyllis exhibits a two-layered boundary tissue similar to mazaedia-producing genera, but with weaker pigmentation, while Austropeltum lacks the generative tissue-derived layer entirely. Despite these variations, the shared developmental origins of the boundary tissue support its homology across the family.

Studies of Leifidium tenerum provide insights into boundary tissue formation. Initially, the ascoma develops as a globose primordium of plasma-rich ascogenous hyphae beneath the thallus cortex. During maturation, the tissue differentiates into a 'watch-glass-like' structure, a characteristic of the family. Similar processes occur in Bunodophoron and Sphaerophorus, though these genera show greater variation in pigmentation and cellular arrangement.

Comparisons with other lichen families highlight the distinctiveness of the Sphaerophoraceae boundary tissue. In Pilophorus, for example, boundary tissue forms from generative hyphae that grow inward from the ascoma margin, differing from the aggregated ascogenous hyphae seen in Sphaerophoraceae. This developmental difference aligns with molecular data that place Pilophorus in Cladoniaceae rather than Sphaerophoraceae.

Boundary tissue structure differs among genera; mazaediate taxa have a well-developed pseudoparenchymatic layer, whereas Austropeltum and Neophyllis have simpler forms.

== Chemistry ==
Members of Sphaerophoraceae produce various distinctive secondary metabolites. A characteristic compound of the family is sphaerophorin, an orcinol depsidone that occurs in most species and is rarely found outside the order Caliciales. Grayanic acid, found in some related lichens, is structurally related to sphaerophorin and can be derived from this depside by the formation of an ether linkage.

Many species produce β-orcinol compounds including depsides and depsidones. For example, some species contain thamnolic and squamatic acids, which can occur in either substitution or additive patterns. Other secondary metabolites found in various species include anthraquinones, dibenzofurane derivatives, and isousnic acid.

The presence and combinations of these compounds can be taxonomically informative. Some species groups are primarily characterised by their chemistry, such as those containing protocetraric acid as a major compound along with specific dibenzofurans found only in their mazaedia, while others are characterised by containing stictic acid and related substances.

== Habitat, distribution, and ecology ==
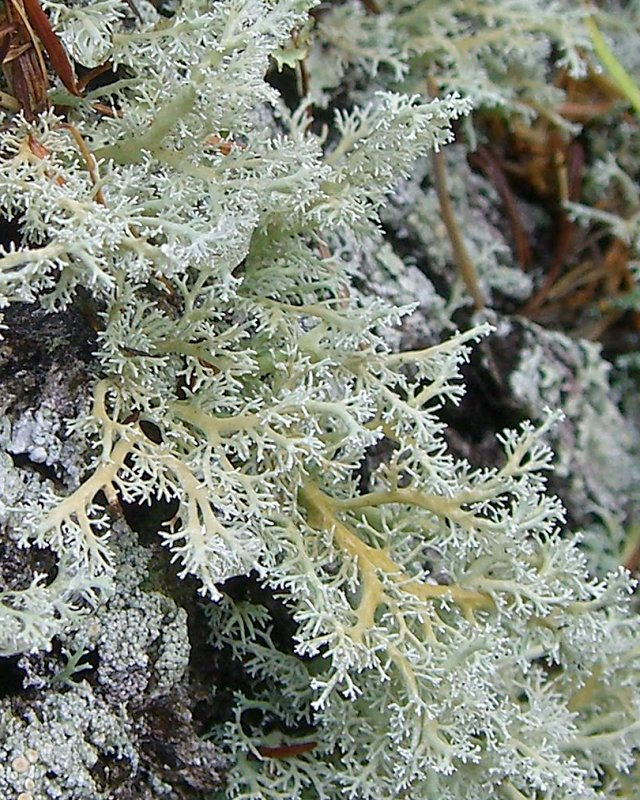
Tree coral (Sphaerophorus globosus) on a rotting conifer log in Shelter Cove, northern California

Members of Sphaerophoraceae show diverse habitat preferences and a broad geographical distribution. The family is particularly well-represented in temperate rainforests of the Southern Hemisphere, highly oceanic regions of the Northern Hemisphere, and high-elevation rainforest areas in tropical and subtropical zones. The family reaches its greatest diversity in the cool and wet Nothofagus forests of the Southern Hemisphere. A few species, notably members of Sphaerophorus, occur in temperate and arctic regions of the Northern Hemisphere. Most species in the family are epiphytes, growing on the bark of trees, though some taxa can be found on rocks or soil. The family shows notable diversity in subantarctic regions and cool temperate forests, with several species exhibiting disjunct distributions between southern South America, Australia, and New Zealand. This pattern is particularly evident in areas dominated by Nothofagus forests.

Some species show specific ecological preferences; for example, late snow-lie habitats and well-lit, humid sites such as near waterfalls. The abundance and reproductive success of some species increase with altitude, correlating with higher rainfall patterns. The family shows various growth strategies and reproductive adaptations to their environments. While sexual reproduction through spore-producing structures is common, some species can also reproduce through fragmentation, particularly those growing in exposed, terrestrial habitats.

Eighteen species of lichenicolous fungi are known to occur on Sphaerophoraceae species.

== Genera ==
Sphaerophoraceae contains 7 genera and 39 species. Following the genus name is the taxonomic authority, year of publication, and the number of species:

- Austropeltum Henssen, H.Döring & Kantvilas (1992) – 1 sp.
- Bunodophoron A.Massal. (1861) – 25 spp.
- Calycidium Stirt. (1877) – 2 spp.
- Gilbertaria M.Svensson & Fryday (2022) – 4 spp.
- Leifidium Wedin (1993) – 1 sp.
- Neophyllis F.Wilson (1891) – 2 spp.
- Sphaerophorus Pers. (1794) – 8 spp.
