= Austropeltum =

Conservation status
- Nationally Vulnerable (NZ TCS)

Scientific classification
- Kingdom: Fungi
- Division: Ascomycota
- Class: Lecanoromycetes
- Order: Lecanorales
- Family: Sphaerophoraceae
- Genus: Austropeltum; Henssen, Döring & Kantvilas (1992)
- Species: A. glareosum

Binomial name
- Austropeltum glareosum Henssen, Döring & Kantvilas (1992)

Genus of fungi

Austropeltum is a fungal genus in the family Sphaerophoraceae. The genus is monotypic, containing the single species Austropeltum glareosum, a squamulose lichen found in Australia and New Zealand.

== Description ==
The lichen typically forms squamulose (small, scale-like) to slightly leafy structures attached to soil by a central holdfast, often with additional anchoring threads (rhizoidal hyphae). Individual lobes (called squamules) range from 4 to 12 mm wide, sometimes reaching up to 15 mm, and typically overlap or cluster densely together. They vary from flat to slightly convex or shell-like, often with raised edges. The upper surface is olive-brown to blackish, appearing smooth, glossy or dull, and may become wrinkled or cracked with age. The lower surface lacks a distinct protective layer (lower cortex), is usually brownish, and sometimes has faint vein-like markings.

A distinctive feature of Austropeltum glareosum is its thick, gelatinous upper cortex, which gradually breaks down with age, becoming cracked and fissured. Microscopically, this cortex consists of a mesh of fungal threads (hyphae) embedded in a gelatinous substance, initially colourless but eventually turning brown near the surface, giving older lobes a darker appearance. Sometimes, this aging process can resemble an infection by a parasitic fungus, but it actually results from the normal aging and pigmentation process of the cortex itself. Occasionally, small structures called goniocysts appear, which are clusters of algal cells encapsulated by brown fungal threads; these are normal features of the lichen rather than signs of disease.

The reproductive structures (apothecia) of this species are particularly unusual. They are black, circular, and appear on short stalks around the edges of the lobes, growing up to 5 mm in diameter. Initially, these apothecia are simple and spherical, but they become increasingly convoluted and split deeply into multiple segments as they mature, eventually resembling clusters of smaller fruiting bodies. Their stalks (pseudopodetia) have a distinctive dark pigmented boundary tissue separating them from the spore-producing layers. Microscopically, the spores are transparent (hyaline), spindle-shaped (fusiform), and measure approximately 11–16 by 3–4.5 μm.

Austropeltum glareosum also has secondary reproductive structures called pycnidia, which produce slender, thread-like conidia (asexual spores). These structures similarly develop along the margins of the lobes, are initially enclosed by a persistent cortex, and release their spores by breaking apart rather than opening through a specific pore. Chemically, this lichen does not contain detectable unique secondary metabolites typically found in many other lichens.

In appearance, Austropeltum glareosum somewhat resembles certain other squamulose lichens such as species of Solenopsora or even small species of Peltigera, though its distinctive black, stalked apothecia set it apart from these groups.

== Conservation status ==
In November 2018 the New Zealand Department of Conservation classified Austropeltum glareosum as "Nationally Vulnerable" with the qualifiers "Data Poor" and "Threatened Overseas" under the New Zealand Threat Classification System.
