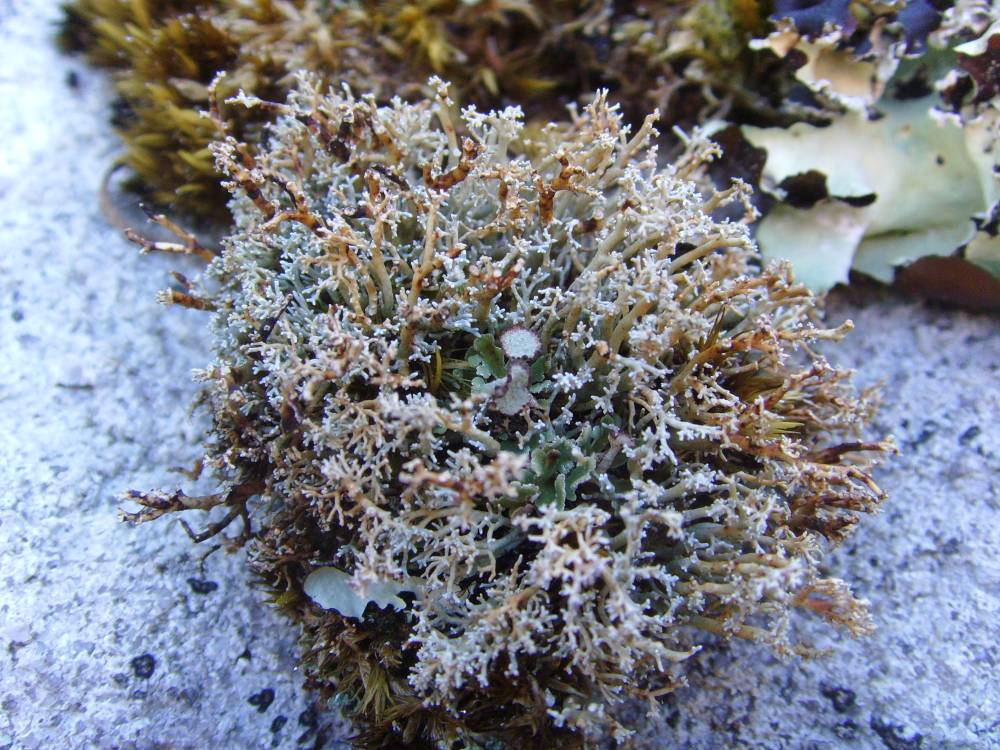
- Sphaerophorus globosus

Scientific classification
- Kingdom: Fungi
- Division: Ascomycota
- Class: Lecanoromycetes
- Order: Lecanorales
- Family: Sphaerophoraceae
- Genus: Sphaerophorus; Pers. (1794)

Type species
- Sphaerophorus coralloides Pers. (1794)

Species
- S. coralloides S. fragilis S. globosus S. imshaugii S. murrayi S. patagonicus S. whakapapaensis S. yangii

Synonyms
- Baeoderma Vain. (1922); Sphaerophoronomyces Cif. & Tomas. (1953); Sphaerophorum Schrad. (1794); Syrigosis Neck. ex Kremp. (1869); Thysanophoron Stirt. (1883)

= Sphaerophorus =

Genus of lichens

Sphaerophorus is a genus of lichenized fungi in the order Lecanorales.

Members of Sphaerophorus are commonly called ball lichens, coral lichens, or tree coral.

According to the Dictionary of the Fungi (10th edition, 2008), the widespread genus contains eight species.
