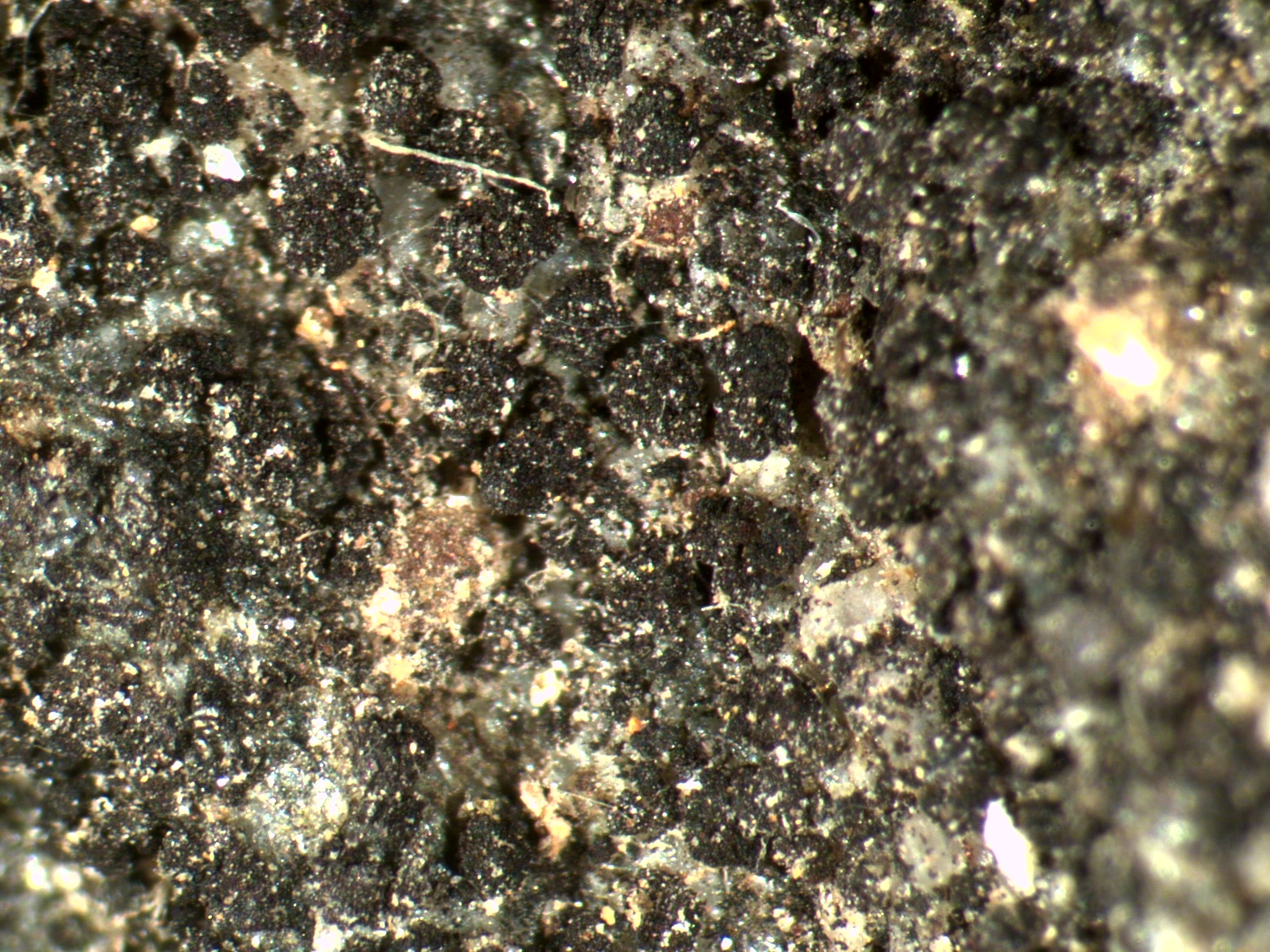

Scientific classification
- Kingdom: Fungi
- Division: Ascomycota
- Class: Lichinomycetes
- Order: Lichinales
- Family: Phylliscaceae
- Genus: Allopyrenis
- Species: A. sanguinea

Binomial name
- Allopyrenis sanguinea (Anzi) M.Schultz & M.Prieto (2024)

Synonyms
- Pyrenopsis sanguinea Anzi (1866); Porocyphus sanguineus (Anzi) Arnold (1872); Psorotichia sanguinea (Anzi) Jatta (1900)

= Allopyrenis sanguinea =

Species of lichen-forming fungus

Allopyrenis sanguinea is a species of lichen-forming fungus in the family Phylliscaceae. It forms a reddish to reddish-black crust on rock that becomes slightly gelatinous and red-brown when wet. The species grows on acidic, exposed rock surfaces near mountain streams in montane to alpine regions of Europe. The lichen has been recorded from the Azores, Austria, Bosnia and Herzegovina, North Macedonia, and Slovakia.

== Taxonomy ==
The species was first described by Martino Anzi in 1866 as Pyrenopsis sanguinea. In his original Latin diagnosis, Anzi described it as having a homogeneous, warted thallus with dark outer surfaces and red internal photobiont cells, along with immersed apothecia and ellipsoid, transparent spores borne eight per ascus. He reported it growing abundantly on serpentine in a sunny, windswept locality at Campello sopra Bormio, at an elevation of 1,500 m above sea level, although fertile specimens were said to be rare.

Matthias Schultz and María Prieto recombined the taxon into the new genus Allopyrenis in 2024, following a molecular phylogenetics-informed reorganization of the class Lichinomycetes.

Older literature identified the cyanobiont (the cyanobacterial photobiont) of Pyrenopsis sanguinea as Gloeocapsa sanguinea, but Bubrick and Galun later noted that cyanobiont determinations made from the lichenized state in the Lichinaceae and Heppiaceae should be treated cautiously, since culture studies revealed substantially greater diversity than had previously been recognized.

The German-language common name for Allopyrenis sanguinea is Rötliche Alpenkruste ('reddish alpine crust').

== Description ==
The thallus of Allopyrenis sanguinea is crustose and becomes slightly gelatinous when wet. It is reddish to reddish black when dry and red-brown when moist, and has a uniform (homoiomerous), tissue-like (paraplectenchymatous) internal structure throughout. The surface is granular to granular-cracked, with more or less rounded, convex patches (areoles) up to 1 mm wide; the upper surface is distinctly rough-grained.

The apothecia (fruiting bodies) are lecanorine in form, at first partly sunken into the thallus and later sitting on the surface (sessile), with a somewhat flask-shaped (perithecioid) appearance. They are 0.25–0.4 mm wide and have a dark red-brown disc that is initially pore-like but soon opens and becomes flat, surrounded by a distinct, persistent, granular thalline margin. Under the microscope, the spore-bearing layer (hymenium) is colourless, 70–75 μm high, and stains blue with iodine, while the asci (spore sacs) are club-shaped (cylindrical-clavate), contain eight spores, and have a conspicuous blue-staining cap at the tip. The ascospores are colourless, single-celled, and broadly ellipsoid, measuring (5–)6–8(–11) × 5–6 μm. Pycnidia (asexual fruiting structures) are partly sunken into thalline warts and produce ellipsoid conidia (asexual spores) about 3 × 1–1.5 μm. The photobiont is a chroococcoid cyanobacterium with solitary cells enclosed in reddish-violet, layered gelatinous sheaths 10–20 μm wide including the sheath. All standard chemical spot tests are negative, and no lichen products have been detected.

== Distribution ==
Allopyrenis sanguinea grows on acidic, exposed substrates with running water or on occasionally inundated margins of mountain streams. The species is known from montane to alpine regions of Europe and is probably more widely distributed in central Europe. The lichen has been recorded from high elevations in the Azores, Austria, Bosnia and Herzegovina, North Macedonia, and Slovakia.
