= Edwardiella =

Scientific classification
- Kingdom: Fungi
- Division: Ascomycota
- Class: Lichinomycetes
- Order: Lichinales
- Family: Lichinellaceae
- Genus: Edwardiella; Henssen (1986)
- Species: E. mirabilis

Binomial name
- Edwardiella mirabilis Henssen (1986)

Genus of fungi

Edwardiella is a fungal genus in the family Lichinellaceae. This is a monotypic genus, containing the single species Edwardiella mirabilis. Aino Henssen named the genus after the Prince Edward Islands, the type locality of the type species.

In a 2024 multilocus molecular phylogenetics-informed re-classification of the Lichinomycetes, Edwardiella was placed in the newly erected family Lichinellaceae alongside Gonotichia, Lichinella and Synalissina. In that treatment the genus comprises E. mirabilis and is grouped with taxa characterised at family level by thallinocarpous ascomata and a Lichinella-type ascus.
