= Allopyrenis tenuis =

Scientific classification
- Kingdom: Fungi
- Division: Ascomycota
- Class: Lichinomycetes
- Order: Lichinales
- Family: Phylliscaceae
- Genus: Allopyrenis
- Species: A. tenuis

Binomial name
- Allopyrenis tenuis (Henssen) M.Schultz & M.Prieto (2024)

Synonyms
- Phylliscum tenue Henssen (1963)

Species of lichen-forming fungus

Allopyrenis tenuis is a species of squamulose lichen-forming fungus in the family Phylliscaceae. It was first described as a new species in 1963 by Aino Henssen, as Phylliscum tenue. The type of Phylliscum tenue was collected by Henssen in Humboldt County, California, at about 1,000 m (3,280 ft) elevation. The specimen was gathered from seepage-streaked exposed volcanic rock. Matthias Schultz and María Prieto recombined the taxon into the new genus Allopyrenis in 2024, following a molecular phylogenetics-informed reorganization of the class Lichinomycetes.

It has dark reddish-brown, roughly rounded squamules measuring about 0.5–0.75 mm across. The thallus surface is granulose because it is covered with clusters of lichenized cyanobacterial cells, about 20–50 μm wide; it lacks both lobules and surface areoles. Its fruiting bodies (apothecia) are small, about 200–250 μm wide, and sessile, with a prominent thalline margin but no proper exciple. The asci are club-shaped with rounded tips. In young apothecia, only a few primary paraphyses are present, and the discs are punctiform or only slightly opened.

Initially described from specimens collected in California, and later found in Alaska, it has also been recorded from Venezuela.
