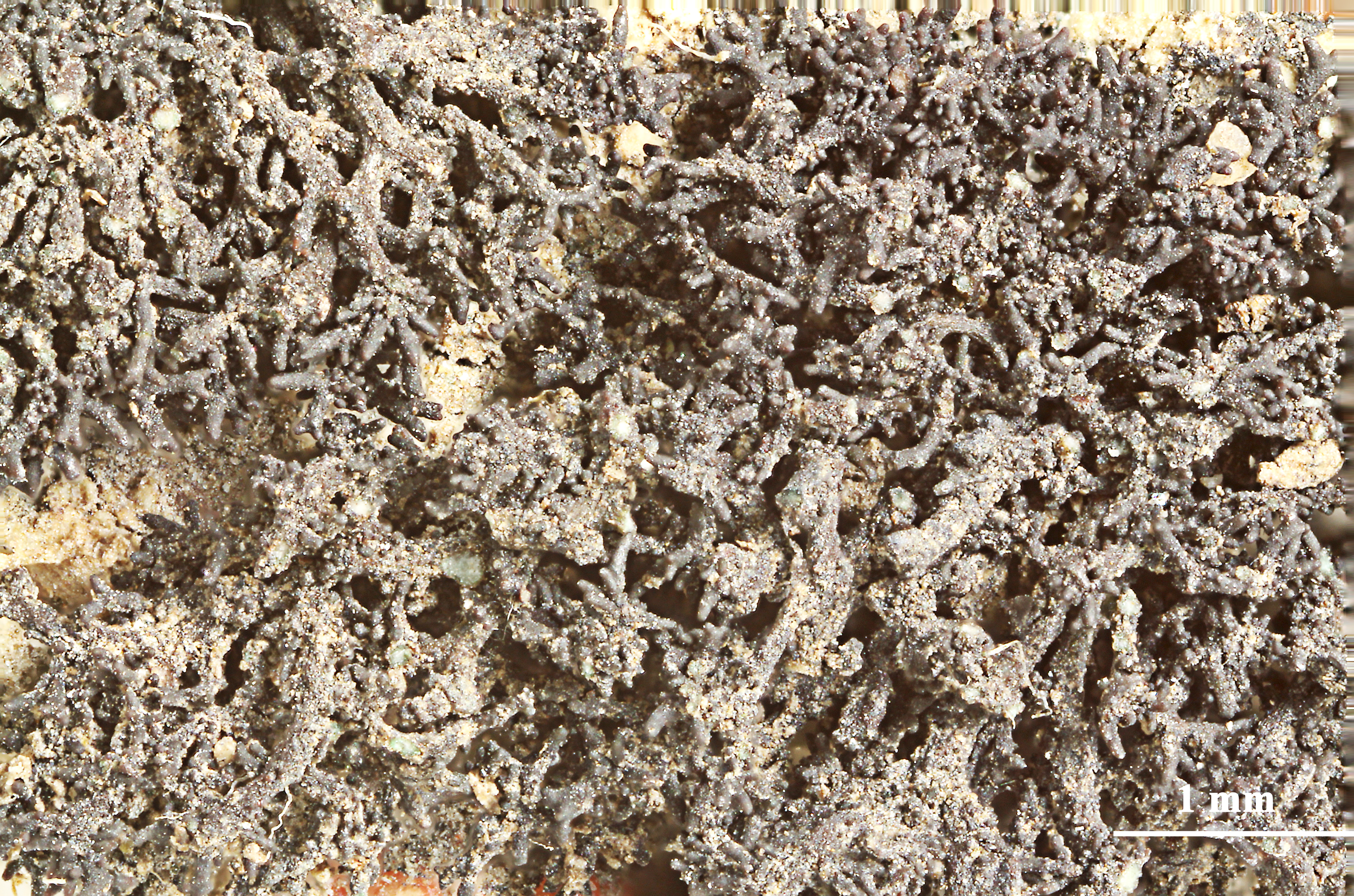

Scientific classification
- Kingdom: Fungi
- Division: Ascomycota
- Class: Lichinomycetes
- Order: Lichinales
- Family: Lichinellaceae
- Genus: Lichinella
- Species: L. iodopulchra

Binomial name
- Lichinella iodopulchra (Couderc ex Croz.) P.P.Moreno & Egea (1992)

Synonyms
- Omphalaria iodopulchra Couderc ex Croz. (1910); Thyrea iodopulchra (Couderc ex Croz.) Zahlbr. (1924); Gonohymenia iodopulchra (Couderc ex Croz.) Henssen & P.M.Jørg. (1990)

= Lichinella iodopulchra =

Species of lichen

Lichinella iodopulchra is a species of saxicolous (rock-dwelling) gelatinous lichen in the family Lichinellaceae. The species is characterised by its small, rosette-shaped growth form and distinctive chemical reaction to iodine staining, which causes the thallus to turn bright red and then violet. It has a broad distribution across warm regions, including southwestern North America, the Mediterranean basin, North Africa, and parts of the Middle East. The lichen forms a symbiotic partnership with cyanobacteria rather than green algae, which allows it to photosynthesise and survive in harsh, sun-exposed rocky environments.

== Taxonomy ==
The lichen was first described by the French lichenologists George Couderc and André de Crozals in 1910, as Omphalaria jodopulchra. They found the species growing on limestone rocks exposed to sunlight, approximately 400 metres above sea level in the southeast area of Laurens station in southern France. They noted that under the influence of iodine staining, the thallus quickly turns bright red, and upon washing, this red colour changes to violet. They observed that this distinctive iodine reaction appears to be unique to Omphalaria iodopulchra among the then-known Omphalaria species, and considered it a key identifying characteristic of this lichen. Alexander Zahlbruckner transferred the species to the genus Thyrea in 1924. In 1990, Aino Henssen and Per Magnus Jørgensen transferred the species to Gonohymenia, creating the new combination Gonohymenia iodopulchra. In making this transfer, they corrected the spelling back to "iodopulchra" from Zahlbruckner's "jodopulchra", and they also designated a lectotype from the original collection made by Crozals in 1908 from limestone rocks 300 metres below and on the opposite side of Laurens station in Hérault, France. This lectotype specimen is housed at the herbarium of the Missouri Botanical Garden. The species was reclassified once more in 1992 when the genus Gonohymenia was subsumed into synonymy with Lichinella, resulting in the current name Lichinella iodopulchra.

North American usage long confused this species with Thyrea pulvinata in the sense of Edward Tuckerman and Bruce Fink (now T. confusa). Lichinella iodopulchra differs in having polysporous asci (containing many spores) and thalli that are seldom pruinose; it also occurs on both calcareous and siliceous rocks, whereas T. confusa is largely confined to calcareous substrates. Schultz treated the variable North American material in a broad sense pending revision against several Eurasian segregates.

== Description ==
Lichinella iodopulchra forms small, rosette-like growths on rock surfaces, with individual rosettes 5–20 mm across, built from contiguous lobules whose margins often curve downward to form a subtle rim. The thallus (the main body of the lichen) is flat and closely attached to the substrate, with a surface that appears smooth to finely granular on both upper and lower sides. The edges are distinctly ridged and pressed tightly against the rock surface, creating characteristic pleated folds as the lichen develops.

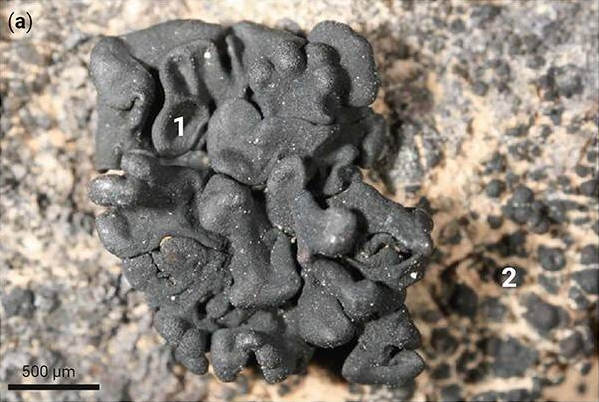
A rosette of Lichinella iodopulchra (1) growing along the crustose Forssellia canariensis (2) on a rock in the Canary Islands; scale bar=0.5 mm

The thallus is divided into distinct sections by narrow grooves 600–800 μm wide. Each section is formed by tightly packed, short cellular filaments that are predominantly arranged in a radial pattern. The medulla (inner tissue layer) consists of a loose network of branching filaments measuring 1.5–2.5 micrometres (μm) in width. Photobiont cells (the algal partner that provides nutrients through photosynthesis) are spherical or slightly oval, measuring 4–6 × 2–5 μm, and are distributed in dense, closely packed layers throughout the thallus interior.

The fruiting bodies are located at or near the margins of the thallus and measure 2–4.6 mm in diameter. These structures appear sunken or only slightly raised above the surface, with an irregularly grooved appearance. The outer layer is 20–50 μm thick and divided into compartments by algal filaments that penetrate from the underlying tissue in a wedge-like pattern. This creates chambers that open to the surface through sterile filaments from the subhymenium (the layer beneath the reproductive tissue). Thallinocarpic fruiting bodies are usually immersed to slightly raised and can be hard to see; wetting the thallus helps, as sterile parts darken green whereas fertile portions show a paler, brownish tinge. Juvenile rosettes can resemble small, smooth Lichinella cribellifera, which generally has more obvious radial ridges on larger lobes.

Asci (spore-containing sacs) are club-shaped and measure 30–40 μm in length. The ascospores are ellipsoidal and colourless, measuring 5–9 × 3–5 μm. Asexual reproductive structures called pycnidia are present as small, spherical or pear-shaped bodies up to 200 μm in diameter, containing ellipsoidal conidia (asexual spores) measuring 2–3 × 1–1.5 μm.

== Habitat and distribution ==
Lichinella iodopulchra is a saxicolous cyanolichen that grows directly on rock, occurring on both calcareous and siliceous substrates; specimens have been documented on exposed granite outcrops in the semi-arid Caatinga of north-eastern Brazil. In the Sonoran Desert region it occupies sun-exposed desert rock faces, and regional accounts treat it under a broad species concept when summarising its ecology. In the Southwestern United States, most collections are from steep, inclined, shaded rock faces, often on north-northwest exposures and along seepage tracks, and the species is fairly common inland but mostly absent from coastal localities.

The species has a broad, mainly warm-region (temperate) distribution. In North America it is recorded from the south-western United States and north-western Mexico (with specific Sonoran occurrences in Arizona and Baja California Sur); in Macaronesia it is recorded from the Canary Islands; in the Mediterranean basin it occurs in south-eastern Spain and in North Africa (including Algeria); it extends through the Middle East (e.g., Iran) and into the Caucasus (Georgia); and it has been verified from north-eastern Brazil.
