= Allopyrenis =

Scientific classification
- Kingdom: Fungi
- Division: Ascomycota
- Class: Lichinomycetes
- Order: Lichinales
- Family: Phylliscaceae
- Genus: Allopyrenis; M.Schultz & M.Prieto (2024)

Type species
- Allopyrenis sanguinea (Anzi) M.Schultz & M.Prieto (2024)

Species
- A. grumulifera A. haemaleella A. impolita A. phaeococca A. reducta A. sanguinea A. tenuis

Genus of lichens

Allopyrenis is a genus of rock-dwelling cyanolichens (lichens that partner with cyanobacteria rather than green algae) in the family Phylliscaceae (order Lichinales). The genus was introduced in 2024 during a broad re-classification of the class Lichinomycetes; its type species is Allopyrenis sanguinea. Seven species, most of them long treated in Pyrenopsis, were transferred to Allopyrenis to reflect new phylogenetic results.

== Taxonomy ==
The genus Allopyrenis was circumscribed by Matthias Schultz and María Prieto in a multilocus study that re‑evaluated family‑ and genus‑level limits across the Lichinomycetes. That study used DNA evidence in combination with key morphological characters (particularly how the fruiting bodies develop and the type of asci) to redefine natural groups. The authors created Allopyrenis for a clade of Pyrenopsis‑like cyanolichens in Phylliscaceae and made the necessary new combinations. The name Allopyrenis (allo‑ = other) explicitly acknowledges its resemblance to Pyrenopsis while indicating it represents a distinct evolutionary lineage. Phylliscaceae is a family of mainly minute, rock-dwelling cyanolichens within the order Lichinales. Members commonly form thin crusts or tiny rosettes on sun‑exposed rock, an ecological profile that matches the species now treated in Allopyrenis.

== Description ==
Species of Allopyrenis are crustose lichens (thin, tightly attached crusts on rock) that often look reddish‑brown to nearly black when dry and become slightly gelatinous when wet. The thallus (the lichen body) is typically very thin and granulose (broken into fine, grain‑like patches) or areolate (split into small, tile‑like segments).

The sexual fruiting bodies are apothecia, which in this group are minute and may remain pinprick sized. They are usually lecanorine, meaning the rim of the disc is formed by thallus tissue (a thalline margin) rather than by a separate ring of fungal tissue. In Allopyrenis, a distinct proper exciple (a cup‑like rim of purely fungal tissue) is lacking. The asci are club‑shaped and have a conspicuous gelatinised apical cap—features consistent with other members of Phylliscaceae. No lichen products have been identified in the genus.

The photobiont partner is a chroococcoid (coccoid) cyanobacterium, often described as Gloeocapsa‑like. This cyanobacterial partnership is typical for the family and helps these tiny crusts tolerate strong sun and periodic drying on exposed rock.

== Ecology and distribution ==
Species of Allopyrenis are saxicolous (rock-dwelling) and favour well‑lit rock, often on siliceous substrates, sometimes along damp seepage lines. Records show a mainly temperate Northern Hemisphere distribution, with examples in north‑western and alpine Europe and in North America.

== Species ==
Seven species are currently included in Allopyrenis (all as new combinations published in 2024):

- Allopyrenis grumulifera (Nyl.) M.Schultz & M.Prieto (2024)
- Allopyrenis haemaleella (Nyl.) M.Schultz & M.Prieto (2024)
- Allopyrenis impolita Th.Fr. ex M.Schultz & M.Prieto (2024)
- Allopyrenis phaeococca (Tuck.) M.Schultz & M.Prieto (2024)
- Allopyrenis reducta (Th.Fr.) M.Schultz & M.Prieto (2024)
- Allopyrenis sanguinea (Anzi) M.Schultz & M.Prieto (2024)
- Allopyrenis tenuis (Henssen) M.Schultz & M.Prieto (2024)
