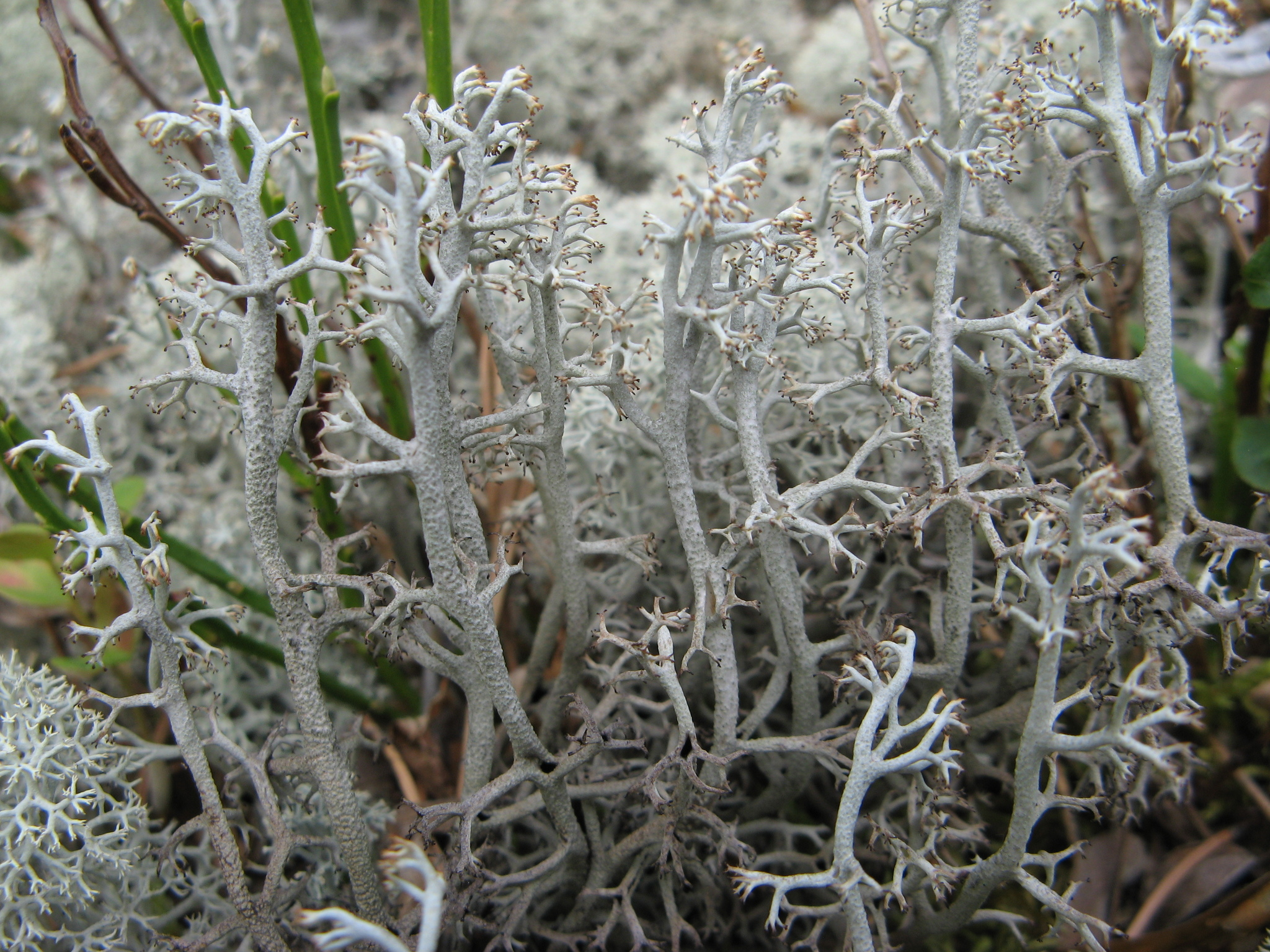

Conservation status
- Secure (NatureServe)

Scientific classification
- Kingdom: Fungi
- Division: Ascomycota
- Class: Lecanoromycetes
- Order: Lecanorales
- Family: Cladoniaceae
- Genus: Cladonia
- Species: C. stygia

Binomial name
- Cladonia stygia (Fr.) Ruoss (1985)

Synonyms
- List: Cladonia rangiferina f. stygia Fr. (1826); Cladina rangiferina f. stygia (Fr.) H.Olivier (1907); Cladina stygia (Fr.) Ahti (1984); Cenomyce rangiferina var. curta Ach. (1810); Cenomyce gonorega f. scabrosa Ach. (1814); Cladonia rangiferina f. curta (Ach.) Britzelm. (1906); Cladonia degenerans f. scabrosa (Ach.) Flörke (1828); Cenomyce squamosa var. scabrosa (Ach.) Delise (1830); Cladonia squamosa var. scabrosa (Ach.) Grognot (1863)

= Cladonia stygia =

Species of lichen

Cladonia stygia, commonly known as the black‐footed reindeer lichen, is a species of fruticose lichen in the family Cladoniaceae. It is distributed across boreal, arctic and temperate regions of the Northern Hemisphere. Originally described by Elias Magnus Fries in 1826 as a form of Cladonia rangiferina, subsequent studies on its morphology and chemistry led to its elevation to full species status in 1985. The lichen is recognised by its dark, ash-grey to black base and its distinctive, uneven branching pattern, often accompanied by small red reproductive structures. It typically grows in wet, acidic bogs and montane areas, where it contributes to local ecosystem functions and serves as a winter food source for reindeer.

Molecular studies have confirmed C. stygia as distinct from C. rangiferina, supported by structural and chemical differences. This lichen contributes to soil insulation and serves as a host for various lichenicolous fungi. Although C. stygia is widespread in boreal regions, it is considered endangered in some areas, for example in parts of Germany, where habitat loss and ecological changes pose significant threats. Conservation efforts, including habitat management and lichen transplantation, have been implemented to safeguard this ecologically important species.

== Taxonomy ==
Cladonia stygia was first described by Elias Magnus Fries in 1826, originally classified as a form of Cladonia rangiferina. In his description in Nova Schedulae Criticae Lichenum, Fries characterised it as a form found in the bogs of western Småland, Sweden, where it formed wide, compact layers 1–2 feet tall. He noted its distinctive blackened lower portions spotted with white, which he described as "mortified-black with white spots" extending down to where it merged with the peat. For many years it was treated as an infraspecific taxon of C. rangiferina until Engelbert Ruoss elevated it to species status in 1985. Moreover, the species has been placed in the segregate genus Cladina, as Cladina stygia (Fr.) Ahti, reflecting ongoing debate regarding the taxonomic rank of reindeer lichens. The type specimen was originally described from bogs in Småland, Sweden; however, the original material has been lost, and a neotype (replacement type specimen designated when the original is lost) was later selected from Södermanland, Sweden.

Early lichenologists attributed the blackening (melanisation) of C. stygia's tissues to environmental influences—such as prolonged exposure to stagnant water in bog habitats—rather than recognising it as a taxonomically significant character. This view, promoted by Rutger Sernander and Heinrich Sandstede in the early 20th century, persisted until detailed studies in the 1980s demonstrated that melanisation is a consistent taxonomic trait, correlating with other distinctive features such as the red pycnidial slime.

Cladonia stygia belongs to the group of reindeer lichens, which have been treated either as the genus Cladina or as a subgenus of Cladonia. Within this group, C. stygia exhibits characteristics of both section Tenues—comprising species that produce red pycnidial slime—and section Cladina, which includes C. rangiferina. Its closest relatives may include an undescribed species from the northern Andes that shows similar melanisation but differs in branching pattern.

A 2015 study employing DNA barcoding techniques demonstrated that although C. stygia and C. rangiferina are distinct, they cannot be reliably differentiated using solely the internal transcribed spacer (ITS) region—the standard fungal DNA barcode. Instead, the mitochondrial small subunit (mtSSU) proved more effective for distinguishing between the two species. This research provided both genetic and morphological evidence confirming that C. stygia represents a distinct species from C. rangiferina. Phylogenetic analyses place C. stygia within the Tenues clade alongside C. subtenuis and C. rangiferina. Despite sharing similar branch architecture with species such as C. arbuscula, it is distinguished by its unique chemistry and surface structure.

Although molecular analyses confirm that C. stygia and C. rangiferina are distinct, their genetic relationship appears complex. Evidence of homoplasy has been observed, and while significant genetic differences exist, the overall differentiation is relatively low. This suggests that the two species may be in the early stages of speciation—a conclusion that is consistent with their overlapping habitats and ecological differences (C. stygia preferring wetter conditions, and C. rangiferina favouring drier sites).

Cladonia stygia is commonly known as the "black‐footed reindeer lichen". It is known by various names in North Germanic languages that reference its dark colouration: in Danish as styg rensdyrlav (ugly reindeer lichen), in Finnish as sysiporonjäkälä (coal reindeer lichen), in Norwegian as svartfotreinlav (black-foot reindeer lichen), and in Swedish as svart renlav (black reindeer lichen).

== Description ==
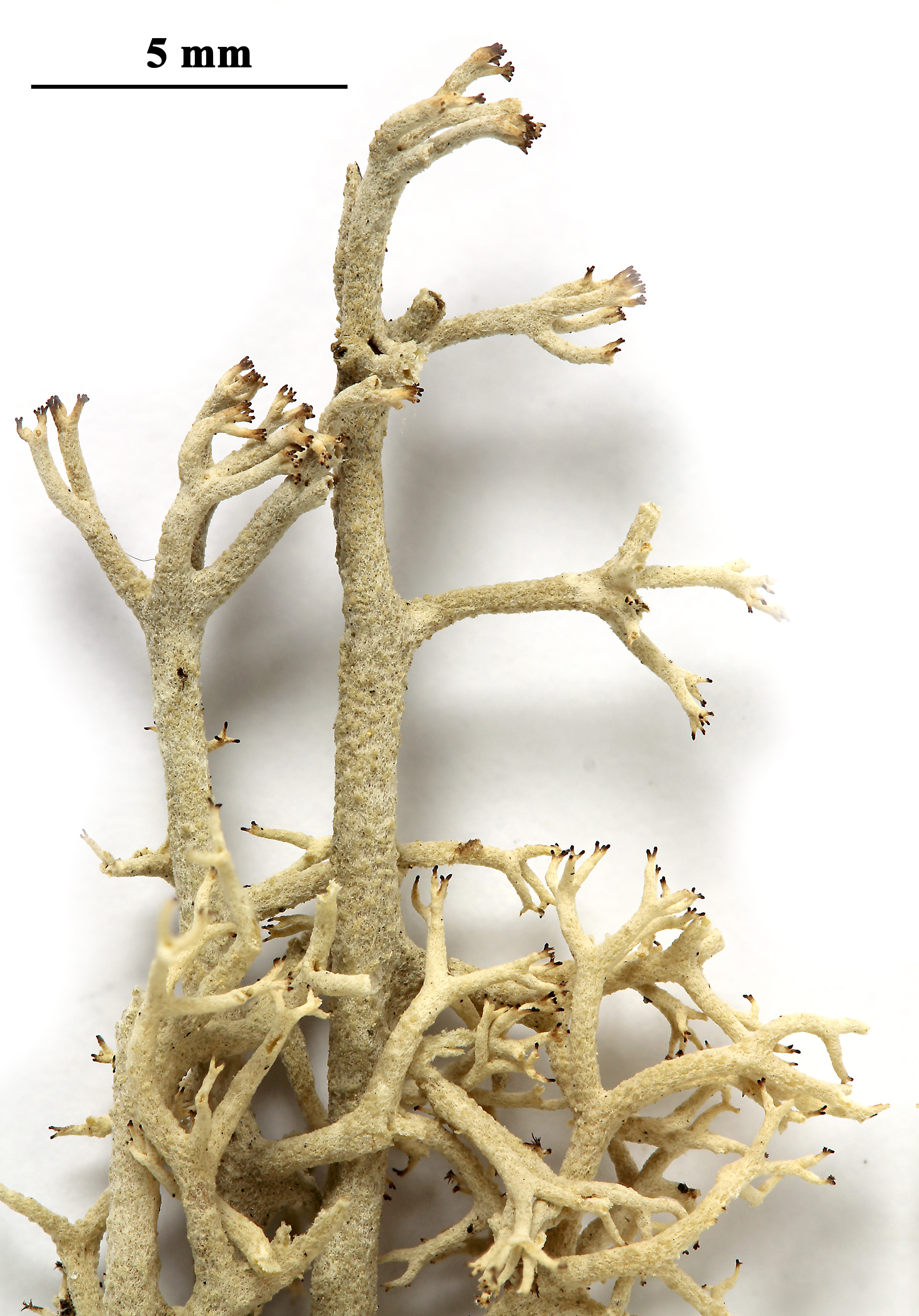
Close-up showing the characteristic branching pattern of a podetium, displaying the distinctive dark basal portion and lighter, forked terminal branches. Scale bar = 5 mm

Like other members of its genus, C. stygia has a two-part (dimorphic) structure: it begins life with a crust-like layer growing on the substrate, but this eventually disappears as the more prominent upright, branching structures (the podetia) develop. The lichen is distinguished by several characteristic features of its structure. The podetia typically reach heights of 5–15 cm tall, occasionally reaching 30 cm, with the living (active) portion measuring up to 10 cm. The main stem is about 1 mm thick, with segments between branches about 5 mm long. The branching pattern is distinctive, typically dividing into three unequal branches (anisotomic trichotomous), though sometimes splitting into four or two branches. Where the branches divide, they form small holes or perforations called axils. The base of its branches shows a distinctive ash-grey to black colouration on the inside. This dark background is dotted with irregular patches of greenish-white outer tissue (known as the ectal layer), creating a distinctive speckled appearance. These patches often have uneven edges and can sometimes appear almost scale-like. While this mottled, darkened area typically covers the lower half of the branches, in some specimens it may be limited to just the very base. When wet, the lichen can take on an olive-grey colouration. The podetia of C. stygia often have a distinctive curvature near the tips, giving them a characteristic hooked or walking cane-like appearance. In contrast to the relatively smooth podetia of C. rangiferina, C. stygia has a notably wartier surface texture—a feature that assists in field identification. Another difference is its darker olive-green colouration in the upper podetia when moist, in contrast to the more uniform greyish tones of C. rangiferina.

The upper portions of the branches also have distinctive features. The terminal and near-terminal branches have a relatively rough surface texture with a felty but loosely fibrous covering, and they typically taper gradually to pointed tips. The branch tips are notably darkened and strongly deflexed to one side. The internal structure of the branches consists of several layers: the wall measures 225–275 micrometres (μm) in thickness, with a delicate cobweb-like surface layer (called the arachnoid layer) of 25–50 μm. One additional identifying feature is the red colour of its reproductive structures (called pycnidia), though this characteristic is rarely visible and can be difficult to observe in the field.

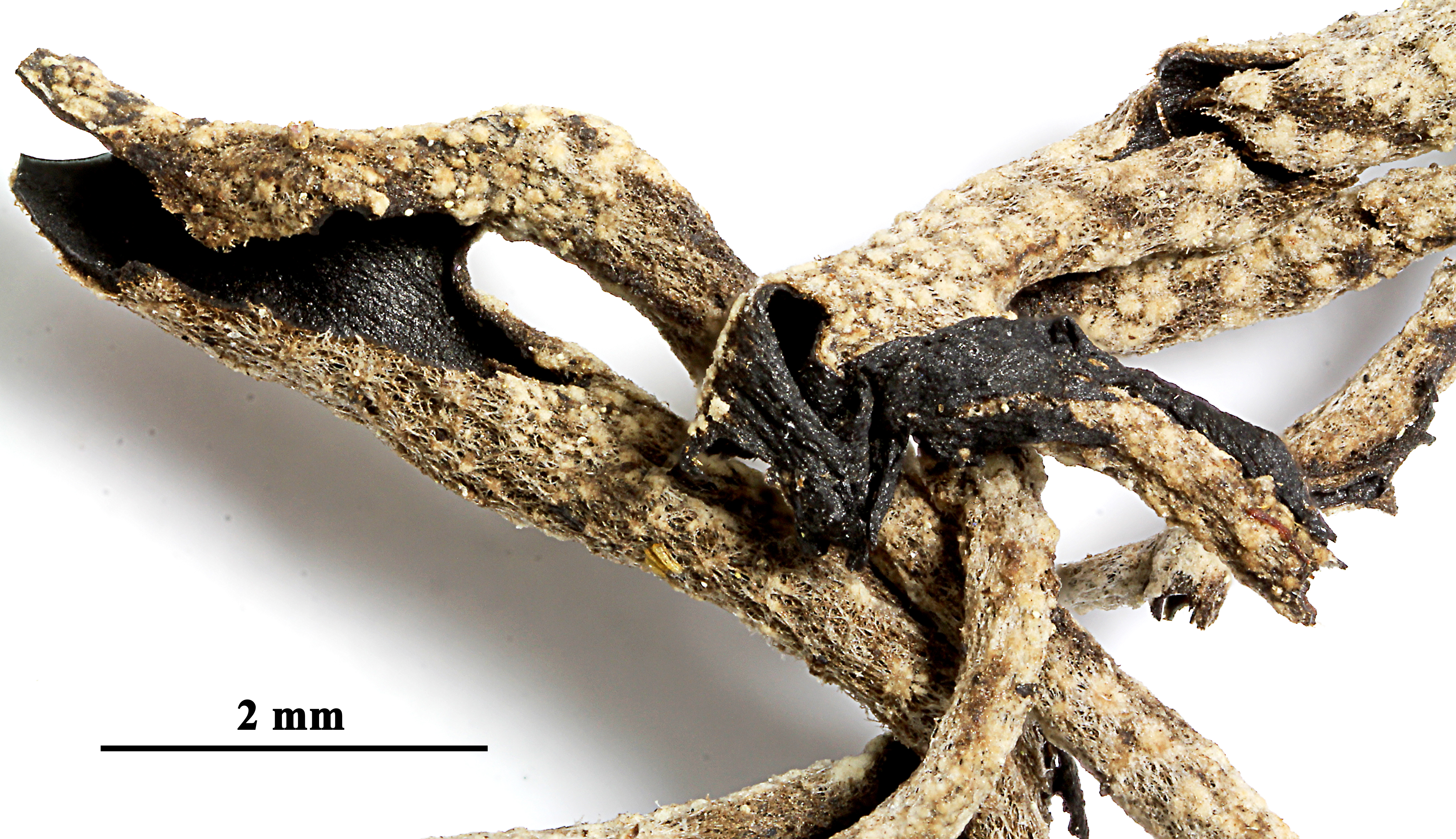
Close-up detail showing the distinctive black medulla visible in the axils (branch junctions) and breaks in the outer cortex, a key diagnostic feature of this species. Scale bar = 2 mm

The species reproduces through several structures. It commonly produces disc-shaped reproductive bodies (called hymenial discs) that appear in clusters at the branch tips. These discs are 0.5–0.8 mm wide, have a convex shape, and range from medium to dark brown in colour. The spores produced by these discs are simple, colourless (hyaline), and range from oblong to needle-shaped (fusiform to acicular), measuring 9–12 by 2.5–3 μm. The species also produces separate reproductive structures called conidiomata, which measure 150–200 by 100–110 μm and contain a distinctive red slime.

These features help distinguish C. stygia from the similar-looking C. rangiferina. While both species show some darkening at the base, C. rangiferina tends to have a more uniform brownish colouration rather than the speckled black-grey pattern of C. stygia. C. rangiferina also differs in having smoother branch surfaces and shorter, blunter branch tips. Other similar species include C. arbuscula, C. mitis, and C. stellaris, which can be distinguished from C. stygia by their yellow-green colouration and a negative K− spot test, indicating the presence of usnic acid and absence of atranorin.

== Chemistry ==
The lichen produces several distinctive secondary metabolites. Its major components include fumarprotocetraric acid and atranorin (though atranorin is occasionally absent), along with smaller amounts of protocetraric acid. Chemical spot tests reveal characteristic reactions: the thallus turns bright red with PD (p-phenylenediamine) and pale yellow with K (potassium hydroxide solution). The distinctive black colouration that develops in its dead tissues is due to the production of melanins, similar to those found in many other fungi.

The species contains several carotenoids, with β-carotene, β-cryptoxanthin, and lutein epoxide being consistently present across specimens collected from different geographic locations. These compounds were identified through detailed chromatographic analysis of specimens from 15 different localities across multiple continents. Unlike some related Cladonia species, C. stygia shows relatively little variation in its carotenoid composition between specimens. Most samples also contained α-carotene, though in lower concentrations than the other carotenoids. The total carotenoid content in analysed specimens ranged from about 9 to 20 micrograms per gram (μg/g) of lichen dry weight.

Chemical analysis using gas chromatography-mass spectrometry (GC-MS) has shown that C. stygia contains several common lichen metabolites including polyols (arabitol, ribitol, mannitol), monosaccharides (fructose, glucose, mannose), disaccharides (sucrose, trehalose), organic acids (malonic, succinic, citric), and free fatty acids (palmitic, oleic, linolenic). The species also contains an amino acid (oxoproline) and various lichen-specific compounds including quinones, xanthones, and triterpenes. Metabolite profiling can help distinguish C. stygia from the closely related C. rangiferina.

== Habitat and distribution ==
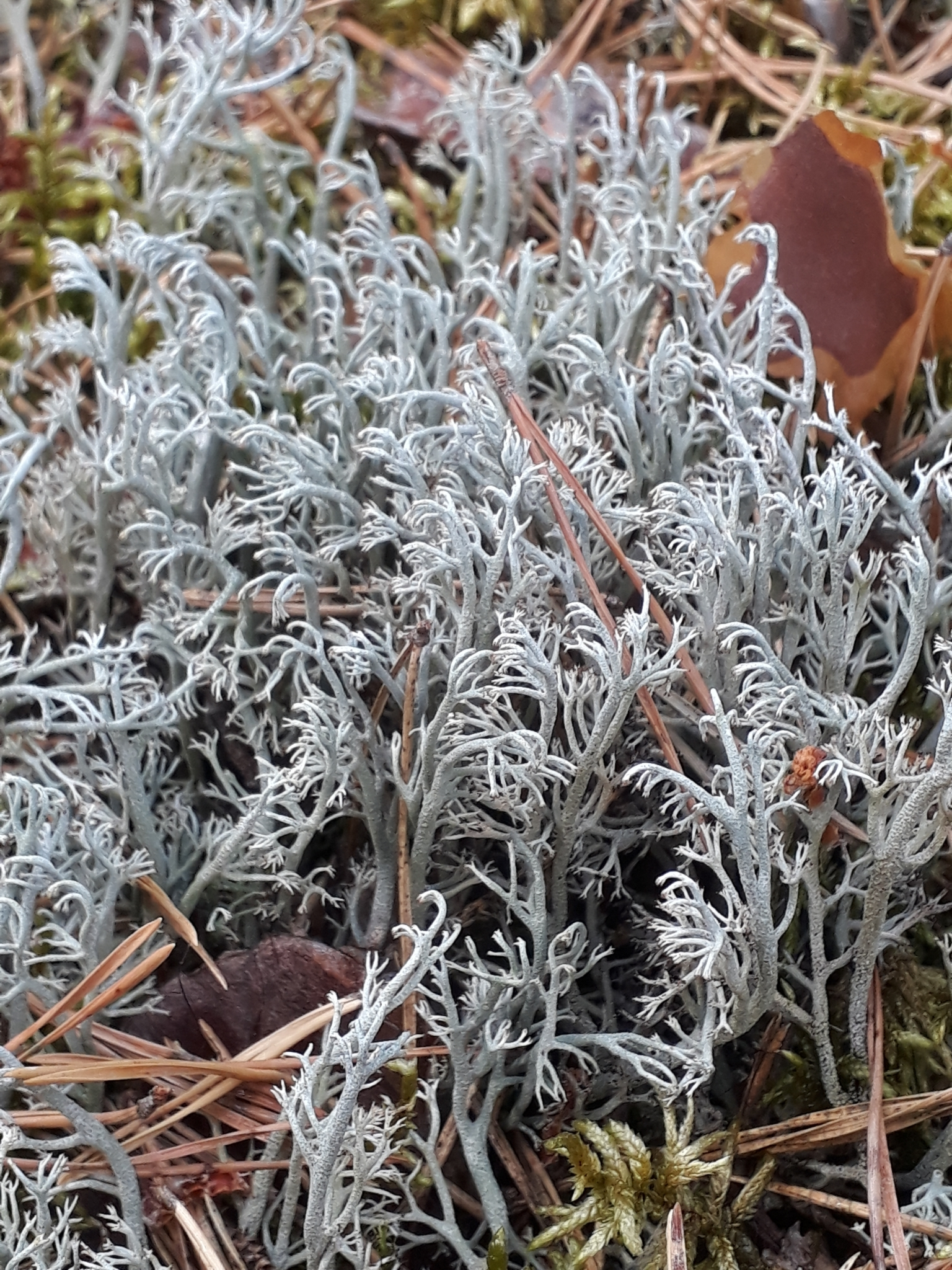
Cladonia stygia

Cladonia stygia is widespread across the Northern Hemisphere but has a fragmented distribution in some regions. In Germany, although the species was recorded in Lower Saxony as early as 1908, it was not observed again until 2012—when new populations were discovered in the lichen‐rich pine forests of the Carrenziener Dünen. Since then, conservation efforts, including experimental lichen reintroduction, have successfully established additional populations within the dune system, where C. stygia co-occurs with other reindeer lichens such as C. portentosa, C. arbuscula, and C. rangiferina. It has also been confirmed in parts of Central Europe – including Germany (with recent reports from the federal state of Hesse) and the Czech Republic – as well as in Canada, Finland, and parts of Asia, suggesting a broad boreal or circumboreal distribution. In the Alps, it occurs from valley bottoms to the subalpine belt (mainly between 300 and 2400 m elevation), but is relatively rare and restricted to raised bogs. It has been documented across multiple Alpine regions, including parts of Austria, Germany, Switzerland, France, Italy, and Slovenia. Although primarily a boreal species, C. stygia extends into both arctic and temperate zones, becoming increasingly restricted to specialised habitats at its southern limits, for example in isolated mountain ranges such as the European Alps and the Blue Ridge Mountains in Virginia. It is widespread in Greenland and Svalbard.

In the United Kingdom, C. stygia was recorded in the 19th century from the Scottish Highlands (Braemar) and Wales (Merioneth and Snowdonia). More recent records confirm its presence in Wales (Cardigan) and Scotland (E. Perthshire and Caithness). Elsewhere in Europe, the species has been confirmed in Andorra, Italy, Portugal, Slovenia, and Turkey, where it is typically found on acid soils in montane and subalpine areas. Its southernmost European occurrence has been recorded in Portugal's western Sistema Central mountains. The species is considered endangered in Italy, although data on its population status there remains incomplete. Cladonia stygia was definitively excluded from the Southern Hemisphere funga in 1990. Furthermore, although it is primarily found in peatlands, C. stygia also occurs on rock outcroppings in woods (particularly in southern Finland) and in Pinus sylvestris-Cladina woodlands further north, where it typically covers only 1–3% of the ground surface. In Germany, populations also occur in montane and high montane zones between 650 and 900 m elevation, favouring air‐humid, cool sites such as basalt blockfields and high moors. Given the historical difficulties in distinguishing C. stygia from similar species, particularly C. rangiferina, its full distribution remains uncertain. Molecular studies have since confirmed its presence in regions where it was previously overlooked or misidentified. Due to its role in boreal ecosystems and its status as the only lichen taxon protected under EU legislation, populations of C. stygia are important for conservation monitoring, although challenges in field identification often require molecular verification for accurate population assessments.

== Ecology ==
In boreal and subarctic regions, Cladonia stygia is ecologically significant. Like other reindeer lichens, Cladonia stygia often dominates groundcover and is a key winter food source for reindeer. The species shows a strong preference for treeless, ombrotrophic bogs, where it may outnumber species such as C. rangiferina. It is tolerant of wet conditions – able to survive prolonged periods of inundation during spring and autumn – and in such consistently moist habitats, growth can reach up to 2 cm per year.

In Austrian high moor/bog habitats, C. stygia typically occurs in relatively undisturbed areas dominated by Mountain Pine (Pinus mugo), where it grows alongside characteristic bog vegetation. Common vascular plant associates include the dwarf shrubs Calluna vulgaris (heather) and Andromeda polifolia (bog rosemary), the sedge Eriophorum vaginatum (tussock cottongrass), and Rhynchospora alba (white beak-sedge). Other lichens found in these communities include Cladonia pyxidata, C. coniocraea, and C. fimbriata, while typical bryophyte associates are Pleurozium schreberi, Aulacomnium palustre, Sphagnum rubellum, and Leucobryum glaucum. Although C. stygia is present in undisturbed bogs with this characteristic vegetation, studies have found it absent from peat-harvested bogs even when other typical bog species persist, suggesting it may serve as an indicator of relatively undisturbed bog habitats.

Research conducted in northwestern Alaska has shown that C. stygia grows at an average rate of 6.2–6.5 mm per year, with faster growth rates (7.0–7.8 mm/yr) observed in more continental eastern sites compared to oceanic western sites (5.2–5.5 mm/yr). Individual thalli can reach at least 30 years of age, although older portions may decay over time, and growth rates do not appear to be strongly correlated with climate variables such as temperature or precipitation. A comparative study in Quebec found C. stygia in 20–53% of logged plots, while it was largely absent from burned sites—suggesting that the species recovers more effectively from logging disturbances than from fire.

Studies in alpine environments have further revealed that C. stygia plays an important insulating role in soil temperature regulation. Its distinctive morphology—characterised by hollow, round podetia forming thick, bush-like mats with high water-holding capacity—provides stronger soil insulation compared to both bare ground and other lichen species. Although its darker colouration might imply a role in solar absorption, research indicates that water retention is the primary driver of its insulating properties, effectively reducing soil temperature fluctuations and mitigating freeze–thaw cycles.

=== Species interactions ===
Lichenicolous (lichen-dwelling) fungi that utilise C. stygia as a host include Anzina carneonivea, Bachmanniomyces uncialicola, Dactylospora sp., Heterocephalacria bachmannii, Niesslia keissleri, Protothelenella leucothelia, Protothelenella santessonii, Sphaerellothecium cladoniicola, Cryptodiscus cladoniicola, and Ramichloridium cladoniicola. Infection by the latter fungus causes a browning discolouration of the lichen thallus.

== Conservation ==
Despite its widespread occurrence in boreal regions, C. stygia is classified as strongly endangered (RL 2) in Germany—primarily as a consequence of habitat loss. In Lower Saxony, eutrophication and natural succession have allowed large mosses and grasses to outcompete terricolous lichens. Conservationists have successfully maintained C. stygia populations in managed dune and heathland habitats through topsoil removal (plaggen) and lichen transplantation.

The species is listed as endangered ("G" category) in Germany's Red List, with populations facing threats from competitive vegetation including brambles, raspberries, and various tree species that can outcompete the lichen. It is red-listed in Denmark.

== See also ==
- List of Cladonia species
