= Allopyrenis phaeococca =

Scientific classification
- Kingdom: Fungi
- Division: Ascomycota
- Class: Lichinomycetes
- Order: Lichinales
- Family: Phylliscaceae
- Genus: Allopyrenis
- Species: A. phaeococca

Binomial name
- Allopyrenis phaeococca (Tuck.) M.Schultz & M.Prieto (2024)

Synonyms
- Synalissa phaeococca Tuck. (1872); Pyrenopsis phaeococca (Tuck.) Tuck. (1882); Psorotichia phaeococca (Tuck.) Hasse (1913)

Species of lichen-forming fungus

Allopyrenis phaeococca is a species of lichen-forming fungus in the family Phylliscaceae. It forms a dark brown crust on granitic and other rock surfaces. The species occurs in North America, where it has been recorded from the eastern United States north to Alaska and Ontario, Canada.

== Taxonomy ==
The species was first scientifically described by Edward Tuckerman in 1872 as Synalissa phaeococca, based on material collected on granitic rocks in North Carolina and Massachusetts. In the protolog, he described the thallus as dark brown and eventually broken into areole-like masses, with the granules becoming somewhat coralloid (coral-shaped), and he distinguished the species from S. polycocca by its coarser tissue. Tuckerman also remarked that spores were difficult to find and interpret in North American material of Synalissa and Pyrenopsis. The spores he was able to observe in this species were described as simple, colourless, and ovoid to ellipsoid in shape. A decade later, Tuckerman transferred the species to the genus Pyrenopsis.

Matthias Schultz and María Prieto recombined the taxon into the new genus Allopyrenis in 2024, following a molecular phylogenetics-informed reorganization of the class Lichinomycetes.

== Habitat and distribution ==
In addition to North Carolina and Massachusetts reported in the protolog, other states in which Allopyrenis phaeococca has been documented include Delaware, New Jersey, and the upper Mississippi Valley in the American Midwest. The lichen's North American range extends north to Alaska. It was reported as new to Canada in 2015, after being recorded from Algonquin Provincial Park in Ontario.

Allopyrenis phaeococca has been documented as a member of the rock-dwelling riverine lichen community in the Piedmont region of North Carolina. Similarly, in a 1973 study of granite outcrop lichen communities in Georgia, the species was reported from exposed granitic rock and was listed among the five most abundant lithophilous cryptogams of that habitat. The material studied was collected from Arabia Mountain, a granitic dome southeast of Atlanta. Snyder and Wullstein also noted that the species has a blue-green algal photobiont assigned to Gloeocapsa. In acetylene-reduction experiments, samples of the lichen showed activity consistent with nitrogen fixation, although the authors suggested that associated bacteria such as Azotobacter, rather than the lichen itself, were probably responsible for much of the observed effect.
