= Lichinella granulosa =

Scientific classification
- Kingdom: Fungi
- Division: Ascomycota
- Class: Lichinomycetes
- Order: Lichinales
- Family: Lichinellaceae
- Genus: Lichinella
- Species: L. granulosa

Binomial name
- Lichinella granulosa M.Schultz (2005)
- Type locality: Yavapai County, Arizona

Species of lichen-forming fungus

Lichinella granulosa is a species of rock-dwelling lichen-forming fungus in the family Lichinellaceae. It is a small, blackish, crust-forming lichen that grows on various rock types in desert and woodland habitats of the southwestern United States and northwestern Mexico. Its algal partner is a cyanobacterium rather than a green alga, and the thallus surface bears distinctive granular outgrowths that may serve as vegetative dispersal units. The species was described in 2005 and is reported as very common in Arizona, though it is easily overlooked when not fertile.

== Taxonomy ==
Lichinella granulosa was described as new to science in 2005 by Matthias Schultz, based on material gathered during field and herbarium studies of cyanobacterial lichens from the southwestern United States and northwestern Mexico. The type collection was made in Arizona (Yavapai County, Beaver Creek valley, Bell Trail), where it was found on exposed red sandstone along a steep runoff track in pine-juniper woodland at about 1,200 m (3,900 ft) elevation. Additional type material (paratype) came from the Chiricahua Mountains of Cochise County, Arizona, where it grew on small limestone boulders in shaded pine-juniper-oak forest at about 1,750 m (5,740 ft). An isotype (duplicate) specimen is housed in the herbarium of the Natural History Museum, Vienna.

Schultz interpreted the species' distinctive granular outgrowths as soredia-like propagules that may function as an asexual dispersal unit alongside sexually produced ascospores, and he documented that the thallus can shift in appearance depending on the abundance of fruiting bodies (with fertile material tending to obscure the outlines of the areoles or squamules).

== Description ==
The thallus is blackish and dull to slightly glossy, forming spreading, irregularly areolate crusts or small, roundish to irregular squamules with minutely effigurate margins and a finely granular center. Individual areoles or squamules are about 0.4–1(–1.4) mm wide, and attach by tufts of rhizohyphae arising from the main thallus hyphae. Internally the thallus is homoiomerous, with robust fungal hyphae forming a dense network around large unicellular cyanobacterial cells that have thick, yellowish-brown gelatinous sheaths (the sheath reacting K+).

Fruiting bodies are thallinocarpous and small (about 0.15–0.4(–0.5) mm wide), initially semi-immersed to sessile and sometimes becoming stipitate. The disk is black and remains unchanged when moistened, with a thin but persistent (though indistinct) thalline margin and no proper exciple. The hymenium is hyaline and covered by small packets of thalline tissue, giving an IKI+ (blue) reaction that rapidly turns reddish-brown. Asci are thin-walled and typically 16–24(–32)-spored, and the ascospores are simple, hyaline, broadly ellipsoid, about 5–7 × 3–4 μm. Pycnidia are immersed, producing small ellipsoid conidia about 3–3.5 × 1 μm, and no lichen substances were detected. Spot tests are reported to be negative, and no secondary metabolites were detected.

== Habitat and distribution ==
Lichinella granulosa grows on a range of rock types, including limestone, caliche, rhyolite, sandstone, and granite, and has been recorded from roughly 500 to 1,750 m (1,640 to 5,740 ft) elevation. It occurs in desert to woodland settings, including lower Colorado and upland Sonoran Desert habitats, dry Chihuahuan Desert habitats, and pine-oak woodlands. In the Greater Sonoran Desert flora, the species is described as "very common" in Arizona but easy to overlook or misidentify, especially when sterile, when it can resemble a non-fruiting member of the Lichinaceae. When fertile, the thallus becomes more irregular in outline and the surface granules tend to proliferate. Thin sections can help confirm the thallinocarpous fruiting bodies and the characteristic thallus anatomy with large photobiont cells surrounded by short-celled hyphae.

The species tends to favor seepage tracks and bare rock surfaces on inclined boulders that are often north-facing, where periodic water flow appears to create suitable microsites for establishment and persistence. As treated by Schultz, the known distribution was based on more than 30 collections from central, southern, and southeastern Arizona, with additional records from southern California, southern New Mexico, northwestern Texas, and Sinaloa in Mexico. It has also been recorded from Utah, and the Mojave Desert. Sterile thalli that were tentatively attributed to Lichinella granulosa have been reported from calcareous rock in Parc del Garraf (Catalonia, Spain), but the authors treated the identification as provisional pending confirmation from fertile material; if verified, this would represent a first report for Europe.
