= Allopyrenis reducta =

Scientific classification
- Kingdom: Fungi
- Division: Ascomycota
- Class: Lichinomycetes
- Order: Lichinales
- Family: Phylliscaceae
- Genus: Allopyrenis
- Species: A. reducta

Binomial name
- Allopyrenis reducta (Th.Fr.) M.Schultz & M.Prieto (2024)

Synonyms
- Pyrenopsis reducta Th.Fr. (1866); Gloeopyrenia reducta (Th. Fr.) Zahlbr. (1937); Protothelenella reducta (Th. Fr.) Räsänen (1943)

Species of lichen-forming fungus

Allopyrenis reducta is a species of lichen-forming fungus in the family Phylliscaceae.

== Taxonomy ==
The species was first scientifically described in 1866 by Theodor Magnus Fries, who introduced it as Pyrenopsis reducta. In his protologue, Fries described it as having a thin, spreading, warted-areolate thallus with minute, loosely attached, very finely granular areoles that were dark brown to blackish when dry and reddish-sooty when wet. He recorded it from rocks on Fløifjellet near Tromsø, Norway, where he considered it scarce, and wrote that although it was most closely allied to P. granatina, it differed in its consistently smaller size, darker thallus, and black, opaque fruiting bodies. In outward appearance, he thought it more closely resembled P. grumulifera.

Matthias Schultz and María Prieto recombined the taxon into the new genus Allopyrenis in 2024, following a molecular phylogenetics-informed reorganization of the class Lichinomycetes.
