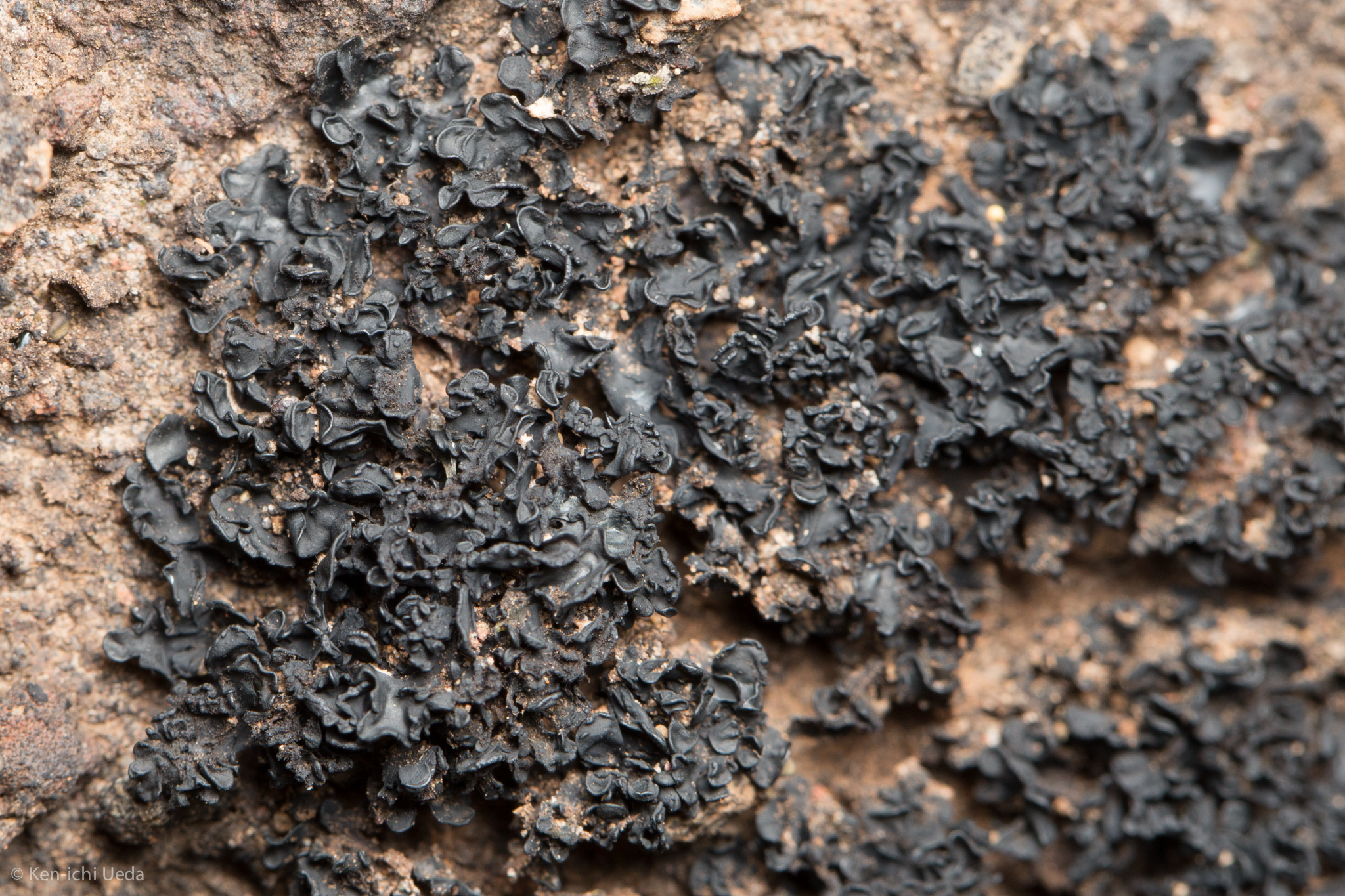
- Lichinella cribellifera

Scientific classification
- Kingdom: Fungi
- Division: Ascomycota
- Class: Lichinomycetes
- Order: Lichinales
- Family: Lichinellaceae
- Genus: Lichinella; Nyl. (1873)

Type species
- Lichinella stipatula Nyl. (1872)

Synonyms
- Gonohymenia J.Steiner (1902); Rechingeria Servít (1931)

= Lichinella =

Genus of lichen-forming fungi

Lichinella is a genus of lichen-forming fungi in the family Lichinellaceae. The genus is morphologically diverse, including species that form crusts, small scales, or tiny shrub-like tufts. Its members grow on rock surfaces and in biological soil crusts, mainly in warm-temperate to arid tropical regions worldwide. It was described by William Nylander in 1873, and was placed in the newly erected family Lichinellaceae following a 2024 molecular reclassification of the Lichinomycetes.

== Taxonomy ==
The genus was circumscribed in 1872 by the Finnish lichenologist William Nylander, who introduced Lichinella with L. stipatula as its type species. In the protologue, he described the new genus as being close to Leptogium but distinct in having a minute, densely tufted, fruticose thallus with a cellular interior containing comparatively large, bluish-green photobiont cells, together with terminal lecanorine apothecia, polysporous asci, and minute colourless conidia borne on slender, mostly simple sterigmata. Nylander also contrasted Lichinella with Leptogium microscopicum, which he regarded as more delicate and as having smaller cells and conidia.

In a 2024 multilocus molecular phylogenetics-informed reorganization and reclassification of the class Lichinomycetes, Lichinella was placed in the newly erected family Lichinellaceae together with Edwardiella, Gonotichia and Synalissina. The authors treat Lichinella as a medium-sized genus of almost 30 species, and diagnose the family by thallinocarpous ascomata (fruiting bodies developing within the thallus) and a Lichinella-type ascus (defined as thin walled with distinctly amyloid outer coat with a gelatinous cap). Several names formerly placed in segregate genera have been combined into Lichinella (e.g. transfers from Gonohymenia and Thallinocarpon), reflecting the new phylogeny.

== Description ==
Lichinella is a morphologically diverse genus that includes crustose, squamulose-peltate, foliose-fruticose, and dwarf-fruticose species. Its internal structure is similarly variable: crustose and small squamulose forms usually have a more uniform thallus, whereas lobate, foliose, and fruticose species often have a heteromerous thallus with a loose to compact central hyphal strand that may be distinctly fountain-like. Despite this variation in overall form, the genus is characterized by a relatively consistent type of fruiting body and ascus. The ascomata are thallinocarpous, with the hymenium covered by a continuous or discontinuous layer of sterile thallus tissue. The hymenium itself may be continuous, interrupted by sterile tissue, or reduced to a few asci and paraphyses scattered through the upper part of the thallus. The asci are irregular in shape and usually contain 16–32 small ascospores, and the hymenium shows a reddish-brown to wine-red iodine staining reaction before turning blue. No secondary metabolites have been detected in the genus by thin-layer chromatography.

== Habitat and distribution ==
Lichinella is a medium-sized genus of nearly 30 species with a worldwide distribution, although it is most diverse in warm-temperate to arid tropical regions. Species typically grow on rock surfaces that are only periodically wetted, and some also occur as components of biological soil crusts.

== Species ==
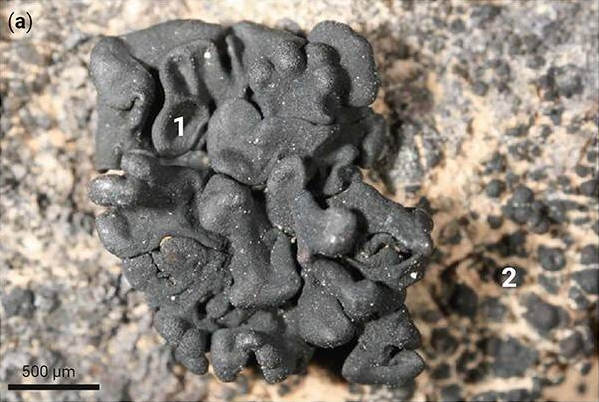
Lichinella iodopulchra; scale: 500 μm

- Lichinella algerica (J.Steiner) P.P.Moreno & Egea (1992)
- Lichinella americana Henssen (1969)
- Lichinella applanata Henssen (1963)
- Lichinella cribellifera (Nyl.) P.P.Moreno & Egea (1992)
- Lichinella flexa Henssen, Büdel & T.H.Nash (1986)
- Lichinella granulosa M.Schultz (2005)
- Lichinella heppii (Müll.Arg.) P.Clerc & Cl.Roux (2004)
- Lichinella hondoana (Zahlbr.) P.P.Moreno & Egea (1992)
- Lichinella inflata (Henssen) P.P.Moreno & Egea (1992)
- Lichinella intermedia Henssen, Büdel & T.H.Nash (1986)
- Lichinella iodopulchra (Couderc ex Croz.) P.Moreno & Egea (1992)
- Lichinella lojkana Hue (1898)
- Lichinella mauritanica (O.L.Lange) P.P.Moreno & Egea (1992)
- Lichinella melamphylla (Tuck.) Essl. (1995)
- Lichinella minnesotensis (Fink) Essl. (1995)
- Lichinella myriospora (Zahlbr.) P.P.Moreno & Egea ex M.Schultz (2005)
- Lichinella polyspora (H.Magn.) P.P.Moreno & Egea (1992)
- Lichinella robusta Henssen (1963)
- Lichinella robustoides Henssen, Büdel & T.H.Nash (1986)
- Lichinella sinaica (Galun & Marton) P.P.Moreno & Egea (1992)
- Lichinella stipatula Nyl. (1872)
- Lichinella undulata (Henssen) M.Schultz & van den Boom (2007)
