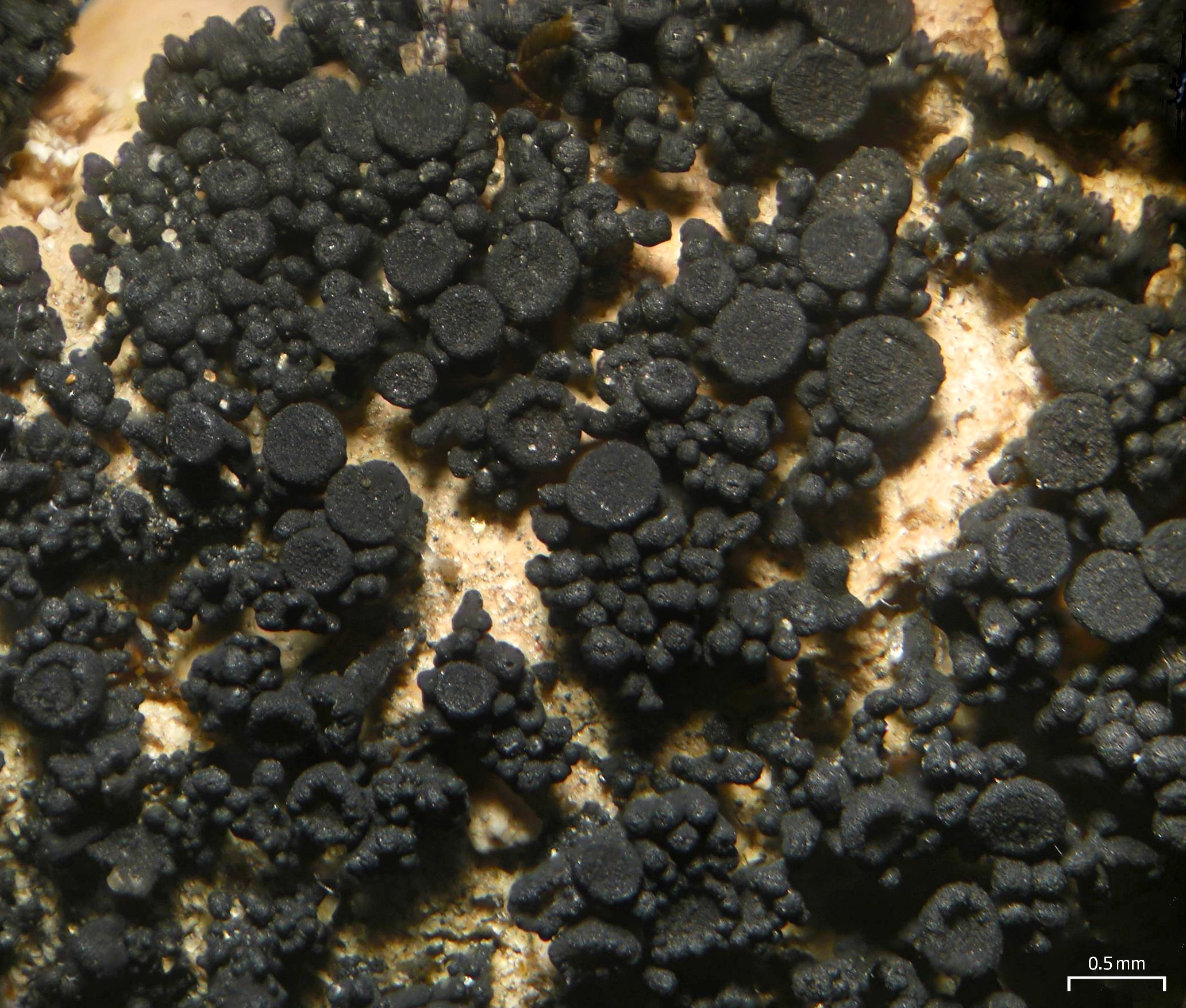
- Peccania tiruncula

Scientific classification
- Kingdom: Fungi
- Division: Ascomycota
- Class: Lichinomycetes
- Order: Lichinales
- Family: Phylliscaceae
- Genus: Peccania; A.Massal. ex Arnold (1858)

Type species
- Peccania coralloides (A.Massal.) A.Massal. (1858)

Synonyms
- Corinophoros A.Massal. (1856); Peccaniomyces Cif. & Tomas. (1953); Peccaniopsis M.Choisy (1949); Pleoconis Clem. (1909)

= Peccania =

Genus of fungi

Peccania is a genus of lichen-forming fungi in the family Phylliscaceae. These lichens are small and form thin, crusty patches or tiny scale-like structures that are tightly attached to rock surfaces. They partner with blue-green bacteria instead of the green algae found in most other lichens, which helps them survive in harsh, drought-prone environments and quickly resume photosynthesis after wetting. Peccania species grow exclusively on rocks, favouring well-lit locations on both limestone and acidic substrates in arid and semi-arid regions, though they can also occupy locally dry spots in otherwise humid landscapes. The genus includes about 22 species distributed worldwide, with their small fruiting bodies appearing as tiny disc-like structures that are often slightly sunken into the thallus surface.

== Taxonomy ==
Peccania was validly published by the Bavarian lichenologist Arnold in 1858, who credited Abramo Bartolommeo Massalongo with the name "in lit." dated 4 December 1856; Arnold's protologue listed P. coralloides and cited limestone localities around Streitberg in the Franconian Jura. The genus name Peccania is treated as a conserved name (nomen conservandum) under the International Code of Nomenclature (Art. 14), stabilising its use over Massalongo's earlier generic name Corinophoros. Later alternative or segregate names referring to the same group—Pleoconis (1909), Peccaniopsis (1949) and Peccaniomyces (1953)—are regarded as synonyms.

A class-wide multilocus study published in 2024 reassessed relationships across the Lichinomycetes and proposed a revised, family-level framework; within that scheme Peccania is treated in Phylliscaceae alongside other small, rock-dwelling cyanolichens such as Peltula and Phylliscum. The authors emphasised that earlier, morphology-only arrangements often conflict with DNA-based relationships, and that adoption of the revised classification is ongoing in regional floras and databases, so species assignments within Peccania may be updated as additional material is sequenced and re-examined. Ancestral-state analyses for the class suggest simple, crust-forming lichens with early-developing fruiting bodies and eight-spored asci, providing context for the small, saxicolous genera placed in Phylliscaceae.

== Description ==
The genus belongs to a group of cyanolichens that are very small in stature. The lichen body (thallus) is typically a tightly attached crust (crustose) or a patchwork of tiny, leaf-like scales (squamulose). The fruiting bodies are usually disc-like apothecia that can be slightly sunk into the thallus (immersed). Inside each apothecium, microscopic sac-like cells (asci) produce colourless spores (ascospores). The photosynthetic partner (photobiont) is a unicellular cyanobacterium, a trait linked with tolerance of strong light and periodic drying, since these lichens can quickly resume photosynthesis after wetting.

== Habitat and distribution ==
Consistent with patterns in Phylliscaceae, species of Peccania are chiefly saxicolous (rock-dwelling) and favour well-lit, drought-prone microhabitats on both acidic and calcareous substrates. They can be components of biological crusts on exposed rock and soil in arid and semi-arid regions, and they may also occupy locally dry niches in otherwise humid landscapes.

== Species ==
- Peccania arabica (Müll.Arg.) Henssen (1990)
- Peccania arizonica Tuck. ex Herre (1911)
- Peccania cerebriformis Henssen & Büdel (1984)
- Peccania cernohorskyi (Servít) Schiman-Czeika, Czeika & Guttová (2004)
- Peccania corallina Hazsl. (1884)
- Peccania coralloides (A.Massal.) Arnold (1858)
- Peccania crispa M.Steiner (1988)
- Peccania fontqueriana P.P.Moreno & Egea (1992)
- Peccania hoeegii D.D.Awasthi (1957)
- Peccania kansana (Tuck.) Forssell (1885)
- Peccania mattogrossensis Malme (1937)
- Peccania minuscula (Nyl.) Zahlbr. (1924)
- Peccania minutula Tretiach & M.Schultz (2007)
- Peccania omphalariformis Couderc (1910)
- Peccania pellizzonii A.Massal. (1860)
- Peccania polyspora H.Magn. (1940)
- Peccania subnigra (B.de Lesd.) Wetmore (1985)
- Peccania synaliza (Ach.) Forssell (1885)
- Peccania teretiuscula (Flagey) Henssen (1990)
- Peccania terricola H.Magn. (1940)
- Peccania texana (Tuck.) Wetmore (1985)
- Peccania tiruncula (Nyl.) Henssen (1990)
