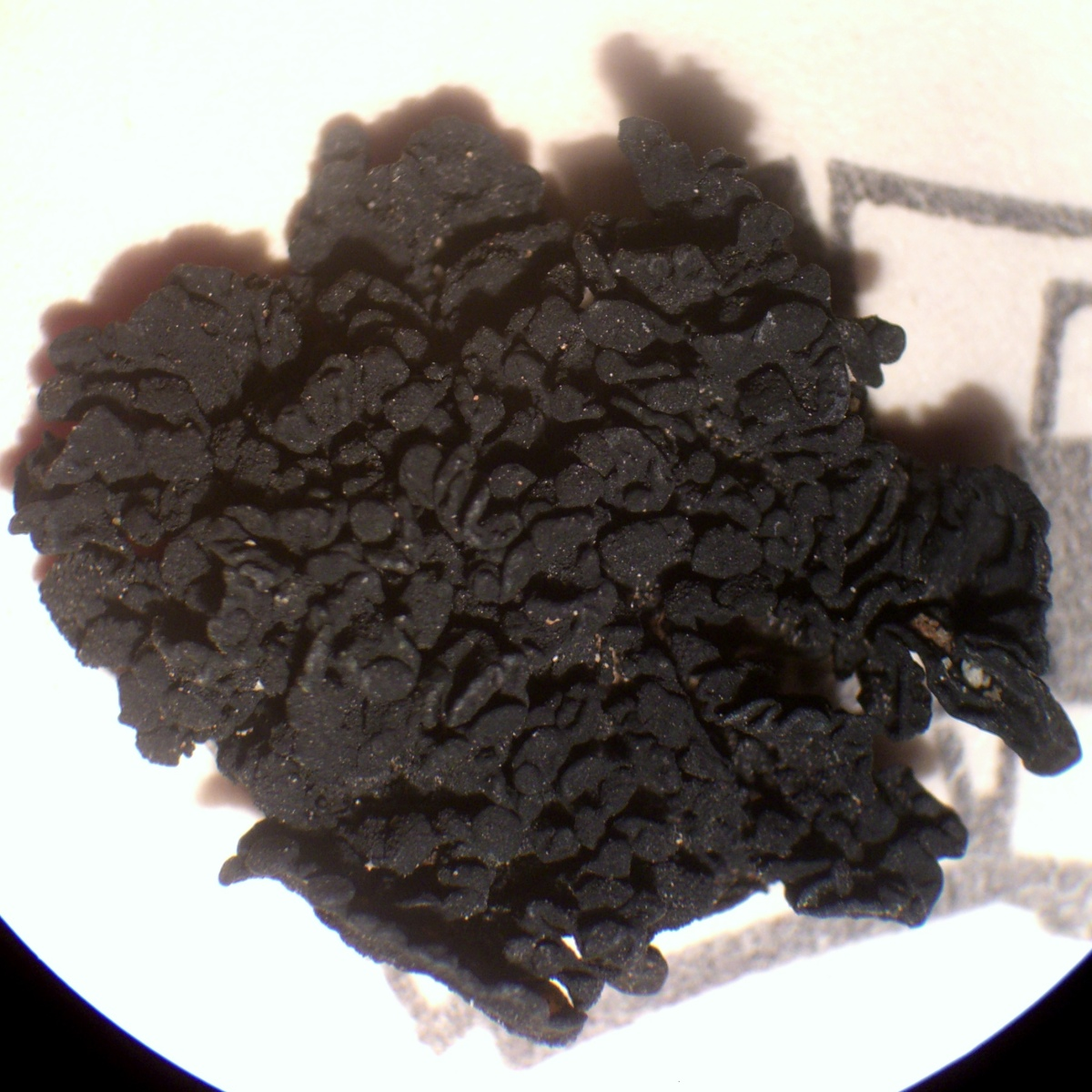
- Lichinella nigritella

Scientific classification
- Domain: Eukaryota
- Kingdom: Fungi
- Division: Ascomycota
- Class: Lichinomycetes
- Order: Lichinales
- Family: Lichinaceae
- Genus: Thallinocarpon; E.Dahl (1950)

Type species
- Thallinocarpon pulvinatum E.Dahl (1950)

Species
- T. nigritellum T. pulvinatum

= Thallinocarpon =

Genus of lichens

Thallinocarpon is a small genus of lichen-forming fungi in the family Lichinaceae. It has two species. The genus was circumscribed in 1950 by the Norwegian lichenologist Eilif Dahl, with Thallinocarpon pulvinatum assigned as the type, and at the time, only species. This species occurs in Greenland.

Per Magnus Jørgensen added another species, Thallinocarpon nigritellum, to the genus in 2007, transferred from Lichinella. This lichen is a significant species in the lichen communities of the Collematetea cristati class, particularly on the limestone cliffs of the Dniester Canyon in Ukraine. This lichen plays a role in the Thallinocarpo nigritelli-Anemum tumidulae association, where it achieves considerable coverage of up to 10%. Its presence is not limited to Ukraine, as it has also been observed in similar communities in the Czech Republic, indicating a broader geographical distribution. T. nigritellum grows in the dry, rocky areas just above the normal water level along riverbanks, often in association with other lichen species such as Anema tumidulum, A. nodulosum, and Staurothele frustulenta. The occurrence of T. nigritellum serves as a key differentiating factor for its namesake association, and is an indicator species for these specific limestone cliff habitats in Eastern Europe. The species is widely distributed, having also been recorded from the Russian Far East, Central and Mediterranean Europe, North Africa, and North America.
