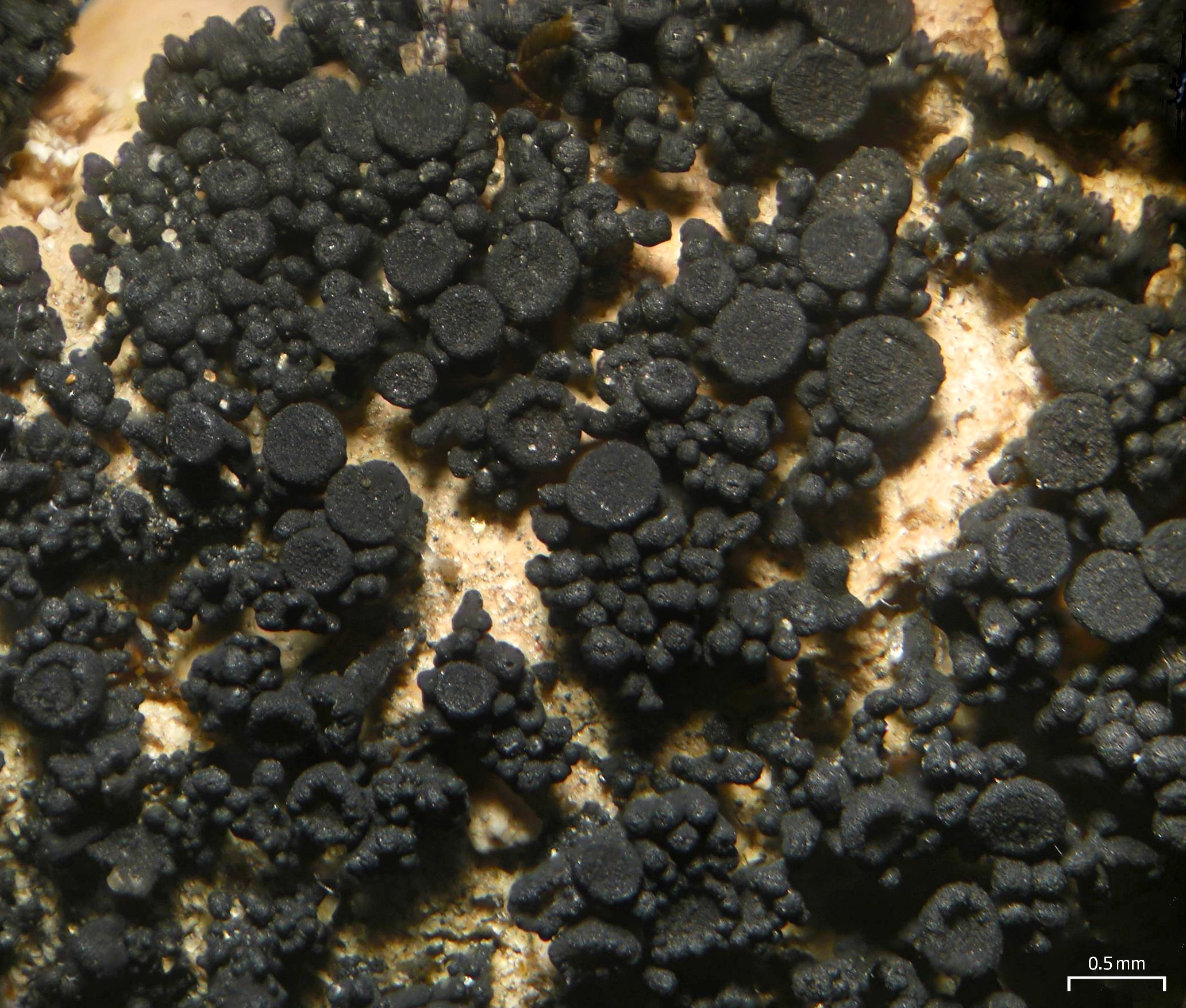

Scientific classification
- Kingdom: Fungi
- Division: Ascomycota
- Class: Lichinomycetes
- Order: Lichinales
- Family: Phylliscaceae
- Genus: Peccania
- Species: P. tiruncula

Binomial name
- Peccania tiruncula (Nyl.) Henssen (1990)

Synonyms
- Omphalaria tiruncula Nyl. (1878); Thyrea tiruncula (Nyl.) Zahlbr. (1924)

= Peccania tiruncula =

Species of lichen

Peccania tiruncula is a species of saxicolous (rock-dwelling), squamulose to dwarf fruticose lichen in the family Lichinaceae. It was first described as a new species in 1878 by the Finnish lichenologist William Nylander, who classified it in the genus Omphalaria. The type specimen was collected by Johan Petter Norrlin in Biskra. Aino Henssen transferred it to the genus Peccania in 1990.

In Africa, Peccania tiruncula has been recorded from Algeria, Morocco, Namibia, and the Sahara; in the Arabian Peninsula, it is found in Oman. In 2016, it was noted to occur in Turkey; collections from this country were noted to grow alongside other lichens Synalissa symphorea and Psorotichia schaereri. Peccania tiruncula is also found in Europe and North America. It often grows in calcareous rocky habitats.
