= Phyllisciella =

Scientific classification
- Kingdom: Fungi
- Division: Ascomycota
- Class: Lichinomycetes
- Order: Lichinales
- Family: Phylliscaceae
- Genus: Phyllisciella; Henssen (1984)
- Species: P. marionensis

Binomial name
- Phyllisciella marionensis Henssen (1984)

Genus of fungi

Phyllisciella is a fungal genus in the family Phylliscaceae. The genus is monotypic, containing only the species Phyllisciella marionensis. Both the genus and its single species were described as new to science by the German lichenologist Aino Henssen.

== Taxonomy ==
A class-wide multilocus study published in 2024 reassessed relationships across the Lichinomycetes and provided an updated family- and genus-level framework. In that scheme Phyllisciella is treated within Phylliscaceae; the authors note that the Phylliscum–Phyllisciella grouping is one of the places where generic boundaries remain weakly resolved, so further sampling is needed before limits are finalised. In their ancestral-state analyses they also coded a distinct "Phyllisciella-type" ascus as one of the ascus character states used to interpret evolution within the class.
