= Phylliscum =

Scientific classification
- Kingdom: Fungi
- Division: Ascomycota
- Class: Lichinomycetes
- Order: Lichinales
- Family: Phylliscaceae
- Genus: Phylliscum; Nyl.

Type species
- Phylliscum demangeonii (Moug. & Mont.) Nyl. (1855)

Synonyms
- Cryptotheliomyces Cif. & Tomas. (1953)

Genus of lichen-forming fungi

Phylliscum is a genus of lichen-forming fungi in the family Phylliscaceae. These lichens are small and often appear as tiny dark patches or scales tightly pressed against rock surfaces. They are easily overlooked due to their minute size, but can be found on exposed rocks in dry, sunny locations around the world.

== Taxonomy ==
Phylliscum was originally circumscribed by William Nylander in 1855. In his brief Latin diagnosis, Nylander characterised the genus by a thallus attached at a central umbilicus; the photobiont occurs as large, scattered, oblong-to-rounded granules, each enclosed in a tiny gelatinous sheath. The fruiting bodies were said to be "endocarpous" (immersed in the thallus), lacking paraphyses, and producing simple (non-septate), colourless spores; the hymenial gel gives a wine-red reaction in iodine. He also noted long, needle-shaped conidia (asexual propagules). Nylander included two species: P. endocarpoides and the type species, P. demangeonii.

Phylliscum is placed in the family Phylliscaceae in the 2024 class-wide revision of Lichinomycetes, which reassessed family and genus limits using multilocus DNA data together with diagnostic morphology. In that framework, Phylliscum is grouped with other small, rock-dwelling cyanolichens such as Peltula and Phyllisciella. The paper emphasises that adoption of the revised classification is ongoing in regional floras and databases, so species circumscriptions within the genus may be updated as additional material is sequenced and re-examined.

== Description ==
The lichen body (thallus) in Phylliscum is typically very small and dark brown to blackish, ranging from a tightly attached crust (crustose) to tiny scale-like patches (squamulose). The fruiting bodies are usually apothecia: minute disc-like structures that are often sunk into the thallus (immersed). Inside each apothecium, microscopic sac-like cells (asci) produce many small, colourless spores (ascospores). The photosynthetic partner (photobiont) is a unicellular cyanobacterium, a trait shared with several genera in the Phylliscaceae and relevant to their drought tolerance and ability to resume photosynthesis quickly after wetting.

== Habitat and distribution ==
Species of Phylliscum are chiefly saxicolous (rock-dwelling). They occur on well-lit, often drought-prone surfaces, frequently on calcareous or other mineral substrates. Within the broader family context, such lichens are common members of biological crusts on exposed rock and soil in dry regions, and they can also occupy locally dry microhabitats in otherwise humid climates.

== Species ==
- Phylliscum aotearoa (Henssen & B.Bartlett) M.Schultz & M.Prieto (2024)
- Phylliscum cylindrophorum (Vain.) M.Schultz (2024)
- Phylliscum demangeonii (Moug. & Mont.) Nyl. (1855)
- Phylliscum japonicum Zahlbr. (1927)
- Phylliscum laatokkaense (Vain.) M.Schultz & M.Prieto (2024)
- Phylliscum microphyllum Asahina (1931)
- Phylliscum neglectum (Henssen) M.Schultz & M.Prieto (2024)
- Phylliscum permiscens (Nyl.) M.Schultz & M.Prieto (2024)
- Phylliscum rhodostictum (Taylor) M.Schultz & M.Prieto (2024)
- Phylliscum vermiformis M.Schultz & Büdel (2000)
