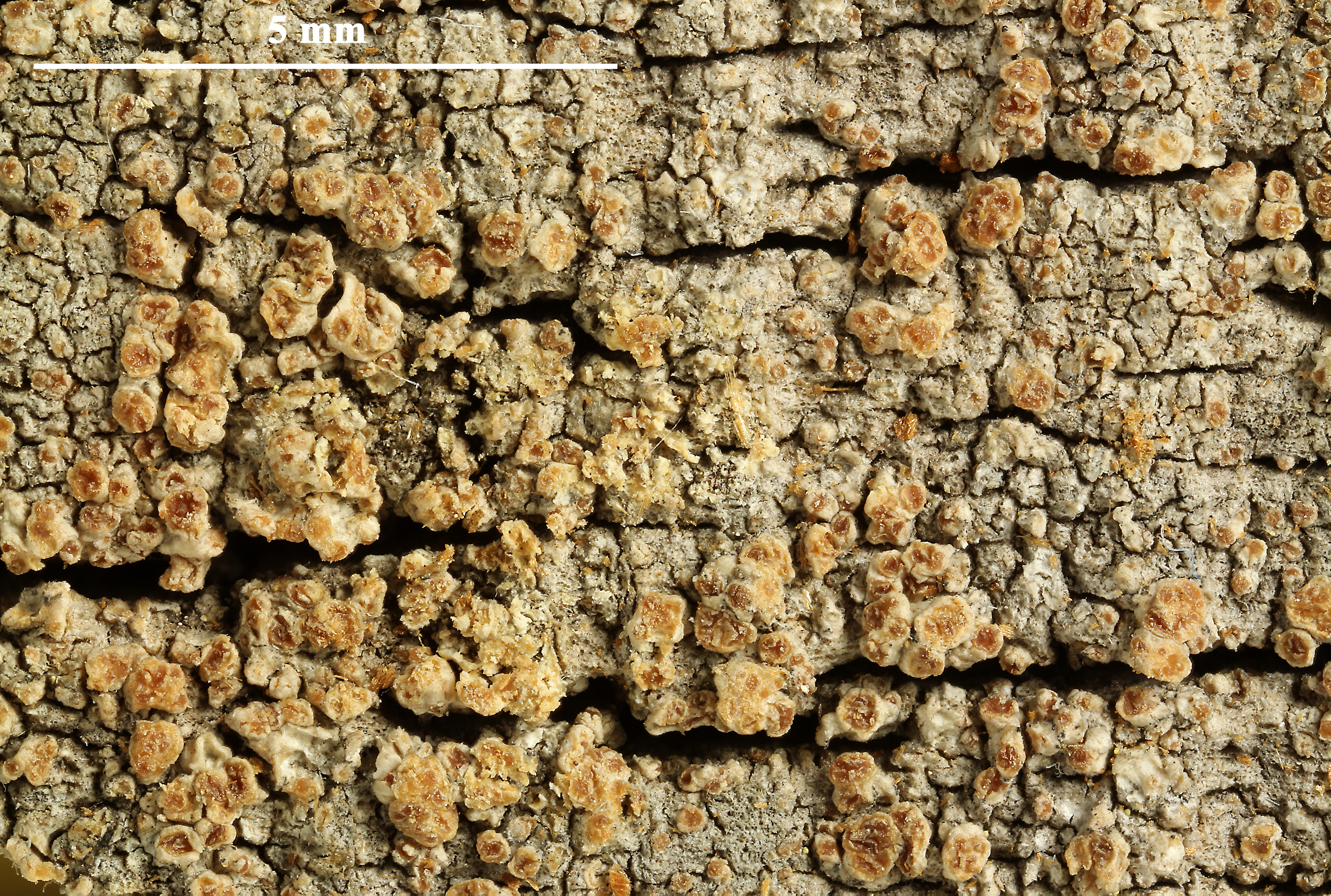
- Anzina carneonivea growing on a decaying spruce stump in Italy; scale bar=5 mm

Scientific classification
- Kingdom: Fungi
- Division: Ascomycota
- Class: Lecanoromycetes
- Subclass: Ostropomycetidae
- Genus: Anzina; Scheid. (1982)
- Species: A. carneonivea

Binomial name
- Anzina carneonivea (Anzi) Scheid. (1982)

Synonyms
- Gyalolechia carneonivea Anzi (1868); Secoliga carneonivea Arnold (1877); Pertusaria carneonivea (Anzi) Vain. (1888); Varicellaria carneonivea (Anzi) Erichsen (1936)

= Anzina =

Single-species fungal genus

Anzina is a fungal genus of uncertain familial and ordinal classification in the subclass Ostropomycetidae. It is monotypic genus, containing the single crustose lichen species Anzina carneonivea. The lichen occurs mainly in mountainous regions of Europe and western North America, where it grows on the bark of coniferous trees and on decaying organic matter. The genus name honours the Italian botanist Martino Anzi, who first described the species in 1868. The genus was established more than a century later, after microscopic work indicated that the species had a distinctive set of characters.

== Taxonomy ==
The species was first described in 1868 by the Italian botanist Martino Anzi as Gyalolechia carneonivea. In later decades, it was transferred to several different genera. In 1877 it was transferred to Secoliga by Gustav Arnold. In 1881 it was moved again, to Lecidea by William Nylander.

In 1906, the German lichenologist Alexander Zahlbruckner described Pertusaria tauriscorum. This name was later treated as a synonym of Anzi's species. Zahlbruckner was unaware that his new name referred to the same species described earlier by Anzi. The connection between the two names was recognized later, and substantial morphological similarities were noted in subsequent work. The species was subsequently placed in Varicellaria by Christian Erichsen in 1936 as V. carneonivea. This placement proved problematic because the thallus (lichen body) is organized differently, suggesting that the species required its own genus.

The genus Anzina was circumscribed (formally delimited) in 1982, honouring the original discoverer Martino Anzi. Anzina shares many characters with Trapelia, especially in ascus structure and function. It differs in lacking wall thickening at the ascus tip and in having a distinctive amyloid (iodine-staining) ring in the inner wall layer. Together, these morphological differences and spore characters supported treating Anzina as a separate, monotypic genus.

A second variety, A. carneonivea var. tetraspora, was also described, distinguished mainly by asci that consistently contain four spores and occurring specifically on Rhododendron ferrugineum in alpine environments.

== Description ==
The genus Anzina, represented by the single species Anzina carneonivea, is a crustose lichen that forms grey-white patches on bark, decaying wood, plant litter and dead mosses. Most of the thallus develops within the substrate rather than on its surface (largely endoxylic), and it can coalesce into patches up to several square decimetres. Where it overgrows dead moss cushions, the lichen becomes partly concealed by the persistent moss leaves. Under the microscope, well-developed thalli form discrete "nests" about 40 micrometres (μm) across. The photobiont (algal partner) is the green algal species Asterochloris phycobiontica (order Chlorococcales). It has been isolated and cultured from several Swiss alpine sites; wood-dwelling and moss-dwelling populations use the same photobiont.

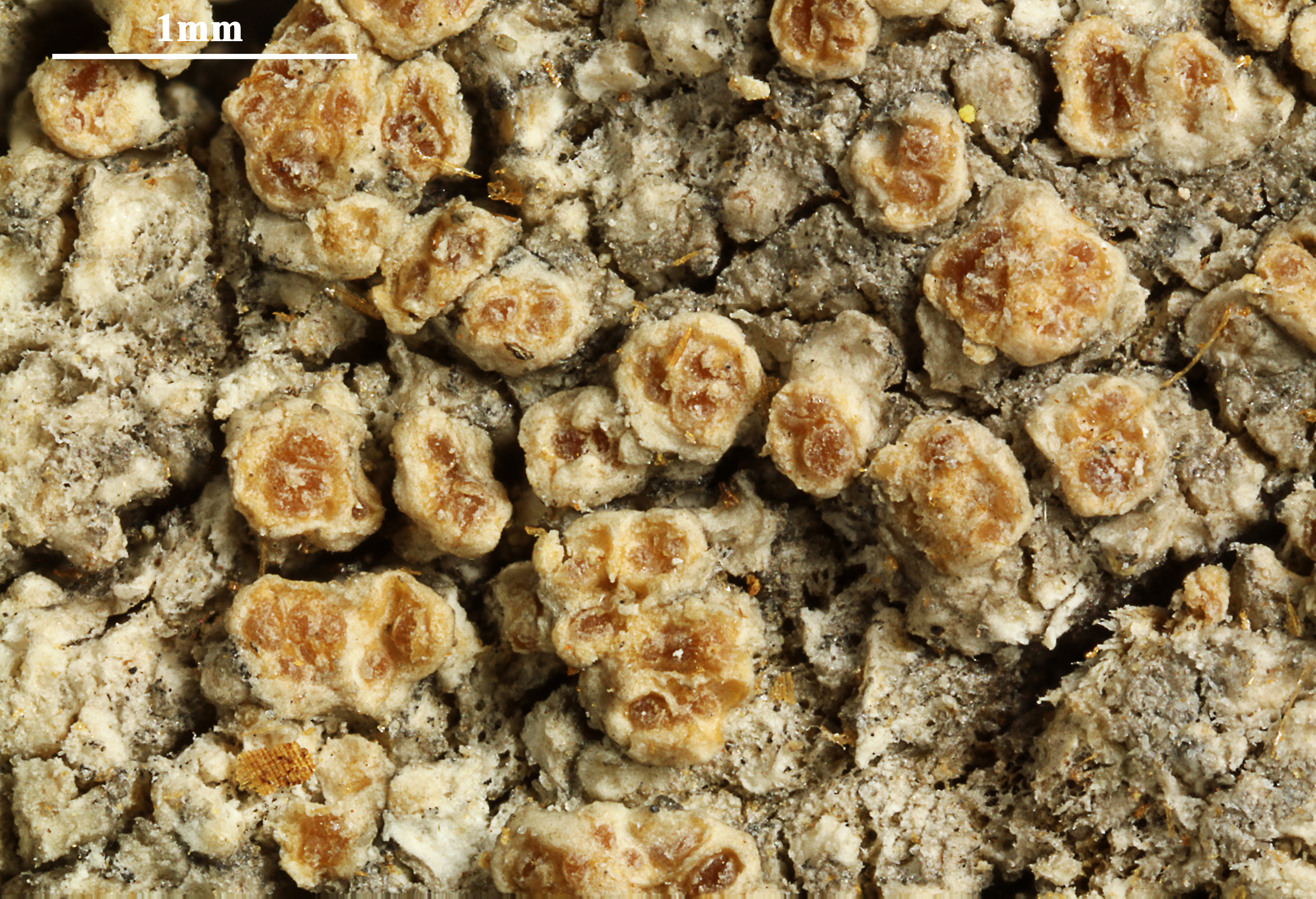
Closeup of the fruiting bodies; scale bar = 1 mm

Asexual propagules are produced in pycnidia (minute flask-like structures) 90–160 μm across. Young pycnidia have a pin-point (punctiform) ostiole (opening), which often becomes markedly enlarged with age; they sit on, or slightly above, the substrate surface. Conidiophores develop from intercalary conidiogenous cells, producing rod-shaped conidia (asexual spores) (about 3.5–4.5 × 0.7 μm) on both wood and moss substrates. Sexual reproduction occur in apothecia, which are abundant (typically 120–300 μm in diameter) and occur singly or in clusters. The discs are pale orange to orange with a mostly smooth hymenial surface, and "multi-disc" apothecia may form when several separate primordia (developing fruiting bodies) form within the same nest. The excipulum, the rim tissue fringing the disc, is poorly developed and consists of a thin layer of closely adjacent cells. Asci are somewhat cylindrical. Their tip (apex) is not thickened and reacts only weakly amyloid (iodine-staining). The inner ascus wall bears an apical amyloid ring capped by amyloid material, and the ascus opens by a short apical slit; functionally it is unitunicate (it operates as a single-walled sac). The ascus wall is about 300 nanometres thick and of intermediate electron density.

Ascospores are usually two-celled (rarely three- or four-celled), ellipsoid to narrowly ellipsoid, thin-walled and colourless at maturity; under light microscopy they are surrounded by an irregular halo up to about 1 μm thick. Spore size varies with substrate. On Rhododendron, spores are usually 13–17 μm long and 4–6 μm wide, with occasional extremes from about 13 μm up to 21 μm in length and up to 7 μm in width. On plant remains they are generally 11–16 μm long and 4–7 μm wide, with rare extremes down to about 11 μm and up to 18.5 μm long. On dead wood they are typically 11–16 μm long and 5–6 μm wide, with occasional maxima around 15.5 μm in length and 7.4 μm in width. In standard spot tests the thallus gives a distinct C+ (red) reaction and a weak K+ (yellow) reaction, consistent with the presence of gyrophoric acid together with traces of lecanoric acid and an additional, unidentified substance.

== Habitat and distribution ==
Anzina carneonivea was initially thought to be restricted to Europe, appearing widespread in subalpine parts of the Alps and in the boreal forests of Scandinavia. More recent finds extend its range to North America. The species grows on bark, rotting wood, plant remains and, especially, dead mosses. Its apparent rarity in older collections may reflect its cryptic growth, with much of the thallus developing within the substrate (endoxylic) and often occurring beneath moss cover, rather than true scarcity.

In Europe, it is most frequent in alpine and montane settings, with populations recorded from Switzerland, Austria, northern Italy, Finland, Norway and Sweden. In the Alps it occurs at roughly 1,400–2,280 m above sea level, especially near the subalpine forest boundary. It grows on both conifer bark, particularly Picea abies (Norway spruce), Pinus mugo (mountain pine) and Pinus cembra (Swiss stone pine), and on decaying organic matter in these montane ecosystems. In Scandinavian boreal forests it occupies similar substrates and is frequently associated with moss-rich microhabitats, often growing over dead Polytrichum species and other bryophytes.

The first North American record is from high-elevation conifer forest in southern British Columbia, where the species was collected in the Cheakamus River basin above the upper terminal of Whistler Mountain, at about 1,900 m elevation. This record extends the known range and suggests that A. carneonivea may be more widely circumboreal than previously recognized. Anzina carneonivea var. tetraspora remains more restricted, documented on Rhododendron ferrugineum in Austrian alpine sites between 1,820 and 2,150 m, though further survey work may reveal additional populations.
