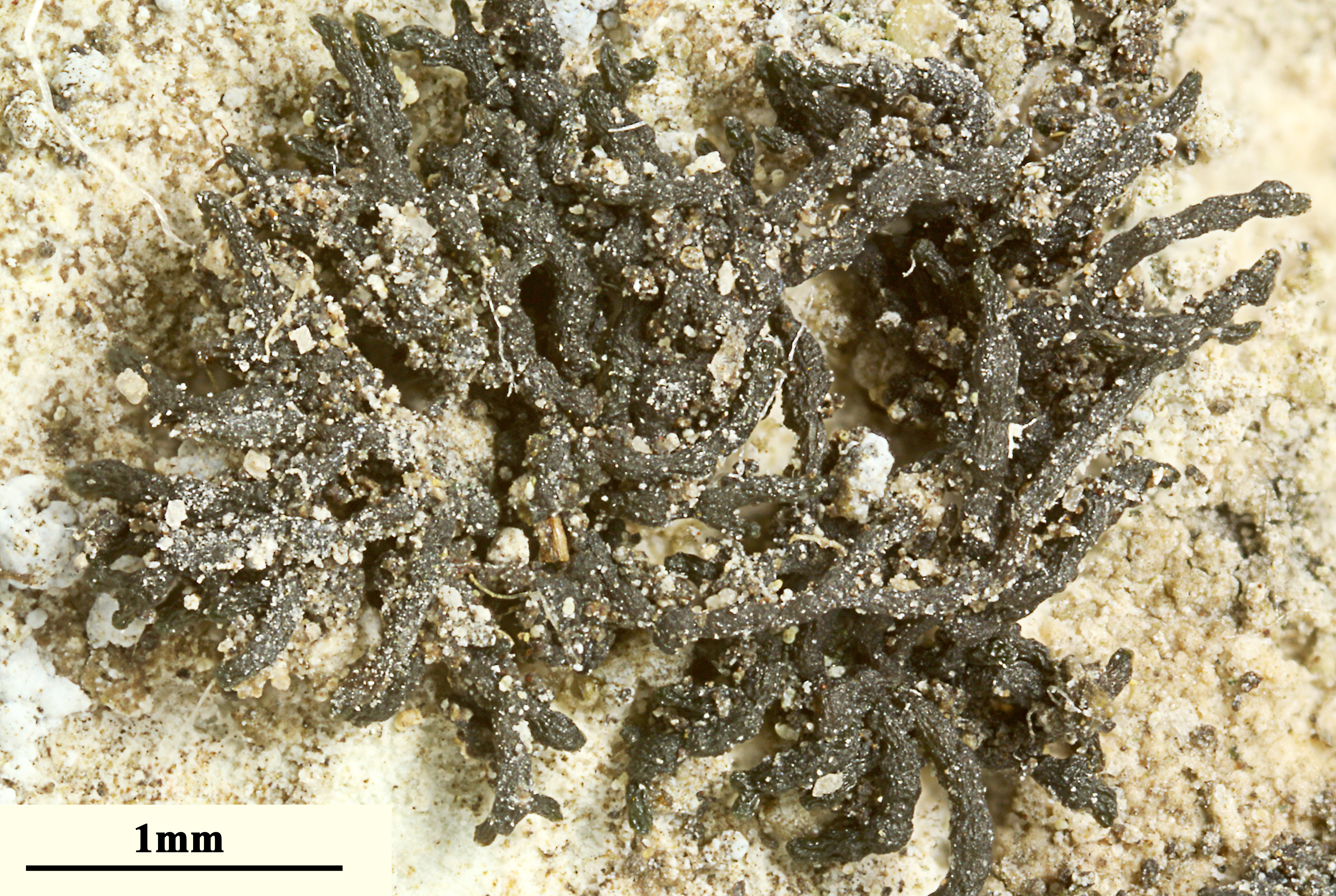
- Synalissina intricata

Scientific classification
- Kingdom: Fungi
- Division: Ascomycota
- Class: Lichinomycetes
- Order: Lichinales
- Family: Lichinellaceae
- Genus: Synalissina; Nyl. (1886)

Type species
- Synalissina intricata (Arnold) Nyl. (1886)

Species
- See text

= Synalissina =

Genus of lichen-forming fungi

Synalissina is a genus of saxicolous (rock-dwelling) cyanolichens (lichens with cyanobacteria as the photosynthetic partner) placed in the family Lichinellaceae. These tiny lichens form blackish, variable growths, ranging from small leaf-like patches to dwarf cushions, on calcareous and mineral-rich rocks in exposed to partially shaded locations. The genus was originally described by William Nylander in 1886 but fell into disuse until it was resurrected in 2024 following DNA studies that reorganised cyanolichen classification. It comprises nine species distributed across boreal to warm-temperate regions of the Northern Hemisphere.

== Taxonomy ==
Synalissina was originally erected by the Finnish lichenologist William Nylander in 1886. Nylander placed the genus under his tribe "Collemei" and explained the name as referring to the "hormogonia-bearing gonidia" (i.e. the cyanobacterial photobiont); he included Synalissina intricata, transferring Arnold's Omphalaria intricata (which he had earlier treated under Synalissa), and cited records from Tyrol and Scotland.

The name Synalissina was resurrected by María Prieto, Mats Wedin and Matthias Schultz in their 2024 study to accommodate a clade within the family Lichinellaceae that had previously been included in Lempholemma (the "Lempholemma botryosum group"). In their formal diagnosis they characterise Synalissina as a genus of Lichinellaceae with a Nostoc cyanobiont, zeorine apothecia (disc with a thick thalline margin) that originate from ascogones arising in a spheroid tangle of generative hyphae (i.e. thallus-internal initiation), and Peccania-type asci. They verified multiple new combinations in the genus and note the exclusive occurrence on rock.

== Description ==
Thalli of Synalissina are blackish (sometimes with a greyish "frosted" bloom, i.e. pruinose), very small and variable in form: from small foliose through small squamulose-peltate to dwarf-fruticose cushions. They are ecorticate (lacking an outer cortex) and homoiomerous (with photobiont cells distributed throughout the thallus), with hyphae forming a loose network around chains of Nostoc; the thallus swells markedly when wet and attaches by rhizohyphae or a small umbilicus. Some species develop terminal hormocystangia; isidiose or phyllidiose outgrowths are rare. Fruiting bodies (apothecia) are small, sessile or short-stalked at branch tips, zeorine (thick thalline margin with a thin proper exciple); the hymenium is iodine-positive (KOH/Lugol+ blue). Asci are Peccania-type and eight-spored; ascospores are simple (non-septate). Pycnidia are immersed in the thallus to slightly elevated and produce small, bacilliform to ellipsoid conidia. No secondary metabolites were detected by thin-layer chromatography.

== Habitat and distribution ==
Species of Synalissina are early colonisers of calcareous or mineral-rich rocks, on exposed through steep and somewhat shaded faces, including temporarily moist situations. The genus is reported as widely distributed across boreal to warm-temperate regions of the Northern Hemisphere.

== Species ==
- Synalissina botryosa (A.Massal.) M.Schultz & M.Prieto (2024)
- Synalissina cladodes (Tuck.) M.Schultz & M.Prieto (2024)
- Synalissina condensata (Arnold) M.Schultz & M.Prieto (2024)
- Synalissina degeliana (P.M.Jørg.) M.Schultz & M.Prieto (2024)
- Synalissina dispansa (H.Magn.) M.Schultz & M.Prieto (2024)
- Synalissina intricata (Arnold) Nyl. (1886)
- Synalissina intricatissima (J.Steiner) M.Schultz & M.Prieto (2024)
- Synalissina isidiodes (Nyl. ex Arnold) M.Schultz & M.Prieto (2024)
- Synalissina vesiculifera (Henssen) M.Schultz & M.Prieto (2024)
