= Gonotichia =

Scientific classification
- Kingdom: Fungi
- Division: Ascomycota
- Class: Lichinomycetes
- Order: Lichinales
- Family: Lichinellaceae
- Genus: Gonotichia; M.Schultz & M.Prieto (2024)

Type species
- Gonotichia octosporella (Lettau) M.Schultz & M.Prieto (2024)

Species
- G. depauperata G. octosporella

Genus of lichens

Gonotichia is a small genus of cyanolichens (lichens that partner with cyanobacteria) in the family Lichinellaceae. The genus was established in 2024 as part of a major reorganisation of cyanolichen classification based on DNA studies, and contains just two species that form tiny, dark crusts on sun-exposed rocks. These lichens are characterised by their distinctive reproductive structures that develop as swellings within the lichen body rather than as separate disc-like structures on the surface.

== Taxonomy ==
The genus was circumscribed by Matthias Schultz and María Prieto as part of a class-wide phylogenetic revision that reorganised Lichinomycetes into four families (three emended and one new). Within this scheme, Gonotichia forms a distinct clade in Lichinellaceae, which the authors diagnose chiefly by thallinocarpous ascomata and a Lichinella-type ascus. The type species is Gonotichia octosporella, a taxon that was originally described as Gonohymenia octosporella by Georg Lettau in 1942. A second species, G. depauperata (originally described as Gonohymenia myriospora var. depauperata by Miroslav Servít in 1937), was also included in the original treatment.

== Description ==
Species of Gonotichia are minute, rock-dwelling cyanolichens. The thallus (lichen body) is crustose, forming thin, dark, irregular patches (areoles) on the substrate rather than a leafy or shrubby form. The sexual reproductive structures are thallinocarpous, i.e. the ascomata develop within swellings of the thallus instead of as open, disc-like apothecia on the surface. Asci conform to the Lichinella-type used to characterise Lichinellaceae; in the type species they bear eight ascospores.

== Habitat and distribution ==
Gonotichia species occur on sun-exposed mineral substrates, especially siliceous rock, in open sites. Their very small, dark crusts are typical of many Lichinellaceae, which are scattered but widespread in suitable dry, well-lit habitats.

== Species ==
The following species are accepted in the 2024 treatment:

- Gonotichia depauperata (Servít) M.Schultz & M.Prieto (2024)
- Gonotichia octosporella (Lettau) M.Schultz & M.Prieto (2024)
