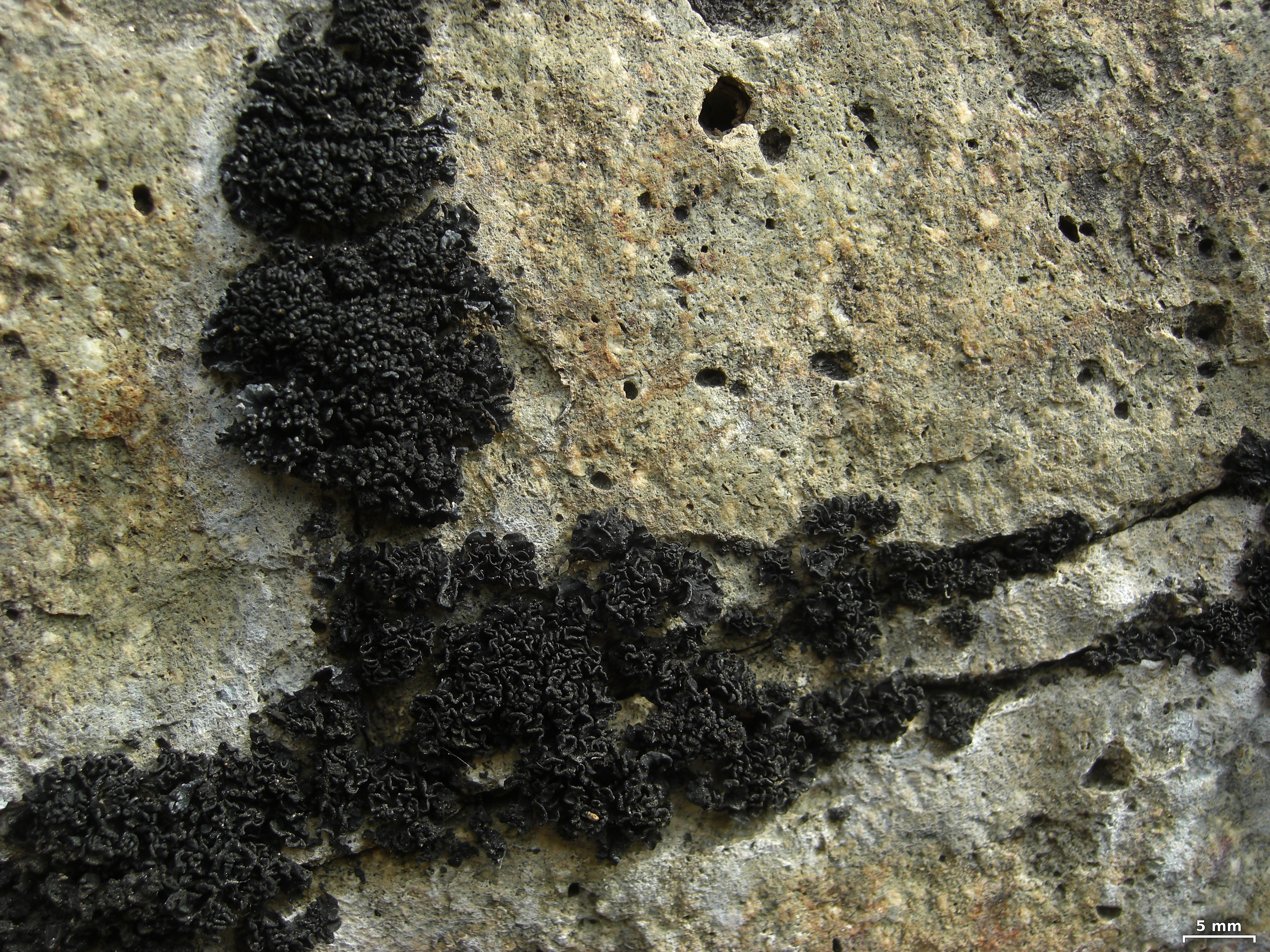
- Lichinella nigritella

Scientific classification
- Kingdom: Fungi
- Division: Ascomycota
- Class: Lichinomycetes
- Order: Lichinales
- Family: Lichinellaceae; M.Prieto & M.Schultz (2024)

Type genus
- Lichinella Nyl. (1873)

Genera
- Edwardiella; Gonotichia; Lichinella; Synalissina

= Lichinellaceae =

Family of lichens

The Lichinellaceae are a family of minute lichen-forming fungi in the order Lichinales. These tiny cyanolichens typically form small, dark, cushion-like growths or inconspicuous crusts on rocks in sunny, dry locations. The family was established in 2024 following DNA studies that revealed the need to reorganise the classification of cyanolichens, as many traditional groupings did not reflect evolutionary relationships. Members are characterised by their distinctive reproductive structures called thallinocarps, which develop as swellings within the lichen body rather than as separate disc-like structures on the surface.

== Taxonomy ==
A multilocus molecular phylogenetics study published in 2024 showed that several long-used family and genus circumscriptions in Lichinomycetes were non-monophyletic. On that basis the authors re-delimited the class into four families (three emended and one new), using DNA evidence alongside informative morphological characters—especially ascoma development (thallinocarpy vs. open apothecia) and ascus type. Within this scheme they erected Lichinellaceae in the order Lichinales, corresponding to their clade 5 and defined by thallinocarpous ascomata and a Lichinella-type ascus. In the study's time-calibrated phylogeny, Lichinellaceae is inferred to be a comparatively young crown lineage within Lichinales, with divergence times overlapping those estimated for Lichinaceae and appreciably shallower than the deeper-branching families recognised in the order. The family currently includes the genera Edwardiella, Gonotichia (new), Lichinella (incl. Gonohymenia, Rechingeria and Thallinocarpon in synonymy), and Synalissina (resurrected). The study also introduced 11 new genera, resurrected five, and made 54 new combinations across the class.

== Description ==
Members of Lichinellaceae are minute cyanolichens. Thalli (the lichen body) are typically very small, often appearing as tiny, dark, tufted or coralloid cushions (dwarf‑fruticose) or inconspicuous crusts. A representative habit is shown by Lichinella stipatula, pictured as "fruticulose or dwarf‑fruticose with short, erect branchlets".

The family is characterised by thallinocarps, which are ascomata (spore‑producing structures) that develop from swellings of the thallus itself rather than as a distinct, open disc from the surface (apothecium). In Lichinella, early thallinocarp development can be seen as coiled reproductive hyphae forming just beneath the thallus surface; mature thallinocarps often look like dotted or roughened patches because the hymenium (spore layer) remains covered, wholly or in part, by a thin thalline veil. Asci are of the "Lichinella type": thin‑walled, irregularly clavate sacs that lack a thickened apical apparatus but show a gelatinous outer coat that stains in iodine reagents.

Like most Lichinomycetes, species in this family partner with cyanobacteria (the cyanobiont), which contributes to the dark, sometimes gelatinous look when wet and to the ability to fix atmospheric nitrogen. The family diagnosis in the 2024 paper is grounded in this suite of characters: tiny thalli, thallinocarpous ascomata, and Lichinella‑type asci.

== Habitat and distribution ==
Species placed in Lichinellaceae are chiefly saxicolous (rock‑dwelling) in open, often dry sites, forming minute blackish cushions or patches on sun‑exposed rocks; some can occur on consolidated soils or similar mineral substrates. Documented records for representative taxa span multiple continents (e.g., Europe, North America, Africa and Asia), indicating a broad, if scattered, distribution for the family's genera.

== Genera ==
- Edwardiella Henssen (1986) – 1 sp.
- Gonotichia M.Schultz & M.Prieto (2024) – 2 spp.
- Lichinella Nyl. (1873) – about 30 spp.
- Synalissina Nyl. (1885) – 9 spp.
