= Martino Anzi =

Italian priest and naturalist

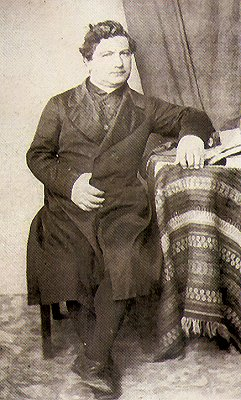
- Born: January 31, 1812
- Died: April 19, 1883 (aged 71)
- Scientific career
- Author abbrev. (botany): Anzi

Martino Anzi (31 January 1812 – 19 April 1883) was an Italian priest, ethnologist, historian and botanist. He is particularly noted for his floristic studies of Italian lichens.

== Career ==
Martino Anzi was born in Bormio to Cristoforo and Domenica De Gasperi. In 1835 began his theological studies in Bergamo and was ordained as a priest. He spent most of his life in Como, Italy, first as the bishop's chancellor and then as professor of theology, ecclesiastical history, religious apologetics and natural history at the seminary of Como. some of his sermons and lecture notes still exist. He knew several languages, including Latin, Hebrew, French, English and German. He wrote an ecclesiastical history from the founding of the Church to the Council of Trent. During the Italian revolts of 1848 he was part of the local security committee, and organized the defense of the Stelvio Pass at the border between Switzerland and modern Italy during the first war of independence.

Anzi's most significant activity was as a naturalist, especially lichens, mosses, liverworts, freshwater algae, and fungi. He worked in the Valtellina and Como areas. He became aware of the botanical richness of Valtellina and wrote a guide to it that was published in 1885. His study of lichens increased the number of species known in the region from 37 in 1834 to around 541 in 1860. Anzi edited eight exsiccatae, among others the series Lichenes rariores Langobardi exsiccati (1861-1873). He also wrote about vascular plants in 1878–1881, providing new information on identifications and species distributions that added to knowledge of the Italian flora. In addition, he recorded many herbal and folk remedies, with specific detail on plants, although he did not provide any medical treatments himself.

== Honours ==
In 1861 Anzi was made a Knight of the Order of Saints Maurice and Lazarus in recognition of his botanical work. He was a member of the precursor of the modern Pontifical Academy of Sciences. The fungal genera Anzia, Anziella, and Anzina were named in his honour.

== Legacy ==
During his studies, Anzi was the first to describe many hundreds of species of lichen, many of which are still considered valid. The main location of the specimens that he collected and preserved is the herbarium of the Botanical Institute of the University of Turin, but many thousands of his specimens are in other European herbaria. Anzi included specimens collected by Abramo Bartolommeo Massalongo in his collection.

== Publications ==
- Martino Anzi, Catalogus lichenum quos in provincia Sondriensi et circa Novum Comum collegit et in ordinem systematicum digessit presbyter Martinus Anzi. Novi-Comi: ex officina Caroli Franchi bibliopolae, 126 pp. 1860
- Martino Anzi, Manipulus lichenum rariorum vel novorum quos in Longobardia et Etruria collegit et enumeravit. Commentario della Società Crittogamologica Italiana 1 (3): 130–166, 1862
- Martino Anzi, Symbola lichenum rariorum vel novorum Italiae superioris. Génova: Tipografia dei sordomuti, 28 pp. 1864 (on-line)
- Martino Anzi, Neosymbola lichenum rariorum vel novorum Italiae superioris. Milano: Tip. Bernardoni, 18 pp. 1866
- Martino Anzi, Analecta lichenum rariorum vel novorum Italiae superioris. Milano: Tip. Bernardoni, 1868
- Martino Anzi, Enumeratio hepaticarum quas in provinciis novo-comensi et sondriensi collegit prof. Martinus Anzi. Milano: U. Hoepli, 1881
- Martino Anzi, Auctarium ad Floram novo-comensem editam a Josepho Comolli. 29 pp. 1878 and 1881
- Martino Anzi, Enumeratio moscorum longobardiae superioris, auctore presbyt. Martino Anzi. Milano: U. Hoepli, 1901
- Martino Anzi, Catalogus lichenum quos in provincia sondriensi et circa Novum-Comum collegit et in ordinem systematicum digessit Martinus Anzi. San Giovanni in Persiceto: FARAP, 1994

== See also ==
- Category:Taxa named by Martino Anzi
