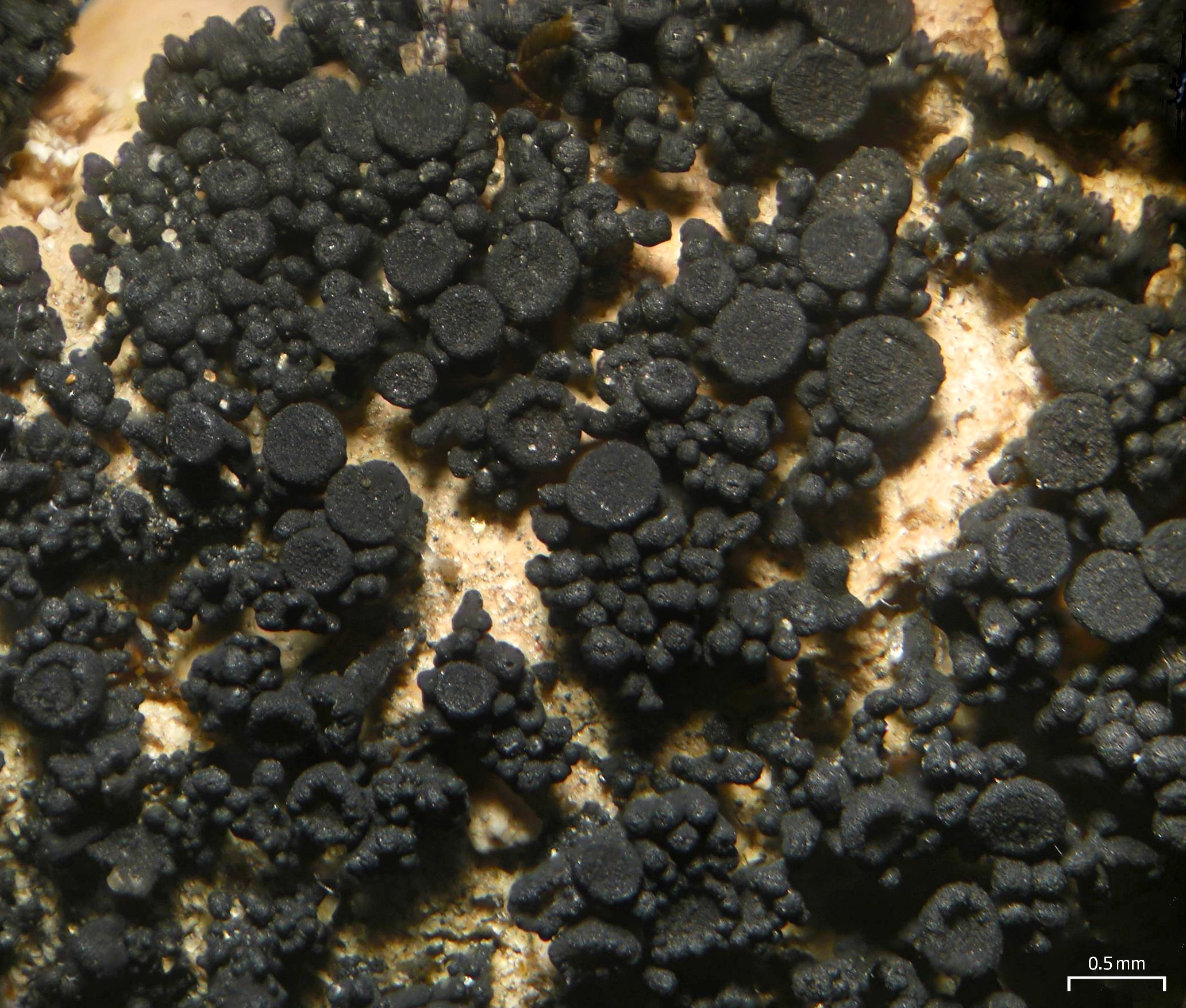
- Peccania tiruncula

Scientific classification
- Kingdom: Fungi
- Division: Ascomycota
- Class: Lichinomycetes
- Order: Lichinales
- Family: Phylliscaceae; Fr. (1861)

Type genus
- Phylliscum Nyl. (1855)

Genera
- Allopyrenis; Peccania; Peltula; Phylliscidium; Phylliscum; Phyllisciella

= Phylliscaceae =

Family of cyanolichen-forming fungi

The Phylliscaceae are a family of lichen-forming ascomycete fungi placed in the order Lichinales (class Lichinomycetes). Members are mostly small cyanolichens that form thin crusts tightly attached to rock, or minute, scale-like rosettes. These lichens are typically found growing on rocks in sunny, dry locations where they form small, crusty patches or tiny leaf-like scales. They partner with cyanobacteria instead of green algae, which helps them survive in harsh, drought-prone environments where other lichens cannot establish.

== Taxonomy ==
The family was introduced by Elias Magnus Fries in 1861 under the name Phylliscei. Fries defined the group by a small, somewhat leaf-like thallus that is attached at a central point (umbilicate) and by fruiting bodies that are embedded in the thallus ("endocarpous" apothecia). In his treatment he placed Phylliscum as a representative genus. Fries' diagnosis of Phylliscum emphasised minute, mostly single-bladed thalli with the photosynthetic granules wrapped in a gelatinous layer; the apothecia are immersed and the spore sacs (asci) contain many simple, colourless, ellipsoid spores. He cited Phylliscum endocarpoides as a typical species and noted it on calcareous and siliceous rock faces in northern Scandinavia (Finnmark and Nordland), probably widespread across Arctic regions but easily overlooked because of its very small size.

The family has long been placed within the order Lichinales. A class-wide multilocus study published in 2024 re-examined relationships across Lichinomycetes and issued an emended circumscription of the family. That analysis, which sampled 190 specimens representing 126 species, showed that several traditional family and genus boundaries conflicted with DNA-based relationships and proposed a revised framework. Within this framework, genera such as Peltula, Phylliscum, Phyllisciella, Peccania, and allied small saxicolous cyanolichens are treated in Phylliscaceae.

== Description ==
Thallus form in the family ranges from crustose to squamulose or peltate rosettes composed of tiny, leaf-like scales attached at a point. Fruiting bodies are typically apothecia—small discs that may be slightly immersed in the thallus—and the asci produce numerous, minute, colourless spores. The photosynthetic partner (photobiont) is usually a unicellular cyanobacterium, which helps these lichens tolerate strong sunlight and periodic drying by rapidly resuming photosynthesis after wetting.

== Ecology and distribution ==
Species of Phylliscaceae are predominantly saxicolous (rock-dwelling) and favour well-lit, drought-prone microhabitats on both acidic and calcareous substrates. They are frequent components of biological crusts on exposed rock and soil in arid and semi-arid regions, but also occur where suitable "dry islands" exist in otherwise humid landscapes. The cyanobacterial partnerships common in the family help explain their role as early colonisers of bare mineral surfaces.

== Genera ==
Under the 2024 re-classification, Phylliscaceae accommodates small, mainly saxicolous cyanolichens, with generic limits and species assignments updated as phylogenetic results are incorporated into regional accounts.

- Allopyrenis M.Schultz & M. Prieto (2024) – 7 spp.
- Peccania A.Massal. ex Arnold (1858) – 13/14 spp.
- Peltula Nyl. (1853)
- Phylliscidium Forssell (1885) – 1 sp.
- Phyllisciella Henssen (1984)
- Phylliscum Nyl. (1855) – 6 spp.
