= Lepraria sylvicola =

Scientific classification
- Domain: Eukaryota
- Kingdom: Fungi
- Division: Ascomycota
- Class: Lecanoromycetes
- Order: Lecanorales
- Family: Stereocaulaceae
- Genus: Lepraria
- Species: L. sylvicola

Binomial name
- Lepraria sylvicola Orange (2006)

Species of lichen

Lepraria sylvicola is a species of leprose lichen in the family Stereocaulaceae. This crust-forming lichen grows primarily in woodlands across western Britain and Ireland. It appears as a powdery, bluish-white to pale blue-grey coating on tree bark and occasionally on rock surfaces. The species is particularly common on mature sessile oak trees in natural and semi-natural woodlands, where it often grows alongside mosses and other lichens. The species can be distinguished from similar-looking lichens by its unique combination of chemical compounds, which include roccellic acid and toensbergianic acid. While it occurs from sea level up to 440 metres in elevation, it is most frequently found in sheltered locations on tree trunks and large branches that are protected from direct rainfall.

== Taxonomy ==
Lepraria sylvicola was described as a new species in 2006 by the British lichenologist Alan Orange. The type specimen was collected in Scotland, near Fort William along Loch Linnhe, northwest of Corryhurrachan, at an elevation of 10 metres. It was found growing on Quercus petraea in woodland on 15 May 2004 by A. Orange (specimen no. 15013). The holotype is deposited in the National Museum of Wales. The species epithet sylvicola is derived from the Latin word for "inhabitant of woods", alluding to its frequent occurrence in woodlands across western Britain. Molecular analysis indicates that L. sylvicola is a monophyletic taxon that is genetically distinct from its close relatives.

== Description ==
This species forms a powdery, crust-like growth (the thallus) that appears bluish-white to pale blue-grey in colour. The thallus has a distinctive powdery texture made up of tiny granules measuring between 40 and 160 micrometres in diameter. Unlike some related species, it lacks an inner layer (medulla). Beneath the main body of the lichen, there are usually sparse fungal threads (hyphae) that range from white to pale orange-brown in colour.

When tested with common chemical reagents used in lichen spot tests, the thallus shows characteristic reactions: it turns yellow or shows no reaction with PD, becomes yellowish with K, and shows no reaction with C. Under ultraviolet light (UV), it shows no fluorescence. The underlying fungal threads turn purple-red when treated with K.

Chemical analysis has revealed several major secondary metabolites in this species, including roccellic acid, toensbergianic acid, and atranorin, along with minor amounts of anthraquinone pigments found only in the underlying fungal threads. The presence of roccellic acid was confirmed through mass spectrometry analysis of a specimen. Scientists note that another compound, angardianic acid, might also be present but cannot be distinguished from roccellic acid using standard identification techniques (thin-layer chromatography). The compound toensbergianic acid has shows distinctive chemical properties unlike any other fatty acids found in the genus Lepraria.

=== Similar species ===
The most closely related species is Lepraria jackii, which was historically confused with L. sylvicola until molecular studies demonstrated they were distinct species. While L. jackii appears very similar in its powdery, crust-like appearance, it can be distinguished by its chemical composition. Both species contain atranorin, but L. jackii is characterized by the presence of jackinic and rangiformic acids, whereas L. sylvicola contains roccellic acid as a major component.

Several other species can appear superficially similar to L. sylvicola, but can be distinguished through careful examination. L. atlantica, L. elobata, and L. neojackii share a similar morphology but have different chemical compositions that can be detected through standard testing methods. Other related species like L. celata and L. humida were also once grouped with L. jackii but are now recognised as separate species based on both molecular evidence and chemical analysis. In cases where visual identification proves challenging, chemical spot tests and analysis of the specific compounds present in the lichen provide the most reliable means of distinguishing L. sylvicola from its similar-looking relatives.

== Habitat, distribution, and ecology ==
Lepraria sylvicola is found throughout western Britain, including Wales, northern England, and western Scotland, as well as in Ireland. The lichen shows a strong preference for tree bark that is neutral to slightly acidic in pH. It is especially common on mature sessile oak (Quercus petraea) in natural and semi-natural woodlands. While oak is its primary substrate, it can also be found growing on other tree species including alder (Alnus glutinosa), downy birch (Betula pubescens), ash (Fraxinus excelsior), and rowan (Sorbus aucuparia). Occasionally, it can be found growing on rock surfaces, particularly in areas sheltered from direct rainfall and on slightly calcareous siliceous rock. It has also been reported from France.

The species occurs at elevations ranging from near sea level (10 metres) up to 440 metres above sea level, and can be locally abundant within its preferred habitats. In western British oak woodlands, it is often the dominant Lepraria species, typically growing on the rain-sheltered sides of tree trunks and large branches. It frequently grows alongside the moss Isothecium myosuroides, forming distinctive ecological communities.

In areas where its coverage is less extensive, the lichen can be found as part of diverse communities on sessile oak that include several rare or notable species from the Lobarion pulmonariae alliance. These associated species include Arthonia vinosa, Catinaria atropurpurea, Pannaria conoplea, Phyllopsora rosei, Porina hibernica, and Rinodina isidioides. Such communities typically develop on bark that is partially sheltered from rain. When growing on rock surfaces, the species has been documented in several distinct microhabitats: beneath bryophyte-rich overhangs in woodland settings, alongside Isothecium myosuroides in forested areas, and under upland overhangs where it grows with Lepraria diffusa.
