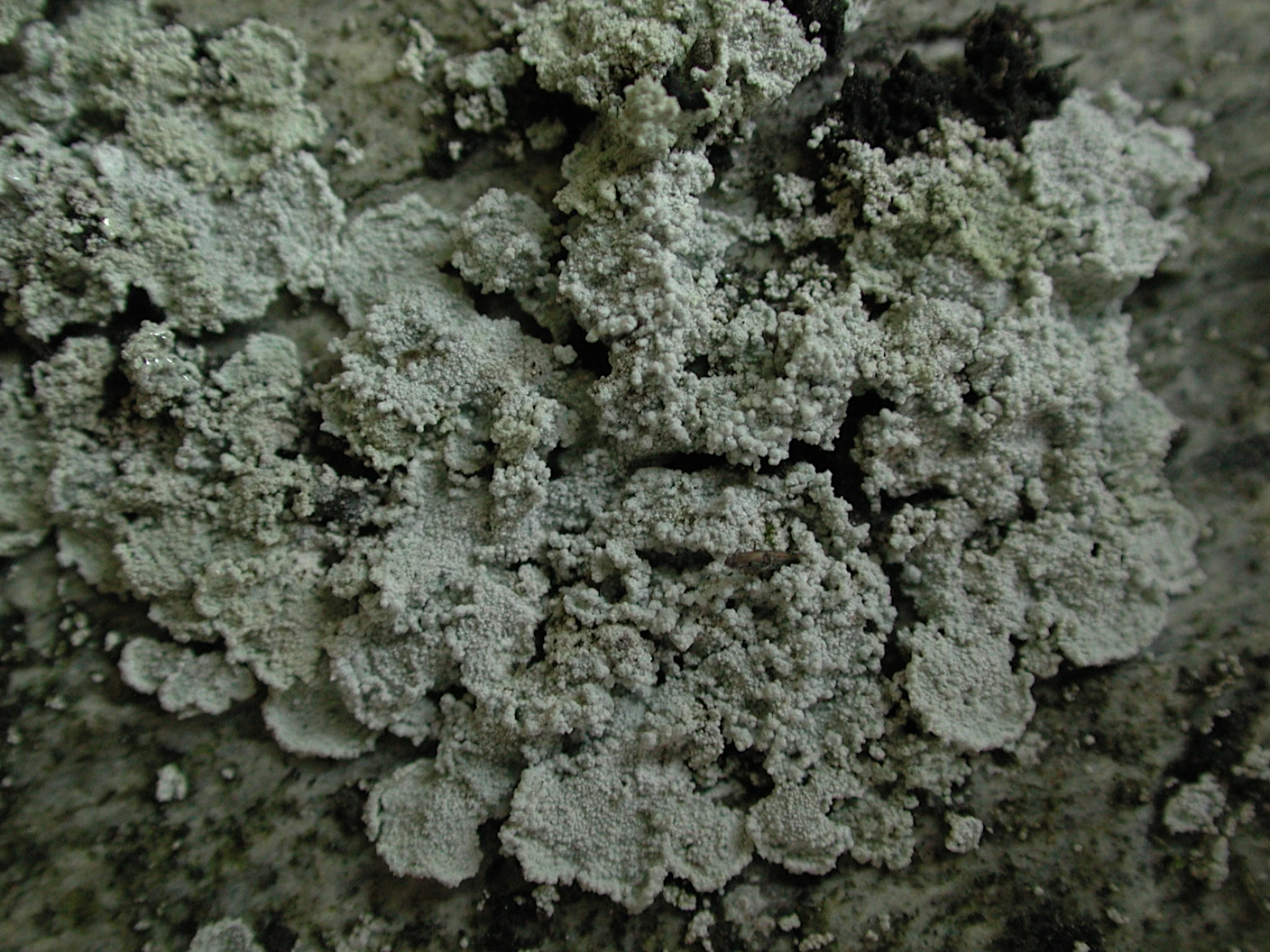

Scientific classification
- Kingdom: Fungi
- Division: Ascomycota
- Class: Lecanoromycetes
- Order: Lecanorales
- Family: Stereocaulaceae
- Genus: Lepraria
- Species: L. bergensis

Binomial name
- Lepraria bergensis Tønsberg (2002)
- Holotype: Åsane, Bergen, Norway

= Lepraria bergensis =

Species of lichen

Lepraria bergensis is an uncommon crustose lichen in the family Stereocaulaceae. It occurs in Northern and Central Europe, where it grows on siliceous (silicon-rich) rock walls, particularly under small overhangs, and on mosses on vertical to slightly sloping rock surfaces. The lichen thallus forms as a pale bluish-grey crust-like growth on rocks and mosses. The lichen begins as small, rounded patches a few millimetres wide, which may eventually coalesce into larger areas exceeding 1 centimetre in diameter. The thallus has a powdery texture, consisting of minute granules known as soredia and consoredia, which facilitate the lichen's asexual reproduction. The chemical composition of Lepraria bergensis is distinguished by the presence of several secondary metabolites: atranorin, rangiformic acid or jackinic acid, trace amounts of their respective derivatives, and a variety of anthraquinones. These chemical components cause the lichen to fluoresce a dull yellow under long-wave ultraviolet light.

== Taxonomy ==
The species was formally described as a new to science in 2002 by the Norwegian lichenologist Tor Tønsberg. The type locality was documented by Tønsberg in March 2002. This lichen was found in the municipality of Bergen (Hordaland region, Norway). The type specimen was collected in Åsane, at an elevation of 100 m (330 ft) meters above sea level. Here, Lepraria bergensis was found growing on mosses covering west-facing rock surfaces ranging from nearly vertical to slightly sloping. The species epithet refers to the municipality of Bergen where it was discovered.

Subsequent genetic analysis showed that Lepraria bergensis is basal to a clade consisting of the species L. isidiata and L. santosii.

== Description ==
Lepraria bergensis has a thallus that is pale bluish-grey and can form small, rounded rosettes up to a few millimeters in diameter. As the lichen matures, these rosettes often merge with other thalli, creating patches up to 1 centimeter or more in diameter. The thallus can be up to 220 micrometres (μm) thick, excluding loose soredia and consoredia. The lobes of Lepraria bergensis are distinct, especially in young specimens growing on rocks. These lobes can be a few millimetres wide and have sharply raised margins that reveal a white lower surface with colourless hyphae projecting outward. The upper surface is powdery and composed of loosely packed soredia (tiny reproductive granules) and consoredia (larger aggregations of soredia). The lower surface is whitish, at least along the margin, and can be pale yellowish or brown. The hypothallus, which forms the lower layer of the thallus, is inconspicuous and either absent or brown in colour.

Soredia are up to 25 μm in diameter, and consoredia can be up to 200 (sometimes up to 340) μm in diameter. Both are densely packed with crystals and may have short, projecting hyphae. The medulla (the inner layer of the thallus) is white and distinct only in patches. The photobiont (the photosynthetic partner) is trebouxioid and measures up to 16 μm in diameter.

The chemical profile of Lepraria bergensis includes several compounds: atranorin, fragilin, 7-chloroemodin, parietin, A01-athrone, emodin, and a mixture of rangiformic/jackinic acid along with trace amounts of their derivatives norrangiformic/norjackinic acid. The thallus surface is K−, C− and PD−, but the lower surface is K+ (purple).

== Similar species ==
The thallus of Lepraria bergensis shares similarities with Leproloma membranaceum, as both form small rosettes with well-defined, rounded lobes and elevated margins. However, it is morphologically distinct due to its bluish-grey surface colour and inconspicuous hypothallus, which is well-developed and cottony in L. membranaceum. Chemically, L. bergensis is different as it produces a set of anthraquinones, atranorin, and a fatty acid from the rangiformic/jackinic acid pair, whereas L. membranaceum produces dibenzofuran pannaric acid and roccellic acid.

In muscicolous specimens, the marginal lobes of Lepraria bergensis are less distinct, forming small rosettes similar to L. borealis and L. caesioalba. However, it is chemically distinct from these species due to the presence of anthraquinones and the absence of fumarprotocetrariac acid and roccellic acid.

Lepraria bergensis may be closely related to Leproloma sipmanianum, which is found in Africa and South America. Both species have distinctly lobed thalli with raised margins and produce the same set of anthraquinones. However, L. sipmanianum has a yellowish thallus surface, produces the dibenzofuran compound pannaric acid 6-methyl ester, and lacks atranorin and fatty acids.

== Habitat and distribution ==
Lepraria bergensis is primarily saxicolous (rock-dwelling), found under shallow overhang on siliceous rock walls. It also grows on moss-covered, nearly vertical to slightly sloping rocks. In its type locality, Lepraria bergensis is relatively common, frequently intermingling with Leproloma membranaceum to create mosaic-like patterns. It also coexists with other lichen species such as Cystocoleus ebeneus, Lepraria rigidula, and Parmelia saxatilis. At its second known Norwegian site in Åsane, it grows on mosses such as Andreaea and is associated with Lepraria neglecta. Lepraria bergensis was later reported by Alan Orange from a spruce plantation in Brynmawr (Great Britain) in 2005, and was formally documented from Deville, Ardennes (France) in 2007. It was also reported from Hesse, Germany, in 2007, where it was found on a sun-exposed cliff of green shale, growing on moss and humus.
