= Lepraria indica =

Scientific classification
- Kingdom: Fungi
- Division: Ascomycota
- Class: Lecanoromycetes
- Order: Lecanorales
- Family: Stereocaulaceae
- Genus: Lepraria
- Species: L. indica

Binomial name
- Lepraria indica Rajesh Bajpai & Upreti (2018)

Species of lichen

Lepraria indica is a species of leprose (powdery) crustose lichen in the family Stereocaulaceae. It was discovered in the Amarkantak region of Madhya Pradesh in central India, where it grows on rocks and soil in tropical forests at elevations between 150 and 500 metres. The lichen forms green to light grey powdery patches with distinctive lobed edges that have slightly raised rims and a thick white inner layer. Chemical analysis has identified several lichen substances in the species, including stictic acid, atranorin, and zeorin, which help distinguish it from similar powdery lichens.

== Taxonomy ==
Lepraria indica was described as new to science by Rajesh Bajpai and Dalip Kumar Upreti in a 2018 treatment of Indian Lepraria and Leprocaulon. The holotype specimen was collected in Madhya Pradesh (Anuppur District, Amarkantak, Mai-ki-Bagiya forest) on rock over soil. The epithet refers to India. The authors distinguished the species by its lobed, weak-rimmed margin and a clearly developed white medulla, and by a chemistry of stictic acid with atranorin and zeorin. They noted contrasts with superficially similar taxa: it shares chemistry with L. lobificans but has more strongly developed marginal lobes; resembles Leprocaulon coriense in form but differs chemically (L. coriense lacks stictic acid and has usnic acid with zeorin); and differs from L. santosii, L. elobata and L. caesioalba in its combination of well-formed lobes and chemistry. The key provided in the paper separates L. indica on its lobed, raised margin and distinct medulla.

== Description ==
The thallus is leprose (powdery to cottony) and soft, green to light grey, forming patches with well-developed marginal lobes that have a slightly raised rim. The inner layer (medulla) is well developed and usually thick, white; a basal hypothallus is rarely visible and then pale brown. The surface is sorediate, with abundant, loosely packed soredia (minute reproductive granules used for vegetative spread) generally fine and about 85–95 μm across, often well separated; short projecting hyphae can be seen among them. Spot tests are K+ (yellow), C−, KC− and Pd+ (yellow), consistent with the presence of stictic acid together with atranorin and zeorin (identified by thin-layer chromatography).

== Habitat and distribution ==
As of its original publication, the species was known only from a few localities in the Amarkantak area of central India, where it grows on rock and on soil over rock in tropical settings between about 150–500 m elevation (type and additional material from Mai ki Bagiya forest and nearby Shambhudhara). No occurrences outside this part of Madhya Pradesh were reported in the original account. It was later recorded from the Goodrical Reserve Forest in the Pathanamthitta district of Kerala.
