= Lepraria granulata =

Scientific classification
- Domain: Eukaryota
- Kingdom: Fungi
- Division: Ascomycota
- Class: Lecanoromycetes
- Order: Lecanorales
- Family: Stereocaulaceae
- Genus: Lepraria
- Species: L. granulata

Binomial name
- Lepraria granulata Slav.-Bay. (2007)

Species of lichen

Lepraria granulata is a species of crustose and leprose lichen in the family Stereocaulaceae. It is found in mountainous locations of Eastern and Central Europe, where it usually grows over moss.

== Taxonomy ==
Lepraria granulata was formally described as a new species in 2007 by Štěpánka Slavíková-Bayerová. The type specimen in Rila National Park (Rila mountains, Bulgaria) at an altitude of 2,384 m (7,822 ft); there, the lichen was found growing over the moss Grimmia sessitana, which itself was covering siliceous rock. The species epithet granulata alludes to the granular form of the thallus. Molecular phylogenetic analysis shows it to be a genetically distinct member of the Lepraria neglecta species complex.

== Description ==
The whitish grey to grey thallus of Lepraria granulata is crustose in form. It comprises tiny, loosely packed granules up to 0.3 mm in diameter, often without any hyphae projecting from them. The lichen is sterile, as neither ascomata nor conidiomata are produced. It contains atranorin, a common lichen product, some anthraquinones, as well as two unidentified fatty acids. The expected results of standard chemical spot tests are: thallus PD− or PD+ (faint yellowish), K+ (yellowish); the orange-brown hyphae present below the thallus are K+ (purple-red); while the other hyphae below the thallus are K−.

== Habitat and distribution ==
Lepraria granulata typically grows on moss, also it has been recorded on soil, in fissures between boulders, and over moss growing in these fissures. It has been documented at a few locations in Bulgaria at elevations ranging from 2,160 to 2,410 m (7,090 to 7,910 ft), and well as from Styria, Austria at 1,855 m (6,086 ft), from Krkonoše National Park in the Czech Republic at 1,359 m (4,459 ft), from Tatra National Park, Poland at 1,820 m (5,970 ft), and from Tatra National Park, Slovakia. Mosses often recorded growing with Lepraria granulata are Bartramia ithyphylla, Coscinodon cribrosus, Grimmia caespiticia, Dicranoweisia crispula, Grimmia cf. alpestris, G. sessitana, and Lescuraea incurvata. Lepraria borealis, L. elobata and L. neglecta are some commonly associating lichens.
