= Lepraria glaucosorediata =

Scientific classification
- Kingdom: Fungi
- Division: Ascomycota
- Class: Lecanoromycetes
- Order: Lecanorales
- Family: Stereocaulaceae
- Genus: Lepraria
- Species: L. glaucosorediata

Binomial name
- Lepraria glaucosorediata Flakus & Kukwa (2009)
- Holotype: near Cumbre pass, Murillo, Bolivia

Species of lichen-forming fungus

Lepraria glaucosorediata is a species of leprose lichen in the family Stereocaulaceae. It was formally described in 2009 from specimens collected in the Bolivian Andes at high elevation. The lichen is characterised by its thick, powdery crust with a distinctive bluish-grey tint and unusual soredial structure. It grows on rocks and mosses in humid, shaded locations within high-elevation puna grassland.

== Taxonomy ==
Lepraria glaucosorediata was described as new to science by Adam Flakus and Martin Kukwa in 2009. The authors had earlier treated the taxon informally as "Lepraria sp. 1" and later formalised it based on a distinctive suite of morphological and chemical characters. The epithet refers to the conspicuously bluish tint of the external soredia.

The holotype specimen was collected in the Bolivian Andes, La Paz Department (Prov. Murillo), near the Cumbre pass at 4,604 m (15,105 ft) elevation, on siliceous schist and rock-dwelling bryophytes.

== Description ==
The species forms a thick, powdery (leprose) crust with a well-delimited but non-lobed edge, colored green-gray to bluish-gray; patches can appear whitish where a compact medulla-like layer of soredia is exposed (a true medulla is absent). The underlying hypothallus is thin and not sharply set off, composed of white to brownish hyphae. Soredia—the tiny, powdery reproductive granules containing algal cells—are floury (farinose), rounded, and to about 30 micrometres (μm) across; they occur in two forms: (1) granules built around a single, relatively large algal cell (≈10–17 μm) and (2) granules with several smaller algal cells (≈5 μm). Aggregates (consoredia) are uncommon and can reach ~100 μm. The soredial wall is a key feature: it is complete and unusually thick (to ~5 μm, 1–4 cell layers) and may be hyaline or partly to entirely bluish-gray pigmented; projecting hyphae are absent. The photobiont is chlorococcoid (green, spherical cells to ~10–17 μm).

Spot test reactions are distinctive: the thallus is C+ (carmine red), P+ (orange), and mostly K+ (yellow); the bluish pigment in the soredial wall reacts C+ (orange to orange-brown) and K+ (olivaceous brown). Thin-layer chromatography shows alectorialic, lecanoric, and protocetraric acids; repeated checks across the thallus gave the same chemistry. In combination, the thick, blue-tinged soredial walls (without projecting hyphae), the two soredial types, and this chemistry separate the species from lookalikes. For example, L. incana can look similar but has divaricatic acid with zeorin and lacks the two soredial types; L. achariana and L. eburnea share parts of the chemistry but lack the bluish soredial pigment and have thinner or incomplete soredial walls (L. eburnea).

== Habitat and distribution ==
The type material grew on rock and on mosses over rock in a humid, shaded microhabitat within high-elevation Andean puna grassland. As of its original publication, the species was known only from the type locality in Bolivia.
