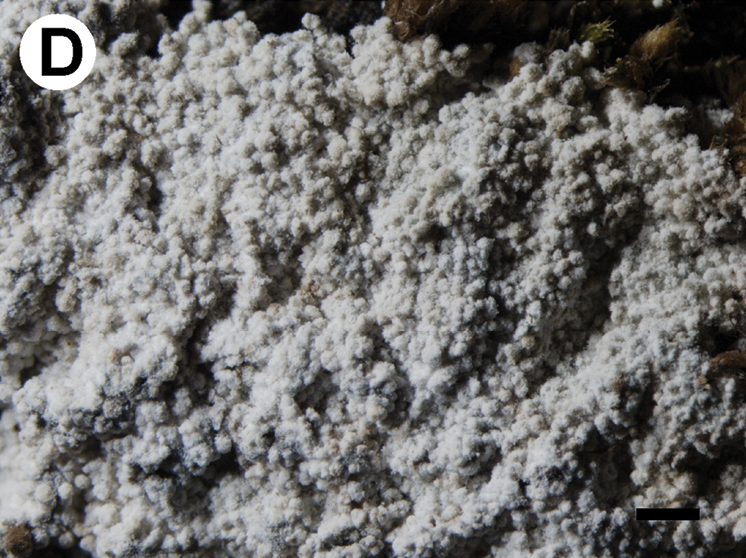

Scientific classification
- Domain: Eukaryota
- Kingdom: Fungi
- Division: Ascomycota
- Class: Lecanoromycetes
- Order: Lecanorales
- Family: Stereocaulaceae
- Genus: Lepraria
- Species: L. nothofagi

Binomial name
- Lepraria nothofagi Elix & Kukwa (2010)

= Lepraria nothofagi =

Species of lichen

Lepraria nothofagi is a species of corticolous (bark-dwelling) dust lichen in the family Stereocaulaceae. This species forms a thick, powdery white to ivory crust that reproduces exclusively through dust-like soredia, as it never develops the cup-shaped fruiting bodies (apothecia) common in many other lichens. Chemical analysis reveals a consistent profile of secondary metabolites, including atranorin, porphyrilic acid, and strepsilin, the last of which produces a characteristic green reaction when tested with calcium hypochlorite (bleach), providing a useful field identification method.

== Taxonomy ==
Lepraria nothofagi was described as new to science in 2011 by John A. Elix and Martin Kukwa after a survey of South American members of Lepraria revealed several previously unrecognised taxa. The holotype was collected on 28 December 1937 from the northern Patagonian Andes, where it formed a pale crust on the trunk of a southern beech (Nothofagus). The specific epithet reflects that ecological association. Within the genus it is most easily separated from the chemically similar L. lecanorica by its production of strepsilin and porphyrilic acid, and from chemotypes of L. xerophila by the absence of norascomatic acid as a major secondary metabolite. These distinctions were confirmed with thin-layer chromatography and high-performance liquid chromatography.

== Description ==
The thallus—the visible body of the lichen—forms a white to ivory, powdery crust that can reach several millimetres in thickness. At the margins it may show faint, irregular lobes, but it never develops the cup-shaped fruiting bodies (apothecia) seen in many other lichens; reproduction is entirely by soredia, minute bundles of fungal hyphae wrapped around algal cells that look like dust under a hand lens. Individual soredia are mostly 50–90 μm across, often clustering into larger consoredia up to about 0.2 mm; short, filamentous hyphae sometimes project from their surface, giving the thallus a slightly woolly appearance. Beneath the soredial layer there may be a paler, compact zone that functions as a primitive medulla, while a sparse hypothallus—strands of anchoring hyphae—attaches the lichen to the bark.

Chemical analysis shows a constant suite of secondary metabolites: atranorin (major), strepsilin and porphyrilic acid (both variable but usually conspicuous) and a trace of lecanoric acid; minor amounts of norascomatic acid, di-O-methylstrepsilin and pannaric acid have also been detected. When a drop of calcium hypochlorite (the "C" spot test) is placed on a fresh fragment the strepsilin produces a green reaction, a quick field test that supports laboratory results.

== Habitat and distribution ==
Lepraria nothofagi is known to occur only in the Andean–Patagonian forests of Neuquén Province, Argentina. All collections have been made on the trunks and larger branches of Nothofagus species—principally N. obliqua, N. dombeyi and N. pumilio—in cool, moist woodland often mixed with the conifer Austrocedrus chilensis. Sites are generally between 850 and 1000 m above sea level around lakes such as Quillén, Traful and Correntoso.
