= Lepraria pulchra =

Scientific classification
- Kingdom: Fungi
- Division: Ascomycota
- Class: Lecanoromycetes
- Order: Lecanorales
- Family: Stereocaulaceae
- Genus: Lepraria
- Species: L. pulchra

Binomial name
- Lepraria pulchra Orange & Wolseley (2005)

Species of lichen

Lepraria pulchra is a species of dust lichen in the family Stereocaulaceae. Found in Thailand, it was described as a new species in 2005. It contains thamnolic acid as its primary lichen product.
