= Lepraria leuckertiana =

Scientific classification
- Domain: Eukaryota
- Kingdom: Fungi
- Division: Ascomycota
- Class: Lecanoromycetes
- Order: Lecanorales
- Family: Stereocaulaceae
- Genus: Lepraria
- Species: L. leuckertiana

Binomial name
- Lepraria leuckertiana (Zedda) L.Saag (2009)

Synonyms
- Lecanora leuckertiana Zedda (2000)

Species of lichen

Lepraria leuckertiana is a species of leprose lichen in the family Stereocaulaceae. It occurs in Europe, North Africa, and South America, where it grows on bark and occasionally on soil in humid, open, well-lit places.

== Taxonomy ==
The lichen was first described as Lecanora leuckertiana by Luciana Zedda in 2000. While she noted its resemblance to the leprose genera Lepraria and Leproloma, she placed it in Lecanora based on its chemistry, which aligned more closely with that large genus. The species epithet honours the German lichen taxonomist Christian Leuckert.

In 2009, Lauri Saag transferred the species to Lepraria. The type specimen was collected in Italy. Despite its current classification in Lepraria, Alan Orange has suggested that it belongs in its original genus, Lecanora.

== Description ==
The species forms a cottony and powdery to granular thallus (lichen body) with either a diffuse or defined margin. Small, often inconspicuous lobes may be present. A well-developed white medulla (inner layer) is characteristic of the species. The thallus frequently shows patches of exposed medulla, with medullary hyphae mixed among the reproductive structures. These structures consist of abundant soredia up to 0.5 mm in diameter, which are not clearly separated from each other. The species is chemically characterised by the presence of usnic acid and zeorin, with traces of isousnic acid.

== Habitat and distribution ==
This lichen grows on bark and occasionally on soil in humid, open, well-lit places. It has been recorded from Europe, North Africa, and South America (Peru).
