= Lepraria salazinica =

Scientific classification
- Kingdom: Fungi
- Division: Ascomycota
- Class: Lecanoromycetes
- Order: Lecanorales
- Family: Stereocaulaceae
- Genus: Lepraria
- Species: L. salazinica

Binomial name
- Lepraria salazinica Tønsberg (2007)

Species of lichen

Lepraria salazinica is a species of rock-dwelling, leprose lichen in the family Stereocaulaceae. It is found in the eastern United States.

== Taxonomy ==
The lichen was described as a new species in 2007 by the Norwegian lichenologist Tor Tønsberg. The type specimen was collected by Tønsberg along Balsam Mountain road in the Great Smoky Mountains National Park. Here the lichen was growing on a rock under an overhang. The specific epithet refers to the presence of the secondary compound salazinic acid, which is rare in the genus Lepraria. It also contains atranorin and angardianic/roccellic acid. Lepraria multiacida is another species in the genus known to produce salazinic acid, but only in minor amounts along with other substances.

== Description ==
The lichen has a thin, grayish-white powdery to granular thallus that forms small patches on the rock surface. The photobiont partner of the lichen is trebouxioid: spherical unicellular green algae with cells measuring up to 13 μm in diameter. The distribution of the lichen is not well known, but it has been recorded from North Carolina and Tennessee.
