= Lepraria lecanorica =

Scientific classification
- Kingdom: Fungi
- Division: Ascomycota
- Class: Lecanoromycetes
- Order: Lecanorales
- Family: Stereocaulaceae
- Genus: Lepraria
- Species: L. lecanorica

Binomial name
- Lepraria lecanorica Tønsberg (2004)

Species of lichen

Lepraria lecanorica is a species of leprose lichen in the family Stereocaulaceae. It occurs in North and South America, where it grows on bark, rock, and soil substrates, typically in shaded locations.

== Taxonomy ==
Lepraria lecanorica was formally described by the Norwegian lichenologist Tor Tønsberg in 2004. The holotype was collected by Tønsberg on April 18, 2001 in Coconino National Forest, Arizona, USA. It was found at an elevation of 1,675–1,710 m (5,495–5,610 ft) on a dry, west-facing slope with Pseudotsuga menziesii and Pinus. The lichen was growing on the shaded base of an oak trunk. The specimen, designated Tønsberg 28991, is deposited at the herbarium of the University Museum of Bergen (BG).

James Lendemer suggests that molecular studies are necessary to clarify whether Lepraria lecanorica is a distinct species or merely a chemical variant (a chemotype) of L. neglecta, the only species with which it is likely to be confused.

== Description ==
The species forms a powdery to membranous thallus (lichen body) with a defined margin. While lobes may sometimes be present, they are poorly defined. The thallus contains a medulla (inner layer) that varies from indistinct to clearly visible, appearing white. The lower surface can sometimes be visible, ranging from white to pale brown, and typically lacks a tomentum (fuzzy covering). The reproductive structures consist of abundant coarse soredia measuring up to 0.2 mm in diameter, which occasionally have short projecting hyphae. The species is chemically characterised by the presence of lecanoric acid and atranorin. Chemical spot tests show K+ (yellowish), C+ (pink/red), KC+ (pink/red), P−, and UV−.

Although there are a few other Lepraria species that contain lecanoric acid (L. achariana, L. cupressicola, L. goughensis, and L. impossibilis), they can be distinguished from L. lecanorica by morphological and chemical characteristics.

== Habitat and distribution ==
This lichen grows on bark, rock, and soil substrates, typically in shaded locations. It has been recorded from both North and South America. In South America, it is found in Bolivia and Chile.
