= Christian Leuckert =

German lichenologist and analytical organic chemist

- Born: March 27, 1930; Radeberg, near Dresden.
- Died: January 27, 2011 (aged 80); Berlin
- Education: University of Leipzig; Free University of Berlin
- Awards: Acharius Medal
- Scientific career
- Thesis: “The lignan glycoside arctiin, as a chemotaxonomic feature in the family Compositae. (Das Lignanglykosid Arctiin, als chemotaxonomisches Merkmal in der Familie der Compositen) (1965)
- Doctoral advisors: Rudolf Hänsel
- Author abbrev. (botany): Leuckert

Christian Leuckert was a lichen taxonomist who applied the diversity of secondary metabolites within lichens as useful taxonomic criteria. He was Director of the Institute of Plant Systematics and Plant Geography at the Free University of Berlin from the 1970s until 1995.

== Early life and education ==
Christian Leuckert's parents were Alfred and Louise (née Friedrich) Leuckert. His father worked as an expert plumber. After elementary school in Radeberg, he began attending a Rudolph Steiner school in Dresden, until it was officially closed in 1941. He completed his secondary education in Radeberg. After the Second World War he found himself in the German Democratic Republic. He was able to complete his education from 1946 - 1948 at the re-opened Steiner school. He then trained as a teacher at Technical University of Dresden and Martin Luther University in Halle-Wittenberg.

In 1954 he was allowed to re-start his education, studying biology at University of Leipzig. However, in 1955 he moved to West German and enrolled for biology and chemistry at the Free University of Berlin. In 1961 he started his doctoral research on chemotaxonomy within the Asteraceae under the supervision of Rudolf Hänsel, Director of the Institute for Pharmacognosy at the Berlin Botanical Garden and Botanical Museum. The PhD degree was awarded in 1965. Über Anthocyane und verwandte Verbindungen bei den Centrospermen“

== Career ==
Leuckert initially worked as a junior school teacher in Leipzig. However, after his later academic studies at the Free University of Berlin he pursued an academic career. From 1962 until 1965 Leukert held a part-time scientific assistant position at the Institute for Pharmacognosy at the Free University of Berlin, which became a full-time post after he gained his PhD. In 1966 he began to apply his knowledge to lichens after being recruited by Josef Poelt, the lichenologist newly appointed as the Professor of Systematic Botany at the Institute of Plant Systematics and Plant Geography at the Free University of Berlin. Leuckert turned out to have organisational and management skills that were used as the Institute developed, including during the construction and out-fitting of a new building in the grounds of the botanic garden. He gained his habilitation in 1970 and was promoted to a professorship. He remained at the Institute of Plant Systematics and Plant Geography until he retired in 1995.

His research and teaching focused on analysis of the secondary metabolites of lichens for taxonomy, adopting new technologies such as mass spectrometry as they became available. He collaborated with many other research groups, especially those expert in morphology, where he provided the chemical analysis component in projects. He was particularly interested in xanthones, not only their structure but also their sub-cellular locations. His own work was primarily on genera within the Lecanorales, notably Acarospora, Cladonia, Dimelaena, Lecanora, Lecidea, Lepraria, Lobothallia, Parmelia, Pertusaria, Ophioparma and Rhizoplaca.

== Publications ==
Leuckert was the author or co-author of at least 94 scientific papers and book chapters. His most significant publications include:

- Leuckert, Ch. (1984) Die Identifizierung von Flechtenstoffen im Rahmen chemotaxonomischer Routineanalysen. in: Hertel, H. & Oberwinkler, F. (eds.) Beiträge zur Lichenologie. Festschrift J. Poelt. – Beiheft Nova Hedwigia 79: 839 –869.

== Honours and awards ==
At his retirement in 1995, when he was 65 years old, a Festschrift was held and published as Studies in lichenology with emphasis on chemotaxonomy, geography and phytochemistry: Festschrift Christian Leuckert with 55 contributions. In 1996 he was awarded the Acharius Medal by the International Association for Lichenology in recognition of his lifetime's work. In 2000 he was made an honorary member of the Italian Society of Lichenology.

Several lichen have been named after him, including Lecanora leuckertiana Zedda (2000) (= Lepraria leuckertiana (Zedda) L.Saag (2009)); Lecidella leuckertiana Knoph & Mies (1995); Mycomicrothelia leuckertii D. Hawksw. & J.C.David (1995); Opegrapha leuckertii S. Y. Kondr. & DJ Galloway (1995) (= Plectocarpon leuckertii (S.Y.Kondr. & D.J.Galloway) Ertz & Diederich (2005)) and Sclerococcum leuckertii Diederich & P.Scholz (1995).

== Personal life ==
He met Eva Schwabhäuser when they were both teachers at an elementary school near Meissen. In 1955 they left for Berlin in West Germany, pretending they were going for a short holiday. They married on 1 June 1955. She trained as a junior school teacher. They had two children together. He died 27 January 2011.
