= Lepraria celata =

Scientific classification
- Kingdom: Fungi
- Division: Ascomycota
- Class: Lecanoromycetes
- Order: Lecanorales
- Family: Stereocaulaceae
- Genus: Lepraria
- Species: L. celata

Binomial name
- Lepraria celata Slav.-Bay. (2006)
- Holotype: Terentyn Mountain, Ukraine

Species of lichen

Lepraria celata is a species of leprose lichen in the family Stereocaulaceae. The powdery greyish-green lichen, described as a new species in 2006, occurs in eastern Europe.

== Taxonomy ==
The species was described as new to science by Šárka Slavíková-Bayerová in 2006. The type specimen was collected in Ukraine and is housed in the Charles University Herbarium, Prague (PRA). The type specimen was collected in western Ukraine, in the Eastern Carpathians, north of Rakhiv. It was found on the western slope of Terentin Mountain, near its peak, at an elevation of 1,351 m (4,432 ft). The specimen was growing in a shaded fissure of siliceous rocks above the tree line. It was collected on 19 July 2004 by S. Bayerová (specimen number 3448) and is preserved as the holotype in the Charles University (PRA) herbarium. The species epithet celata is derived from the Latin word meaning "hidden", referring to the species' long period of being unrecognised.

== Description ==
This lichen forms a powdery grey-green to pale grey crust with edges that can be either diffuse or clearly defined. It lacks lobes and has no true inner layer (medulla). The base layer (hypothallus) consists of sparse patches of white threads (hyphae). The reproductive structures consist of abundant fine powder-like granules (soredia) typically measuring 35–50 (although sometimes as low as 20 or as much as 60) μm in diameter. Projecting threads are rarely present on these granules, and when present are short.

The species contains atranorin (which can vary from major to minor quantities) and roccellic/angardianic acid. The results of standard chemical spot tests are K− or + (faint yellowish), C−, and Pd−.

== Habitat and distribution ==
Lepraria celata grows on soil and plant litter, and on mosses, often in rock crevices. It occurs in open habitats. The species was initially found in Europe (Bulgaria and Ukraine), and is thought to have a wider distribution. Other lichen species that have been found to associate with L. celata include Lecanora intricata, Lepraria eburnea, L. vouauxii, Umbilicaria deusta, and Umbilicaria cylindrica.
