= Lepraria humida =

Scientific classification
- Domain: Eukaryota
- Kingdom: Fungi
- Division: Ascomycota
- Class: Lecanoromycetes
- Order: Lecanorales
- Family: Stereocaulaceae
- Genus: Lepraria
- Species: L. humida

Binomial name
- Lepraria humida Slav.-Bay. & Orange (2006)

Species of lichen

Lepraria humida is a species of leprose lichen in the family Stereocaulaceae. Found in northern Europe and northeastern North America, it grows on siliceous rocks, often between mosses, typically on rain-sheltered damp surfaces.

== Taxonomy ==
Lepraria humida was described by Štěpánka Slavíková-Bayerová and Alan Orange in 2006. The holotype specimen was collected by Orange on 25 January 2005 in Merioneth, Wales (VC 48), near Rhyd-y-sarn, at an elevation of 90 m (300 ft). It was found on a shaded, rain-sheltered siliceous rock face in Quercus petraea woodland. The specimen (Orange 15754) is deposited at National Museum in Prague (PRA). The species epithet humida is derived from the Latin word for moist or damp, referring to its preference for wetter, moss-rich habitats compared to other species in the genus.

== Description ==
Lepraria humida forms a leprose, powdery thallus. The margin varies from diffuse to delimited, and any lobes present are obscure and poorly developed. The medulla is absent, but the hypothallus is weakly developed, sparse, and pale orange-brown in colour. The soredia are abundant and range from fine to medium-sized, measuring 40–100 (sometimes up to 160) micrometres in diameter, and lack projecting hyphae. The species typically contains atranorin, jackinic/rangiformic acid, norjackinic/norrangiformic acid (in minor amounts), angardianic/roccellic acid (in minor amounts), and unknown anthraquinones (in minor amounts, found only in the subthalline hyphae). Some specimens have been found to contain stictic and constictic acids, though these were interpreted as contamination. Spot tests show K+ yellowish on the thallus, with subthalline hyphae showing K+ (purple-red), C−, Pd− or + (yellow).

== Habitat, distribution, and ecology ==
Lepraria humida is found in Great Britain, with confirmed records from Wales, northwest England, and Scotland, supported by internal transcribed spacer sequencing. It typically grows on rain-sheltered siliceous rock surfaces, often in semi-natural woodlands on vertical or low rock faces that retain enough moisture to support bryophytes. However, it is also found in bryophyte-poor habitats, such as cliffs and block scree in open landscapes. The species has been recorded at elevations ranging from 40 to 600 m (130 to 1,970 ft). In North America, it occurs throughout eastern North America, from the Appalachian Mountains extending to eastern Canada. It was reported as new to Fennoscandia in 2017, when it was recorded on siliceous outcrops in Illogruvan. The distribution of Lepraria humida is likely underestimated, as it is often overlooked in the field or mistaken for more common species within the widespread L. neglecta group.

It frequently occurs alongside other lichens, including Cystocoleus ebeneus, Lepraria bergensis, L. incana, L. membranacea, Micarea botryoides, Opegrapha gyrocarpa, and Psilolechia lucida, as well as bryophytes such as Cynodontium bruntonii, Dicranum scoparium, Diphyscium foliosum, and Diplophyllum albicans.
