= Lepraria brasiliensis =

Scientific classification
- Kingdom: Fungi
- Division: Ascomycota
- Class: Lecanoromycetes
- Order: Lecanorales
- Family: Stereocaulaceae
- Genus: Lepraria
- Species: L. brasiliensis

Binomial name
- Lepraria brasiliensis Elix, A.A.Spielm. & Øvstedal (2010)
- Holotype: Parque Natural do Caraça, Brazil

Species of lichen

Lepraria brasiliensis is a species of dust lichen in the family Stereocaulaceae. Found in Brazil, it was formally described as a new species in 2010 by John Elix, Adriano Spielmann, and Dag Øvstedal. It has a thin, greyish-green leprose (powdery) thallus up to 10 cm (4 in) wide that grows on bark. The holotype was collected in April 2006 from Caraça Natural Park (Parque Natural do Caraça) in Catas Altas, Minas Gerais, Brazil. The specimen, designated as Spielmann, Canez & Marcelli 2345, was found growing on the trunk of a Eucalyptus tree in open forest at 1,265 m (4,150 ft) elevation. The lichen is characterized chemically by the presence of thamnolic acid and atranorin as lichen products.
