= Lepraria juanfernandezii =

Scientific classification
- Domain: Eukaryota
- Kingdom: Fungi
- Division: Ascomycota
- Class: Lecanoromycetes
- Order: Lecanorales
- Family: Stereocaulaceae
- Genus: Lepraria
- Species: L. juanfernandezii

Binomial name
- Lepraria juanfernandezii M.Kukwa (2019)

Species of lichen

Lepraria juanfernandezii is a species of dust lichen in the family Stereocaulaceae. It was formally described as a new species by Martin Kukwa in 2019. The type was collected from Robinson Crusoe Island (Juan Fernández Islands, Chile). Here it was found growing on bryophytes that were growing on a rock. It is only known from the type locality. The lichen contains divaricatic acid, a secondary metabolite known to exist in six other Lepraria species.
