= Lepraria alpina =

Scientific classification
- Domain: Eukaryota
- Kingdom: Fungi
- Division: Ascomycota
- Class: Lecanoromycetes
- Order: Lecanorales
- Family: Stereocaulaceae
- Genus: Lepraria
- Species: L. alpina

Binomial name
- Lepraria alpina (B.de Lesd.) Tretiach & Baruffo (2006)

Synonyms
- Crocynia alpina B.de Lesd. (1914)

Species of lichen

Lepraria alpina is a species of leprose lichen in the family Stereocaulaceae. It is found in Europe, North and South America, Antarctica, and Greenland, where it typically grows on rocks and rock-dwelling mosses in cool habitats.

== Taxonomy ==
The species was first described as Crocynia alpina by Maurice Bouly de Lesdain in 1914, and was later transferred to the genus Lepraria by Mauro Tretiach and Loris Baruffo in 2006. The type specimen was collected in the United States and is now housed at Uppsala University Herbarium (UPS).

== Description ==
This lichen forms a granular crust with edges that are usually clearly defined. Small, often obscure lobes may be present, but these lack raised rims. The lichen has a usually present but inconspicuous white medulla. The base layer (hypothallus) is sometimes present but poorly developed. The reproductive structures consist of abundant coarse granules (soredia), typically 100–150 μm in diameter, which sometimes have short projecting threads (hyphae). These soredia often cluster into larger groups (consoredia) of 200–300 μm.

The species contains atranorin, porphyrilic acid, and a fatty acid (either roccelic/angardianic acid or more rarely rangiformic acid). Very rarely, the fatty acids and/or atranorin may be absent. The expected results of standard chemical spot tests are K− or + (yellow), C−, KC− or + (yellow), Pd− or + (yellow).

== Habitat and distribution ==
Lepraria alpina grows primarily on rock and saxicolous (rock-dwelling) mosses, but can also be found on soil, lichens and rarely bark. It typically grows on acidic substrates and can be found in both exposed and shaded places, mostly in cool climates. The species has been recorded from Europe, North and South America, Antarctica, and Greenland.
