= Lepraria leprolomopsis =

Scientific classification
- Kingdom: Fungi
- Division: Ascomycota
- Class: Lecanoromycetes
- Order: Lecanorales
- Family: Stereocaulaceae
- Genus: Lepraria
- Species: L. leprolomopsis

Binomial name
- Lepraria leprolomopsis Diederich & Sérus. (1997)
- Holotype: Mount Wilhelm area, Papua New Guinea

Species of lichen

Lepraria leprolomopsis is a little-known species of corticolous (bark-dwelling) leprose lichen in the family Stereocaulaceae. It is found in Papua New Guinea.

== Taxonomy ==
Lepraria leprolomopsis was described by Paul Diederich and Emmanuël Sérusiaux in 1997. The type specimen had previously (9 August 1992) been collected by Harrie Sipman in the Mount Wilhelm area of Chimbu Province, Papua New Guinea. In this location it was growing as an epiphyte in a mossy mountain forest, at an elevation of 2,800 m (9,200 ft).

== Description ==
The species forms a powdery to cottony thallus (lichen body) with a typically well-defined margin but no lobes. It has a distinctive white medulla (inner layer) and usually develops a poorly formed white hypothallus (attachment layer). The lower surface appears even and white, with little to no fuzzy covering. The reproductive structures consist of abundant medium-sized soredia (75–125 μm in diameter), which sometimes have projecting hyphae. These soredia often cluster into larger groups called consoredia, measuring 150–300 μm across. The species can be identified by its combination of secondary metabolites, which include atranorin and several related substances in the stictic acid group, along with an unknown terpenoid compound.

== Habitat and distribution ==
This lichen grows on tree bark and associated mosses. It is known only from Papua New Guinea in Australasia. In addition to its type locality in Chimbu, it has also been found in Madang and the Eastern Highlands.
