= Lepraria sekikaica =

Scientific classification
- Domain: Eukaryota
- Kingdom: Fungi
- Division: Ascomycota
- Class: Lecanoromycetes
- Order: Lecanorales
- Family: Stereocaulaceae
- Genus: Lepraria
- Species: L. sekikaica

Binomial name
- Lepraria sekikaica Elix (2011)

Species of lichen

Lepraria sekikaica is a species of leprose (powdery) lichen in the family Lecanoraceae. Found in Western Australia, it was formally described as a new species by lichenologist John Elix. It was one of 100 new lichen species published in a single article, helping to highlight the extent of undiscovered global biodiversity. The type specimen was collected by the author in the Boyagin Rock Nature Reserve. It is known from several locations in Western Australia, where it grows on the ground under sheltered rock ledges. The lichen products made by Lepraria sekikaica include atranorin, homosekikaic acid, 4'-O-demethylsekikaic acid, and fragilin as minor products, and sekikaic acid as a major metabolite. The specific epithet refers to the latter compound; Lepraria sekikaica is the first known in genus Lepraria to contain this substance.
