= Lepraria aurescens =

Scientific classification
- Kingdom: Fungi
- Division: Ascomycota
- Class: Lecanoromycetes
- Order: Lecanorales
- Family: Stereocaulaceae
- Genus: Lepraria
- Species: L. aurescens

Binomial name
- Lepraria aurescens Orange & Wolseley (2005)
- Holotype: Doi Suthep, Thailand

Species of lichen

Lepraria aurescens is a species of leprose lichen in the family Stereocaulaceae. It occurs in Thailand.

== Taxonomy ==
The species was described as new to science by Alan Orange and Pat Wolseley in 2005. The type specimen was collected in Thailand, within Chiang Mai province, at Doi Suthep along the transect near Wat Palad. The collection site, situated at an elevation of 680 m (2,230 ft), is characterised by dry evergreen forest. The specimen was found growing on bark and was collected on 25 November 1991 by Wolseley and B. Aguirre-Hudson (specimen number 5001). It is preserved as the holotype in the British Museum (BM) herbarium.

== Description ==
This lichen forms a powdery crust with undefined edges and no lobes. While it lacks a true inner layer (medulla), it usually has patches of a brown, well-developed, loose base layer (hypothallus). The reproductive structures consist of abundant to sparsely distributed powder-like granules (soredia) measuring 40–100 μm in diameter. While projecting threads (hyphae) are usually absent from these granules, they may be present on marginal or solitary granules, where they appear long and point downward, and are mostly dark in colour.

The species contains thamnolic acid as its main secondary metabolite. The expected results in standard chemical spot tests are K+ (bright yellow), C−, KC−, and Pd+ (orange-yellow).

== Habitat and distribution ==
Lepraria aurescens grows on bark in sheltered places within dry forest habitats. The species is only known to occur in Thailand.
