= Lepraria multiacida =

Scientific classification
- Domain: Eukaryota
- Kingdom: Fungi
- Division: Ascomycota
- Class: Lecanoromycetes
- Order: Lecanorales
- Family: Stereocaulaceae
- Genus: Lepraria
- Species: L. multiacida

Binomial name
- Lepraria multiacida Aptroot (2002)

Species of lichen

Lepraria multiacida is a species of saxicolous and terricolous (rock- and ground-dwelling), crustose lichen in the family Stereocaulaceae, described as a new species in 2002. It has a unique chemical composition and contains several secondary metabolites.

== Taxonomy ==
Described by André Aptroot in 2002, Lepraria multiacida was identified in the Serra do Caraça in Minas Gerais, Brazil. This species is notable for its complex mixture of secondary metabolites (lichen products), distinguishing it from closely related species such as Lepraria nivalis and Lepraria crassissima.

== Description ==
The thallus of Lepraria multiacida is crustose, extending over several decimetres, and up to 2 mm thick. It has a cream to whitish colour, composed of irregular granules on a sometimes whiter or occasionally blackened medulla. The medulla may predominantly consist of hyphae, forming a kind of base layer (hypothallus). The margins of the thallus may display slightly effigurate (decoratively marginated) lobes up to 0.5 mm wide, which are considerably thinner, up to 0.2 mm thick. The granules are about 0.1–0.2 mm in diameter, with protruding hyphae up to 100 μm long. The algae within the thallus are of the chlorococcoid type, i.e.,green algae with a coccoid shape.

Chemically, the thallus reacts K+ (yellow-orange) when treated with potassium hydroxide solution, but is unreactive to KC and C tests. It contains a rich set of secondary metabolites (lichen products) including atranorin, zeorin, norstictic acid, stictic acid, constictic acid, salazinic acid, connorstictic acid, consalazinic acid, and two unidentified terpenoids.

== Habitat and distribution ==
Lepraria multiacida is locally common on natural sandstone outcrops as well as on walls and soils between boulders. It often coexists with species such as Heterodermia speciosa and members of the genera Cladonia and Parmotrema.
