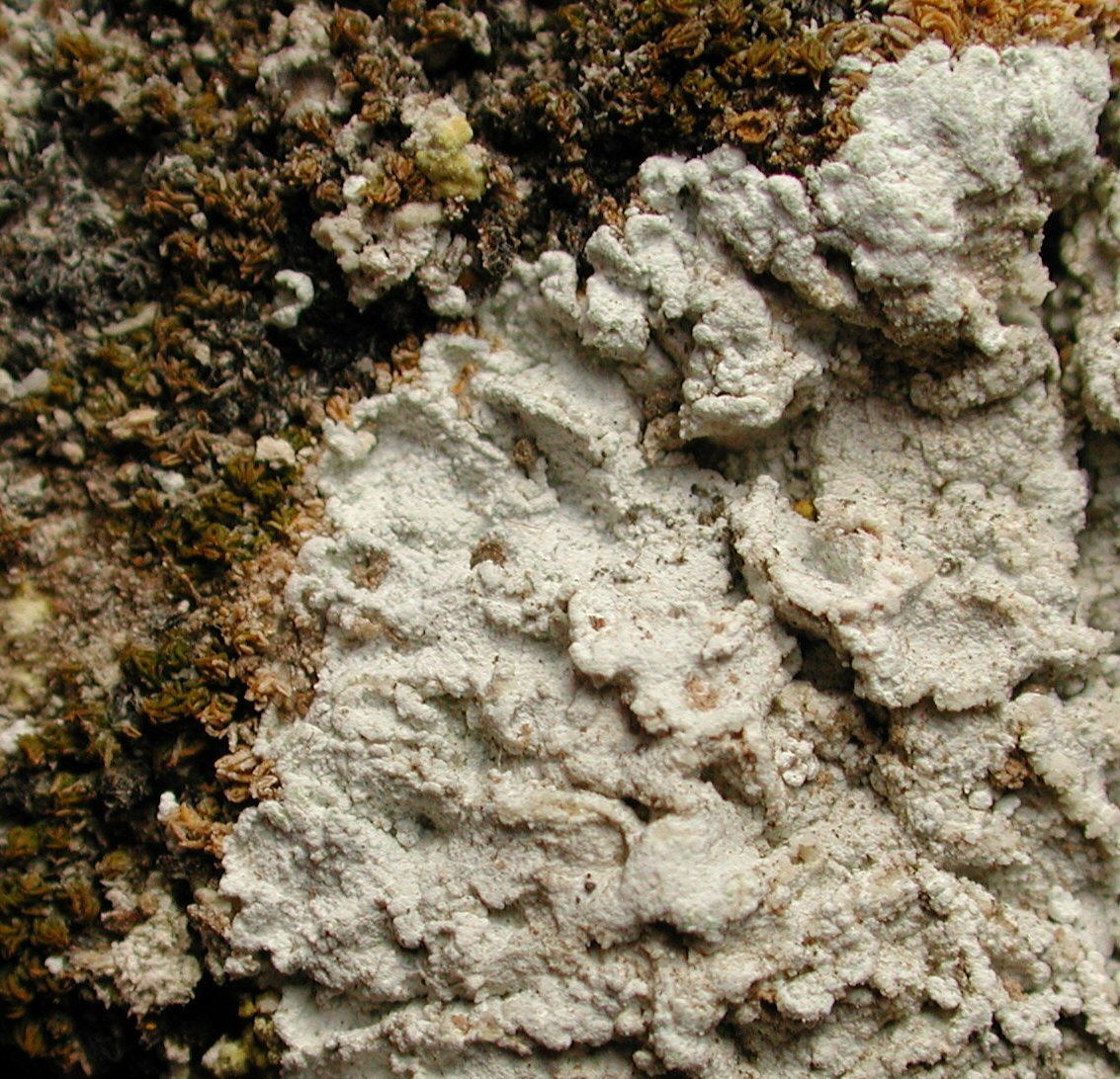

Scientific classification
- Domain: Eukaryota
- Kingdom: Fungi
- Division: Ascomycota
- Class: Lecanoromycetes
- Order: Lecanorales
- Family: Stereocaulaceae
- Genus: Lepraria
- Species: L. isidiata

Binomial name
- Lepraria isidiata (Llimona) Llimona & A.Crespo (2004)

Synonyms
- Lepraria crassissima var. isidiata Llimona (1973)

= Lepraria isidiata =

Species of lichen

Lepraria isidiata is a species of leprose lichen in the family Stereocaulaceae. It occurs in Mediterranean Europe, where it grows on calcareous soil and rock surfaces.

== Taxonomy ==
Lepraria isidiata was first described by Xavier Llimona in 1973 as a variety of Lepraria crassissima. It was later elevated to species status by Llimona and Ana Crespo in 2004. The type specimen was collected in Spain.

== Description ==
The species forms a crustose to subfoliose thallus that ranges from membranous to granular in texture. It has a well-defined margin with distinct lobes that have raised edges. The thallus sometimes develops a light brownish hypothallus (attachment layer), and may have patches with a subcorticate (partially corticate) surface. One of its most distinctive features is the presence of coarse granules that resemble true isidia, measuring 0.32–0.54 mm in diameter. These structures have a compact outer layer and lack projecting hyphae. The granules often become sorediate (producing powder-like reproductive structures).

== Chemistry ==
Lepraria impossibilis produces three chemotypes, all containing atranorin and roccellic acid (which may be present or absent). Chemotype 1 includes fumarprotocetraric acid and protocetraric acid, while chemotype 2 contains only fumarprotocetraric acid. Chemotype 3, which is rare, features protocetraric acid instead of fumarprotocetraric acid. Chemical spot tests yield K− or K+ (yellow), C−, KC− or KC+ (yellow), and Pd+ (reddish orange), while the hypothallus is Pd−.

== Development ==
When a granule becomes detached and establishes itself on a substrate, it undergoes a distinctive developmental process to form a new thallus. The granule first develops polarity and inflates, forming an opening at its upper pole. The broken edges then thicken through hyphal growth, developing the characteristic rolled appearance that will persist in the mature thallus. As development continues, the margins grow radially to form a small, concave, dorsiventral structure that resembles a miniature version of the adult thallus.

== Habitat and distribution ==
The species grows on calcareous soil and rock surfaces, sometimes colonising mosses. It shows a preference for sun-exposed, arid habitats that receive direct rainfall, and can be found in various exposed settings like road escarpments and areas with sparse annual vegetation. The species occurs in both Mediterranean and sub-Mediterranean vegetation belts. While it was long considered endemic to gypsum outcrops in the Mediterranean basin, it has since been documented on various calcareous substrates. It is typically found in shaded but well-lit locations. Its distribution is currently known to be limited to Mediterranean countries in Europe.
