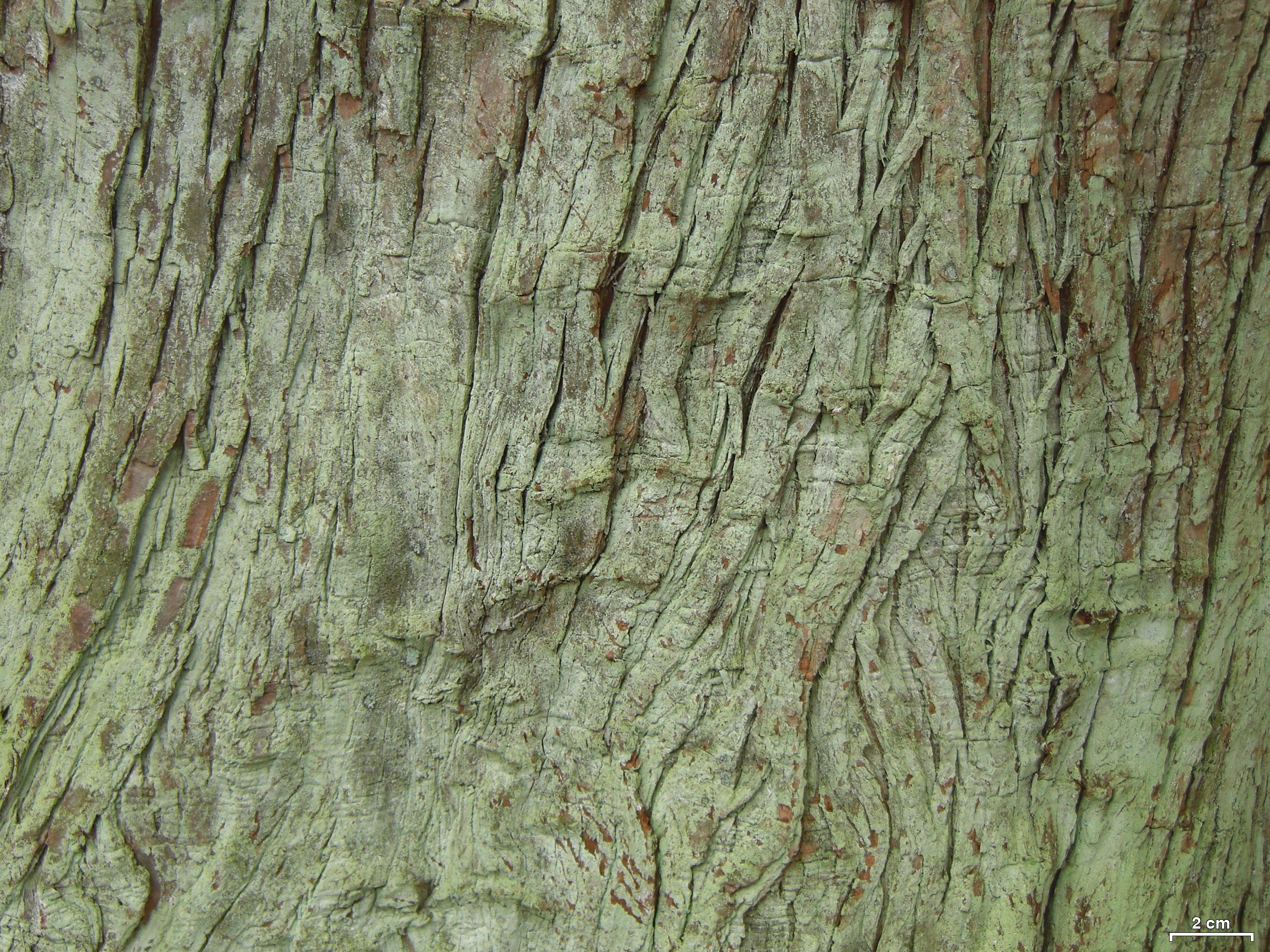

Scientific classification
- Kingdom: Fungi
- Division: Ascomycota
- Class: Lecanoromycetes
- Order: Lecanorales
- Family: Stereocaulaceae
- Genus: Lepraria
- Species: L. friabilis

Binomial name
- Lepraria friabilis Lendemer, K.Knudsen & Elix (2008)

= Lepraria friabilis =

Species of lichen

Lepraria friabilis is a species of leprose lichen in the family Stereocaulaceae. It has a disjunct distribution in the southeastern United States and southern California, where it grows exclusively on coniferous bark in humid environments such as swamps and stream valleys.

== Taxonomy ==
Lepraria friabilis was described as a new species by the lichenologists James Lendemer, Kerry Knudsen, and John Elix in 2008. The holotype specimen was collected by Lendemer on April 12, 2007 in the Splinter Hill Bog Preserve, Baldwin County, Alabama, USA. Found at an elevation of 250 ft (76 m), it was growing on Pinus in a Sarracenia (pitcher plant) bog with adjacent hardwood swamp and bottomlands along a stream. The species epithet friabilis refers to the lichen's delicate, crumbly appearance, particularly when the thallus forms small, scattered heaps of granules.

== Description ==
Lepraria friabilis forms a leprose, powdery thallus. The margin is diffuse, without lobes. The medulla is absent, while the hypothallus is present but thin, colourless, and inconspicuous. The soredia are sparse to abundant and very fine, measuring 10–30 μm in diameter, with projecting hyphae that are usually present but short. Consoredia (aggregations of soredia) are present, measuring up to 60 μm. The species has two chemical variants: one containing fumarprotocetraric acid with minor amounts of protocetraric, succinprotocetraric and confumarprotocetraric acids, and another containing only fumarprotocetraric acid. Spot tests show K−, C−, KC−, and Pd+ (orange or red).

== Habitat and distribution ==
Lepraria friabilis has a disjunct distribution in the United States, occurring primarily in the Atlantic coastal plain and piedmont of the southeast, with isolated populations in southern California's peninsular ranges, specifically the Palomar and Cuyamaca Mountains. The species shows a strong habitat specificity, being confined to humid environments such as swamps, stream valleys, and sheltered north-facing slopes at higher elevations. It has a strict substrate preference, growing exclusively as an epiphyte on coniferous trees, particularly species of Pinus, Pseudotsuga, and Taxodium. Despite the presence of apparently suitable environmental conditions, the species has not been documented on either hardwood bark or rock substrates.
