= Lepraria neozelandica =

Scientific classification
- Kingdom: Fungi
- Division: Ascomycota
- Class: Lecanoromycetes
- Order: Lecanorales
- Family: Stereocaulaceae
- Genus: Lepraria
- Species: L. neozelandica

Binomial name
- Lepraria neozelandica Barcenas-Peña, Grewe & Lumbsch (2021)

Species of lichen-forming fungus

Lepraria neozelandica is a species of leprose lichen-forming fungus in the family Stereocaulaceae. It was formally described as a new species in 2021 by Alejandrina Barcenas-Peña, Rudy Grewe and H. Thorsten Lumbsch. The authors distinguished it from other Lepraria species that contain lecanoric acid by a combination of thallus form and chemistry, including a placodioid, finkii-type thallus and the absence of additional secondary metabolites beyond lecanoric acid. The type specimen was collected in New Zealand (Auckland, Birkdale neighborhood, Eskdale Bush Preserve) from bark in mixed broadleaf forest with tree ferns. The species epithet refers to its occurrence in New Zealand.

The body (thallus) is crust-forming (crustose) and powdery (leprose), with a rosette-like (placodioid) finkii-type organisation, and in some specimens the margins are slightly crinkled. It forms a continuous, distinctly two-layered crust that may begin as small separate patches that expand, overlap, and merge into a larger crust. The thallus is 1–1.4 mm thick and greenish-blue in colour. The fungal threads (hyphae) are colourless (hyaline), divided by cross-walls (septate), and about 2.4–2.5 μm wide. A basal mat (hypothallus) is variably developed, with densely intertwined hyphae surrounding and supporting the granules, and it may extend outward beyond the thallus edge. Root-like anchoring threads (rhizohyphae) are uncommon. The granules are roughly spherical (globose), about 25–35 μm in diameter, and described as fluffy. The algal partner (photobiont) is a green coccoid alga with rounded cells about 7.5–12.5 μm in diameter. The reported lichen product (secondary metabolite) is lecanoric acid.
