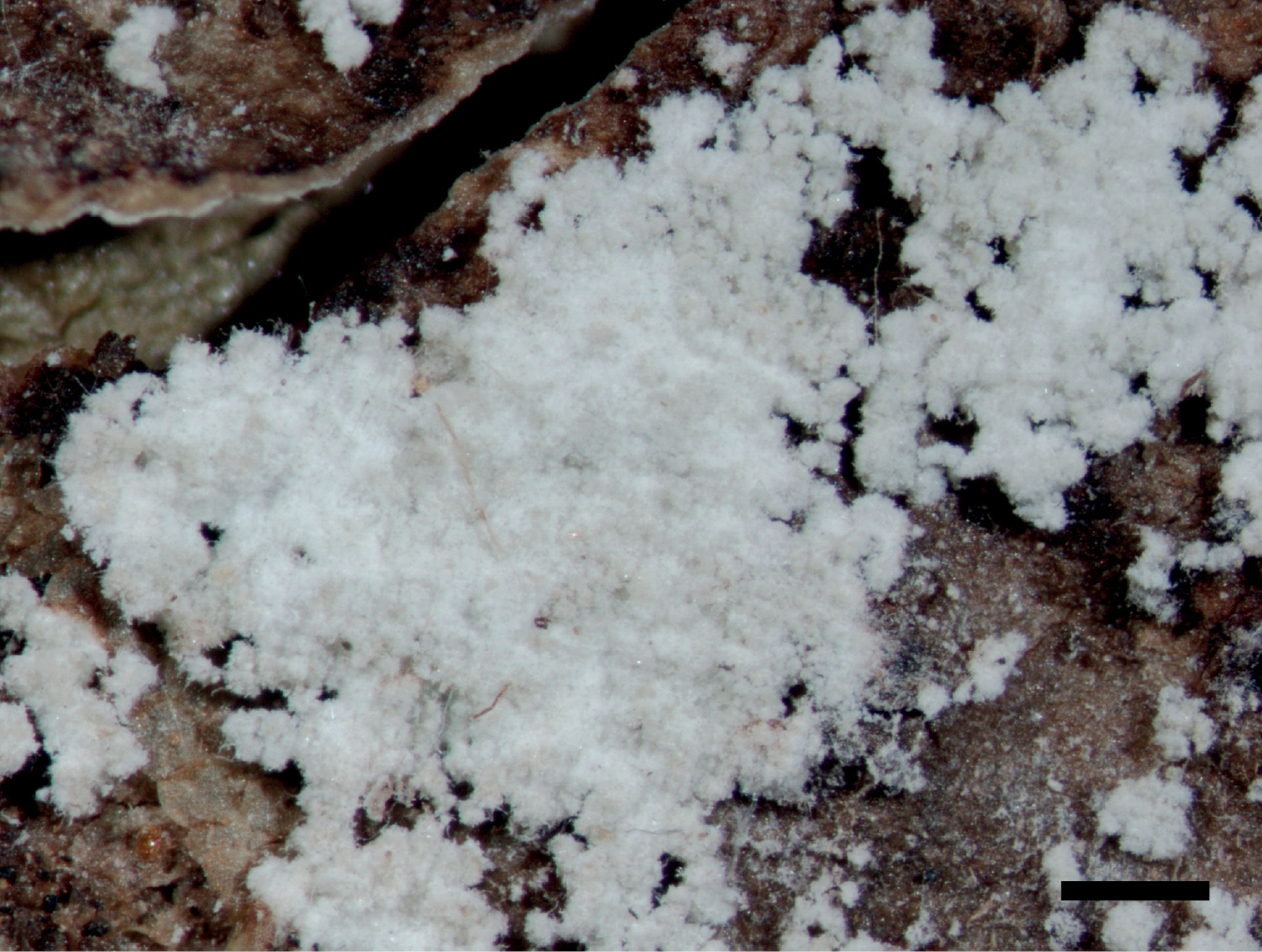
- Image of type specimen; scale bar: 0.5 mm

Scientific classification
- Kingdom: Fungi
- Division: Ascomycota
- Class: Lecanoromycetes
- Order: Lecanorales
- Family: Ramalinaceae
- Genus: Pseudolepraria; Kukwa, Jabłońska, Kosecka & Guzow-Krzem. (2023)
- Species: P. stephaniana

Binomial name
- Pseudolepraria stephaniana (Elix, Flakus & Kukwa) Kukwa, Jabłońska, Kosecka & Guzow-Krzem. (2023)

Synonyms
- Lepraria stephaniana Elix, Flakus & Kukwa (2010)

= Pseudolepraria =

Single-species lichen genus

Pseudolepraria is a fungal genus in the family Ramalinaceae. It comprises the single species Pseudolepraria stephaniana, a corticolous (bark-dwelling) leprose lichen found only in lowland tropical forests of Bolivia. First described as Lepraria stephaniana in 2010, the species was reclassified into its own genus in 2023 after molecular studies revealed its distinct phylogenetic position. The lichen is characterised by its thick, powdery, green-grey to creamy-white thallus lacking defined edges, and is notable for containing the rare compound 4-O-methylleprolomin. Unlike related Bolivian Lepraria species that occur at higher elevations, P. stephaniana is found only at altitudes between 300 and 470 metres above sea level in transitional zones between Chaco and Amazon rainforest types.

== Taxonomy ==
Pseudolepraria is a genus of lichen that contains only one species, Pseudolepraria stephaniana. The genus was established in 2023 by Martin Kukwa, Agnieszka Jabłońska, Magdalena Katarzyna Kosecka, and Beata Guzow-Krzemińska. The species was originally described as Lepraria stephaniana by John Elix, Adam Flakus, and Kukwa in 2010, but molecular studies revealed it belonged to a different family of fungi (Ramalinaceae) than other Lepraria species. While visually similar to Lepraria lichens, Pseudolepraria can be distinguished by its unique chemistry, particularly the presence of a rare compound called 4-O-methylleprolomin, which had previously only been found in one species of Pannaria lichen.

The genus name Pseudolepraria comes from combining "pseudo"- (false) with "Lepraria", referring to its superficial similarity to members of the genus Lepraria. Pseudolepraria stephaniana serves as the type species for the genus. The original type specimen (holotype) was collected near the villages of Ixiamas and Santa Rosa de Maravillas in Bolivia's La Paz Department on 28 July 2008.

== Description ==
Pseudolepraria stephaniana forms a thick, crusty growth (thallus) on tree bark that lacks defined edges or lobes. The thallus appears green-grey to creamy-white and has a soft, powdery texture. Under magnification, it can be seen to be composed of coarse, rounded granules up to 100–200 micrometres (μm) in diameter. These granules are made up of loosely arranged fungal threads (hyphae) mixed with green algal cells, with some fungal threads projecting outward up to 50 μm. Unlike some other lichens, Pseudolepraria lacks distinct layers in its structure, though older parts may show some stratification as the granules decay.

When tested with chemical spot test commonly used in lichen identification, the thallus turns yellow then reddish-brown when potassium hydroxide solution is applied (K+ yellow to red) and yellow when p-phenylenediamine is applied (P+ yellow). It contains several characteristic substances including 4-O-methylleprolomin as its main compound, along with smaller amounts of salazinic acid, zeorin, and an unidentified terpenoid.

== Habitat and distribution ==
Pseudolepraria stephaniana is known only from three locations in Bolivia, where it grows on tree bark in lowland tropical forests. Unlike many related lichens that prefer higher elevations, this species has only been found at relatively low altitudes between 300 and 470 metres above sea level. It occurs specifically in transition zones between Chaco and Amazon forest types and in pre-Andean Amazon forest environments. This habitat preference distinguishes it from similar-looking Lepraria species in Bolivia, which typically occur above 1000 metres elevation in montane forests and high Andean vegetation.
