= Lepraria lanata =

Conservation status
- Endangered (IUCN 3.1)

Scientific classification
- Kingdom: Fungi
- Division: Ascomycota
- Class: Lecanoromycetes
- Order: Lecanorales
- Family: Stereocaulaceae
- Genus: Lepraria
- Species: L. lanata

Binomial name
- Lepraria lanata Tønsberg (2007)
- Holotype: Great Smoky Mountains National Park, Tennessee

Species of lichen

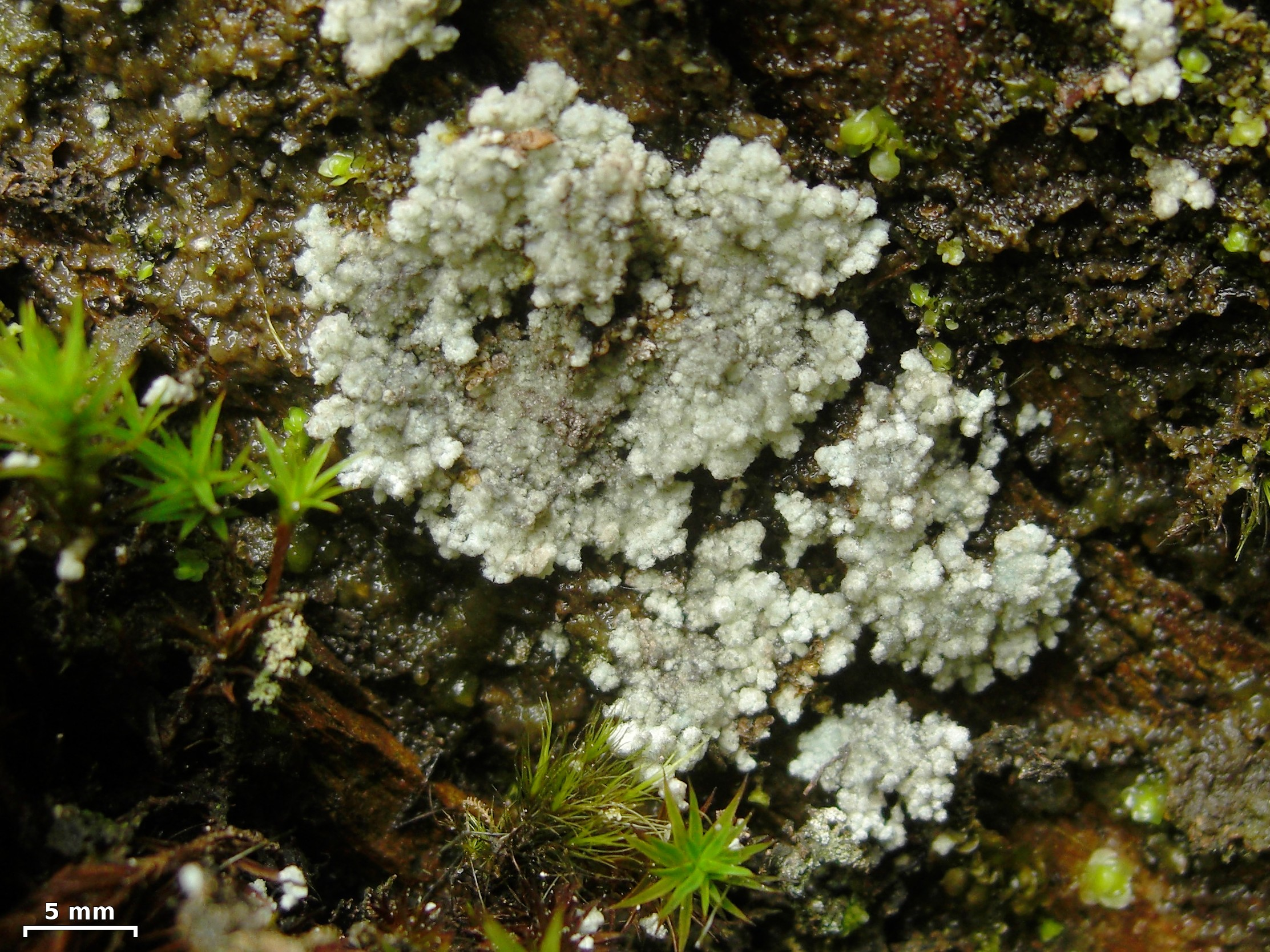
Lepraria lanata on Mount Leconte, Tennessee, USA

Lepraria lanata is a species of leprose lichen in the family Stereocaulaceae. It occurs in the eastern United States, where it grows most on rock surfaces, and occasionally on soil or mosses.

== Taxonomy ==
Lepraria lanata was described by the Norwegian lichenologist Tor Tønsberg in 2007, with the type specimen collected from a schistose rock wall in the Great Smoky Mountains National Park (Tennessee). The species epithet lanata, from the Latin word for "woolly", refers to the appearance of the consoredia, which resemble balls of wool. In their 2020 field guide to the lichens of the Great Smoky Mountains National Park, the authors introduced the vernacular name "Appalachian pillows" for the species, and called it "a special treasure of the Southern Appalachians and something to keep eyes wide open for".

== Description ==
This species is distinguished by its unique woolly appearance, where all soredia (reproductive propagules) are aggregated into distinctive clusters called consoredia, reaching up to 1 mm in size. These consoredia are surrounded by a characteristic loose network of branching and interconnecting fungal threads (hyphae), which, while forming an extensive mesh, typically do not project outward. The hyphae may be colourless or develop brown pigmentation in their outer portions. The thallus (lichen body) has a diffuse margin without lobes and lacks a medulla (inner layer). The color of the thallus ranges from whitish to more or less brownish to bluish-gray. Spot tests are K+ (yellow), C−, KC−, P−, and UV−.

== Habitat and distribution ==
The species occurs primarily on rock surfaces, with occasional records from soil or mosses. It can be found in both dry and somewhat wet overhanging areas and rock walls. Lepraria lanata is known only from montane regions of eastern United States, at elevations ranging from 1,120 to 1,990 m (3,670 to 6,530 ft).
