= Lepraria lobata =

Scientific classification
- Kingdom: Fungi
- Division: Ascomycota
- Class: Lecanoromycetes
- Order: Lecanorales
- Family: Stereocaulaceae
- Genus: Lepraria
- Species: L. lobata

Binomial name
- Lepraria lobata Elix & Kalb (2006)
- Holotype: Porongurup National Park, Western Australia

Species of lichen

Lepraria lobata is a species of leprose lichen in the family Stereocaulaceae. It is found in Australia, where it grows on bark, mosses on rock, and soil.

== Taxonomy ==
Lepraria lobata was described by the lichenologists John Alan Elix and Klaus Kalb in 2006. The type specimen was collected by Elix in Porongurup National Park, Western Australia, at an elevation of 360 m (1,180 ft). There, on the slopes on Angwin Peak, the lichen was found growing on granite rocks in a sclerophyll forest. The species epithet lobata alludes to the characteristic lobate shape of the thallus margins.

== Description ==
The species forms a granular, partially membranous thallus (lichen body) with a typically well-defined margin. It develops distinctive lobes that are often well-defined, measuring 1–2 mm wide, with slightly to distinctly raised margins. The colour of the thallus ranges from whitish grey to greenish-grey to bluish-grey. The thallus has a distinct white medulla (inner layer) but lacks a hypothallus (attachment layer). In some areas, only sparse soredia may be present, exposing the medulla. The reproductive structures consist of scattered to abundant fine soredia (20–75 μm in diameter), which usually have short projecting hyphae. These soredia commonly form larger clusters called consoredia, reaching up to 350 μm across. The species can be identified by its characteristic chemical composition, which includes atranorin, zeorin, and various fatty acids.

== Habitat and distribution ==
This lichen grows on bark, mosses on rock, and soil substrates, typically in sheltered locations. It is known to occur only in Australia. In addition to its type locality in western Australia, it has also been recorded in the Australian Capital Territory.
