= Lepraria ulrikii =

Scientific classification
- Kingdom: Fungi
- Division: Ascomycota
- Class: Lecanoromycetes
- Order: Lecanorales
- Family: Stereocaulaceae
- Genus: Lepraria
- Species: L. ulrikii

Binomial name
- Lepraria ulrikii Grewe, Barcenas-Peña, R.Diaz & Lumbsch (2021)

Species of lichen-forming fungus

Lepraria ulrikii is a species of leprose lichen-forming fungus in the family Stereocaulaceae. This powdery lichen occurs in Australia and New Zealand, where it grows on bark and tree ferns.

== Taxonomy ==
Lepraria ulrikii was described as a new species in 2021 by Felix Grewe, Alejandrina Bárcenas-Peña, Rudy Díaz and H. Thorsten Lumbsch. The species epithet honours the lichenologist Ulrik Søchting. The authors noted that it is morphologically and chemically very similar to Lepraria finkii, but treated it as distinct based on phylogenetic evidence and differences in chemistry and geographic range.

== Description ==
The body (thallus) is crust-forming (crustose) and powdery (leprose), with a rosette-like (placodioid) finkii-type form, about 0.1–0.3 mm thick and greenish in colour. The fungal threads (hyphae) are colourless (hyaline), divided by cross-walls (septate), and about 2.5–5 μm wide, with a variably developed basal mat (hypothallus). Root-like anchoring threads (rhizohyphae) are uncommon, and the granules are spherical (globose), fluffy, and about 27.5–40 μm across. The algal partner (photobiont) is a green, coccoid alga with rounded cells about 7.5–15 (sometimes up to 20) μm in diameter. Reported lichen products (secondary metabolites) include atranorin, zeorin, stictic acid, and trace amounts of constictic acid

== Habitat and distribution ==
The species has been reported from Australasia, including New Zealand, mainland Australia, and Tasmania. The type collection was made in the Auckland region (Eskdale Bush Preserve, Birkdale) at about 25 m elevation, where it was found on a tree fern in mixed broadleaf forest. Other collections from the same locality have been recorded on bark and tree ferns.
