= Lepraria santosii =

Scientific classification
- Domain: Eukaryota
- Kingdom: Fungi
- Division: Ascomycota
- Class: Lecanoromycetes
- Order: Lecanorales
- Family: Stereocaulaceae
- Genus: Lepraria
- Species: L. santosii

Binomial name
- Lepraria santosii Argüello & A.Crespo (2006)

Species of lichen

Lepraria santosii is a species of crustose lichen in the family Stereocaulaceae. It occurs in Tenerife, in the Canary Islands.

== Taxonomy ==
It was formally described as a new species in 2006 by Arturo Argüello and Ana Crespo. The type specimen was collected at a road cutting in Las Mercedes (Tenerife) at an elevation of 850 m (2,790 ft). Here, on a shaded, north-facing slope, it was found growing on the soil over basaltic rocks. The specific epithet honours Canarian botanist Arnaldo Santos of the Botanical Garden of Puerto de la Cruz in Tenerife.

== description ==
The thallus of Lepraria santosii ranges in form from crustose (crust-like) to somewhat squamulose (scaly) to leprose (powdery or granular). Measuring about 0.2 mm thick, its colour is whitish grey to greenish grey. The granules comprising the thallus are round and 20–100 μm in diameter; they are surrounded by colourless, branching, projecting hyphae. The lichen does not have a medulla. The photobiont partner is a single-celled green alga whose cells measure about 10–16 μm in diameter and sometimes clump together. Lepraria santosii contains several lichen products: atranorin, roccellic acid, stictic acid, and zeorin. Lepraria xerophila is similar in appearance but has a different chemistry.
