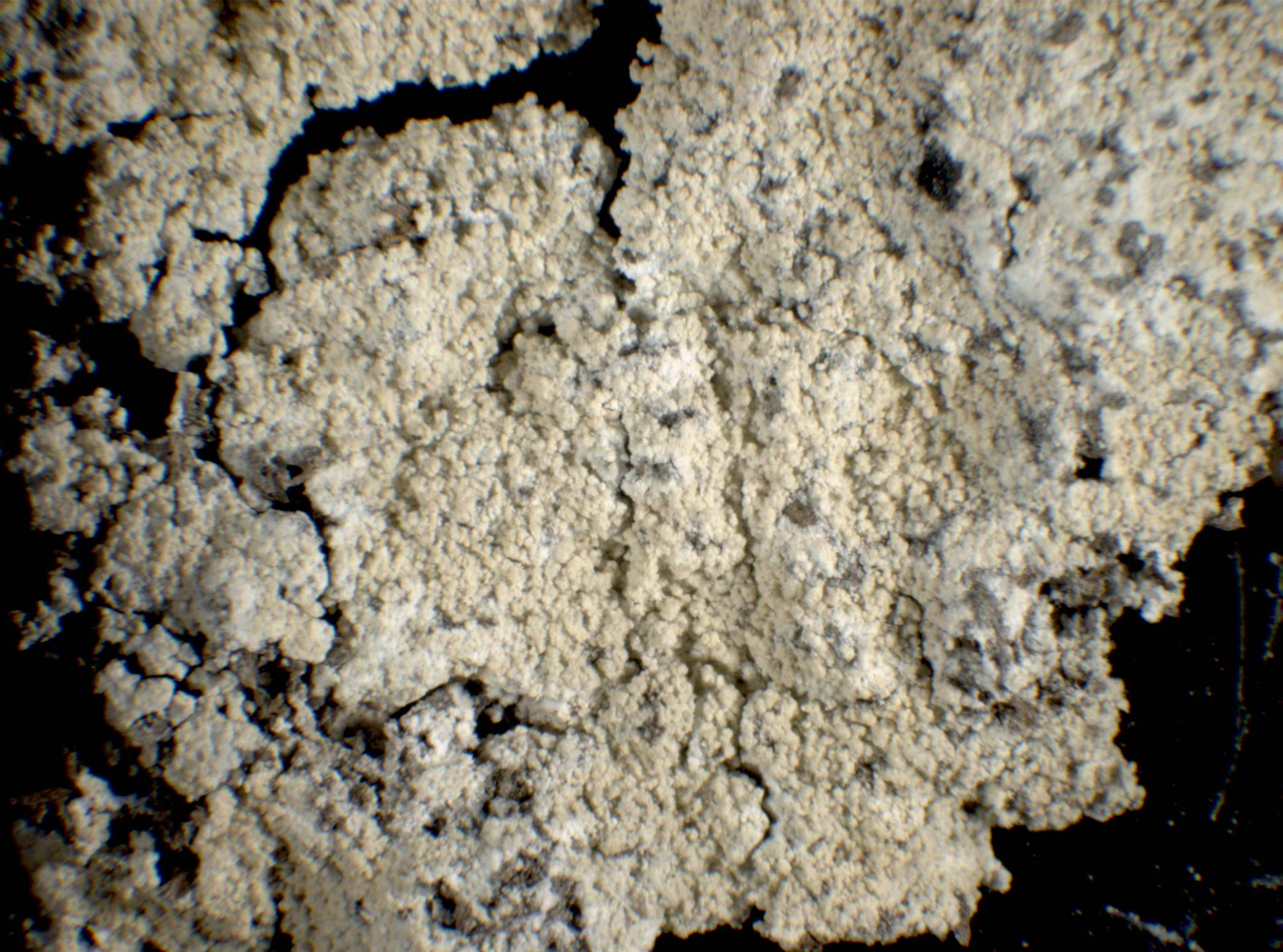

Scientific classification
- Domain: Eukaryota
- Kingdom: Fungi
- Division: Ascomycota
- Class: Lecanoromycetes
- Order: Lecanorales
- Family: Stereocaulaceae
- Genus: Lepraria
- Species: L. diffusa

Binomial name
- Lepraria diffusa (J.R.Laundon) Kukwa (2002)

Synonyms
- Leproloma diffusum J.R.Laundon (1989); Leproloma diffusum var. chrysodetoides J.R.Laundon (1989); Lepraria diffusa var. chrysodetoides (J.R.Laundon) Kukwa (2002)

= Lepraria diffusa =

Species of lichen

Lepraria diffusa is a species of leprose lichen in the family Stereocaulaceae. Originally described as Leproloma diffusum by Jack Laundon in 1989, it was reclassified into Lepraria in 2002. The lichen has a powdery thallus containing the secondary metabolite 4-oxypannaric acid 2-methylester. It grows on calcareous rocks and mosses in shaded areas across Asia, Europe, North America, and South America.

== Taxonomy ==
Lepraria diffusa was originally described by Jack Laundon in 1989 as Leproloma diffusum, based on a type specimen collected in Finland. He also proposed a variety, var. chrysodetoides, due to the presence of an unidentified pigment in the thallus. In 2002, Martin Kukwa transferred the species to Lepraria, and in 2006, he synonymized var. chrysodetoides with the nominate variety. He determined that the colour differences resulted from varying levels of 4-oxypannaric acid 2-methylester, influenced by environmental factors like sunlight. Chemical analyses showed no distinct taxonomic traits, and intermediate specimens suggested continuous variation, leading to the recognition of a single taxon.

== Description ==
Lepraria diffusa is a leprose lichen forming a powdery to cottony thallus. The margin of the thallus is diffuse to delimited, without lobes. The medulla is usually present, thick and white in colour. A whitish grey to brownish hypothallus is sometimes present but weakly developed. The thallus contains abundant coarse soredia measuring up to 100 micrometres in diameter, with projecting hyphae sometimes present and short in length. The diagnostic secondary metabolite is 4-oxypannaric acid 2-methylester, with additional minor compounds including 4-oxypannaric acid, pannaric acid methylester, pannaric acid 2-methylester, pannaric acid and other dibenzofurans in trace amounts. Chemical spot tests show K− or K+ (yellow slowly becoming orange), C− or C+ (yellow), KC− or KC+ (yellow), and Pd+ (reddish orange).

== Habitat and distribution ==
This species grows on calcareous rock, often colonising mosses growing on the rock surface. It can rarely also be found on bark or soil. It typically occurs in shaded and sheltered locations. The species occurs in Asia, Europe, and North America. It was reported from the Southern Hemisphere for the first time in 2011, from Bolivia, Chile, Ecuador and Peru. On this continent it grows on soil in the Andes, mainly in cloud forests and páramo vegetation.
