= Lepraria atlantica =

Scientific classification
- Domain: Eukaryota
- Kingdom: Fungi
- Division: Ascomycota
- Class: Lecanoromycetes
- Order: Lecanorales
- Family: Stereocaulaceae
- Genus: Lepraria
- Species: L. atlantica

Binomial name
- Lepraria atlantica Orange (2001)

Species of lichen

Lepraria atlantica is a species of leprose lichen in the family Stereocaulaceae. Described as a new species in 2001, the lichen occurs in Australia, Europe, and Greenland, where it typically grows over rocks and associated mosses.

== Taxonomy ==
The species was described as new to science by the lichenologist Alan Orange in 2001. The type specimen was collected in Ireland, in West Donegal, southeast of Glenties along the Owenbhan River, at an elevation of 80 metres. The specimen was found on a shaded, damp rock face beside a wooded stream, growing alongside Diplophyllum albicans.

== Description ==
Like most members of its genus, this lichen forms a powdery to cottony crust that lacks distinct edges or lobes. There is no true medulla, but the lichen has a patchy base layer (hypothallus) consisting of sparse hyphae that range from white to dull orange in colour. The reproductive structures consist of abundant fine powder-like granules (soredia) measuring 40–100 μm in diameter, occasionally reaching 160–220 μm. Short projecting threads (hyphae) are rarely present on these granules, and larger clusters of soredia (consoredia) are uncommon.

Two main chemical variants are known: one containing atranorin, porphyrilic acid and rangiformic acid; the other containing atranorin, porphyrilic acid and roccellic/angardianic acid. Less common variants may have porphyrilic acid alone or both types of fatty acids together with atranorin and porphyrilic acid. The base layer typically produces unidentified anthraquinone compounds. The expected results for standard chemical spot tests are K+ (yellow), C−, Pd− or + (yellow).

== Habitat and distribution ==
Lepraria atlantica grows on siliceous rock and the mosses that grow over it. It is sometimes found on soil and rarely on bark. The species typically occurs in locations sheltered from rain. It has been recorded from Europe, Australia, and Greenland.
