= Lauri Saag =

Estonian geneticist (born 1977)

Lauri Saag (born 26 May 1977) is an Estonian geneticist, mycologist and lichenologist. As of 2023, he is associate professor of population genetics at the Estonian Biocentre.

== Career ==
Saag studied botany, ecology and mycology at the University of Tartu between 1995 and 2002. He wrote his master's thesis on soredial crustose lichens in Estonia. From 2002 to 2008, he also did his doctorate there on taxonomic and ecological problems of the lichen genus Lepraria, and later continued working at the university as a research assistant. Saag also carries out human population genetics research, and has been a member of the Estonian Society of Human Genetics since 2015.

He has described the following taxon:

- Lepraria caesioalba var. groenlandica L.Saag, 2007
