= Lepraria eburnea =

Scientific classification
- Kingdom: Fungi
- Division: Ascomycota
- Class: Lecanoromycetes
- Order: Lecanorales
- Family: Stereocaulaceae
- Genus: Lepraria
- Species: L. eburnea

Binomial name
- Lepraria eburnea J.R.Laundon (1992)

Synonyms
- Lepraria frigida J.R.Laundon (1992)

Species of lichen

Lepraria eburnea is a widespread species of leprose lichen in the family Stereocaulaceae. It forms a powdery to cottony thallus that lacks clear boundaries and contains alectorialic acid as its main secondary metabolite. It grows on various substrates including rock, bark, and soil, showing a particular preference for calcareous materials in some regions. The lichen is found across Europe, North America, Australasia, and Greenland, occurring from sea level to alpine elevations, and is typically found in areas with high humidity. In North America, it is particularly abundant in the Great Lakes region and Maritime provinces of Canada, where it commonly grows as an epiphyte on tree bases in swampy areas.

== Taxonomy ==
Lepraria eburnea was described by the lichenologist Jack Laundon in 1992. The holotype was collected by Laundon on 30 June 1987 in the All Saints Fulham churchyard, located in the London Borough of Hammersmith and Fulham, Middlesex, England. It was found growing in slight shade on moss, brick, and mortar on the vertical surface of a brick wall. The specimen, designated Laundon 3185, is deposited at the herbarium of the British Museum (BM).

Lepraria frigida, described by Laundon in the same publication, was later considered synonymous with L. eburnea. Research has shown that while the species exhibits chemical variation, these variants are morphologically indistinguishable. The discovery of previously unreported chemical compounds in the holotype of L. frigida provided additional evidence supporting the merger of these two taxa.

== Description ==
Lepraria eburnea forms a leprose thallus that is powdery to cottony in texture. The margin is typically diffuse (lacking clear boundaries), and lobes are usually absent. The medulla is usually present and thick, appearing white. The hypothallus is usually not distinct or visible. The thallus surface sometimes lacks soredia in patches, with these soredia often embedded in a hyphal weft. The soredia are abundant and mostly fine, measuring up to 60 micrometres (μm) in diameter, with projecting hyphae usually present ranging from short to long (up to 100 μm). Consoredia (aggregations of soredia) are present and can measure up to 200–400 μm. The species is characterised chemically by containing alectorialic acid, with three main chemical variants: one with alectorialic and protocetraric acids, another with alectorialic and psoromic acids (with 2'-O-demethylpsoromic acid in trace amounts), and a third containing only alectorialic acid. Chemical spot tests show K− or K+ (yellow), C− or C+ (reddish orange), KC+ (pink or reddish orange), and Pd+ (lemon yellow or orange).

== Habitat and distribution ==
The species shows no particular substrate preference, being found on mosses, bark, wood, rock, soil and lichens. It occurs in Europe, North America, Australasia, and Greenland. The species has been recorded from both shaded and exposed locations, typically in areas with high humidity.

In the British Isles, the species shows a preference for calcareous substrates, occurring on limestone, slightly calcareous sandstone, mudstone, and mica-schist, as well as artificial surfaces such as brick walls. It is particularly abundant on Old Red Sandstone cliffs in the Brecon Beacons. While primarily lithophytic, there are occasional records from dead bark. The species has been documented at various elevations, from near sea level to approximately 750 m (2,460 ft) in Britain, and up to 2,300 m (7,500 ft) in the Austrian Alps. Environmental conditions significantly influence its appearance, with specimens in more exposed locations typically displaying more clearly defined margins and paler colouration compared to those in sheltered positions.

Lepraria eburnea is widely distributed across northern North America, being particularly abundant in the Great Lakes region and Maritime provinces of Canada. In these regions, it is frequently found growing as an epiphyte at tree bases in swampy areas, showing a particular preference for Thuja species. While absent from the central and southern Appalachian Mountains, the species occurs sporadically throughout the central and southwestern United States, where it typically grows on shaded soil, especially along road cuts. The species is also present in the Pacific Northwest, with isolated populations occurring southward in various mountain ranges of western North America.
