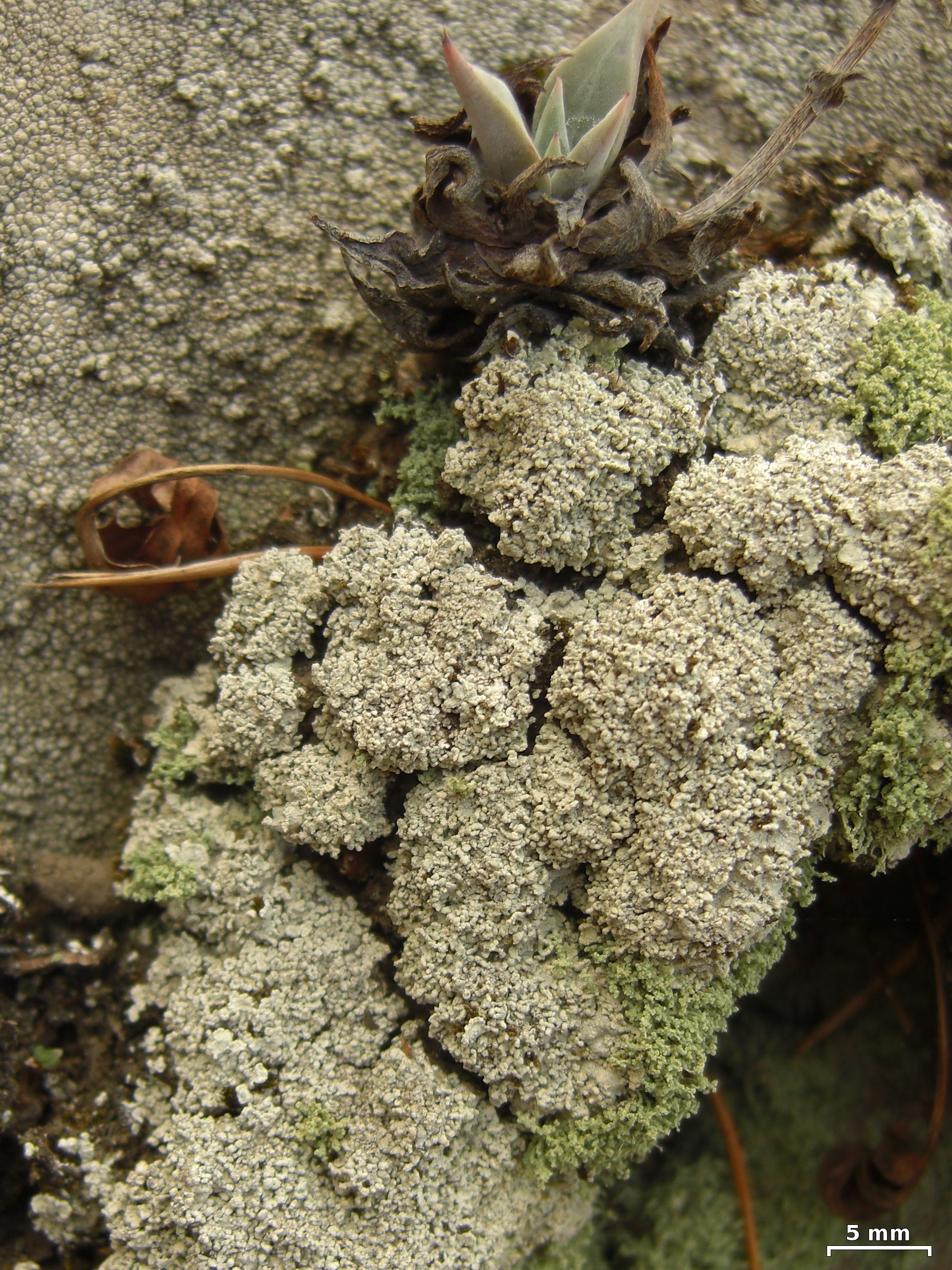

Scientific classification
- Kingdom: Fungi
- Division: Ascomycota
- Class: Lecanoromycetes
- Order: Lecanorales
- Family: Stereocaulaceae
- Genus: Lepraria
- Species: L. xerophila

Binomial name
- Lepraria xerophila Tønsberg (2004)

= Lepraria xerophila =

Species of lichen

Lepraria xerophila is a species of leprose lichen in the family Stereocaulaceae. Found in Europe and northwestern North America, it was formally described as a new species in 2004 by the Norwegian lichenologist Tor Tønsberg.

== Description ==
Lepraria xerophila has a thallus that is highly variable, usually crustose (crust-like) and rarely squamulose (scaly). It forms compact, defined rosettes up to 2 cm (13/16 in) in diameter, with marginal lobes that are 2 to 3 millimeters (mm) wide and about 0.3 mm thick, having rounded tips and a distinctly raised margin up to 0.5 mm thick. These rosettes often merge with other neighbouring thalli to create a coarse, irregularly spreading, nearly continuous crust that can extend up to a decimeter or more in width.

The upper surface of the thallus ranges from whitish-gray to pale yellowish-gray, with a texture that varies from smooth to rough. It supports numerous fragile lobules (small lobes) that can be horizontal to vertical, regular to irregular, and easily detached. These lobules act as diaspores (reproductive structures) and evolve partly by budding off from the lobe margins, partly from the upper surface, and possibly from disintegrating lobes. Soredia (powdery reproductive structures) are few or absent.

In thick specimens, the medulla (inner layer) is distinct and white. The photobiont (photosynthetic partner) is organized in roughly spherical groups, 24–50 μm in diameter, within the diaspores and forms a nearly continuous layer just beneath the thallus surface. The lower surface is whitish-gray and lacks a tomentum (a covering of fine hairs).

Spot tests on this lichen yield the following results: K−, C−, KC−, and P+. The secondary metabolites present in Lepraria xerophila vary by chemotype. Chemotype I (most specimens) contains minor atranorin, major pannaric acid 6-methyl ester, usually major roccellic or rangiformic acids, and possibly trace amounts of methyl porphyrilate, pannaric, and porphyrilic acids. Chemotype II contains major norstictic acid, minor strepsilin, minor isostrepsilin acid, minor atranorin, and minor chloroatranorin.

== Habitat and distribution ==
Lepraria xerophila typically grows on dry soil, though it is occasionally found on bare rock and on wood. It thrives in various habitats including grasslands, coastal scrubland, chaparral, and areas transitioning to desert. It is also present in mixed oak-chaparral-pasture regions and oak forests.

Geographically, this lichen is found in Europe, where only chemotype I is present. In North America, it is distributed along the Pacific coast, from Mexico up to Marin County, California.
