= Lepraria crassissima =

Scientific classification
- Kingdom: Fungi
- Division: Ascomycota
- Class: Lecanoromycetes
- Order: Lecanorales
- Family: Stereocaulaceae
- Genus: Lepraria
- Species: L. crassissima

Binomial name
- Lepraria crassissima (Hue) Lettau (1958)

Synonyms
- Crocynia crassissima Hue (1924)

Species of lichen

Lepraria crassissima is a species of leprose lichen in the family Stereocaulaceae. It occurs in Australia and Europe, where it grows on rocks and on mosses growing on rocks.

== Taxonomy ==
The species was first described as Crocynia crassissima by Auguste-Marie Hue in 1924, and was later transferred to Lepraria by Georg Lettau in 1958. The type specimen was collected in France, with an isotype housed in the herbarium of the Berlin Botanical Garden and Botanical Museum (B).

== Description ==
This lichen forms a membranous to cottony crust with edges that are usually clearly defined. While lobes may sometimes be present, they are poorly defined. It has a distinctive very thick white medulla, and its lower surface is distinct and folded, varying from smooth to woolly in texture, and white to brownish in colour. Older specimens often show eroded patches where the medulla is exposed. The reproductive structures consist of abundant coarse granules (soredia) up to 300–400 micrometres in diameter, with projecting threads (hyphae) that can be short to long. Well-developed specimens may develop large granules or warts that somewhat resemble isidia but lack a cortex, and these may become sorediate.

The species contains divaricatic acid, nordivaricatic acid (usually major, rarely trace amounts), and zeorin (major to minor amounts). Chemical spot test results are K−, C+ (rose-red), KC−, and Pd−.

== Habitat and distribution ==
Lepraria crassissima grows on siliceous rock and epilithic mosses, and sometimes occurs on bark or calcareous rock. It is found in shaded, humid environments. The species has been recorded from Europe and Australia.
