= Lepraria goughensis =

Scientific classification
- Domain: Eukaryota
- Kingdom: Fungi
- Division: Ascomycota
- Class: Lecanoromycetes
- Order: Lecanorales
- Family: Stereocaulaceae
- Genus: Lepraria
- Species: L. goughensis

Binomial name
- Lepraria goughensis Elix & Øvstedal (2005)

Species of lichen

Lepraria goughensis is a little-known species of leprose lichen in the family Stereocaulaceae. It is only known to occur on Gough Island in the south Atlantic Ocean.

== Taxonomy ==
Lepraria goughensis was described by the lichenologists John Elix and Dag Øvstedal in 2005. The type specimen was collected on Seal Beach. The species epithet refers to Gough Island, part of the Tristan da Cunha group of islands in the south Atlantic.

== Description ==
Lepraria goughensis forms a leprose, powdery, greyish-green thallus. The margin is delimited, with usually poorly defined lobes present. The overall shape is that of a rosette, generally measuring 1–4 cm wide. The medulla and hypothallus are both absent. The soredia are abundant and very fine, measuring 20–26 micrometres in diameter, with numerous projecting hyphae present. The species contains lecanoric acid, with minor to trace amounts of gyrophoric acid and strepsilin, and trace amounts of fragilin, 7-chloroemodin, and flavo-obscurin C. Spot tests show K−, C+ (red), KC+ (red), and Pd−. Its combination of secondary metabolites is unique in the genus Lepraria.

== Habitat and distribution ==
This species grows on mosses and plant litter, as well as peat. It occurs in shady, humid places and is known only from Gough Island in the South Atlantic Ocean.
