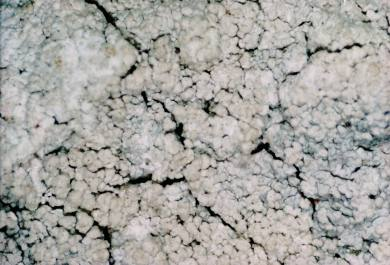
- Lepraria lobificans

Scientific classification
- Kingdom: Fungi
- Division: Ascomycota
- Class: Lecanoromycetes
- Order: Lecanorales
- Family: Stereocaulaceae
- Genus: Lepraria; Ach. (1803)

Type species
- Lepraria incana (L.) Ach. (1803)

Synonyms
- Pulina Adans. (1763); Conia Vent. (1799); Epinyctis Wallr. (1831); Amphiloma Nyl. (1855); Leproloma Nyl. (1883); Leproloma Nyl. ex Cromb. (1894)

= Lepraria =

Genus of lichen-forming fungi

Lepraria is a genus of leprose (powdery) crustose lichens that grows on its substrate like patches of granular, caked up, mealy dust grains. Members of the genus are commonly called dust lichens. The main vegetative body (thallus) is made of patches of soredia (little balls of algae wrapped in fungus). Sexual structures have not been observed in Lepraria, but genomic evidence indicates that the genus retains mating type and meiosis-associated genes, raising the possibility of parasexual recombination. Some species can form marginal lobes and appear squamulose. Because of the morphological simplicity of the thallus and the absence of sexual structures, the composition of lichen products (i.e., secondary metabolites made by lichens) are important characters to distinguish between similar species in Lepraria.

== Taxonomy ==
Lepraria was circumscribed in 1803 by Swedish lichenologist Erik Acharius. Jack Laundon assigned Lepraria incana as the type species of the genus in 1992. It is in the family Stereocaulaceae.

The taxonomy of Lepraria has undergone significant changes as new research methods have become available. Historically, some species now classified as Lepraria were placed in a separate genus called Leproloma, which was thought to be distinct based on features such as whitish colouring with yellow tints, a powdery surface composed of small lobes, and specific chemical compounds called dibenzofurans. However, molecular studies in 2002 showed that most species from both genera are actually part of the same evolutionary group.

Scientists use multiple characteristics to identify and classify Lepraria species, including their physical appearance (morphology), their chemical composition, and their genetic sequences. Different populations of the same species can have varying chemical compositions, known as chemotypes. This variation has led to debate among researchers about how to properly define species boundaries within the genus. While some researchers have proposed splitting the genus into many narrowly defined species based on small genetic or chemical differences, others advocate for a more conservative approach that considers multiple lines of evidence. Because the leprose ("leprarioid") thallus has arisen independently in multiple unrelated lichen lineages, morphology alone can sometimes place superficially similar species together even when they are not closely related. One example is "Lepraria stephaniana", which molecular data showed to be unrelated to Lepraria in the strict sense, and instead nested within the Ramalinaceae; it was therefore transferred in 2023 to the new genus Pseudolepraria as Pseudolepraria stephaniana.

== Description ==
Species of Lepraria are characterised by their powdery, crustose thalli, which are composed almost entirely of soredia—small, granular clusters of fungal and algal cells that allow for asexual reproduction. The thallus may appear loosely attached or more firmly integrated with the substrate, forming irregular, diffuse patches or well-defined, lobed margins. Most species exhibit shades of grey, greenish-grey, or cream, lacking the bright pigmentation seen in some other lichens.

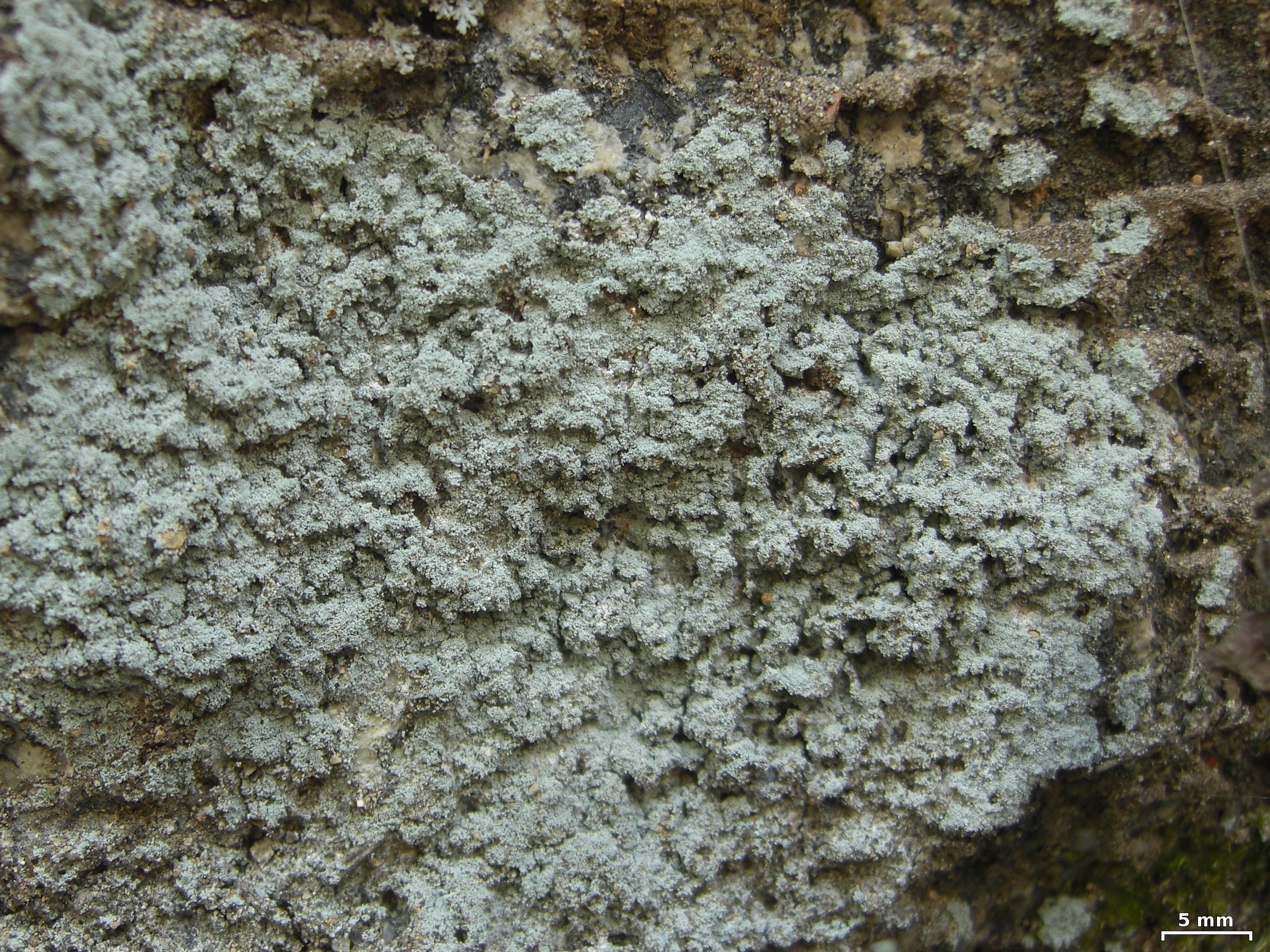
Lepraria neglecta

Unlike many lichen-forming fungi, Lepraria species have not been observed producing fruiting bodies (apothecia) or sexual spores (ascospores). Instead, they are thought to spread mainly by soredia. In some species, soredia clump into larger clusters (consoredia), which can make the thallus look rough or grainy. In wetter or more sheltered habitats, some species may look cottony or form a thin, membrane-like layer. The thallus may also include a basal hypothallus—a mat of fungal hyphae—whose colour can range from white to dark brown or black. Genomic work on Lepraria neglecta suggests that "asexual" in this genus mainly means "no sexual structures observed". Although Lepraria has not been seen forming sexual structures and is often treated as clonal, a chromosome-scale genome assembly of L. neglecta identified a mating-type locus (MAT), including conserved MAT1-2 genes and a putative MAT1-1 pseudogene. Later comparisons across multiple Lepraria species found intact mating-type loci present as single copies. Both MAT1-1 and MAT1-2 idiomorphs (alternative, non-homologous DNA sequences found at the same mating-type locus) occur in the genus, consistent with a heterothallic system. The same work recovered 29 genes related to meiosis and mitosis and 45 genes related to the development of fungal sexual structures. It suggested that Lepraria may undergo cryptic recombination (genetic mixing that leaves no obvious sexual structures) even though sexual reproduction has not been observed in over 200 years of lichenological study. One proposed explanation is a parasexual cycle, in which recombination occurs without visible fruiting bodies.

The genus Lepraria is chemically diverse, with species producing a wide range of secondary metabolites, including depsides, depsidones, aliphatic acids, and terpenoids. These substances, detectable through thin-layer chromatography, are often the primary basis for distinguishing species. Many species grow in humid, shaded environments such as tree bark, moss-covered rocks, and soil, although some are found in more exposed, dry habitats.

Molecular phylogenetics studies have refined the circumscription of Lepraria. Several species formerly included in the genus, including those producing usnic acid, have been reassigned to other lineages, including Leprocaulon. This reclassification has clarified Lepraria as a lineage most closely related to Stereocaulon, within the family Stereocaulaceae.

== Habitat, distribution, and ecology ==
Lepraria species occupy a wide range of habitats but are most commonly found in shaded, humid environments where direct rainfall is limited. Many species grow on tree bark, moss-covered rocks, or decaying wood, particularly in forests with stable humidity levels. Some taxa prefer rocky substrates, particularly siliceous or calcareous surfaces, and can colonise cracks or overhangs where they are partially sheltered. Other species thrive on soil, mosses, or plant debris, often in montane or subalpine environments.

While Lepraria is often associated with moist microhabitats, certain species tolerate or even prefer more exposed conditions, such as sunlit rock faces or dry forest floors. Some species are pioneers in disturbed habitats, rapidly colonising exposed surfaces where competition from other lichens or plants is low. In contrast, others show a preference for mature forests with stable microclimates, particularly in temperate regions.

The genus has a broad geographical distribution, occurring on every continent, including Antarctica. The highest species diversity is found in temperate zones, but representatives of Lepraria are also common in tropical and boreal forests, alpine regions, and oceanic islands. Some species exhibit narrow ecological preferences and are restricted to specific regions or substrate types, while others are cosmopolitan in their distribution. In 2011, 27 species were reported to occur in South America.

== Species ==
As of October 2026, Species Fungorum (in the Catalogue of Life) accepts 85 species of Lepraria.

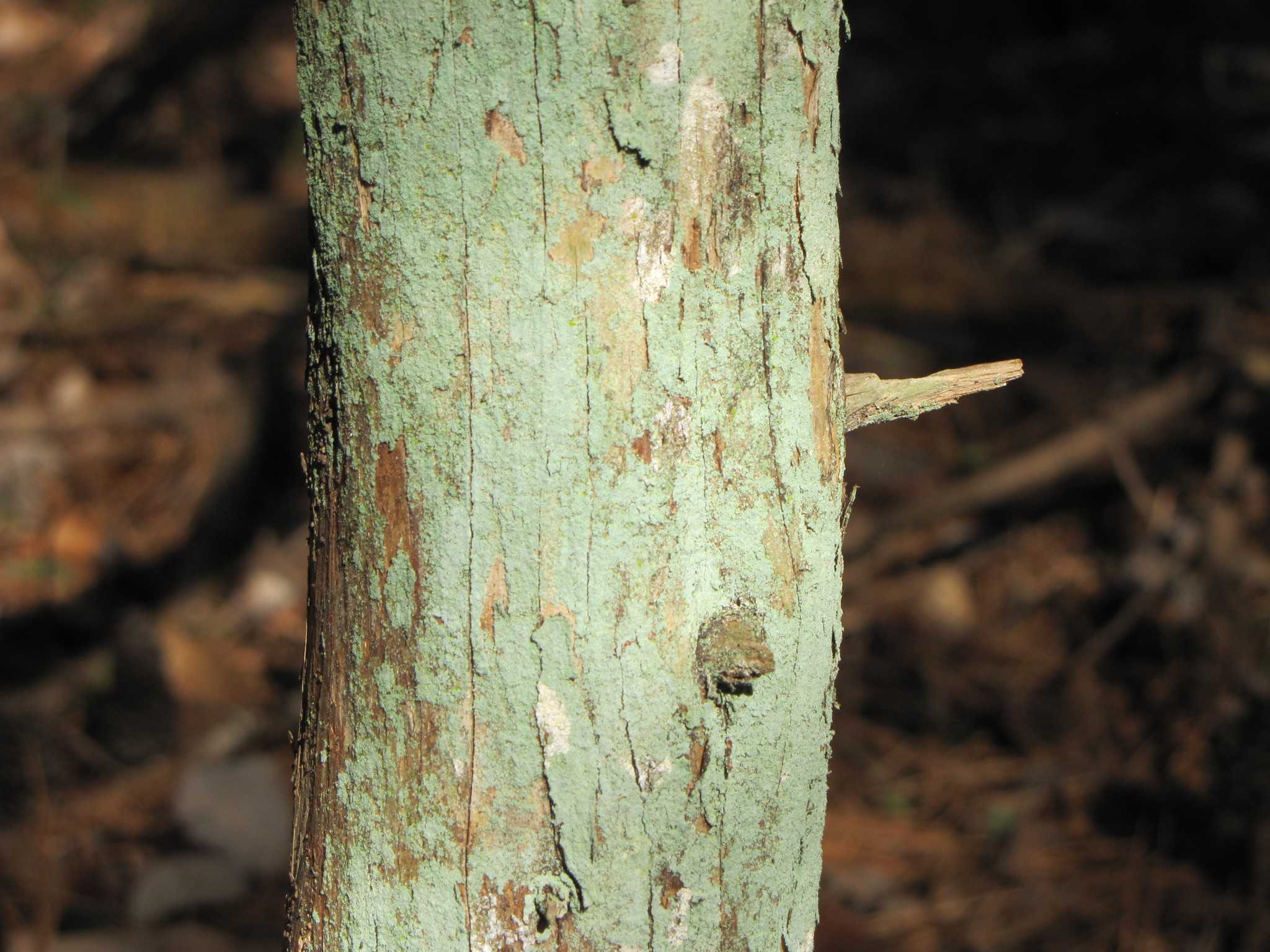
Lepraria finkii

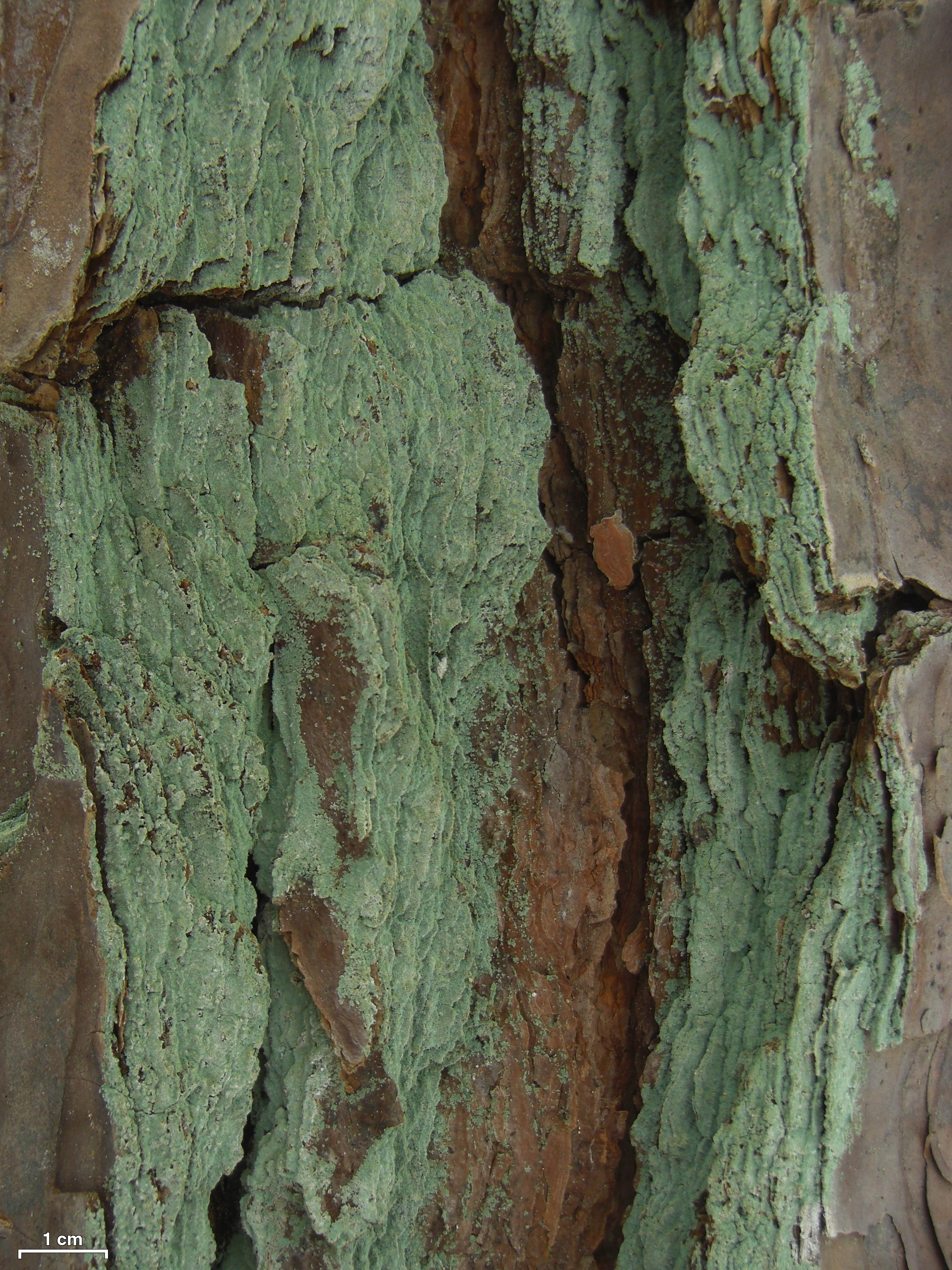
Lepraria harrisiana

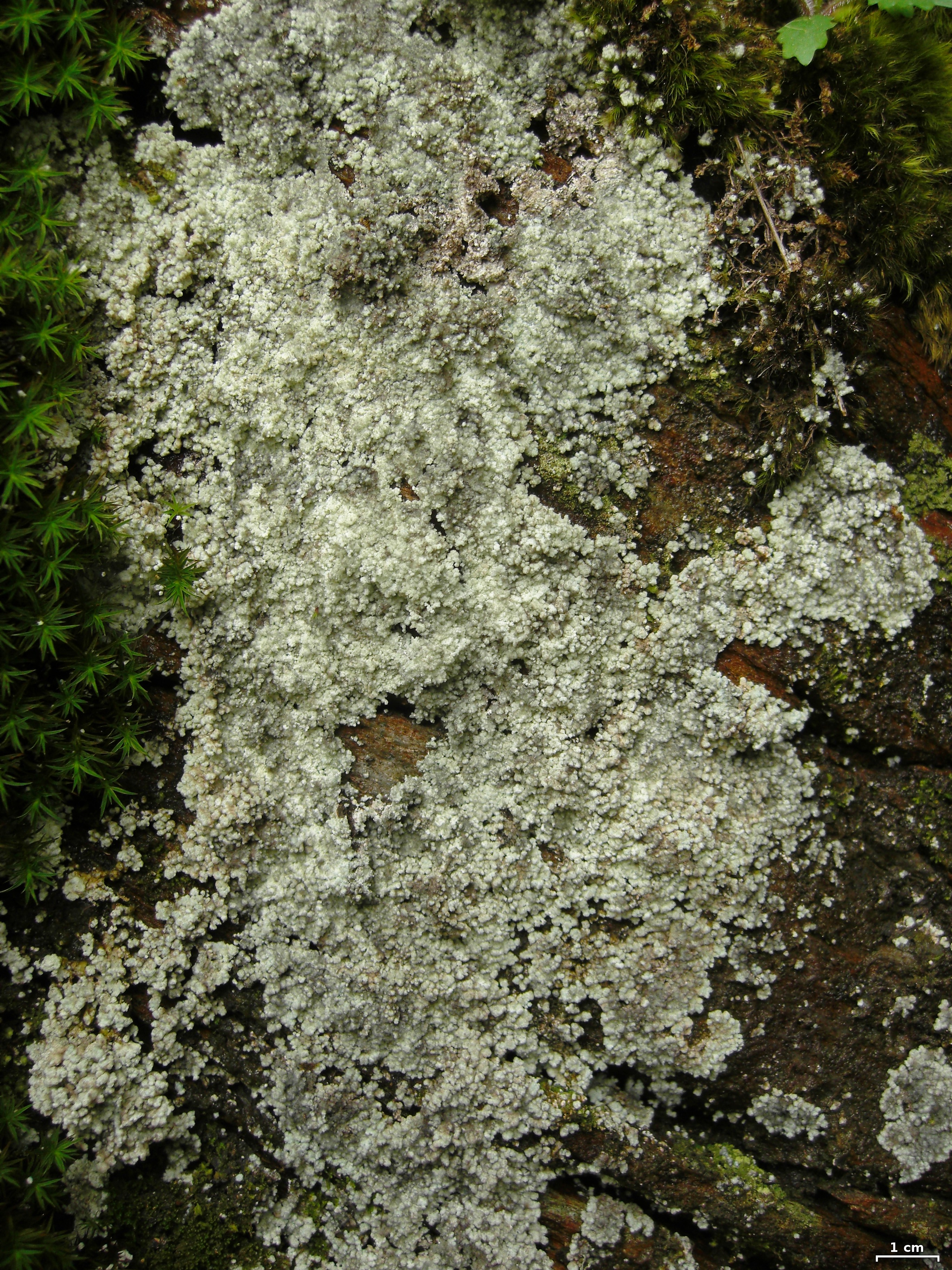
Lepraria lanata

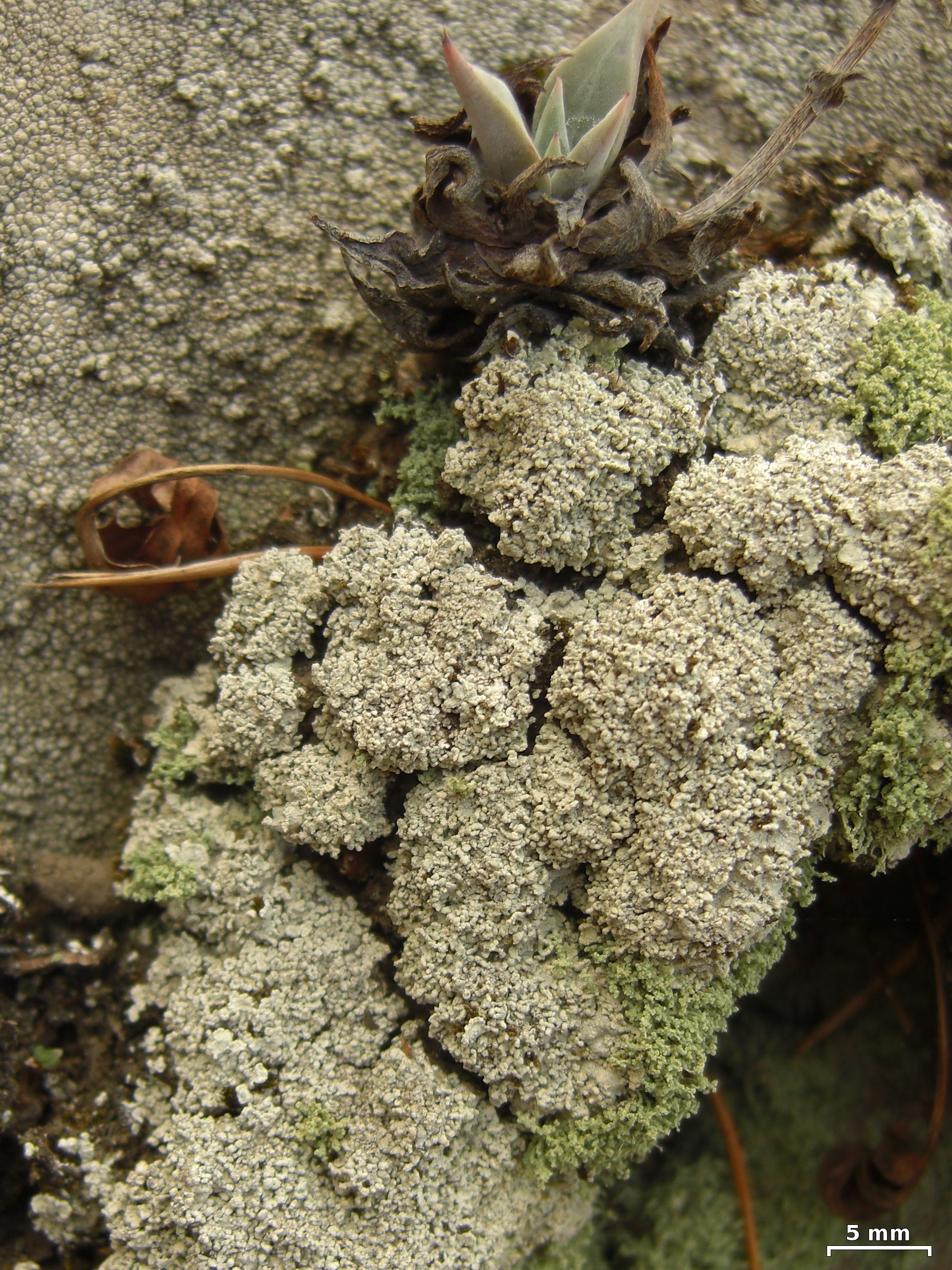
Lepraria xerophila

- Lepraria achariana Flakus & Kukwa (2007) – South America
- Lepraria alba (Roth) Ach. (1799)
- Lepraria albicans (Th.Fr.) Lendemer & B.P.Hodk. (2013)
- Lepraria alpina (B.de Lesd.) Tretiach & Baruffo (2006)
- Lepraria alternata Elix (2013) – Australia
- Lepraria arbuscula (Nyl.) Lendemer & B.P.Hodk. (2013)
- Lepraria atlantica Orange (2001)
- Lepraria aurescens Orange & Wolseley (2005) – Thailand
- Lepraria barbatica Lendemer (2010)
- Lepraria bergensis Tønsberg (2002)
- Lepraria borealis Loht. & Tønsberg (1994)
- Lepraria brasiliensis Elix, A.A.Spielm. & Øvstedal (2010)
- Lepraria brodoi Lendemer & Tønsberg (2014) – North America
- Lepraria cacuminum (A.Massal.) Kümmerl. & Leuckert (1995)
- Lepraria caesiella R.C.Harris (2005)
- Lepraria caesioalba (B.de Lesd.) J.R.Laundon (1992)
- Lepraria celata Slav.-Bay. (2006)
- Lepraria chileana Grewe, Barcenas-Peña, R.Diaz & Lumbsch (2021) – Chile
- Lepraria congesta (Nyl.) Lendemer & B.P.Hodk. (2013)
- Lepraria crassissima (Hue) Lettau (1958)
- Lepraria cryophila Lendemer (2010)
- Lepraria cryptovouauxii Kukwa, Flakus & Guzow-Krzemińska (2019)
- Lepraria cupressicola (Hue) J.R.Laundon (2008)
- Lepraria dibenzofuranica Elix (2008) – Australia
- Lepraria diffusa (J.R.Laundon) Kukwa (2002)
- Lepraria disjuncta Lendemer (2010)
- Lepraria elobata Tønsberg (1992)
- Lepraria finkii (B.de Lesd.) R.C.Harris (1985)
- Lepraria friabilis Lendemer, K.Knudsen & Elix (2008)
- Lepraria gelida Tønsberg & Zhurb. (2006)
- Lepraria glaucosorediata Flakus & Kukwa (2009)
- Lepraria goughensis Elix & Øvstedal (2005)
- Lepraria gracilescens (Nyl.) Lendemer & B.P.Hodk. (2013)
- Lepraria granulata Slav.-Bay. (2007) – Eastern and Central Europe
- Lepraria granulosa Slav.-Bay. (2007)
- Lepraria harrisiana Lendemer (2012)
- Lepraria hodkinsoniana Lendemer (2011)
- Lepraria humida Slav.-Bay. & Orange (2006)
- Lepraria impossibilis Sipman (2004)
- Lepraria incana (L.) Ach. (1803)
- Lepraria indica Rajesh Bajpai & Upreti (2018) – India
- Lepraria isidiata (Llimona) Llimona & A.Crespo (2004)
- Lepraria jackii Tønsberg (1992)
- Lepraria juanfernandezii M.Kukwa (2019)
- Lepraria lanata Tønsberg (2007)
- Lepraria larrainiana Lendemer (2010) – Chile
- Lepraria lecanorica Tønsberg (2004)
- Lepraria lendemeri Bungartz, Elix, G.Hillmann & Kalb (2013)
- Lepraria leprolomopsis Diederich & Sérus. (1997)
- Lepraria leuckertiana (Zedda) L.Saag (2009)
- Lepraria lobata Elix & Kalb (2006) – Australia
- Lepraria lobificans Nyl. (1873)
- Lepraria maderensis Kukwa & Flakus (2011)
- Lepraria malakandensis H.Wahab, S.Uddin & Khalid (2025) – Pakistan
- Lepraria membranacea (Dicks.) Vain. (1921)
- Lepraria methylbarbatica Elix (2008)
- Lepraria multiacida Aptroot (2002) – Brazil
- Lepraria neojackii Flakus & Kukwa (2007) – South America
- Lepraria neozelandica Barcenas-Peña, Grewe & Lumbsch (2021) – New Zealand
- Lepraria nigrocincta Diederich, Sérus. & Aptroot (1997)
- Lepraria nivalis J.R.Laundon (1992)
- Lepraria normandinoides Lendemer & R.C.Harris (2007)
- Lepraria nothofagi Elix & Kukwa (2010)
- Lepraria nylanderiana Kümmerl. & Leuckert (1995)
- Lepraria ohmiensis Kashiw., Keis. Kobay. & K.H.Moon (2009) – Japan
- Lepraria oxybapha Lendemer (2012)
- Lepraria pacifica Lendemer (2011)
- Lepraria pallida Sipman (2004)
- Lepraria pseudoarbuscula (Asahina) Lendemer & B.P.Hodk. (2013)
- Lepraria pulchra Orange & Wolseley (2005) – Thailand
- Lepraria rigidula (B.de Lesd.) Tønsberg (1992)
- Lepraria salazinica Tønsberg (2007)
- Lepraria santosii Argüello & A.Crespo (2006)
- Lepraria sekikaica Elix (2011) – Australia
- Lepraria sipmaniana (Kümmerl. & Leuckert) Kukwa (2002)
- Lepraria squamatica Elix (2006) – Australia
- Lepraria subalbicans (I.M.Lamb) Lendemer & B.P.Hodk. (2013)
- Lepraria sulphurella Räsänen (1949)
- Lepraria svalbardensis Tønsberg (2009)
- Lepraria sylvicola Orange (2006)
- Lepraria tenella (Tuck.) Lendemer & B.P.Hodk. (2013)
- Lepraria toilenae Kantvilas & Kukwa (2006)
- Lepraria torii Pérez-Ort. & T.Sprib. (2009)
- Lepraria umbricola Tønsberg (1992)
- Lepraria ulrikii Grewe, Barcenas-Peña, R.Diaz & Lumbsch (2021) – Australasia
- Lepraria vouauxii (Hue) R.C.Harris (1987)
- Lepraria xanthonica Lendemer (2010)
- Lepraria xerophila Tønsberg (2004)
- Lepraria zeorinica (L.Saag) Kukwa (2009)
