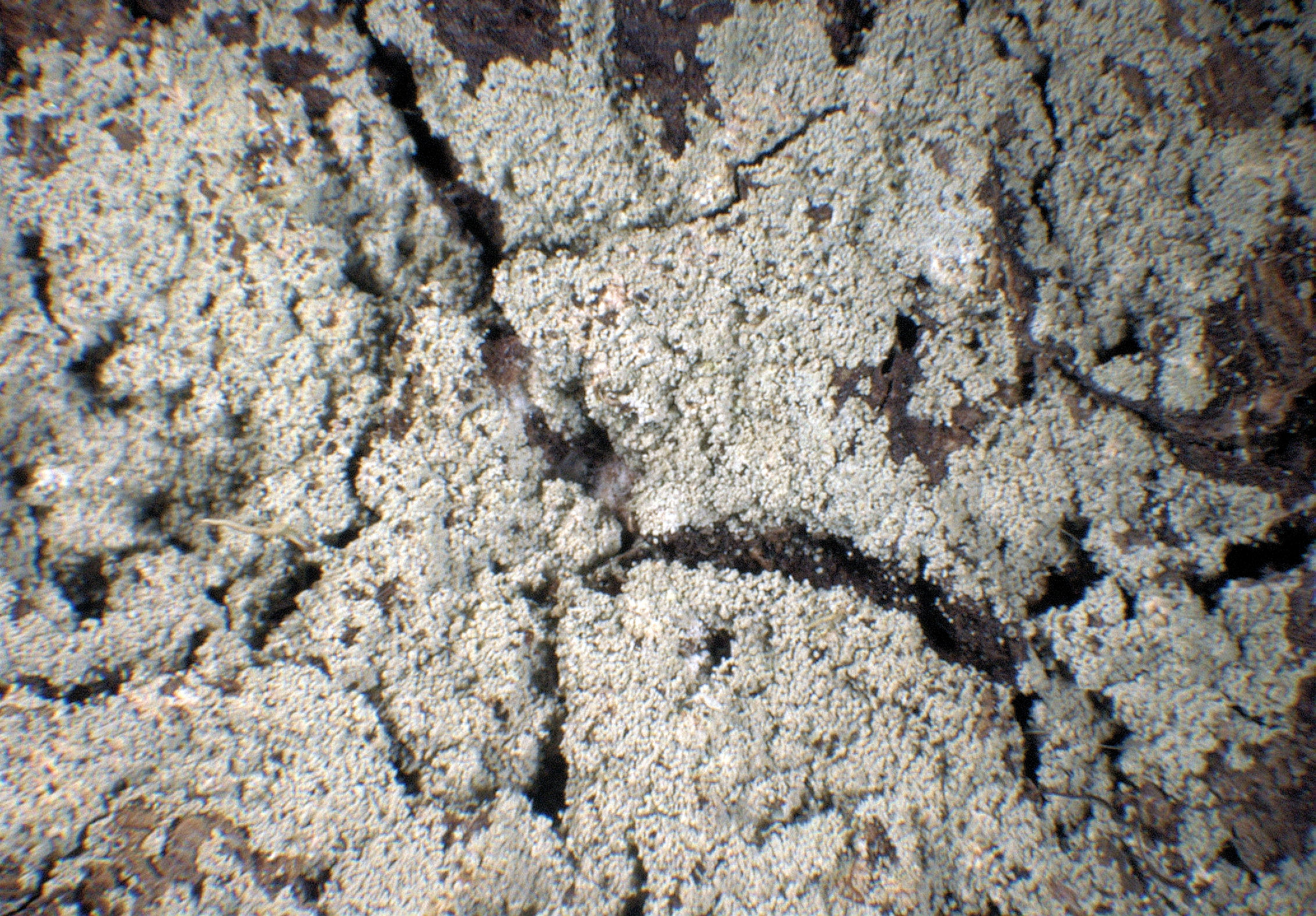

Scientific classification
- Domain: Eukaryota
- Kingdom: Fungi
- Division: Ascomycota
- Class: Lecanoromycetes
- Order: Lecanorales
- Family: Stereocaulaceae
- Genus: Lepraria
- Species: L. elobata

Binomial name
- Lepraria elobata Tønsberg (1992)

= Lepraria elobata =

Species of lichen

Lepraria elobata is a species of leprose lichen in the family Stereocaulaceae. It occurs in Europe, North America, and Greenland. The bluish- to greenish-grey, powdery lichen grows on bark and sometimes on soil, wood, siliceous rock and mosses, usually in shady and humid habitats.

== Taxonomy ==
Lepraria elobata was described by the Norwegian lichenologist Tor Tønsberg in 1992. The holotype was collected by Tønsberg on 28 September 1991 in Hamresanden, Kristiansand, located in Vest-Agder, Norway. Found at an elevation of 5 m, it was growing on the bark of Pinus sylvestris. The specimen, designated Tønsberg 17404, is deposited at the herbarium of the University Museum of Bergen (BG).

== Description ==
Lepraria elobata forms a leprose, powdery thallus that is bluish grey or greenish grey. The margin is diffuse (lacking clear boundaries), and lobes are predominantly absent. The medulla and hypothallus are both typically absent. The soredia are abundant and mostly fine, measuring 20–45 micrometres (μm) in diameter, lacking projecting hyphae, and are well separated from one another. Consoredia (aggregations of soredia) are sometimes present, measuring up to 100 μm. The species is chemically characterised by containing atranorin, stictic acid, constictic acid, cryptostictic acid, zeorin and very rarely an unidentified fatty acid. All of these compounds can be present in varying amounts from major to trace quantities. Spot tests show K− or K+ (yellow), C−, KC−, and Pd+ (orange).

== Habitat and distribution ==
The species grows on bark and sometimes on soil, wood, siliceous rock and mosses. It typically occurs in shady, humid places. Lepraria elobata has been recorded from Europe, North America, and Greenland.
