= Lepraria achariana =

Scientific classification
- Kingdom: Fungi
- Division: Ascomycota
- Class: Lecanoromycetes
- Order: Lecanorales
- Family: Stereocaulaceae
- Genus: Lepraria
- Species: L. achariana

Binomial name
- Lepraria achariana Flakus & Kukwa (2007)
- Holotype: Mount Horca del Inca, Bolivia

Species of lichen

Lepraria achariana is a species of leprose lichen in the family Stereocaulaceae. It occurs at high elevations in Bolivia.

== Taxonomy ==
It was described as new to science by the lichenologists Adam Flakus and Martin Kukwa in 2007. The type specimen was collected in Bolivia, within the La Paz Department, Manco Kapac Province. The collection site is located on Mount Horca del Inca, near the village of Copacabana, at an elevation of 3,974 m (13,038 ft). The specimen was found in a high Andean Puna vegetation zone, growing on rock. It was gathered on 18 June 2006 by Flakus (specimen number 8670) and is deposited as the holotype in the KRAM-L herbarium.

== Description ==
Like other members of the genus Lepraria, this lichen forms a powdery, crust-like growth (the thallus) that never develops fruiting bodies (apothecia). The thallus has a diffuse (undefined) edge and lacks lobes. While it does not have a true inner layer (medulla), it typically has a well-developed loose, cottony base layer (hypothallus) that is white or shows patches of orange colouration. The reproductive structures consist of abundant fine powder-like granules (soredia) up to 45 μm in diameter. These soredia typically cluster together into larger groups (consoredia) up to 75–150 μm across.

The species contains lecanoric acid and roccellic/angardianic acids. It may also contain from two to four unidentified anthraquinone compounds. When tested with common lichen chemical spot tests, it is K− or shows a purple reaction on its underside, C+ (carmine red), KC+ (red), and Pd−.

== Habitat and distribution ==
Lepraria achariana grows on humus, mosses growing on soil (terricolous mosses), and rocks. It has been found in open areas of high Andean Puna grassland vegetation and upper montane cloud forest. The species is only known to occur in Bolivia.
