= Lepraria borealis =

Scientific classification
- Domain: Eukaryota
- Kingdom: Fungi
- Division: Ascomycota
- Class: Lecanoromycetes
- Order: Lecanorales
- Family: Stereocaulaceae
- Genus: Lepraria
- Species: L. borealis

Binomial name
- Lepraria borealis Loht. & Tønsberg (1994)

Species of lichen

Lepraria borealis is a species of leprose lichen in the family Stereocaulaceae, found predominantly in cool climates across Northern Europe, northwestern North America, Greenland, and Antarctica. It primarily grows on acidic rock and moss-covered surfaces, occasionally occurring on soil or other lichens. The species forms a granular crust with abundant soredia and shows considerable chemical variation, typically containing atranorin and rangiformic acid.

== Taxonomy ==
The species was described as new to science by Katileena Lohtander and Tor Tønsberg in 1994. The type specimen was collected in Norway, in Nord-Trøndelag, within Børgefjell National Park. It was found at Namskroken, on the northern bank of the Namsen River, east of Mattisflya, at an elevation of 340 m (1,120 ft). The specimen was growing on moss-covered rock and was collected on 6 June 1977 by Tønsberg (specimen number 1519). It is preserved as the holotype in the University Museum of Bergen (BG) herbarium.

== Description ==
This lichen forms a granular crust that usually has defined edges but can sometimes appear diffuse. While minute lobes may sometimes be present, these lack raised rims. The lichen has an inconspicuous white medulla when present, but typically lacks a base layer (hypothallus). The reproductive structures consist of abundant coarse granules (soredia), typically measuring 100–200 μm in diameter, which often have short projecting threads (hyphae). These soredia sometimes cluster into larger groups (consoredia) of 200–300 μm, occasionally larger. The photobiont partner is a green algal species with a coccoid shaped, measuring up to 20 μm in diameter.

== Chemistry ==
The most common chemical variant contains atranorin, rangiformic acid, and sometimes norrangiformic acid. Less commonly, the rangiformic acid may be replaced by roccellic/angardianic acid, or both fatty acids may be present together. Some specimens contain only fatty acids or only atranorin. The results of chemical spot tests are K− or + (faint yellow), C−, KC−, Pd−.

== Habitat and distribution ==
Lepraria borealis grows primarily on acidic rock and mosses growing over rock, rarely occurring on soil and lichens. It can be found in both exposed and shaded locations, typically in cool climates. The species has been recorded from Northern Europe, northwestern North America (including British Columbia and Washington), Antarctica, and Greenland. In 2010 it was reported from South America.
