= Lepraria caesioalba =

Scientific classification
- Domain: Eukaryota
- Kingdom: Fungi
- Division: Ascomycota
- Class: Lecanoromycetes
- Order: Lecanorales
- Family: Stereocaulaceae
- Genus: Lepraria
- Species: L. caesioalba

Binomial name
- Lepraria caesioalba (B.de Lesd.) J.R.Laundon (1992)

Synonyms
- Crocynia caesioalba B.de Lesd. (1914); Leproloma caesioalba (B.de Lesd.) M.Choisy (1950); Lepraria caesioalba (B.de Lesd.) Tønsberg (1992); Lepraria zonata Brodo (1968); Lepraria caesioalba var. groenlandica L.Saag (2007)

Species of lichen

Lepraria caesioalba is a widely distributed species of leprose lichen in the family Stereocaulaceae.

== Taxonomy ==
The species was first described as Crocynia caesioalba by Maurice Bouly de Lesdain in 1914, and was later transferred to Lepraria by Jack Laundon in 1992. The type specimen was collected in France and is housed at the Royal Botanic Garden Edinburgh (E), with additional topotype material at the Natural History Museum, London (BM), Geneva (GL), and Paris (PC).

== Description ==
This lichen forms a granular crust that usually has defined edges but can sometimes appear diffuse. Small, obscure lobes may be present but lack raised rims. It has an inconspicuous white medulla and usually lacks a base layer (hypothallus), though rarely small patches of exposed medulla may be present. The reproductive structures consist of abundant coarse or variably sized granules (soredia), typically measuring 100–150 (sometimes up to 200) μm in diameter, which sometimes have short projecting threads (hyphae). These soredia frequently cluster into larger groups (consoredia) of 200–300 μm.

The species shows considerable chemical variation, with several distinct variants. The most common form contains atranorin, fumarprotocetraric acid, protocetraric acid (in variable amounts), and either roccellic/angardianic or rangiformic acid. Another common variant contains atranorin, stictic acid complex, and similar fatty acids. A rarer form contains atranorin, psoromic acid, and roccellic/angardianic or rangiformic acid. Spot tests vary depending on the chemical variant but are typically: K− or + (yellow), C−, KC− or + (faint yellow), Pd+ (orange or red).

== Habitat and distribution ==
Lepraria caesioalba typically grows on acidic rock (usually over mosses) and soil, rarely occurring on bark, epiphytic mosses and lichens. It is found in exposed places, mostly in cool climates, and becomes montane-alpine in tropical regions. The species has a wide distribution, having been recorded from Europe, North and South America, Asia, Australasia, Antarctica, and Greenland.
