= Dust lichen =

Dust lichens are lichens in either the genus Chrysothrix or genus Lepraria.
