= Siliceous rock =

Sedimentary rocks that have silica (SiO2) as the principal constituent

Siliceous rocks are sedimentary rocks that have silica (SiO_{2}) as the principal constituent. The most common siliceous rock is chert; other types include diatomite. They commonly form from silica-secreting organisms such as radiolarians, diatoms, or some types of sponges.
