= Stereocaulon groenlandicum =

Conservation status
- Vulnerable (NatureServe)

Scientific classification
- Kingdom: Fungi
- Division: Ascomycota
- Class: Lecanoromycetes
- Order: Lecanorales
- Family: Stereocaulaceae
- Genus: Stereocaulon
- Species: S. groenlandicum

Binomial name
- Stereocaulon groenlandicum (E.Dahl) I.M.Lamb (1973)

Synonyms
- Stereocaulon rivulorum var. groeniandicurn E.Dahl (1950)

Species of lichen

Stereocaulon groenlandicum is a species of snow lichen belonging to the family Stereocaulaceae. The lichen is characterized by its rigid, woody stem-like structures (pseudopodetia) that are firmly attached to the substrate, with small whitish leaf-like structures along their sides. It grows on rocks or soil in Arctic and boreal regions, with a circumpolar distribution pattern that includes Greenland, Alaska, and Spitsbergen. The species contains an unusual chemical composition for its genus, typically featuring atranorin, miriquidic acid, perlatolic acid, and anziaic acid. S. groenlandicum serves as a host to at least a dozen species of lichenicolous fungi and, while not abundant, contributes to the biodiversity of northern polar ecosystems.

== Taxonomy ==
Stereocaulon groenlandicum was first described by the Norwegian lichenologist Eilif Dahl in 1950 as a variety of Stereocaulon rivulorum (var. groenlandicum). The type specimen was collected by Dahl himself in 1937 from Igdlerfigssalik in the Igalikofjord area of South West Greenland's Julianehåb district. The holotype is preserved in the Botanical Museum in Oslo (O), with isotypes (duplicates) housed in the Botanical Museum in Copenhagen (C) and the Smithsonian Institution (US).

In 1973, Elke Mackenzie elevated this taxon to species status, publishing the new combination Stereocaulon groenlandicum. Lamb determined that despite its morphological similarities to S. rivulorum, this lichen possessed sufficient distinctive characteristics to merit recognition as a separate species. These included its robust woody pseudopodetia (stem-like structures) resembling those of S. botryosum, and a unique chemistry that differed significantly from S. rivulorum.

Stereocaulon groenlandicum belongs to the genus Stereocaulon within the family Stereocaulaceae. More specifically, it is classified in subgenus Stereocaulon, section Stereocaulon. While morphologically most similar to S. rivulorum, its chemical profile shows closer affinities to species like S. capitellatum and S. farinaceum, which occur in Scandinavia, Central Europe, and Greenland. The species appears to have a circumpolar boreal-Arctic distribution, with specimens documented from Greenland, Alaska, and Spitsbergen, suggesting it may be more widespread across northern polar regions than initially recognized.

== Description ==
Stereocaulon groenlandicum grows either on rocks (saxicolous) or soil (terricolous) in Arctic and boreal regions. Its most distinctive feature is its rigid, woody stem-like structures called pseudopodetia, which are firmly attached to the substrate. These pseudopodetia stand 2–4 cm high (occasionally reaching 5 cm), with a thickness of 0.5–1.5 mm (sometimes up to 2.0 mm). They are cylindrical in shape, whitish to bone-coloured, and have a matt appearance. The surface lacks a cortex (outer protective layer) and appears smooth or sometimes shows longitudinal striations. The pseudopodetia may be bare or covered with a thin, pale felt-like layer called tomentum. At the base, they occasionally show brownish or rust-coloured tinges.

The pseudopodetia bear small leaf-like or scale-like structures called phyllocladia along their sides. These phyllocladia are more abundant in the upper portions, with lower parts often relatively bare. They appear whitish and begin as grain-like formations that develop into thickly crenate (notched) or digitate (finger-like) squamules. In more developed specimens, they may become lobed and branching, measuring 0.2–0.8 mm across, or up to 1.5 mm when extensively developed.

The species does not produce soredia (powdery reproductive propagules). Its cephalodia (structures containing nitrogen-fixing cyanobacteria) are not abundant and are often inconspicuous. When present, they appear as irregularly shaped, roughly spherical masses 0.5–0.8 mm in diameter, attached to the sides of the pseudopodetia among the phyllocladia. These cephalodia vary in appearance, sometimes appearing bluish-green (aeruginose), but more commonly yellowish or pale brownish and occasionally semi-translucent. Under optimal conditions, they develop as pale brown, vaguely tuberculate (warty) structures, containing the cyanobacterium Nostoc.

The fruiting bodies (apothecia) are relatively common in this species, appearing as terminal structures on the pseudopodetia. They typically become convex with no visible margin, ranging from dark brown to blackish-brown in colour. Mature apothecia can grow quite large (3–6 mm in diameter) and often split into compound masses of smaller, convex discs, each measuring 0.8–1.5 mm across, borne on branched terminal structures. Younger apothecia (0.5–1.5 mm in diameter) may appear flat and shield-like, with a thin, slightly raised dark or pale brown proper margin.

Chemical testing shows that the phyllocladia react K+ (yellow) and PD+ (pale yellow). Chromatographic analysis has revealed that S. groenlandicum typically contains atranorin, miriquidic acid, perlatolic acid, and anziaic acid, plus two unidentified substances—a chemical composition unusual for the genus. Specimens from Spitsbergen have been found to contain only atranorin, representing what appears to be a chemically deficient variant of the species.

== Habitat and distribution ==
Stereocaulon groenlandicum appears to have a circumpolar boreal-Arctic distribution pattern. Current documented locations include southwestern and western Greenland, southern Alaska, and Spitsbergen (Svalbard), suggesting the species may be present throughout northern polar regions, though likely not abundantly. The species grows either directly on rock surfaces or on gravelly soil in exposed Arctic and subarctic environments. Based on collection records, it occurs at varying elevations, from near sea level up to about 800 metres above sea level in Greenland and between 460 and 1500 metres in Alaska. Collection sites include the Igalikofjord area in southwestern Greenland, the Richardson Highway and Bald Mountain Ridge in south-central Alaska, the upper Swift Fork valley of the Kuskokwim River in the Alaska Range, and a peninsula west of Grønfjorden in Isfjorden, western Spitsbergen.

== Ecology ==
Stereocaulon groenlandicum is a known host to the lichenicolous fungus species:

- Arthonia stereocaulina
- Catillaria stereocaulorum
- Cercidospora stereocaulorum
- Diploschistes muscorum
- Lasiosphaeriopsis stereocaulicola
- Lichenopeltella stereocaulorum
- Lichenosticta dombrovskae
- Opegrapha stereocaulicola
- Polycoccum trypethelioides
- Rhymbocarpus stereocaulorum
- Scutula stereocaulorum
- Sphaerellothecium stereocaulorum
- Taeniolella christiansenii
