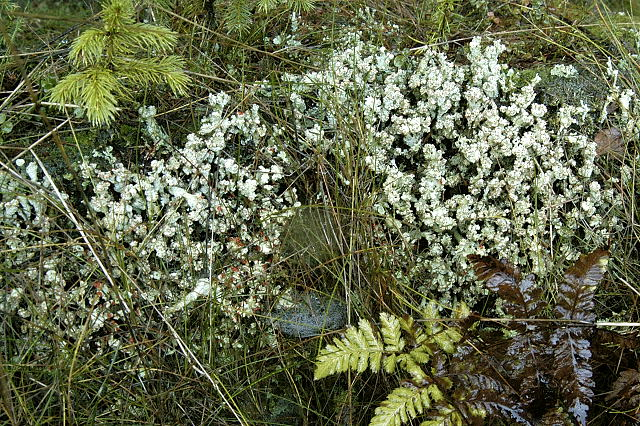

Conservation status
- Secure (NatureServe)

Scientific classification
- Kingdom: Fungi
- Division: Ascomycota
- Class: Lecanoromycetes
- Order: Lecanorales
- Family: Stereocaulaceae
- Genus: Stereocaulon
- Species: S. alpinum

Binomial name
- Stereocaulon alpinum Laurer

Synonyms
- Stereocaulon tomentosum var. alpinum (Laurer) Th. Fr.; Stereocaulon paschale var. alpinum (Laurer) Mudd

= Stereocaulon alpinum =

Species of fungus

Stereocaulon alpinum is a species of fungus belonging to the family Stereocaulaceae. It is similar to Stereocaulon paschale but differs from it in containing cyanobacteria of the genus Nostoc while S. paschale contains cyanobacteria of the genus Stigonema, which have a darker colour than Nostoc.

== Ecology ==
Stereocaulon alpinum is a known host species to lichenicolous fungi, which are pathogenic or commensal species living on the surface or in the thallus of the lichen. These include:

- Arthonia stereocaulina
- Catillaria stereocaulorum
- Cercidospora stereocaulorum
- Diploschistes muscorum
- Endococcus nanellus
- Lasiosphaeriopsis stereocaulicola
- Lichenopeltella stereocaulorum
- Lichenosticta dombrovskae
- Merismatum decolorans
- Opegrapha stereocaulicola
- Polycoccum trypethelioides
- Rhymbocarpus stereocaulorum
- Scutula stereocaulorum
- Stigmidium beringicum
- Taeniolella christiansenii
