= Endococcus nanellus =

Scientific classification
- Domain: Eukaryota
- Kingdom: Fungi
- Division: Ascomycota
- Class: Dothideomycetes
- Order: Lichenotheliales
- Family: Lichenotheliaceae
- Genus: Endococcus
- Species: E. nanellus

Binomial name
- Endococcus nanellus Ohlert (1891)

Synonyms
- Tichothecium nanellum (Ohlert) Arnold

Species of lichen

Endococcus nanellus is a species of lichenicolous fungus in the order Dothideales. It is known from Alaska, Canada, Greenland, Hawaii, Japan, Russia, South-Korea, and Kazakhstan.

== Host species ==
Endococcus nanellus is known to infect numerous species of the genus Stereocaulon, including the following species:

- Stereocaulon alpinum
- Stereocaulon botryosum
- Stereocaulon glareosum
- Stereocaulon grande
- Stereocaulon myriocarpum
- Stereocaulon nigrum
- Stereocaulon paschale
- Stereocaulon saxatile
- Stereocaulon tomentosum
- Stereocaulon vesuvianum
