= Stereocaulon intermedium =

Conservation status
- Apparently Secure (NatureServe)

Scientific classification
- Kingdom: Fungi
- Division: Ascomycota
- Class: Lecanoromycetes
- Order: Lecanorales
- Family: Stereocaulaceae
- Genus: Stereocaulon
- Species: S. intermedium

Binomial name
- Stereocaulon intermedium (Savicz) H.Magn. (1926)

Synonyms
- Stereocaulon coralloides f. intermedium Savicz (1923)

Species of lichen

Stereocaulon intermedium is a species of snow lichen belonging to the family Stereocaulaceae.

== Ecology ==
Stereocaulon intermedium is a known host to the lichenicolous fungus species:

- Arthonia stereocaulina
- Catillaria stereocaulorum
- Cercidospora stereocaulorum
- Lasiosphaeriopsis stereocaulicola
- Polycoccum trypethelioides
- Taeniolella christiansenii
