= Stereocaulon subcoralloides =

Conservation status
- Vulnerable (NatureServe)

Scientific classification
- Kingdom: Fungi
- Division: Ascomycota
- Class: Lecanoromycetes
- Order: Lecanorales
- Family: Stereocaulaceae
- Genus: Stereocaulon
- Species: S. subcoralloides

Binomial name
- Stereocaulon subcoralloides Nyl.

Species of lichen

Stereocaulon subcoralloides is a species of snow lichen belonging to the family Stereocaulaceae.

== Ecology ==
Stereocaulon subcoralloides is a known host to the lichenicolous fungus species:

- Catillaria stereocaulorum
- Cercidospora stereocaulorum
- Diploschistes muscorum
- Opegrapha stereocaulicola
