= Stereocaulon arenarium =

Conservation status
- Apparently Secure (NatureServe)

Scientific classification
- Kingdom: Fungi
- Division: Ascomycota
- Class: Lecanoromycetes
- Order: Lecanorales
- Family: Stereocaulaceae
- Genus: Stereocaulon
- Species: S. arenarium

Binomial name
- Stereocaulon arenarium (Savicz) I.M.Lamb (1972)

Synonyms
- Stereocaulon denudatum f. arenarium Savicz (1923)

Species of lichen

Stereocaulon arenarium is a species of snow lichen belonging to the family Stereocaulaceae.

== Ecology ==
Stereocaulon arenarium is a known host to the lichenicolous fungus species Lasiosphaeriopsis stereocaulicola.
