= Cladonia imbricarica =

Conservation status
- Imperiled (NatureServe)

Scientific classification
- Kingdom: Fungi
- Division: Ascomycota
- Class: Lecanoromycetes
- Order: Lecanorales
- Family: Cladoniaceae
- Genus: Cladonia
- Species: C. imbricarica

Binomial name
- Cladonia imbricarica Kristinsson (1974)

Species of lichen

Cladonia imbricarica is a species of terricolous (ground-dwelling), fruticose lichen in the family Cladoniaceae. Originally found in Iceland, it was described as new to science in 1974. It has since been identified in continental Europe and North America.

== Taxonomy ==
Cladonia imbricarica was described from specimens collected in Iceland. The holotype was gathered by Kristinsson on 15 July 1971 at Oddkelsalda, Þjórsárdalur, central Iceland, at an elevation of 590 m (1,940 ft). The species name imbricarica originally referred to the supposed presence of imbricaric acid. However, subsequent chemical analyses revealed that the primary chemical constituent is actually sphaerophorin, not imbricaric acid, as previously thought.

Morphologically, C. imbricarica is related to members of the Cladonia chlorophaea group and closely resembles Cladonia pyxidata. It differs significantly in chemical composition, the presence of almost sessile (unstalked) cups, and distinctively shaped, short podetia.

== Description ==
The primary thallus of Cladonia imbricarica consists of medium-sized squamules, typically 0.5–3 mm wide, arranged horizontally or slightly ascending. The squamules are rounded with moderately incised margins and have a green to brownish upper surface and a white underside. The cortex is about 30–60 μm thick, with a surface ranging from fissured and verruculose (wart-like) to smooth. The medulla measures 90–220 μm thick.

The species produces short, often nearly sessile podetia, up to 8 mm tall. Younger podetia typically have short stalks (0.5–2 mm) and smaller cups (scyphi) measuring 1–4 mm wide. Older podetia are usually stalkless or have stalks up to 3 mm, with broader cups (4–6 mm in diameter) having a distinctly flattened, wide-rimmed appearance. The margins of the cups may be irregularly toothed, and the outer surface is greyish-green, sometimes areolate or eroded in older specimens. The inside of the cups is brownish and contains small corticated granules (0.1–0.5 mm wide), with larger granules flattened and older surfaces partly decorticated. Apothecia and pycnidia have not been observed in any examined specimens.

Chemically, C. imbricarica contains primarily sphaerophorin. It shows negative reactions to standard chemical spot tests (K−, C−, KC−, PD−), distinguishing it clearly from closely related species, such as C. pyxidata and C. grayi.

== Habitat and distribution ==
Initially known only from Iceland, Cladonia imbricarica has since been found in additional localities in southern Norway, as well as in the U.S. states of Wyoming and South Dakota. In Norway, it occurs in sandy and gravelly soils, often on unstable slopes or roadside cuttings with sparse vegetation. At these localities, it grows alongside lichens such as Cladonia pyxidata, Cladonia acuminata, and species of Stereocaulon, including Stereocaulon glareosum. The habitats in Norway lie within northern boreal pine forests at elevations between 680 m (2,230 ft) and 860 m (2,820 ft) above sea level, characterized by a relatively dry, continental climate with annual precipitation between 300 and 500 mm.

Based on its occurrence in both continental and oceanic regions of North America and Europe, C. imbricarica likely has a broader distribution than previously recognized and may have a nearly circumpolar distribution. Its preference for neutral to slightly acidic sandy or gravelly substrates and its role as a pioneer species suggest specialized ecological requirements.

== See also ==
- List of Cladonia species
