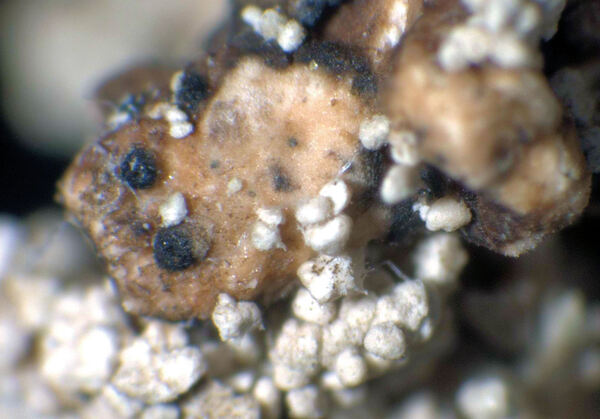
- growing on Stereocaulon rivulorum

Scientific classification
- Kingdom: Fungi
- Division: Ascomycota
- Class: Dothideomycetes
- Order: Dothideales
- Genus: Cercidospora
- Species: C. stereocaulorum

Binomial name
- Cercidospora stereocaulorum (Arnold) Hafellner (1987)

Synonyms
- Leptosphaeria stereocaulorum Arnold; Metasphaeria stereocaulorum (Arnold) Sacc.; Sphaerulina stereocaulorum (Arnold) Anon.; Sphaerulina stereocaulorum (Arnold) Vou.

= Cercidospora stereocaulorum =

Species of fungus

Cercidospora stereocaulorum is a species of lichenicolous fungus in the genus Cercidospora but it has not been assigned to a family. It is known to parasitise lichens of the genus Stereocaulon.

== Similar species ==
Cercidospora stereocaulorum is similar to Cercidospora punctillata and Cercidospora decolorella but they can be told apart from their spore biology and their host species. Cercidospora punctillata grows on various lichens, most commonly Solorina crocea and species of Peltigera, while Cercidospora decolorella grows on mosses. Cercidospora alpina also grows on species of Stereocaulon and can therefore be confused with Cercidospora stereocaulorum.

== Distribution ==
Cercidospora stereocaulorum has been reported from Alaska, Canada, Greenland, Iceland, Russia, including Wrangel Island and Svalbard.

== Host species and symptoms ==
It grows on phyllocladia, stems and occasionally cephalodia and old apothecia of its host species. It can induce gall-like swellings up to 1.5 mm in diameter and the infected host tissues can become pinkish or slightly bleached. Infection does not induce any other known symptoms.

Host species include:

- Stereocaulon alpinum
- Stereocaulon botryosum
- Stereocaulon depressum
- Stereocaulon glareosum
- Stereocaulon groenlandicum
- Stereocaulon intermedium
- Stereocaulon paschale
- Stereocaulon rivulorum
- Stereocaulon saxatile
- Stereocaulon subcoralloides
- Stereocaulon symphycheilum
- Stereocaulon vesuvianum
