= Stereocaulon depressum =

Scientific classification
- Domain: Eukaryota
- Kingdom: Fungi
- Division: Ascomycota
- Class: Lecanoromycetes
- Order: Lecanorales
- Family: Stereocaulaceae
- Genus: Stereocaulon
- Species: S. depressum

Binomial name
- Stereocaulon depressum (Frey) I.M.Lamb (1969)

Synonyms
- Stereocaulon botryosum f. depressum Frey (1932)

Species of lichen

Stereocaulon depressum is a species of snow lichen belonging to the family Stereocaulaceae.

== Ecology ==
Stereocaulon depressum is a known host to the lichenicolous fungus species:

- Arthonia stereocaulina
- Catillaria stereocaulorum
- Cercidospora stereocaulorum
- Dactylospora deminuta
- Diploschistes muscorum
- Lasiosphaeriopsis stereocaulicola
- Lichenopeltella stereocaulorum
- Niesslia peltigericola
- Opegrapha stereocaulicola
- Phaeosporobolus alpinus
- Polycoccum trypethelioides
- Rhymbocarpus stereocaulorum
- Scutula stereocaulorum
- Taeniolella christiansenii
