= Scutula stereocaulorum =

Scientific classification
- Kingdom: Fungi
- Division: Ascomycota
- Class: Lecanoromycetes
- Order: Lecanorales
- Family: Ramalinaceae
- Genus: Scutula
- Species: S. stereocaulorum

Binomial name
- Scutula stereocaulorum (Anzi) Körb. (1865)

Synonyms
- Lecidea stereocaulorum (Anzi) (1862); Biatorina stereocaulorum (Anzi) Jatta (1911); Spilodium stereocaulorum (Anzi) Nieuwl. (1916)

Species of fungus

Scutula stereocaulorum is a species of lichenicolous fungus in the family Ramalinaceae.

== Host species ==
Scutula stereocaulorum can use lichens of the genus Stereocaulon as hosts. It is very common and so far the following host species have been recorded:

- Stereocaulon alpinum
- Stereocaulon depressum
- Stereocaulon glareosum
- Stereocaulon groenlandicum
- Stereocaulon rivulorum
- Stereocaulon saxatile
- Stereocaulon tornoense
- Stereocaulon vesuvianum
