= Stereocaulon incrustatum =

Conservation status
- Secure (NatureServe)

Scientific classification
- Kingdom: Fungi
- Division: Ascomycota
- Class: Lecanoromycetes
- Order: Lecanorales
- Family: Stereocaulaceae
- Genus: Stereocaulon
- Species: S. incrustatum

Binomial name
- Stereocaulon incrustatum Flörke (1819)

Species of lichen

Stereocaulon incrustatum is a species of snow lichen belonging to the family Stereocaulaceae.

Forms and varieties:

- Stereocaulon incrustatum f. gracile
- Stereocaulon incrustatum f. gracilis
- Stereocaulon incrustatum f. incrustatum
- Stereocaulon incrustatum var. abduanum
- Stereocaulon incrustatum var. elaturn
- Stereocaulon incrustatum var. incrustatum

== Ecology ==
Stereocaulon incrustatum is a known host to the lichenicolous fungus species Rhymbocarpus stereocaulorum.
