= Eilifdahlia sergeyana =

Scientific classification
- Kingdom: Fungi
- Division: Ascomycota
- Class: Lecanoromycetes
- Order: Teloschistales
- Family: Teloschistaceae
- Genus: Eilifdahlia
- Species: E. sergeyana

Binomial name
- Eilifdahlia sergeyana (Kantvilas) S.Y.Kondr., Elix, Kärnefelt & A.Thell (2017)
- Holotype: Creek Bay Farm, Kangaroo Island

Synonyms
- Caloplaca sergeyana Kantvilas (2016)

Species of lichen

Eilifdahlia sergeyana is a species of saxicolous (rock-dwelling), crustose lichen in the family Teloschistaceae. It is endemic to Kangaroo Island in South Australia. The lichen thallus has an uneven and scaly texture, forming patches up to 40 mm wide in dull greenish-grey or brownish-grey. Its fruiting bodies (apothecia) are orange to yellow, with a biatorine structure, and range from 0.5 to 1 mm wide. These apothecia have a matte surface and a cup-shaped margin containing golden-yellow crystals. The paraphyses within are slender and branched, and the asci contain ellipsoid spores.

== Taxonomy ==
The lichen was first formally described as a new species in 2016 by the Australian lichenologist Gintaras Kantvilas, who classified it in the genus Caloplaca. The type specimen was collected by the author in 2013 at Creek Bay Farm on Kangaroo Island, at an elevation of 85 m (279 ft). It was found growing on rocks within a mallee woodland. The species name honours the Ukrainian lichenologist Sergey Kondratyuk, "in acknowledgement of his enormous contributions to the taxonomy of the genus Caloplaca in Australia". In 2017, Sergey Kondratyuk and colleagues transferred the taxon to the genus Eilifdahlia.

== Description ==
Eilifdahlia sergeyana has an uneven and rough texture that mimics the coarse nature of its growing surface. It forms irregular patches, typically 30–40 mm in width, with a dull greenish-grey to brownish-grey colour. The thickness of the thallus varies, reaching up to 250 μm in some areas but is generally much thinner. The photobiont cells within the lichen are roughly spherical, measuring 5–15 μm across.

The apothecia of Eilifdahlia sergeyana, the lichen's fruiting bodies, are scattered and range in colour from orange to orange-yellow. Each apothecium measures 0.5–0.8 mm, occasionally up to 1 mm wide. They are strictly biatorine, meaning they have a clearly defined thalline margin, and are sessile with a base that narrows. Initially, the discs of these apothecia are concave but become flat or slightly undulating over time. They have a matte, non-pruinose (non-powdery) surface. The proper margin of the apothecia is initially somewhat rolled inward and glossy, becoming slightly flexible with age. In cross-section, the margin is cup-shaped, measuring 60–80 μm thick at the sides and 70–120 μm thick in the centre. This outer layer contains dense, golden-yellow crystals that turn crimson and dissolve in a solution of potassium hydroxide. The margin is made up of radiating, parallel, interconnected hyphae, which are 3–5 μm thick with lumina (cell gaps) of 2–3 μm, and does not contain any photobiont cells.

Beneath the apothecia, the subhymenium is mostly hyaline (translucent) with a yellowish band at the lower part, measuring 30–40 μm thick. The hymenium above is 70–80 μm thick, also hyaline and not inspersed with oil droplets, and covered by a dense band of golden-yellow crystals similar to the apothecial margin. The paraphyses (filamentous structures within the hymenium) are 1.5–2 μm thick. They become more richly branched towards the top, with their tips slightly expanding to 3–5 μm. The asci (spore-bearing cells) typically contain eight spores and measure 40–55 by 15–20 μm. The ascospores are polaribilocular (having two compartments at the poles) and broadly ellipsoid, measuring 11–17 by 5–8.5 μm. The septum (internal partition in the spore), is 3–9 μm thick.

No pycnidia (asexual reproductive structures) have been found in this species. Chemically, Eilifdahlia sergeyana contains only parietin as a secondary metabolite (lichen product).

=== Similar species ===
Eilifdahlia sergeyana closely resembles the common corticolous (bark-dwelling) species Eilifdahlia dahlii, particularly in its biatorine, orange to orange-yellow apothecia. It is distinct primarily in its substrate preferences and by its scurfy, underdeveloped thallus, which does not contain lichexanthone.

== Habitat and distribution ==
Eilifdahlia sergeyana is known to occur only at the type locality on the Dudley Peninsula of Kangaroo Island, where it grows on sandstone boulders.
