= Stereocaulon myriocarpum =

Conservation status
- Apparently Secure (NatureServe)

Scientific classification
- Kingdom: Fungi
- Division: Ascomycota
- Class: Lecanoromycetes
- Order: Lecanorales
- Family: Stereocaulaceae
- Genus: Stereocaulon
- Species: S. myriocarpum

Binomial name
- Stereocaulon myriocarpum Th.Fr. (1857)

Species of lichen-forming fungus

Stereocaulon myriocarpum is a species of snow lichen belonging to the family Stereocaulaceae.

== Habitat and distribution ==
In Nepal, Stereocaulon myriocarpum has been reported from 3,900 to 5,303 m elevation in a compilation of published records; this reported range extends above the tree line used in the study.

== Ecology ==
Stereocaulon myriocarpum is a known host to the lichenicolous fungus species:

- Arthonia stereocaulina
- Endococcus nanellus
- Polycoccum trypethelioides
