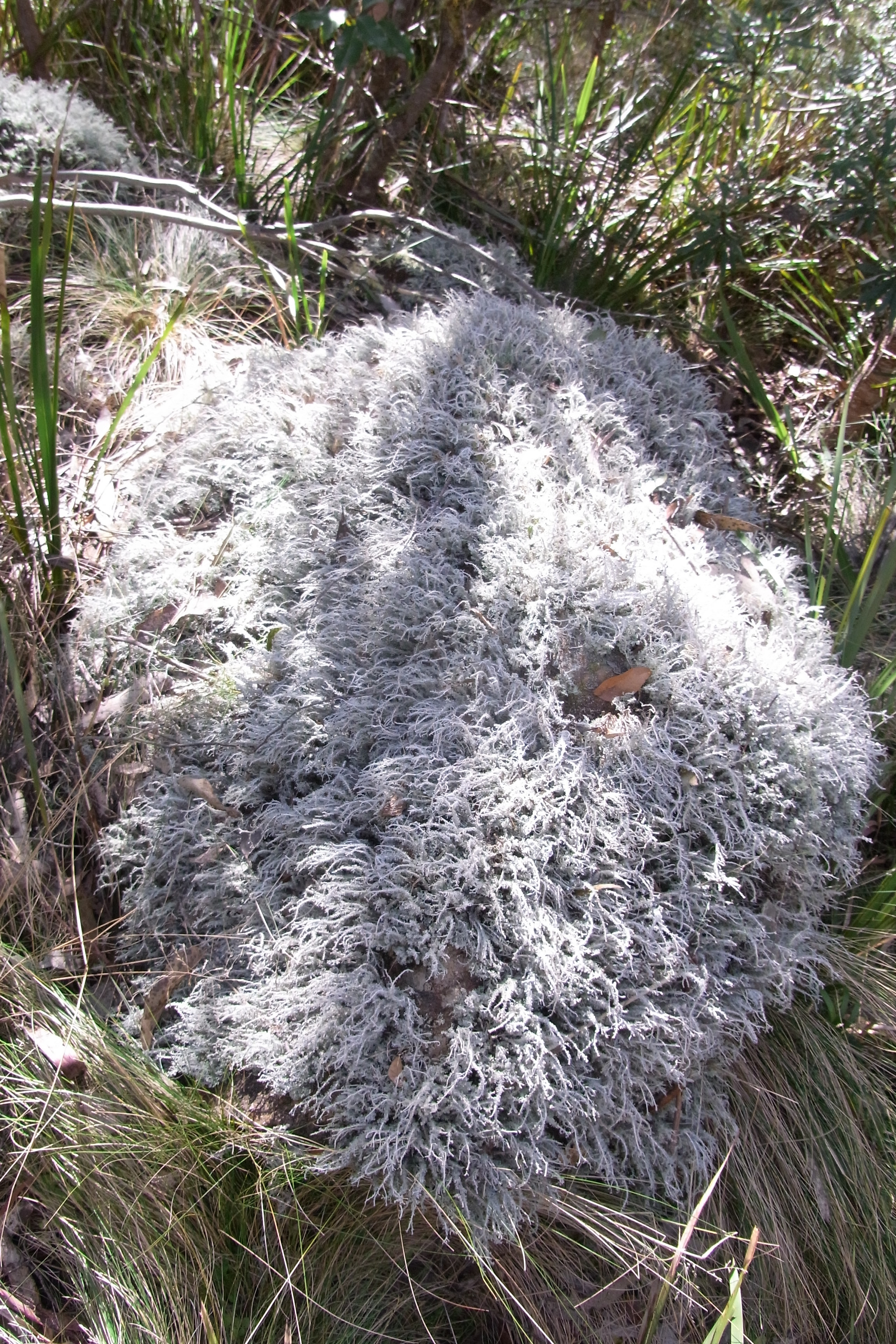
- Barrington Tops National Park, Australia

Scientific classification
- Domain: Eukaryota
- Kingdom: Fungi
- Division: Ascomycota
- Class: Lecanoromycetes
- Order: Lecanorales
- Family: Stereocaulaceae
- Genus: Stereocaulon
- Species: S. ramulosum

Binomial name
- Stereocaulon ramulosum Raeusch.

Synonyms
- Lichen ramulosus Sw.

= Stereocaulon ramulosum =

Snow lichen

Species of lichen

Stereocaulon ramulosum, commonly known as snow lichen, is a terricolous fruticose lichen belonging to the family Stereocaulaceae. It has cosmopolitan distribution. In the Australasian region, it is common in eastern Australia, New Zealand and has also been recorded at Lord Howe Island and Macquarie Island.

Its habitat is often cooler, moist areas with a high level of cloud cover. It may be found on rocky ground or as an epiphyte on tree branches. Stereocaulon ramulosum was the first lichen known to contain an amylose polysaccharide.

This species is unusual, as the fungal component is associated with two different chlorophyll forming species; usually there is only one. The more significant one is a green alga which gives the lichen its characteristic colour. The second is a cyanobacteria which is found in the cephalodia, a wart-like structure. Three different kingdoms are represented in this single life form; Fungi, Protista and Eubacteria.

The generic name Stereocaulon is derived from ancient Greek stereós and Latin caulis, referring to the hard stem of the central part of the lichen. The specific epithet ramulosum is derived from the Latin ramulose, and means "having many small branches".

== Phytochemistry ==
The characteristic secondary metabolite of S. ramulosum is atranorin, a depside. During the extraction phase, atranorin suffer an alcoholysis reaction, producing methyl/ethyl haemmatomate and methyl ß-orcinol carboxylate. Has been identified in New Zealand and in east central Africa, perlatolic acid, anziaic acid and methyl haemmatomate. Methyl haemmatomate has in-vitro antifungical activity. Huneck in Chiloe, Chile, identify atranorin, perlatolic acid and lobaric acid. Also, in Pongo, Bolivia, Vila et al. aislate the polyol galactitol and 1,3,7-trimethylguanine, an unusual alkaloid.

Carbohydrates have been found.. A linear (1→3) linked ß-D-glucan, and β-GalCer-lich, a new immune stimulant carbohydrate.
