= Hertelidea wankaensis =

Scientific classification
- Domain: Eukaryota
- Kingdom: Fungi
- Division: Ascomycota
- Class: Lecanoromycetes
- Order: Lecanorales
- Family: Stereocaulaceae
- Genus: Hertelidea
- Species: H. wankaensis

Binomial name
- Hertelidea wankaensis Kantvilas & Elix (2006)

Species of lichen

Hertelidea wankaensis is a species of crustose lichen in the family Stereocaulaceae. It is found in northeastern Australia, where it grows on dead wood.

== Taxonomy ==
The lichen was described as a new species in 2006 by lichenologists Gintaras Kantvilas and John Alan Elix. The type was collected along Wanka Road, south of Dalby, Queensland. Here it was found growing on dead eucalyptus wood in grassland, at an altitude of 340 m (1,120 ft). The specific epithet wankaensis is formed from the name of its type locality with the Latin ending -ensis ("place of origin") appended.

== Description ==
The lichen has a dull grey crustose thallus comprising irregular, gnarled areoles that are 0.1–0.3 mm wide. There are numerous apothecia measuring 0.3–0.8 mm in diameter, which occur either singly or sometimes fused in clusters of two or three. Ascospores are hyaline, broadly ellipsoid to ovate in shape, and typically 6–13 by 4–6 μm. There are two types of conidia present. The macroconidia are ellipsoid, measuring 8–12 by 3.5–4 μm, and usually contain two vacuoles; the microconidia are bacilliform to fusiform with blunt tips and measure 5–7.5 by 1.5 μm. What most distinguishes Hertelidea wankaensis from another member of the genus Hertelidea is its chemistry: it contains fatty acids that comprise the constipatic acid chemosyndrome (a set of major and minor natural metabolic products produced by a species), including constipatic acid (major constituent), dehydroconstipatic acid, subdecipienic acid A, and subdecipienic acid B, the latter three all as minor constituents. In contrast, other members of the genus have perlatolic acid or homosekikaic acid.
