= Sphaerellothecium araneosum =

Scientific classification
- Domain: Eukaryota
- Kingdom: Fungi
- Division: Ascomycota
- Class: Sordariomycetes
- Order: Phyllachorales
- Family: Phyllachoraceae
- Genus: Sphaerellothecium
- Species: S. araneosum

Binomial name
- Sphaerellothecium araneosum (Rehm ex Arnold) Zopf (1897)

Synonyms
- Discothecium araneosum (Rehm ex Arnold) Vouaux; Echinothecium glabrum M.S.Christ., Alstrup & D.Hawksw.; Endococcus araneosus (Rehm ex Arnold) H.Olivier; Epicymatia araneosa (Rehm ex Arnold) Sacc.; Mycosphaerella araneosa (Rehm ex Arnold) Lindau; Phaeosphaerella araneosa (Rehm ex Arnold) Sacc. & D.Sacc.; Sphaerella araneosa Rehm; Sphaerella araneosa Rehm ex Arnold

Species of fungus

Sphaerellothecium araneosum is a species of lichenicolous fungus in the family Phyllachoraceae.

== Distribution ==
Sphaerellothecium araneosum has been reported from the highlands of Iceland and the Arctic desert of Severnaya Zemlya in Russia.

== Host species and symptoms ==
Sphaerellothecium araneosum commonly grows on species of Ochrolechia, such as Ochrolechia frigida but it also grows on Stereocaulon rivulorum and Stereocaulon vesuvianum, on which it causes no known symptoms. It is common in Cladonia pocillum and Cladonia symphycarpia, and less common but present in Cladonia coccifera, Cladonia gracilis, Cladonia macroceras, Cladonia pyxidata and Cladonia subcervicornis. The population infecting Cladonia is considered a separate variety from other Sphaerellothecium araneosum.
