= Stereocaulon symphycheilum =

Conservation status
- Secure (NatureServe)

Scientific classification
- Kingdom: Fungi
- Division: Ascomycota
- Class: Lecanoromycetes
- Order: Lecanorales
- Family: Stereocaulaceae
- Genus: Stereocaulon
- Species: S. symphycheilum

Binomial name
- Stereocaulon symphycheilum I.M.Lamb

Species of lichen

Stereocaulon symphycheilum is a species of snow lichen belonging to the family Stereocaulaceae.

== Ecology ==
Stereocaulon symphycheilum is a known host to the lichenicolous fungus species:

- Cercidospora stereocaulorum
- Taeniolella christiansenii
