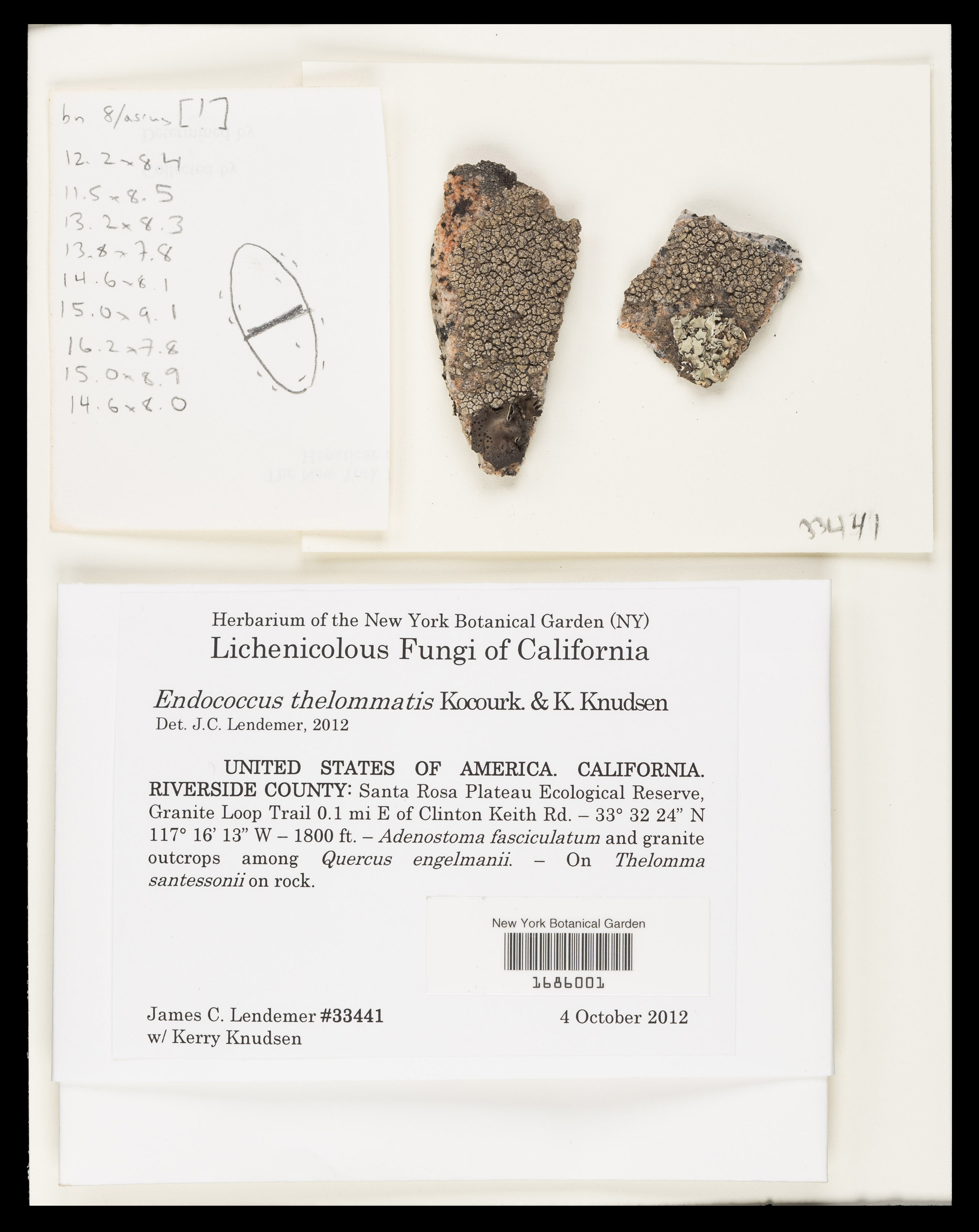
- Image of holotype specimen

Scientific classification
- Kingdom: Fungi
- Division: Ascomycota
- Class: Dothideomycetes
- Order: Lichenotheliales
- Family: Lichenotheliaceae
- Genus: Endococcus
- Species: E. thelommatis

Binomial name
- Endococcus thelommatis Kocourk. & K.Knudsen (2011)

= Endococcus thelommatis =

Species of fungus

Endococcus thelommatis is a species of lichenicolous (lichen-dwelling) fungus in the family Lichenotheliaceae. It was formally described as a new species in 2011 by the lichenologists Jana Kocourková and Kerry Knudsen. The fungus grows on the lichen Thelomma santessonii, a common saxicolous (rock-dwelling), crustose lichen that is endemic to the coast and islands of Southern California and Mexico's Baja California. Endococcus thelommatis is the first lichenicolous fungus to have been reported from this lichen.
