= Lepraria gelida =

Scientific classification
- Domain: Eukaryota
- Kingdom: Fungi
- Division: Ascomycota
- Class: Lecanoromycetes
- Order: Lecanorales
- Family: Stereocaulaceae
- Genus: Lepraria
- Species: L. gelida

Binomial name
- Lepraria gelida Tønsberg & Zhurb. (2006)

Species of lichen

Lepraria gelida is a species of leprose lichen in the family Stereocaulaceae. It occurs in Greenland, Svalbard and the Russian Arctic islands, where it grows on soil, mosses and sometimes lichens, and rarely on bark.

== Taxonomy ==
Lepraria gelida was described by the lichenologists Tor Tønsberg and Mikhail Zhurbenko in 2006. The holotype specimen was collected by Tønsberg on 5 July 2002 in Svalbard, Spitsbergen, southeast of Wijdefjorden, in the west-facing foothills of Finlandsveggen. Found at an elevation of 20–30 m, it was growing on soil in Dryas octopetala heath. The specimen, designated Tønsberg 31049, is deposited at the herbarium of the University Museum of Bergen (BG).

== Description ==
Lepraria gelida forms a leprose thallus that ranges from powdery to cottony in texture. The margin varies from diffuse to delimited, and lobes are usually absent. The medulla is present and thick, rarely thin, appearing white in colour. The thallus surface sometimes lacks soredia in places, exposing the medulla. When present, the soredia are abundant to sparse, varying in size but mostly measuring 65–100 (sometimes up to 200) micrometres in diameter. Projecting hyphae are present and range from short to medium in length. The species is chemically characterised by containing both alectorialic and porphyrilic acids. Spot tests show K+ (yellow or orange), C−, KC+ (red), and Pd+ (yellow or orange).

=== Similar species ===
Lepraria gelida closely resembles Lepraria chileana, as both species have an aggregate thallus and produce similar secondary metabolites. However, L. gelida is distinguished by its alpina-type aggregate thallus and larger granules, measuring 65–100(–200) μm in diameter, whereas L. chileana has a caesioalba-type aggregate thallus with smaller granules (27.5–40 μm). Their distributions also differ, as L. chileana only occurs in Chile.

== Habitat and distribution ==
The species grows on soil, mosses and sometimes lichens, rarely occurring on bark. It is found in open habitats and has been recorded from Greenland, Svalbard and the Russian Arctic islands near the Taimyr peninsula.
