= Stereocaulon klondikense =

Scientific classification
- Domain: Eukaryota
- Kingdom: Fungi
- Division: Ascomycota
- Class: Lecanoromycetes
- Order: Lecanorales
- Family: Stereocaulaceae
- Genus: Stereocaulon
- Species: S. klondikense

Binomial name
- Stereocaulon klondikense T. Sprib.

Species of lichen

Stereocaulon klondikense is a fruticose, rock-dwelling lichen discovered from Alaska. It is normally found in the alpine, especially on the tops of boulders used as bird perches with Gowardia nigricans and Sphaerophorus fragilis.
