= Stereocaulon arcticum =

Conservation status
- Vulnerable (NatureServe)

Scientific classification
- Kingdom: Fungi
- Division: Ascomycota
- Class: Lecanoromycetes
- Order: Lecanorales
- Family: Stereocaulaceae
- Genus: Stereocaulon
- Species: S. arcticum

Binomial name
- Stereocaulon arcticum Lynge

Species of lichen

Stereocaulon arcticum is a species of snow lichen belonging to the family Stereocaulaceae.

== Ecology ==
Stereocaulon arcticum is a known host to the lichenicolous fungus species:

- Arthonia stereocaulina
- Lasiosphaeriopsis stereocaulicola
- Opegrapha stereocaulicola
- Sphaerellothecium stereocaulorum
