= Arthonia stereocaulina =

Scientific classification
- Domain: Eukaryota
- Kingdom: Fungi
- Division: Ascomycota
- Class: Arthoniomycetes
- Order: Arthoniales
- Family: Arthoniaceae
- Genus: Arthonia
- Species: A. stereocaulina

Binomial name
- Arthonia stereocaulina (Ohlert) R.Sant. (1993)

Synonyms
- Arthonia nephromaria var. stereocaulina Ohlert; Arthonia nephromiaria var. stereocaulina Ohlert; Conida fuscopurpurea f. stereocaulina (Ohlert) Keissl.; Conida nephromiaria var. stereocaulina (Ohlert) Arnold

Species of lichen

Arthonia stereocaulina is a species of lichenicolous fungus in the family Arthoniaceae.

== Distribution ==
Arthonia stereocaulina has been reported from Alaska, Canada, Iceland, Russia and Svalbard.

== Host species ==
As the name suggests, Arthonia stereocaulina infects lichens of the genus Stereocaulon. Known host species are:

- Stereocaulon alpinum
- Stereocaulon arcticum
- Stereocaulon botryosum
- Stereocaulon capitellatum
- Stereocaulon depressum
- Stereocaulon glareosum
- Stereocaulon groenlandicum
- Stereocaulon intermedium
- Stereocaulon myriocarpum
- Stereocaulon paschale
- Stereocaulon rivulorum
- Stereocaulon saxatile
- Stereocaulon tomentosum
