= Xyleborus =

Xyleborus may refer to:

- Xyleborus (beetle), a genus of bark beetles
- Xyleborus (lichen), a genus of lichens
