= Endococcus hafellneri =

Scientific classification
- Domain: Eukaryota
- Kingdom: Fungi
- Division: Ascomycota
- Class: Dothideomycetes
- Order: Lichenotheliales
- Family: Lichenotheliaceae
- Genus: Endococcus
- Species: E. hafellneri

Binomial name
- Endococcus hafellneri (Zhurb.) Zhurb. (2019)

Synonyms
- Stigmidium hafellneri Zhurb. (2009)

Species of lichen

Endococcus hafellneri is a species of lichenicolous (lichen-eating) fungus in the family Verrucariaceae. It is found in North Asia and the Russian Far East, Estonia, and Japan, where it grows on the lobes of the lichens Flavocetraria cucullata and Cetraria islandica.

== Taxonomy ==
The fungus was formally described as a new species in 2009 by Mikhail Zhurbenko. He placed the species provisionally in the genus Stigmidium, but unlike all other species of that genus, the new fungus has coloured (brown) ascospores. The species epithet honours German lichenologist Josef Hafellner, "in recognition of his important contribution to the knowledge of lichenicolous fungi".

In 2019, Zhurbenko transferred the taxon to the Endococcus. Having had the opportunity to collect and observe more specimens, he noted the constancy of the coloured spores, and concluded that the traits of genus Endococcus are better aligned with the characteristics of the fungus.

== Description ==
Endococcus hafellneri produces ascomata with a perithecioid morphology–more or less rounded, with an ostiole. They are black and shiny and protrude slightly from the surface of the host lichen, measuring up to 50 μm in diameter. Infection by the fungus causes grey and sometimes perforated patches in the host lichen up to 6 mm (0.24 in) across, sometimes with a dark greyish-brown rim around the margin of the patch.

== Habitat and distribution ==
In Asian Russia, Endococcus hafellneri has been recorded from Buryatia, Sakha, the Magadan Oblast, and the Caucasus. It was reported from Kihnu island (Estonia) in 2015, and from Hokkaido, Japan, in 2019. Known hosts for the fungus are Flavocetraria cucullata and Cetraria islandica.
