= Stereocaulon rivulorum =

Conservation status
- Secure (NatureServe)

Scientific classification
- Kingdom: Fungi
- Division: Ascomycota
- Class: Lecanoromycetes
- Order: Lecanorales
- Family: Stereocaulaceae
- Genus: Stereocaulon
- Species: S. rivulorum

Binomial name
- Stereocaulon rivulorum H.Magn.

Species of lichen

Stereocaulon rivulorum is a species of snow lichen belonging to the family Stereocaulaceae.

== Ecology ==
Stereocaulon rivulorum is a known host to the lichenicolous fungus species:

- Arthonia stereocaulina
- Catillaria stereocaulorum
- Cercidospora stereocaulorum
- Dactylospora deminuta
- Diploschistes muscorum
- Lasiosphaeriopsis stereocaulicola
- Lichenopeltella stereocaulorum
- Licheonsticta dombrovskae
- Niesslia peltigericola
- Opegrapha stereocaulicola
- Polycoccum trypethelioides
- Rhymbocarpus stereocaulorum
- Scutula stereocaulorum
- Sphaerellothecium araneosum
- Sphaerellothecium stereocaulorum
- Taeniolella christiansenii
