= Lepraria malouina =

Scientific classification
- Kingdom: Fungi
- Division: Ascomycota
- Class: Lecanoromycetes
- Order: Lecanorales
- Family: Stereocaulaceae
- Genus: Lepraria
- Species: L. malouina

Binomial name
- Lepraria malouina Øvstedal (2012)

Species of lichen

Lepraria malouina is a species of leprose lichen in the family Ramalinaceae. Found on the Falkland Islands, it was described as a new species in 2012 by Dag Øvstedal. It contains both usnic acid and stictic acid as its main secondary metabolites (lichen products).
