= Xyleborus sporodochifer =

Scientific classification
- Kingdom: Fungi
- Division: Ascomycota
- Class: Lecanoromycetes
- Order: Lecanorales
- Family: Stereocaulaceae
- Genus: Xyleborus
- Species: X. sporodochifer

Binomial name
- Xyleborus sporodochifer R.C.Harris & Ladd (2007)

Species of lichen

Xyleborus sporodochifer is a species of lichen in the family Stereocaulaceae, and the type species of the genus Xyleborus. It was first reported in 2007, and found in the Ozarks of Missouri.
