= Lepraria chileana =

Scientific classification
- Kingdom: Fungi
- Division: Ascomycota
- Class: Lecanoromycetes
- Order: Lecanorales
- Family: Stereocaulaceae
- Genus: Lepraria
- Species: L. chileana

Binomial name
- Lepraria chileana Grewe, Barcenas-Peña, R.Diaz & Lumbsch (2021)

Species of lichen-forming fungus

Lepraria chileana is a species of leprose lichen-forming fungus in the family Stereocaulaceae. It was described as a new species in 2021 by Felix Grewe, Alejandrina Bárcenas-Peña, Rudy Díaz, and H. Thorsten Lumbsch. The species epithet refers to Chile, the country where it was collected. In the authors' phylogenetic analysis, Lepraria nivalis was recovered as the closest relative of L. chileana.

Lepraria chileana has a powdery, clumped body (thallus) of the caesioalba-type, about 0.2 mm thick and off-white to pale yellowish green in color. The fungal threads (hyphae) are colorless (hyaline), about 2.5 μm wide, and divided by cross-walls (septate), with no developed basal mat (hypothallus) and only occasional root-like anchoring threads (rhizohyphae). The granules are roughly spherical, compact, and 27.5–40 μm in diameter. The algal partner (photobiont) is a green coccoid alga with rounded cells 7.5–10 μm in diameter. The reported secondary metabolites (chemical compounds) are alectorialic acid and porphyrilic acid. The species was distinguished from the similar L. gelida by its caesioalba-type thallus and smaller granules, whereas L. gelida has an alpina-type thallus and larger granules. It was also compared with L. nivalis, which differs in having a rosette-like (placodioid) finckii-type thallus, much larger granules, and different chemistry.

The known range of Lepraria chileana is restricted to Chile. It has been collected in coastal rainforest on soil in Chiloé National Park on Chiloé Island, and in beech forest on bark on Navarino Island.
