= Stereocaulon grande =

Conservation status
- Secure (NatureServe)

Scientific classification
- Kingdom: Fungi
- Division: Ascomycota
- Class: Lecanoromycetes
- Order: Lecanorales
- Family: Stereocaulaceae
- Genus: Stereocaulon
- Species: S. grande

Binomial name
- Stereocaulon grande (H.Magn.) H.Magn. (1932)

Synonyms
- Stereocaulon paschale var. grande H.Magn. (1927)

Species of lichen

Stereocaulon grande is a species of snow lichen belonging to the family Stereocaulaceae.

== Ecology ==
Stereocaulon grande is a known host to the lichenicolous fungus species:

- Catillaria stereocaulorum
- Endococcus nanellus
- Polycoccum trypethelioides
