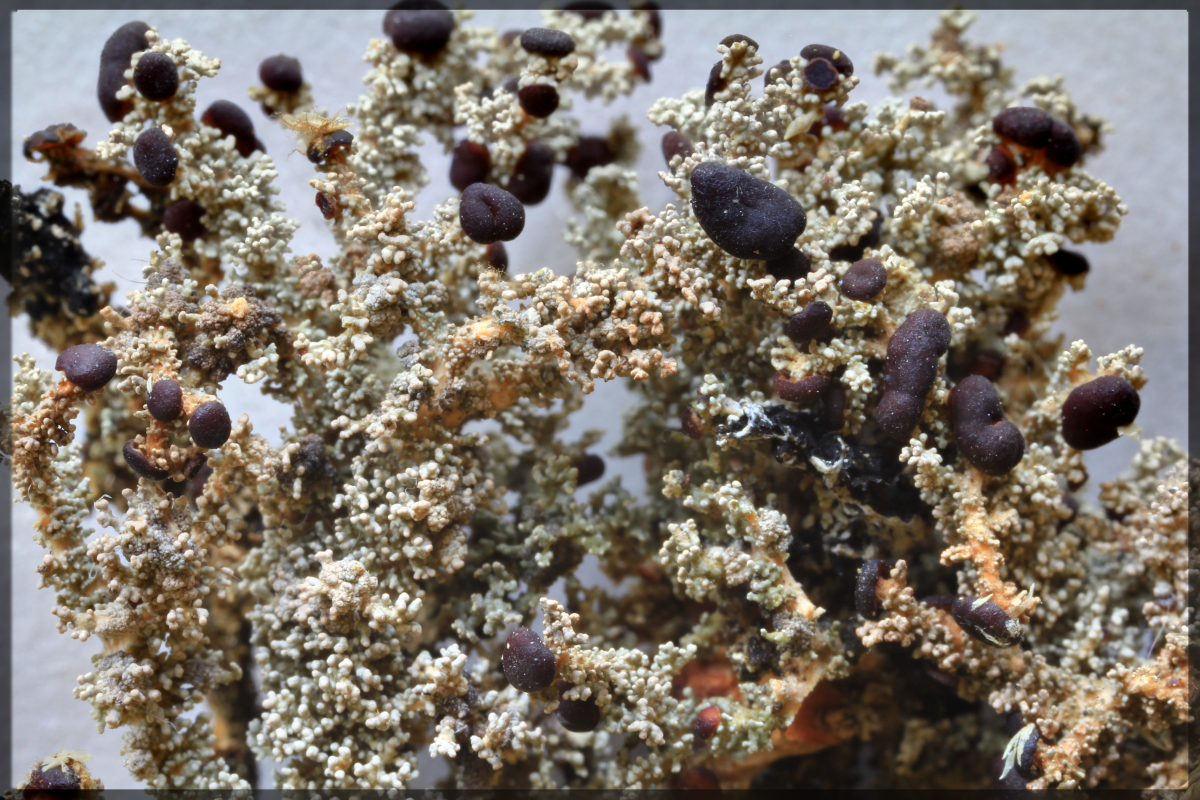

Conservation status
- Secure (NatureServe)

Scientific classification
- Kingdom: Fungi
- Division: Ascomycota
- Class: Lecanoromycetes
- Order: Lecanorales
- Family: Stereocaulaceae
- Genus: Stereocaulon
- Species: S. dactylophyllum

Binomial name
- Stereocaulon dactylophyllum Flörke (1819)

Synonyms
- List: Stereocaulon coralloides Fr. (1825); Stereocaulon coralloides var. dactylophyllum (Flörke) Th.Fr. (1860); Stereocaulon coralloides var. occidentale H.Magn. (1926); Stereocaulon coralloides a dactylophyllum (Flörke) Th.Fr. (1857); Stereocaulon dactylophyllum var. occidentale (H.Magn.) Grummann (1963); Stereocaulon paschale f. coralloides (Fr.) Linds. (1867); Stereocaulon paschale var. dactylophyllum (Flörke) Branth & Rostr. (1869)

= Stereocaulon dactylophyllum =

Species of lichen

Stereocaulon dactylophyllum is a species of saxicolous (rock-dwelling), fruticose lichen in the family Stereocaulaceae. It was first scientifically described by Heinrich Gustav Flörke in 1819. Flörke mentions that the original specimens were collected in 1797 on mossy rocks at the Rehberger Graben and near Sankt Andreasberg on the Harz Mountains, and also on the Fichtel Mountains. It is now known to be widely distributed, having been recorded in Asia, Europe, Greenland, eastern Canada, and the eastern and central United States.

The lichen is characterised morphologically by the coralloid, highly branched phyllocladia. Chemically, it contains lichen products in the stictic acid complex, including atranorin, norstictic acid, and cryptostictic acid. The expected results of chemical spot tests are K+ (yellow) and PD+ (orange).
