= Stereocaulon glareosum =

Conservation status
- Secure (NatureServe)

Scientific classification
- Kingdom: Fungi
- Division: Ascomycota
- Class: Lecanoromycetes
- Order: Lecanorales
- Family: Stereocaulaceae
- Genus: Stereocaulon
- Species: S. glareosum

Binomial name
- Stereocaulon glareosum (Savicz) H.Magn. (1926)

Synonyms
- Stereocaulon tomentosum f. glareosum Savicz (1914)

Species of lichen-forming fungus

Stereocaulon glareosum is a species of snow lichen belonging to the family Stereocaulaceae.

== Habitat and distribution ==
In Nepal, Stereocaulon glareosum has been reported from 4,200 to 4,400 m elevation in a compilation of published records; this reported range extends above the tree line used in the study.

== Ecology ==
Stereocaulon glareosum is a known host to the lichenicolous fungus species:

- Arthonia stereocaulina
- Cercidospora stereocaulorum
- Endococcus nanellus
- Lasiosphaeriopsis stereocaulicola
- Lichenosticta dombrocskae
- Merismatium decolorans
- Polycoccum trypethelioides
- Rhymbocarpus stereocaulorum
- Scutula stereocaulorum
- Taeniolella christiansenii
