= Lichenopeltella stereocaulorum =

Scientific classification
- Domain: Eukaryota
- Kingdom: Fungi
- Division: Ascomycota
- Class: Dothideomycetes
- Order: Microthyriales
- Family: Microthyriaceae
- Genus: Lichenopeltella
- Species: L. stereocaulorum

Binomial name
- Lichenopeltella stereocaulorum Zhurb. (2010)

Species of fungus

Lichenopeltella stereocaulorum is a species of lichenicolous fungus belonging to the class Dothideomycetes. It was described in 2010 from an infected specimen of Stereocaulon botryosum.

It has a similar appearance to Lichenopeltella cladoniarum but L. stereocaulorum has smaller spores and infects Stereocaulon species, while L. cladoniarum typically infects species of the Cladoniaceae and Physciaceae families.

== Distribution and habitat ==
Lichenipeltella stereocaulorum has a Holarctic distribution in the tundra biome, although it has also been reported from Arctic desert and taiga. It is known from Russia and Canada.

== Pathogenicity and host species ==
Lichenopeltella stereocaulorum infects the stems of Stereocaulon lichens, most commonly at the base of the stem. The following species are known hosts to Lichenopeltella sterecaulorum:

- Stereocaulon alpinum
- Stereocaulon botryosum
- Stereocaulon depressum
- Stereocaulon groenlandicum
- Stereocaulon paschale
- Stereocaulon rivulorum

It causes no known symptoms of infection in the host.
