= Endococcus =

Scientific classification
- Domain: Eukaryota
- Kingdom: Fungi
- Division: Ascomycota
- Class: Dothideomycetes
- Order: Lichenotheliales
- Family: Lichenotheliaceae
- Genus: Endococcus; Nyl. (1855)

Type species
- Endococcus rugulosus (Borrer ex Leight.) Nyl. (1855)

Species
- See text

Genus of fungi

Endococcus is a genus of lichenicolous (lichen-dwelling) in the family Lichenotheliaceae. It has 44 species. The genus was circumscribed by the Finnish botanist William Nylander in 1855. Although at least one source places the genus in the Verrucariaceae, a 2016 study of the type species, Endococcus rugulosus, determined that it should instead be placed in the family Lichenotheliaceae of the order Dothideales; this classification echoes a placement proposed in 1979 by David Hawksworth.

== Species ==
- Endococcus alectoriae (D.Hawksw.) D.Hawksw. (1979)
- Endococcus apicicola (J.Steiner) R.Sant. (1994)
- Endococcus brachysporus (Zopf) M.Brand & Diederich (1999)
- Endococcus caudisporus J.C.David & Etayo (1995)
- Endococcus cladiae Zhurb. & Pino-Bodas (2015)
- Endococcus exerrans Nyl. (1879)
- Endococcus freyi Hafellner (2019)
- Endococcus fusiger Th.Fr. & Almq. (1867)
- Endococcus hafellneri (Zhurb.) Zhurb. (2019)
- Endococcus hafellnerianus Motiej., Suija & Kantvilas (2019)
- Endococcus incrassatus Etayo & Breuss (2001)
- Endococcus janae K.Knudsen (2008)
- Endococcus karlstadtensis Kocourk. & Brackel (2006)
- Endococcus macrosporus (Hepp ex Arnold) Nyl. (1880)
- Endococcus matzeri D.Hawksw. & Iturr. (2006)
- Endococcus nanellus Ohlert (1870)
- Endococcus oreinae Hafellner (2002)
- Endococcus oropogonicola Etayo (2002)
- Endococcus pallidosporus Etayo (2008)
- Endococcus parentium Etayo (2008)
- Endococcus parmeliarum Etayo (2008)
- Endococcus peltigericola Zhurb. & Stepanch. (2012)
- Endococcus perminutus Nyl. ex Vain. (1878)
- Endococcus physciae Y.Joshi (2018)
- Endococcus propinquus (Körb.) Trevis. (1860)
- Endococcus protoblasteniae Diederich (1999)
- Endococcus pseudocyphellariae Etayo (2008)
- Endococcus ramalinarius (Linds.) D.Hawksw. (1979)
- Endococcus rugulosus Nyl. (1855)
- Endococcus sardous Brackel (2019)
- Endococcus sendtneri (Arnold) Hafellner (2008)
- Endococcus sipmanii Etayo (2017)
- Endococcus thamnoliae Etayo (2010)
- Endococcus thelommatis Kocourk. & K.Knudsen (2011)
- Endococcus tricolorans Alstrup (1993)
- Endococcus umbilicariae (Linds.) Hafellner (2019)
- Endococcus variabilis Halıcı, Kocourk. & Diederich (2007)
- Endococcus verrucisporus Alstrup (1994)
- Endococcus verrucosus Hafellner (1994)
- Endococcus xanthoparmeliae Y.Joshi, S.Y.Kondr., Lőkös & Hur (2015)
- Endococcus zahlbrucknerellae (Henssen) D.Hawksw. (1979)
