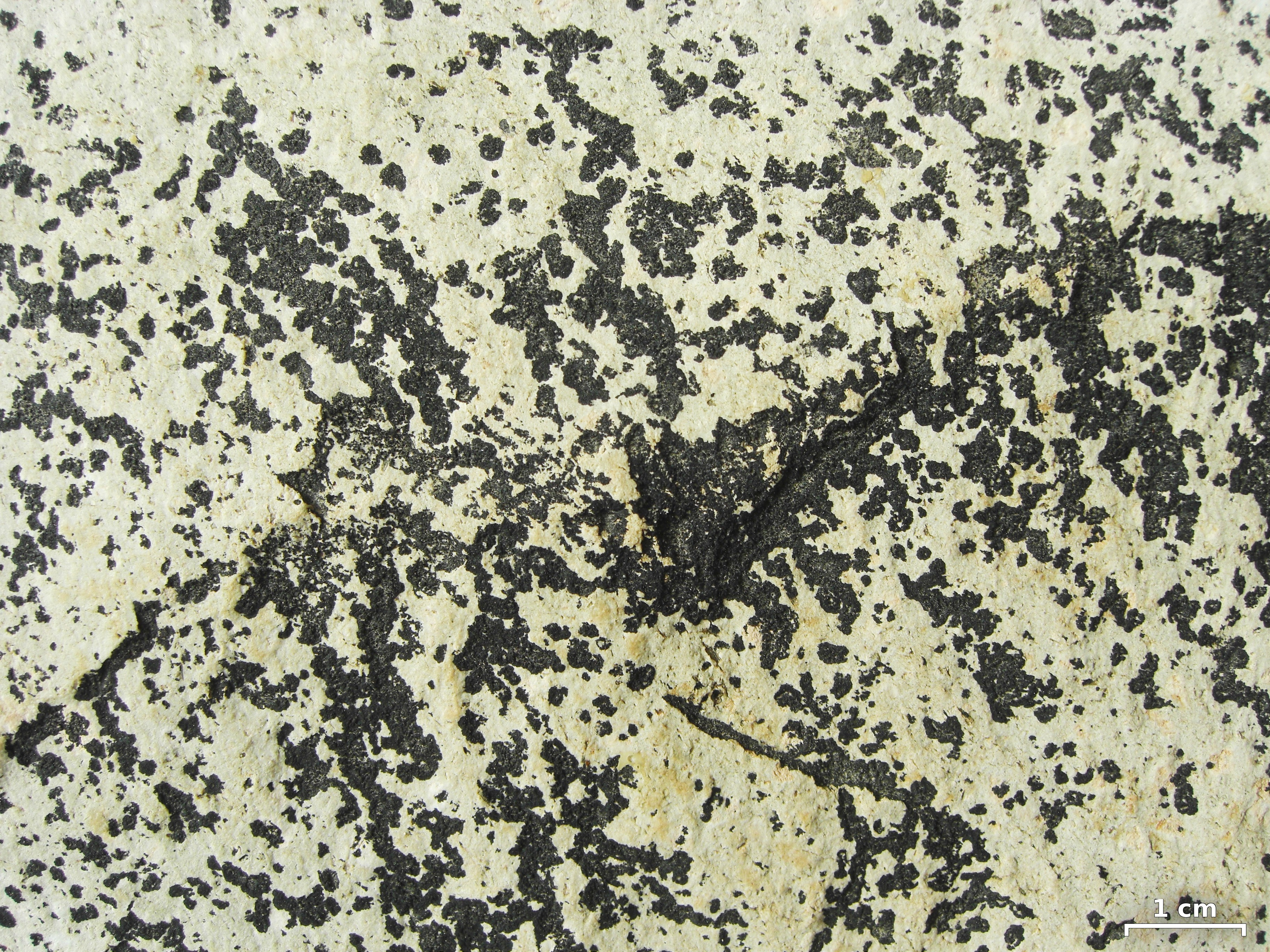
- Lichenothelia sp.

Scientific classification
- Kingdom: Fungi
- Division: Ascomycota
- Class: Dothideomycetes
- Order: Lichenotheliales
- Family: Lichenotheliaceae
- Genus: Lichenothelia; D.Hawksw. (1981)

Type species
- Lichenothelia scopularia (Nyl. D.Hawksw. (1981)

Synonyms
- Anzia Garov. (1868)

= Lichenothelia =

Genus of fungi

Lichenothelia is a genus of fungi in the family Lichenotheliaceae. The genus was established in 1981 by David L. Hawksworth and includes 13 recognised species. These fungi form thin black crusts on rocks and other surfaces, producing distinctive dome-shaped fruiting bodies that eventually develop a dish-like depression in the centre. The genus represents the type of its own order, Lichenotheliales, which was created to accommodate these and related rock-dwelling fungi.

== Taxonomy ==
The genus Lichenothelia was introduced by David L. Hawksworth in 1981 as a new name for the so-called Microthelia aterrima species group after studies showed that this assemblage is unrelated to the bark-dwelling (corticolous) fungi traditionally treated in Microthelia. Earlier attempts to segregate the group—such as Santo Garovaglio's illegitimate Anzia (1868) and Edvard Vainio's later, non-typical use of Microthelia—are regarded as nomenclaturally invalid, and both are listed as synonyms of Lichenothelia.

Hawksworth selected Lichenothelia scopularia (originally Verrucaria scopularia) as the type species, and he accepted two members in the genus: L. scopularia and L. metzleri. He also noted a third, as-yet undescribed North-American taxon displaying a slightly different development. The two described species differ mainly in ascospore size, septation and iodine reactions of the ascus wall.

The systematic placement of Lichenothelia was initially uncertain. Hawksworth observed that ascus structure shows features of both the Lecanorales and the Dothideales, suggesting the genus may represent an evolutionary link between these lineages. Developmental studies by Henssen and Jahns led them to assign the group provisionally to the Dothideales (family Mycoporaceae), whereas other species formerly held in Microthelia were transferred to the Pleosporales.

In a major revision of the Dothideomycetes, Knudsen, Muggia and Hyde erected the new order Lichenotheliales to accommodate Lichenothelia as its type genus. The order encompasses fungi that are either non-lichenised or live on existing lichens. They occur epiphytically on plant surfaces, grow endolithically within rock, or sit on the surface of other lichens. All members produce double-walled (bitunicate) asci—often turning blue in the K/I test—formed either in perithecioid, ostiolate ascomata or in non-ostiolate stromata. It differs from the superficially similar Lichenostigmales (Arthoniomycetes) in having a hamathecium and in containing several rock-dwelling species that are not lichenicolous.

== Description ==
Lichenothelia produces a thin, crust-forming thallus that is black, often cracked into areoles, and apparently devoid of any true lichenisation, although the fungus may occur loosely alongside various algal cells. From this crust arise solitary ascostromata. These fruiting bodies begin as convex to hemispherical domes composed of tightly packed pseudoparenchymatous cells whose outer wall matches the thallus in texture and deep brown-to-black colour. As the stroma matures, the tissue above the spore-bearing layer dissolves to create a central, dish-like depression; the resulting structure resembles a lecideine apothecium edged by a swollen, black margin.

Inside each stroma, short-celled, irregularly branched pseudoparaphyses persist among the developing asci creating a dense, interwoven hamathecium. The asci are fissitunicate and broadly club-shaped to almost cylindrical; they arise on brief stalks, have markedly thick walls—especially near the apex—and contain eight ascospores arranged in two rows (they are biseriate). When young, the outer coat of the ascus may stain deep blue in iodine, and a small internal beak is visible near the apex.

The spores themselves are ellipsoidal to soleiform, rounded at the ends, and divided by one to three transverse septa (occasionally appearing somewhat muriform). They are slightly to clearly pinched at the median septum, range from golden to dark brown when mature, and have walls that are smooth to finely warted. A conspicuous gelatinous perispore surrounds each spore and swells markedly in potassium hydroxide solution. No asexual morph has been observed, and all standard chemical spot tests yield negative reactions.

== Species ==
- Lichenothelia antarctica Øvstedal (2001)
- Lichenothelia arida Muggia, Kocourk. & K.Knudsen (2015)
- Lichenothelia convexa Henssen (1987)
- Lichenothelia ilamensis Valadb., M.Schultz & Brackel (2016)
- Lichenothelia iranica Valadb., M.Schultz & Brackel (2016)
- Lichenothelia muriformis Ametrano, K.Knudsen, Kocourk. & Muggia (2019)
- Lichenothelia papilliformis Ametrano, K.Knudsen, Kocourk. & Muggia (2019)
- Lichenothelia renobalesiana D.Hawksw. & V.Atienza (2008)
- Lichenothelia rugosa (G.Thor) Ertz & Diederich (2014)
- Lichenothelia scopularia (Nyl.) D.Hawksw. (1981)
- Lichenothelia spiratispora Etayo (2010)
- Lichenothelia umbrophila Muggia, Kocourk. & K.Knudsen (2015)
- Lichenothelia uralensis Zhurb. (2008)
