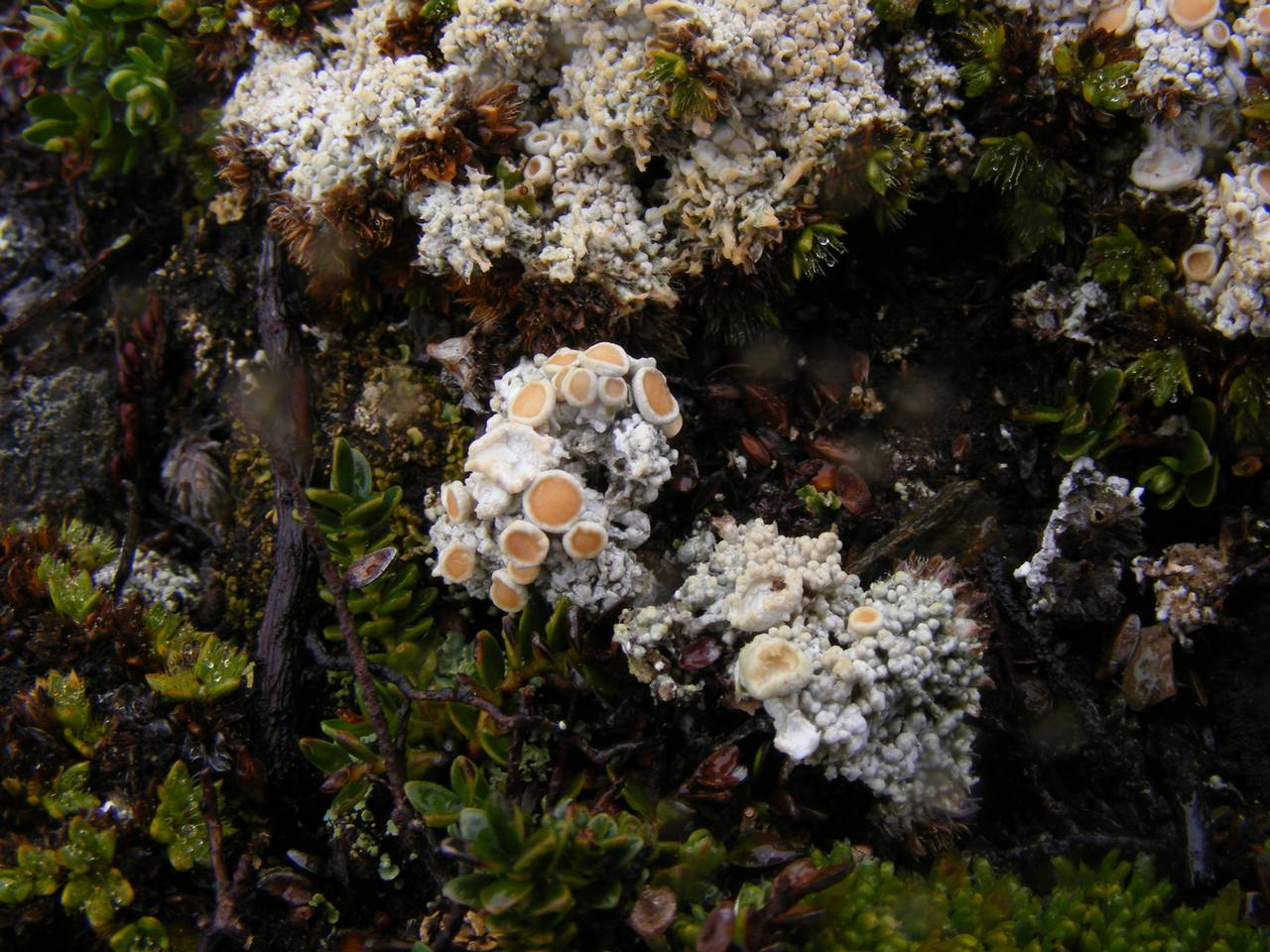

Conservation status
- Secure (NatureServe)

Scientific classification
- Kingdom: Fungi
- Division: Ascomycota
- Class: Lecanoromycetes
- Order: Pertusariales
- Family: Ochrolechiaceae
- Genus: Ochrolechia
- Species: O. frigida

Binomial name
- Ochrolechia frigida (Sw.) Lynge (1928)

Synonyms
- List: Isidium gonatodes (Ach.) Ach.; Lecanora tartarea var. frigida (Sw.) Ach.; Lecanora tartarea var. gonatodes (Ach.) Ach.; Lichen frigidus Sw.; Lichen gonatodes Ach.; Lichen tartareus var. frigidus (Sw.) Wahlenb.; Lichen tartareus var. gonatodes (Ach.) Wahlenb.; Ochrolechia elisabethae-kolae Verseghy; Ochrolechia frigida f. gonatodes (Ach.) Lynge; Ochrolechia frigida var. gonatodes (Ach.); Ochrolechia gonatodes (Ach.) Räsänen; Ochrolechia pterulina (Nyl.) G.E.Howard; Ochrolechia tartarea var. frigida (Sw.) Körb.; Ochrolechia tartarea var. gonatodes (Ach.) Vain.; Ochrolechia tartarea var. grandiosa (Ach.) Arnold; Ochrolechia tartarea var. thelephoroides (Th.Fr.) Arnold; Parmelia tartarea var. frigida (Sw.) Ach.; Parmelia tartarea var. gonatodes (Ach.) Ach.; Psora frigida (Sw.) Hoffm.; Rinodina frigida (Sw.) Gray

= Ochrolechia frigida =

Species of lichen

Ochrolechia frigida is a species of lichen belonging to the family Ochrolechiaceae. It was first formally described by Olof Peter Swartz in 1781, as Lichen frigidus. Bernt Arne Lynge transferred it to Ochrolechia in 1928.

== Description ==
Ochrolechia frigida is characterised by a thallus (the main body of the lichen) that is white to very pale grey in colour, often with a yellowish tinge. The thallus initially forms as a very thin warted crust that quickly develops distinctive small, smooth, spine- or papilla-like extensions reaching up to 1.5 mm in length. These extensions eventually become coralloid (coral-like) in appearance. The lichen frequently forms extensive crusts that grow over low vegetation, other lichens, mosses, and plant stems.

Apothecia (fruiting bodies) are rarely produced in this species. When present, they measure up to 5 mm in diameter, occasionally reaching 7 mm, and are sessile (attached directly to the thallus without a stalk). The disc of the apothecium is concave to flat in shape, pale brown or red-brown in colour, and lacks pruina (a powdery or waxy coating). The thalline exciple (the rim around the disc containing algal cells) is relatively thin, smooth, and entire (without breaks or divisions). The ascospores (sexual spores produced in asci) measure 25–40 by 15–26 micrometres.

Chemical spot tests show that the thallus is C+ (red), KC+ (red), K–, Pd–, and UV–. These reactions indicate the presence of gyrophoric acid and sometimes lecanoric acid.

== Habitat, distribution, and ecology ==
In the United Kingdom, this lichen species grows primarily among mosses and spreads over low-growing vegetation on high moorlands and mountain summits. It occasionally appears on coastal heathlands, though this habitat is uncommon for the species. It occurs frequently throughout Scotland and extends southward into northern England and the Snowdonia region of Wales.

Ochrolechia frigida is a known host species to several lichenicolous fungus species: Sphaerellothecium araneosum, Weddellomyces tartaricola, Geltingia associata, and Lichenostigma alpinum.
