= Eilifdahlia =

Scientific classification
- Domain: Eukaryota
- Kingdom: Fungi
- Division: Ascomycota
- Class: Lecanoromycetes
- Order: Teloschistales
- Family: Teloschistaceae
- Genus: Eilifdahlia; S.Y.Kondr., Kärnefelt, Elix, A.Thell & Hur (2014)

Type species
- Eilifdahlia dahlii (Elix, S.Y.Kondr. & Kärnefelt) S.Y.Kondr., Kärnefelt, Elix, A.Thell, J.Kim, A.S.Kondr. & J.S.Hur (2014)

Species
- E. dahlii E. sergeyana E. wirthii

Genus of lichens

Eilifdahlia is a genus of lichen-forming fungi in the family Teloschistaceae. It contains three species of corticolous (bark-dwelling), crustose lichens that occur in the Southern Hemisphere.

== Taxonomy ==
The genus was circumscribed in 2014 by lichenologists Sergey Kondratyuk, Ingvar Kärnefelt, John Alan Elix, Arne Thell, and Jae-Seoun Hur, following a molecular phylogenetics-led restructuring of the subfamily Caloplacoideae. They assigned Eilifdahlia dahlii as the type species; this species was formerly classified in the genus Caloplaca. The genus name honours Norwegian lichenologist Eilif Dahl for his "important contributions to the Australian lichen flora". Two species were included in the initial circumscription of the genus; a third was added in 2017.

== Description ==
The crust-like thallus of Eilifdahlia has a continuous to patchy appearance, typically ranging in colour from white to greyish white. Its surface layer is organized in a cellular structure known as paraplectenchymatous. The apothecia are biatorine in form and are encased in an outer layer, the true exciple, that is either paraplectenchymatous or scleroparaplectenchymatous. Each ascus produces eight spores, which are polarilocular. The lichen also produces rod-shaped or slightly elongated rod-shaped conidia. In terms of chemical properties, the thallus does not change colour when exposed to the potassium hydroxide (K) spot test, but the apothecia turn purple. Lichen products in the genus include the dominant presence of lichexanthone and anthraquinones linked to the parietin group (or chemosyndrome), with these compounds being most concentrated in the apothecia.

== Species ==
As of October 2023, Species Fungorum (in the Catalogue of Life) accepts three species of Eilifdahlia:

- Eilifdahlia dahlii (Elix, S.Y.Kondr. & Kärnefelt) S.Y.Kondr., Kärnefelt, Elix, A.Thell, Jung Kim, A.S.Kondr. & Hur (2014) – Australia
- Eilifdahlia sergeyana (Kantvilas) S.Y.Kondr., Elix, Kärnefelt & A.Thell (2017) – South Australia
- Eilifdahlia wirthii S.Y.Kondr. (2014) – South Africa

The proposed taxon Eilifdahlia schwarzii F.Schumm & S.Y.Kondr. (2017) has since been transferred to Caloplaca as Caloplaca schwarzii.
