= Sphaerellothecium stereocaulorum =

Scientific classification
- Kingdom: Fungi
- Division: Ascomycota
- Class: Sordariomycetes
- Order: Phyllachorales
- Family: Phyllachoraceae
- Genus: Sphaerellothecium
- Species: S. stereocaulorum

Binomial name
- Sphaerellothecium stereocaulorum Zhurb. & Triebel (2008)

Species of fungus

Sphaerellothecium stereocaulorum is a species of lichenicolous fungus in the Phyllachoraceae family.

== Distribution ==
Sphaerellothecium stereocaulorum has been found in Alaska, Canada, Greenland and Iceland.

== Host species and symptoms ==
Sphaerellothecium stereocaulorum is known to infect Stereocaulon arcticum and the naked stems of Stereocaulon groenlandicum and Stereocaulon rivulorum.
