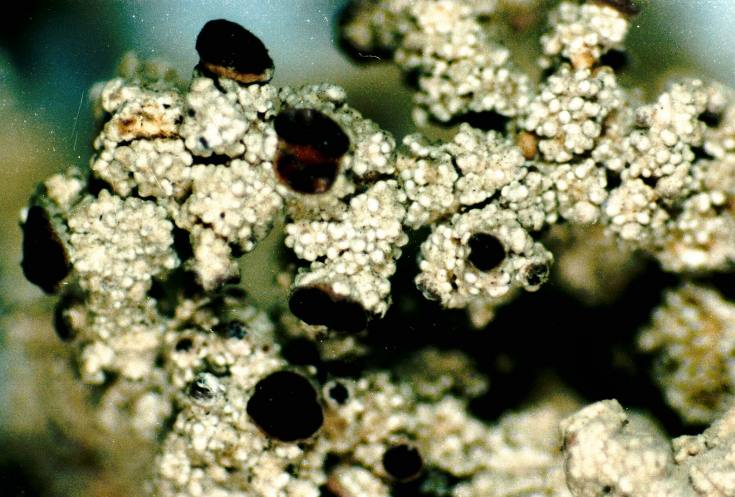

Conservation status
- Secure (NatureServe)

Scientific classification
- Kingdom: Fungi
- Division: Ascomycota
- Class: Lecanoromycetes
- Order: Lecanorales
- Family: Stereocaulaceae
- Genus: Stereocaulon
- Species: S. tomentosum

Binomial name
- Stereocaulon tomentosum Fr.

= Stereocaulon tomentosum =

Species of lichen

Stereocaulon tomentosum is a species of snow lichen belonging to the family Stereocaulaceae.

== Ecology ==
Stereocaulon tomentosum is a known host to the lichenicolous fungus species:

- Arthonia stereocaulina
- Catillaria stereocaulorum
- Endococcus nanellus
- Opegrapha stereocaulicola
- Polycoccum trypethelioides
- Stigmidium beringicum
