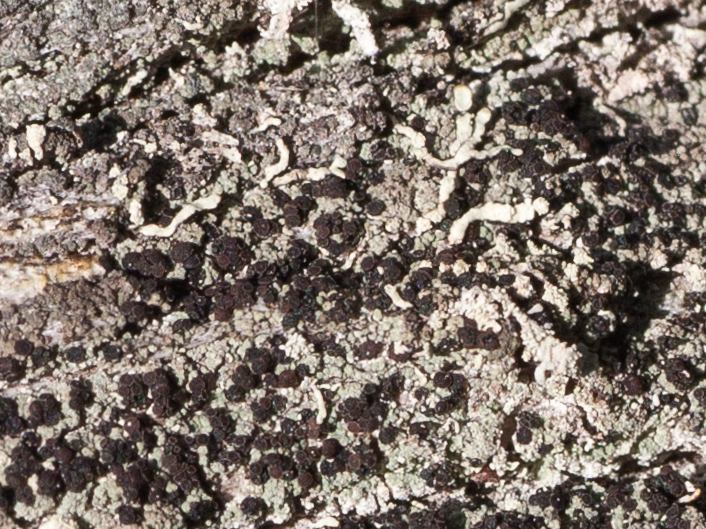
- Hertelidea botryosa

Scientific classification
- Domain: Eukaryota
- Kingdom: Fungi
- Division: Ascomycota
- Class: Lecanoromycetes
- Order: Lecanorales
- Family: Stereocaulaceae
- Genus: Hertelidea; Printzen & Kantvilas (2004)

Type species
- Hertelidea botryosa (Fr.) Printzen & Kantvilas (2004)

Species
- H. aspera H. botryosa H. eucalypti H. geophila H. pseudobotryosa H. wankaensis

= Hertelidea =

Genus of lichens in the family Stereocaulaceae

Hertelidea is a genus of crustose lichens in the family Stereocaulaceae. Characteristics of the genus include carbon-black ring or outer margin (exciple) around the fruit body disc (apothecium), eight-spored, Micarea-type asci and mostly simple, hyaline ascospores that lack a transparent outer layer. Hertelidea species mostly grow on wood, although less frequently they are found on bark or soil. While the type species, Hertelidea botryosa, has a widespread distribution, most of the other species are found only in Australia.

== Taxonomy ==
Hertelidea was circumscribed in 2004 by Christian Printzen and Gintaras Kantvilas to accommodate species that were formerly referred to as the "Lecidea botryosa" group. Four species were originally included: Hertelidea botryosa, H. eucalypti, H. geophila, and H. pseudobotryosa. H. aspera was transferred to the genus from Lecidea in 2005, while H. wankaensis was described as a new species in 2006.

The genus name honours Hannes Hertel (b.1939), a German Taxonomist and lichenologist and former Director of the Botanische Staatssammlung München, who was the subject of the Festschrift in which this species was published.

== Description ==
Hertelidea lichens have a crustose thallus that is sometimes sorediate. Their apothecia, which are often arranged in conspicuous clusters, are lecideine, meaning that they have a carbonized thin black ring (an exciple) around the cup-shaped apothecium. The paraphyses are weakly to moderately branched and anastomosing, and have pigmented, capitate tips that separate readily in KOH. The asci are eight-spored and Micarea-like, featuring a prominent, amyloid thallus that is more or less lacking an ocular chamber but is pierced by a more darkly staining tubular structure. The ascospores are simple or rarely one-septate, colourless, and non-halonate.

=== Chemistry ===
One species, H. eucalypti, contains homosekikaic acid, whereas the others contain perlatolic acid.

== Habitat and distribution ==
Species of Hertelidea are typically found on charred and rotting wood. In Australia, the logs and stumps of eucalypts are a particularly favoured substrate.

== Species ==
- Hertelidea aspera (Müll.Arg.) Kantvilas & Elix (2005) – Australia
- Hertelidea botryosa (Fr.) Printzen & Kantvilas (2004) – boreal and temperate regions in Northern Hemisphere
- Hertelidea eucalypti Kantvilas & Printzen (2004) – Australia
- Hertelidea geophila Kantvilas & Printzen (2004) – Australia
- Hertelidea pseudobotryosa R.C.Harris, Ladd & Printzen (2004) – Australia; North America
- Hertelidea wankaensis Kantvilas & Elix (2006) – Australia
