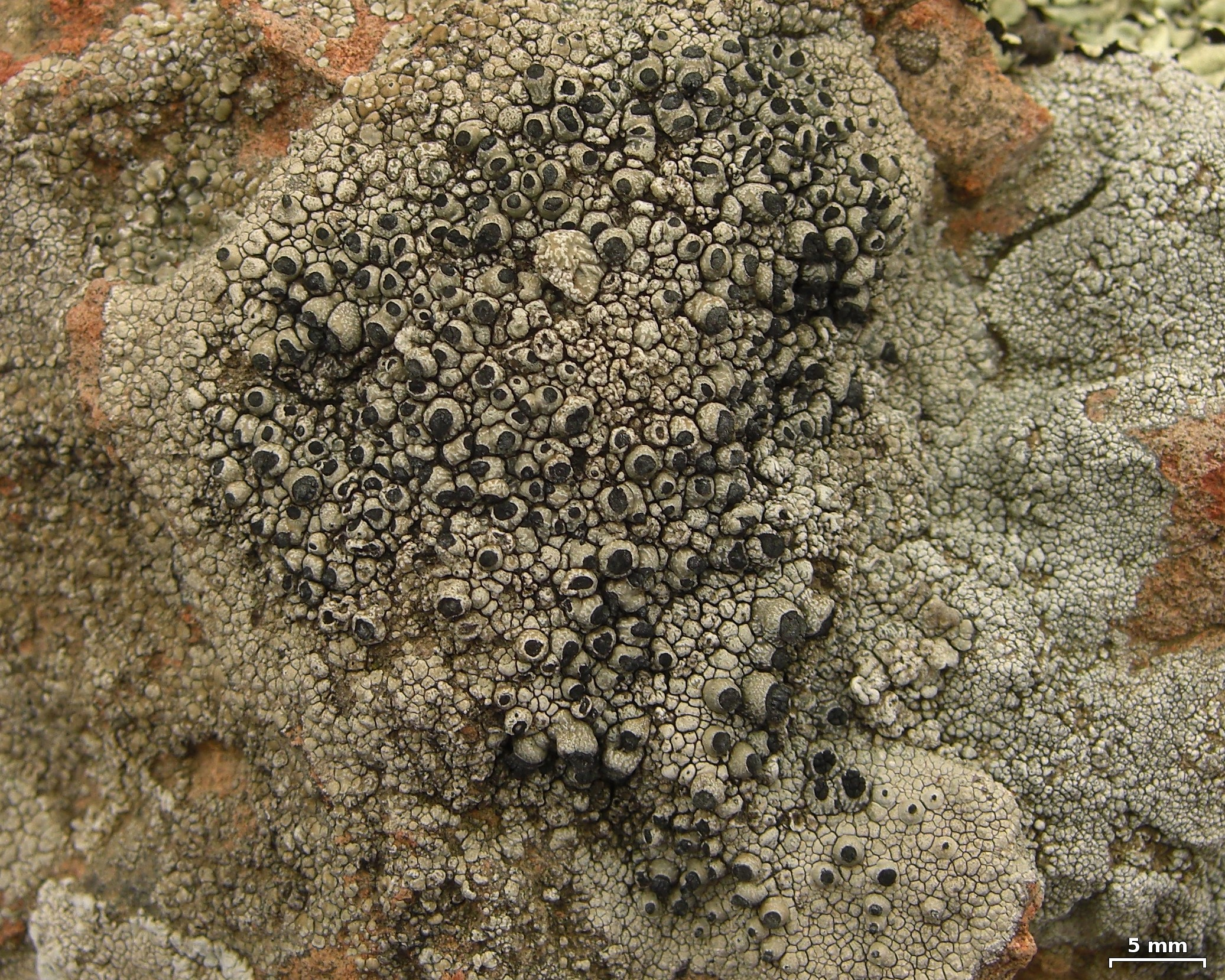

Scientific classification
- Domain: Eukaryota
- Kingdom: Fungi
- Division: Ascomycota
- Class: Lecanoromycetes
- Order: Caliciales
- Family: Caliciaceae
- Genus: Thelomma
- Species: T. santessonii

Binomial name
- Thelomma santessonii Tibell (1976)

= Thelomma santessonii =

Species of lichen

Thelomma santessonii, the tan nipple lichen, is a species of saxicolous (rock-dwelling), crustose lichen in the family Caliciaceae. Found in northern North America, it was formally described as a new species in 1976 by lichenologist Leif Tibell. It is endemic to the coast and islands of Southern California and Baja California in Mexico.

Thelomma santessonii has a yellowish tan color, and is areolate. The thallus has verrucae that measure up to 2.5 mm (0.10 in) broad. The expected results of chemical spot tests are KC− on the thallus, and K+ (red), P+ (yellow) on the mazaedia. When a long-wavelength UV light is lit on the thallus, it fluoresces a blue-white color. The ascospores of the lichen are spherical and lack any septa; they measure 14–16 μm.

Endococcus thelommatis is a lichenicolous fungus that parasitizes Thelomma santessonii.
