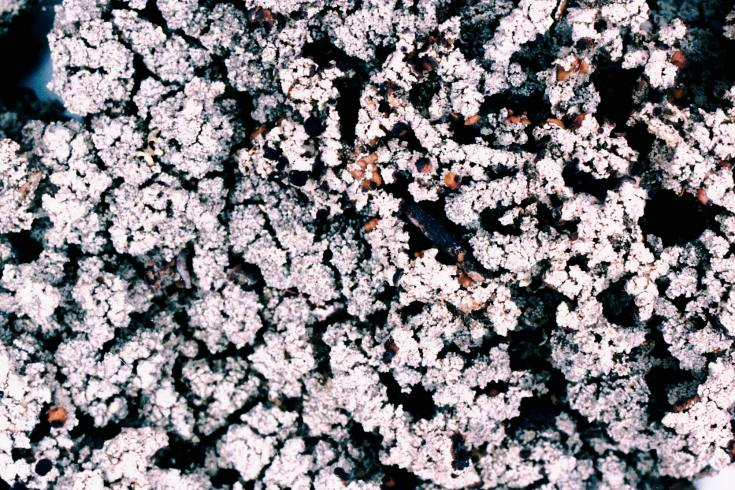

Conservation status
- Secure (NatureServe)

Scientific classification
- Kingdom: Fungi
- Division: Ascomycota
- Class: Lecanoromycetes
- Order: Lecanorales
- Family: Stereocaulaceae
- Genus: Stereocaulon
- Species: S. saxatile

Binomial name
- Stereocaulon saxatile H.Magn.

= Stereocaulon saxatile =

Species of lichen

Stereocaulon saxatile is a species of snow lichen belonging to the family Stereocaulaceae.

== Ecology ==
Stereocaulon saxatile is a known host to the lichenicolous fungus species:

- Anzina carneonivea
- Arthonia stereocaulina
- Catillaria stereocaulorum
- Endococcus nanellus
- Odontotrema stereocaulicola
- Phaeosporobolus alpinus
- Protothelenella sphinctrinoidella
- Scutula stereocaulorum
