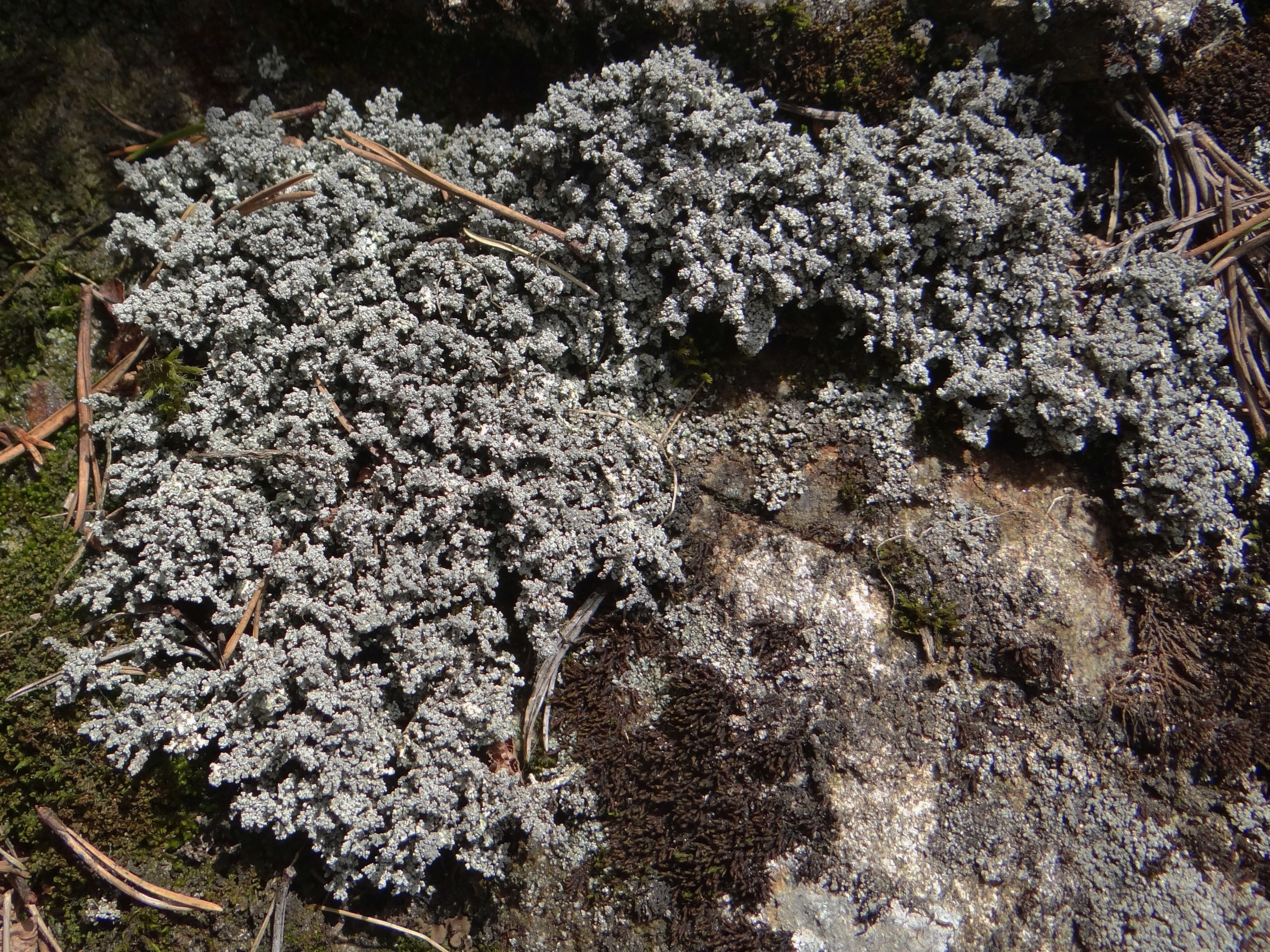

Conservation status
- Secure (NatureServe)

Scientific classification
- Kingdom: Fungi
- Division: Ascomycota
- Class: Lecanoromycetes
- Order: Lecanorales
- Family: Stereocaulaceae
- Genus: Stereocaulon
- Species: S. paschale

Binomial name
- Stereocaulon paschale (L.) Hoffm. (1796)

Synonyms
- Lichen paschalis L. (1753)

= Stereocaulon paschale =

Species of lichen-forming fungus

Stereocaulon paschale is a species of lichen belonging to the family Stereocaulaceae.

It has a cosmopolitan distribution.

In Iceland, it has the conservation status of a vulnerable species (VU).

== Ecology ==
Stereocaulon paschale is host to some lichenicolous fungi which infect various parts of the thallus. Most of these fungi have a Holarctic distribution. These fungi include:

- Arthonia stereocaulina, Infects the phyllocladia but rarely causes disease.
- Catillaria stereocaulorum, Mainly infects the phyllocladia, which can become swollen and dark. It is common in the Arctic.
- Cercidospora stereocaulorum, Infects phyllocladia and sometimes on stems, cephalodia and apothecia.
- Endococcus nanellus, Infects phyllocladia and sometimes on stems, cephalodia and apothecia. Often found in discolored apothecia but does probably not cause the discoloration.
- Lasiosphaeriopsis stereocaulicola, Usually found at the stem base which can turn brown but no other symptoms are known.
- Lichenopeltella stereocaulorum, Most often found on stems. This species was only discovered in 2010.
- Opegrapha stereocaulicola, Infects stems which may become darker.
- Phaeosporobolus alpinus, Commensal. Most commonly found on species of Pertusaria or Ochrolechia.
- Polycoccum trypethelioides, Produces galls on stem which change colour with time turning cinnamon colour or brown.

== See also ==
- List of lichens named by Carl Linnaeus
