= Sphaerellothecium gowardii =

Scientific classification
- Kingdom: Fungi
- Division: Ascomycota
- Class: Sordariomycetes
- Order: Phyllachorales
- Family: Phyllachoraceae
- Genus: Sphaerellothecium
- Species: S. gowardii

Binomial name
- Sphaerellothecium gowardii Alstrup & M.S.Cole (1998)
- Holotype: Valleyview silt cliffs, British Columbia, Canada

Species of lichen

Sphaerellothecium gowardii is a species of lichenicolous (lichen-dwelling) fungus in the family Phyllachoraceae. It was formally described as a new species in 1998 by Vagn Alstrup and Mariette Cole. The type specimen was collected by Alstrup from the Valleyview silt cliffs in Kamloops, British Columbia, Canada at an elevation of 450 m (1,480 ft), where it was found growing on Acarospora schleicheri. The fungus is parasymbiotic (a specific type of symbiotic relationship where one organism benefits from the interaction while the other organism is neither significantly harmed nor benefited) or weakly symbiotic on its lichen host. The species epithet honours the Canadian lichenologist Trevor Goward, who helped organise the August 1994 excursion in which this and several other lichenicolous fungi were discovered.
