= Stereocaulon botryosum =

Conservation status
- Apparently Secure (NatureServe)

Scientific classification
- Kingdom: Fungi
- Division: Ascomycota
- Class: Lecanoromycetes
- Order: Lecanorales
- Family: Stereocaulaceae
- Genus: Stereocaulon
- Species: S. botryosum

Binomial name
- Stereocaulon botryosum Ach.

Species of lichen

Stereocaulon botryosum is a species of snow lichen belonging to the family Stereocaulaceae.

== Ecology ==
Stereocaulon botryosum is a known host to the lichenicolous fungus species:

- Arthonia stereocaulina
- Catillaria stereocaulorum
- Cercidospora stereocaulorum
- Endococcus nanellus
- Lasiosphaeriopsis stereocaulicola
- Lichenopeltella stereocaulorum
- Opegrapha stereocaulicola
- Taeniolella christiansenii
