= Stereocaulon capitellatum =

Scientific classification
- Domain: Eukaryota
- Kingdom: Fungi
- Division: Ascomycota
- Class: Lecanoromycetes
- Order: Lecanorales
- Family: Stereocaulaceae
- Genus: Stereocaulon
- Species: S. capitellatum

Binomial name
- Stereocaulon capitellatum H.Magn.

Species of lichen

Stereocaulon capitellatum is a species of snow lichen belonging to the family Stereocaulaceae.

== Ecology ==
Stereocaulon capitellatum is a known host to the lichenicolous fungus species:

- Arthonia stereocaulina
- Opegrapha stereocaulicola
- Polycoccum trypethelioides
