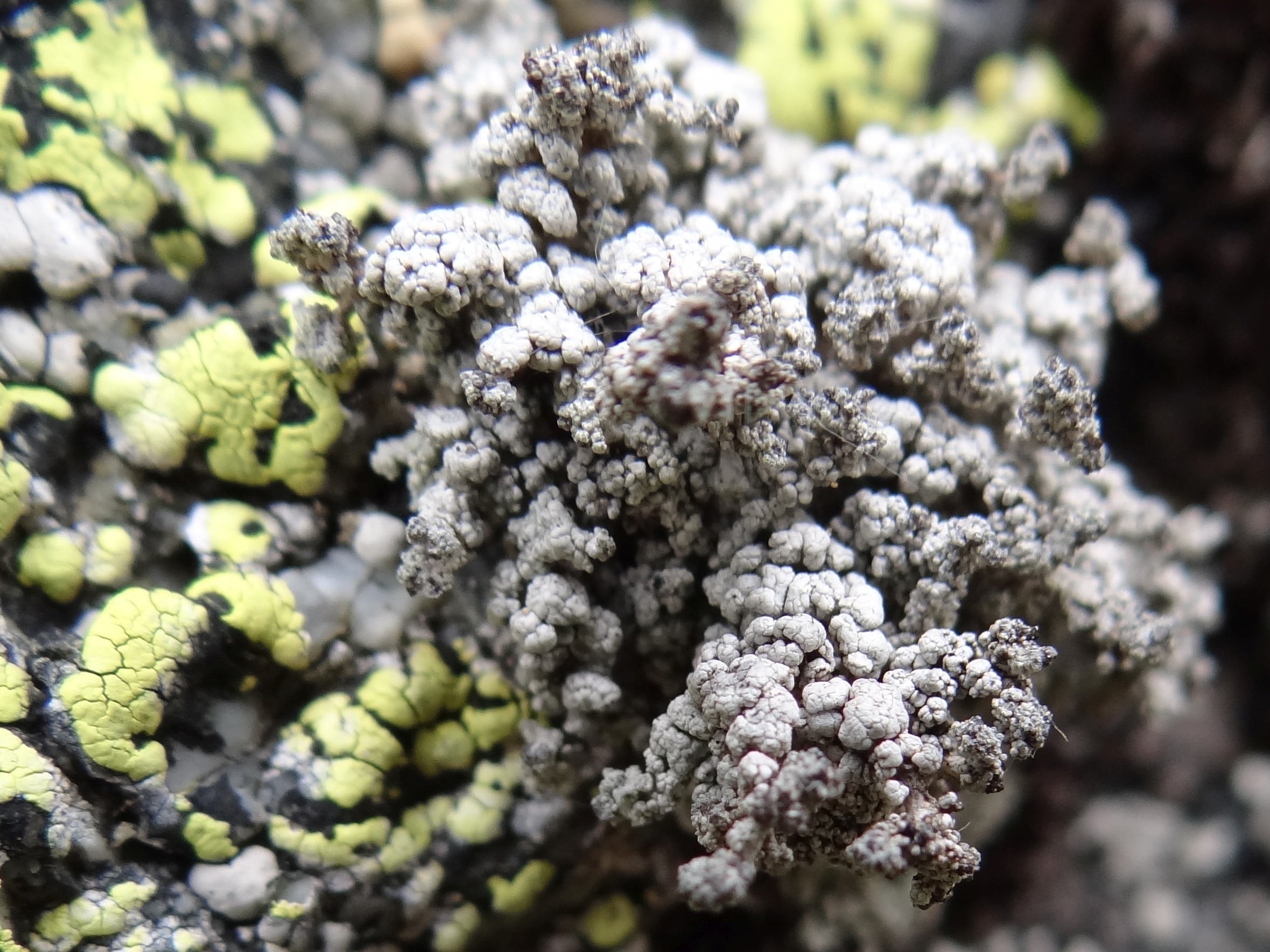

Conservation status
- Secure (NatureServe)

Scientific classification
- Kingdom: Fungi
- Division: Ascomycota
- Class: Lecanoromycetes
- Order: Lecanorales
- Family: Stereocaulaceae
- Genus: Stereocaulon
- Species: S. vesuvianum

Binomial name
- Stereocaulon vesuvianum Pers.

= Stereocaulon vesuvianum =

Species of lichen

Stereocaulon vesuvianum is a species of snow lichen belonging to the family Stereocaulaceae.

== Ecology ==
Stereocaulon vesuvianum is a known host to the lichenicolous fungus species Cercidospora stereocaulorum, Endococcus nanellus, Odontotrema stereocaulocola. and Scutula stereocaulorum.
