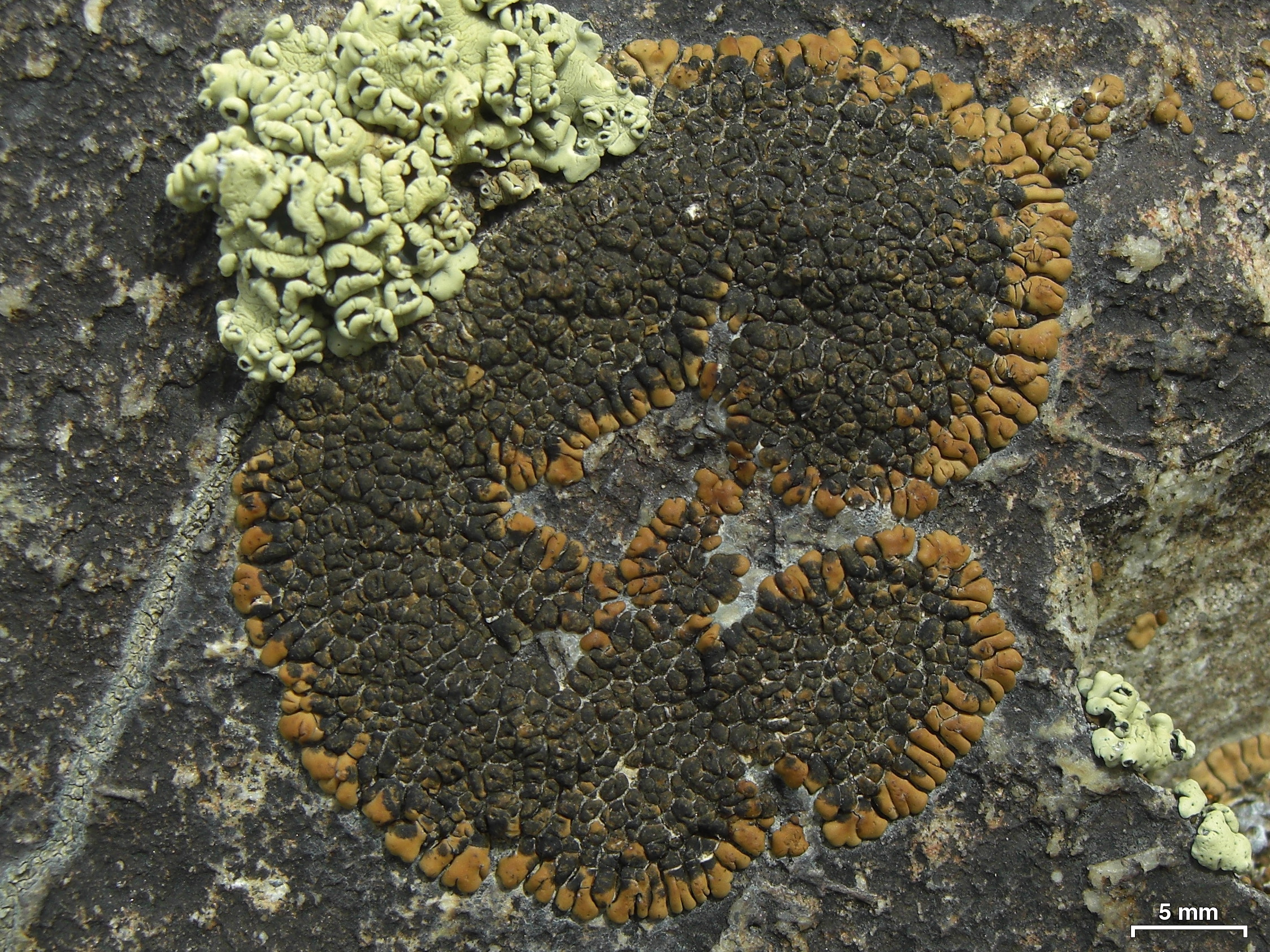
- This undescribed species of Sphaerellothecium is very common on Acarospora rosulata in Nevada.

Scientific classification
- Kingdom: Fungi
- Division: Ascomycota
- Class: Sordariomycetes
- Order: Phyllachorales
- Family: Phyllachoraceae
- Genus: Sphaerellothecium; Zopf (1897)

Type species
- Sphaerellothecium araneosum (Rehm ex Arnold) Zopf (1897)

= Sphaerellothecium =

Genus of fungi

Sphaerellothecium is a genus of fungi in the family Phyllachoraceae. All of the species in the genus are lichenicolous, meaning they grow parasitically on lichens.

== Species ==
- Sphaerellothecium abditum Triebel (1989)
- Sphaerellothecium aculeatae Khodos., Gavrylenko & Klymenko (2016) – Ukraine
- Sphaerellothecium aipoliae (Vouaux) Nav.-Ros. & Cl.Roux (2017)
- Sphaerellothecium araneosum (Rehm ex Arnold) Zopf (1897)
- Sphaerellothecium arctoparmeliae (Brackel & Schiefelb.) Diederich, Zhurb. & Brackel (2021)
- Sphaerellothecium arnoldii (A.Massal.) Hafellner (2019)
- Sphaerellothecium atryneae (Arnold) Cl.Roux & Triebel (1994)
- Sphaerellothecium breussii K.Knudsen, Kocourk. & Etayo (2009)
- Sphaerellothecium buelliae (C.W.Dodge) D.Hawksw. & Iturr. (2006)
- Sphaerellothecium cinerascens Etayo & Diederich (1998)
- Sphaerellothecium cladoniae (Alstrup & Zhurb.) Hafellner (2005)
- Sphaerellothecium cladoniicola E.S.Hansen & Alstrup (1995)
- Sphaerellothecium coniodes (Nyl.) Cl.Roux & Diederich (1994)
- Sphaerellothecium contextum Triebel (1989)
- Sphaerellothecium epilecanora Zhurb. (2013)
- Sphaerellothecium episoralium Etayo (2017)
- Sphaerellothecium episquamarinae Etayo (2008)
- Sphaerellothecium gallowayi Diederich (2007)
- Sphaerellothecium giraltiae van den Boom (2010)
- Sphaerellothecium gowardii Alstrup & M.S.Cole (1998)
- Sphaerellothecium heterodermiae van den Boom (2016) – Portugal
- Sphaerellothecium icmadophilae (R.Sant.) Zhurb. (2008)
- Sphaerellothecium leratianum Gardiennet & Cl.Roux (2013)
- Sphaerellothecium minutum Hafellner (1993) – Norway
- Sphaerellothecium pannariacearum Etayo (2008)
- Sphaerellothecium parietinarium (Linds.) Hafellner & Volk.John (2006)
- Sphaerellothecium parmeliae Diederich & Etayo (1998)
- Sphaerellothecium parmotrematis van den Boom (2016) – Portugal
- Sphaerellothecium phaeorrhizae Diederich & Zhurb. (2009)
- Sphaerellothecium propinquellum (Nyl.) Cl.Roux & Triebel (1994)
- Sphaerellothecium reticulatum (Zopf) Etayo (2008)
- Sphaerellothecium siphulae Zhurb. (2015) – Arctic
- Sphaerellothecium soechtingii Zhurb. & Alstrup (2007)
- Sphaerellothecium stereocaulorum Zhurb. & Triebel (2008)
- Sphaerellothecium subtile Triebel & Rambold (1991)
- Sphaerellothecium taimyricum (Zhurb.) Zhurb. (2019)
- Sphaerellothecium thamnoliae Zhurb. (2012)
- Sphaerellothecium usneicola Etayo (2017)
