= Caloplaca saviczii =

Scientific classification
- Domain: Eukaryota
- Kingdom: Fungi
- Division: Ascomycota
- Class: Lecanoromycetes
- Order: Teloschistales
- Family: Teloschistaceae
- Genus: Caloplaca
- Species: C. saviczii

Binomial name
- Caloplaca saviczii I.V.Frolov, Himelbrant, Stepanchikova, Konoreva & S.Chesnokov (2021)

Species of lichen

Caloplaca saviczii is a species of crustose lichen in the family Teloschistaceae. Found in the Russian Far East, it was formally described as a new species in 2021 by Ivan Frolov, Dmitry Himelbrant, Irina Stepanchikova, Liudmila Konoreva, and Sergey Chesnokov. The type specimen was collected in the fluvial valley of River Katal'yanayvayam (Penzhinsky District, Kamchatka); here, in a floodplain forest, it was found growing on the bark of Populus suaveolens. The specific epithet saviczii honours Russian lichenologist Vsevolod Pavlovich Savich (1885–1972), who studied the lichens of Kamchatka.

== See also ==
- List of Caloplaca species
