= Eilif Dahl =

Norwegian botanist and politician

Eilif Dahl (7 December 1916 – 17 March 1993) was a Norwegian botanist and politician for the Labour Party. He made contributions to the field of lichenology through his work on lichen chemistry and taxonomy, particularly his studies of Arctic flora. His most important publication was Studies in the Macrolichen Flora of SW Greenland (1950), which described several new lichen taxa. Dahl served as a professor of botany at the Norwegian College of Agriculture from 1965, was active in resistance work during the German occupation of Norway, and later became a board member of the Labour Party from 1965 to 1977. Throughout his career, he maintained connections between lichenology and other botanical disciplines, creating identification keys that proved valuable to researchers across Scandinavia and Australia.

== Early life and education ==
Dahl was born on 7 December 1916 in Kristiania. His interest in lichens started with an early friendship he developed with Professor Bernt Lynge. Thanks to Lynge, Dahl was able to take part in the 1936 Heimland botanical expedition to eastern Svalbard and Kong Karls Land, and then a Danish-Norwegian expedition to Greenland the next year. His collections from these excursions were used as part of his cand. real. thesis that he presented to the University of Oslo in 1942.

== Scientific contributions ==
After completing his thesis, Dahl developed an interest in lichen chemistry, which led him to an early career in Oslo. There, he adapted Yasuhiko Asahina's microchemical method for the determination of lichen acids, a technique that proved useful for the identification of species. He also discussed the usefulness of chemical characteristics in lichen taxonomy.

Although Dahl's chief interests eventually shifted into phytosociology, ecology, and phytogeography, he maintained his connection to lichenology. He collected numerous specimens from remote places and deposited them, mostly determined to genus, in the Botanical Museum of Oslo. When needed, he would provide preliminary keys for the determination of species, even for parts of the world whose lichen flora was less familiar to him.

According to Hildur Krog, his most important lichenological contribution was his 1950 work Studies in the Macrolichen Flora of SW Greenland, which was a revised version of his thesis. This publication describes one new lichen family, two new genera, and nine new species.

Dahl's interest in lichen chemistry also led him to produce a set of keys for Australian macrolichens during a sabbatical in Melbourne from 1970 to 1971. These keys were considered particularly valuable to Australian botanists interested in lichens. For a British Lichen Society field meeting in Norway in 1969, Dahl had previously produced analytical keys to Fennoscandian macrolichens, a forerunner to his later book Macrolichens of Denmark, Finland, Norway and Sweden which was published six years later.

== Career and political activities ==
Dahl was appointed professor of botany at the Norwegian College of Agriculture from 1965. His research interests centred on Arctic plants and lichen, plant geography and ecology. He was also a politician for the Labour Party, where he was a board member from 1965 to 1977. During the German occupation of Norway he took part in resistance work, and was a member of the clandestine intelligence organization XU. After fleeing to neutral Sweden and later to the United Kingdom, he served with the Norwegian High Command in London.

Despite suffering from emphysema for many years, Dahl remained mentally and physically active until shortly before his death at age 76 on 17 March 1993.

== Publications and legacy ==
Dahl's published lichenological papers are not extensive but are representative of his approach to science. He freely shared his knowledge and ideas with others, and those who worked closely with him remembered him as both a friend and inspiring teacher. During his lifetime, he played an important role in the national and international field of lichenology.

His bibliography includes few printed papers dealing with lichens. His first publication, co-authored with Lynge and Per Fredrik Scholander, appeared in 1937 and focused on lichens from southeast Greenland.

The lichen genus Eilifdahlia, and its type species, Eilifdahlia dahlii, are both named in his honour.

== See also ==
- Category:Taxa named by Eilif Dahl
