= Xyleborus (lichen) =

Scientific classification
- Kingdom: Fungi
- Division: Ascomycota
- Class: Lecanoromycetes
- Order: Lecanorales
- Family: Stereocaulaceae
- Genus: Xyleborus; R.C.Harris & Ladd (2007)

Type species
- Xyleborus sporodochifer R.C.Harris & Ladd (2007)

Species
- X. nigricans X. sporodochifer

Genus of lichen-forming fungi

Xyleborus is a small genus of lichen-forming fungi in the family Stereocaulaceae. It comprises two species. The genus was circumscribed in 2009 by Richard C. Harris and Douglas Ladd with Xyleborus sporodochifer assigned as the type species. A second species, X. nigricans, was added to the genus in 2015. This genus is only found in North America, in the Ozarks, the Appalachians, and the Mid-Atlantic Coastal Plain. Xyleborus species only grow as a crust with black apothecia on weathered logs and stumps in intact forests.

== Taxonomy ==
Xyleborus was erected in 2007 by Richard C. Harris and Douglas Ladd after they encountered an unusual crustose lichen with abundant white sporodochia on seasoned oak logs in the Ozark Highlands. They treated that species, X. sporodochifer, as the type and sole member of a new genus distinguished by its Micarea-type asci, lignicolous habit, and conspicuous sporodochial cushions, all rare features among crustose lichens.

A decade of additional collecting revealed that Xyleborus was not monospecific. In 2015 James Lendemer and Richard Harris described X. nigricans from the Mid-Atlantic Coastal Plain, showing that the genus contains two allopatric species with parallel wood-dwelling ecologies but clear morphological and substrate differences—X. sporodochifer has reddish-brown apothecia (fruiting bodies), larger spores, and consistently produces sporodochia on hardwood logs, whereas X. nigricans bears blackish apothecia, smaller spores, and only occasionally forms sporodochia on resin-rich conifer logs.

Despite the expanded species sampling, efforts to obtain DNA sequences from either taxon have so far failed, leaving the familial placement of the genus unresolved. Harris & Ladd originally placed the genus in the Stereocaulaceae, but Lendemer & Harris later highlighted that this position remains to be tested with molecular data.

== Description ==
Xyleborus is a crust-forming lichen that lives almost exclusively on weather-worn oak logs and stumps. To the naked eye the thallus shows up only as pale tan-to-olive patches, at first a scattering of rough "islands" no wider than a pin-head but eventually coalescing into a thin, continuous film. The algal partner (photobiont) consists of tiny, round green cells about 10–14 μm across, and chemical spot tests reveal little or no secondary chemistry, so the thallus has no distinctive colour reactions.

The fungus reproduces in two ways. Sexually, it makes minute brown to nearly black fruiting mounds (apothecia) 0.2–0.8 mm across that start out flat but soon swell into half-domes or tiny turrets. A faint, whitish frost of crystals often coats the disc; this pruina disappears instantly in a drop of potassium hydroxide solution, one of the standard field reagents. Under the microscope the apothecial wall (excipulum) is 50–80 μm thick: its hyphae lie close against one another in a clear, jelly-like layer, quite unlike the broad, balloon-tipped hyphae seen in related genera. Inside, the spore layer (hymenium) rises 60–80 μm high; its supporting filaments (paraphyses) are mostly hair-fine but a few finish in slightly swollen tips capped by a thin brown pigment. Each spore sac (ascus) is of the "Micarea type", holding eight colourless, single-celled ascospores that are spindle- to egg-shaped and measure roughly 7–10 × 3.5–4.5 μm.

Asexually, Xyleborus produces conspicuous white balls called sporodochia—rare structures in lichens. These hemispherical to nearly spherical cushions, 0.1–2 mm across, sit directly on the wood and turn a pale yellow in potassium hydroxide. They consist of tightly tangled, short-celled hyphae that give rise to chains of round conidia 2.5–4 μm in diameter, a feature that makes the genus distinctive even when apothecia are absent.

Taken together—the wood-dwelling habit, brown dome-shaped apothecia with a crystal frost, the clear gelatinous outer wall with narrow hyphae, and especially the large white sporodochia—these characters set Xyleborus apart from superficially similar crustose lichens that share the same oak logs.

== Habitat and distribution ==
Xyleborus is confined to well-weathered wood in mature eastern-North-American forests, but its two species occupy different landscapes and host trees. Xyleborus sporodochifer is an upland endemic of the Ozark Highlands and the southern Appalachian Mountains, where it colonises fallen oak and chestnut logs; the bark has usually sloughed away, yet the heartwood remains firm and free of punky decay, and the lichen forms pale, crusty films on the shaded upper surface of the wood. Repeated surveys have failed to find it outside those two highland regions, so the species is regarded as an Appalachian–Ozark narrow endemic.

Xyleborus nigricans, by contrast, is restricted to the low-lying Mid-Atlantic Coastal Plain. All verified collections come from North Carolina and South Carolina, where the lichen carpets resin-rich Atlantic white cedar and pine logs lying in swampy woods or damp coastal depressions only a few meters above sea level. Both species therefore share a preference for long-dead but still structurally sound wood in undisturbed forests, yet they partition the landscape by altitude, climate, and host: the upland taxon favours hardwoods in mesic to dry upland stands, whereas the coastal taxon lives on conifers in humid, low-elevation swamps.
