= Eilifdahlia dahlii =

Scientific classification
- Kingdom: Fungi
- Division: Ascomycota
- Class: Lecanoromycetes
- Order: Teloschistales
- Family: Teloschistaceae
- Genus: Eilifdahlia
- Species: E. dahlii

Binomial name
- Eilifdahlia dahlii (Elix, S.Y.Kondr. & Kärnefelt) S.Y.Kondr., Kärnefelt, Elix, A.Thell, Jung Kim, A.S.Kondr. & Hur (2014)
- Holotype site: Jimberoo State Forest, New South Wales

Synonyms
- Caloplaca dahlii Elix, S.Y.Kondr. & Kärnefelt (2009)

Species of lichen

Eilifdahlia dahlii is a species of corticolous (bark-dwelling), crustose lichen in the family Teloschistaceae. Widely distributed in Southern Australia, it was formally described as a new species in 2009 by John Elix, Sergey Kondratyuk, and Ingvar Kärnefelt. The type specimen was collected by the first author in 1990 from Mountain Creek in Jimberoo State Forest (New South Wales), where it was found growing on a dead Callitris on a rocky ridge dominated by that tree. It has also been recorded growing on the branch and twig bark of Casuarina stricta, and species of Eucalyptus, Leptospermum, and Melaleuca. The species epithet dahlii honours the Norwegian lichenologist Eilif Dahl, "for his significant contribution to Australian lichenology". The taxon was transferred to Eilifdahlia in 2014, a newly circumscribed genus in which it is the type species.
