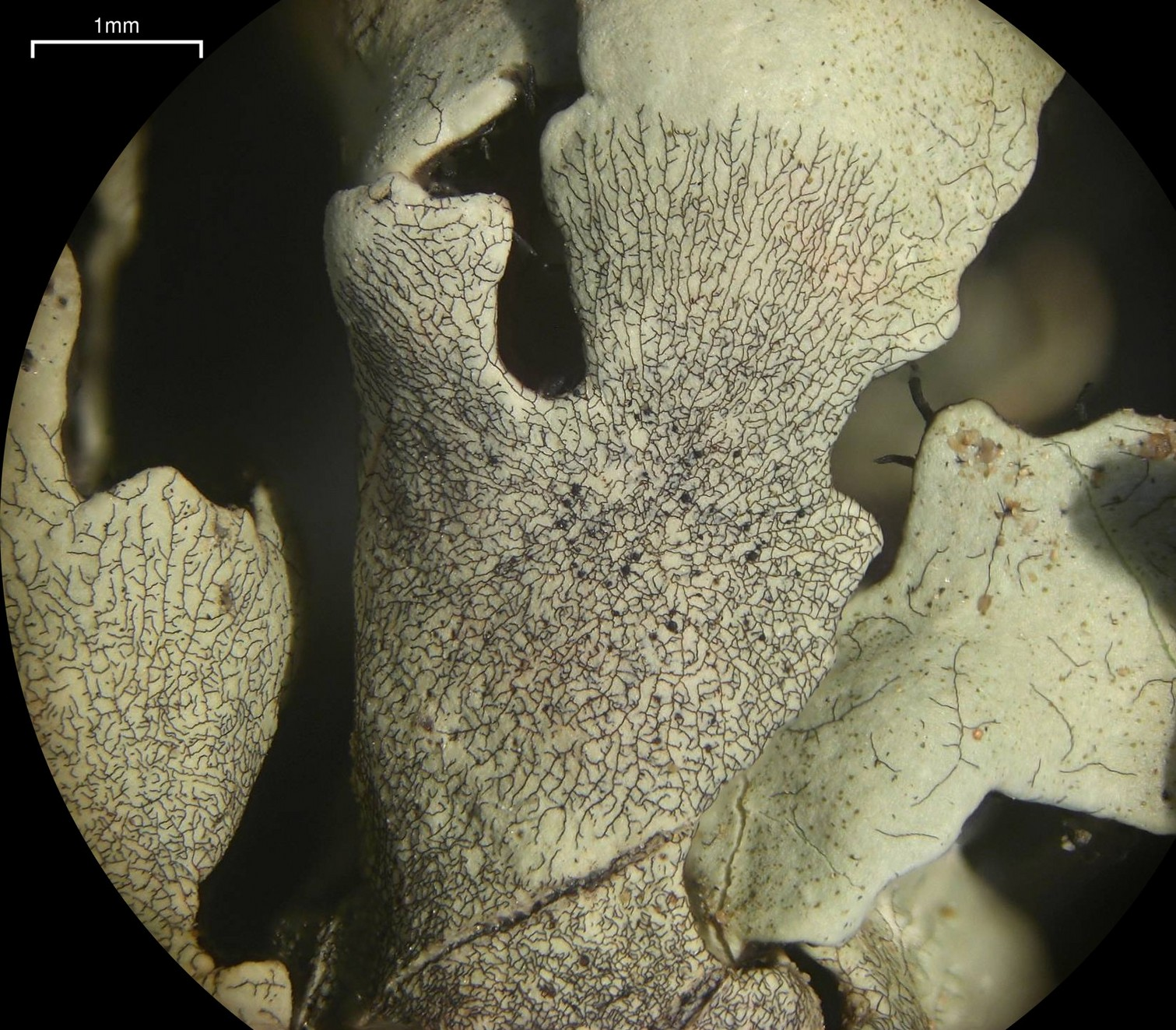
- Lichenostigma cosmopolites

Scientific classification
- Kingdom: Fungi
- Division: Ascomycota
- Class: Dothideomycetes
- Order: Lichenotheliales; K.Knudsen, Muggia & K.D.Hyde (2013)
- Family: Lichenotheliaceae; Henssen (1986)

Type genus
- Lichenothelia D.Hawksw. (1981)

Genera
- Endococcus; Lichenothelia; Lichenostigma

= Lichenotheliaceae =

Family of fungi

The Lichenotheliaceae are a family of fungi, and the only family in the order Lichenotheliales, which is in the class Dothideomycetes. The family contains three genera.
