= Vsevolod Savich =

Russian lichenologist (1885–1972)

Vsevolod Pavlovich Savich (Russian: Всеволод Павлович Савич; 19 February 1885 – 25 May 1972) was a Soviet lichenologist. He headed the Section of Cryptogamic Plants of the Komarov Botanical Institute of the Academy of Sciences of the Soviet Union. He issued the exsiccata Lichenotheca Rossica, regionibus confinibus completa, edidit hortus botanicus principalis URSS (1928-1972) and together with Lydia Ivanovna Savicz-Ljubitzkaja the series Bryotheca Rossica. Regionibus confinibus completa. Edidit Hortus Botanicus Principalis U.S.S.R. (1926-1928). Savich died in Leningrad in 1972. The crustose lichen Caloplaca saviczii is named in his honour.

== See also ==
- Category:Taxa named by Vsevolod Savich
