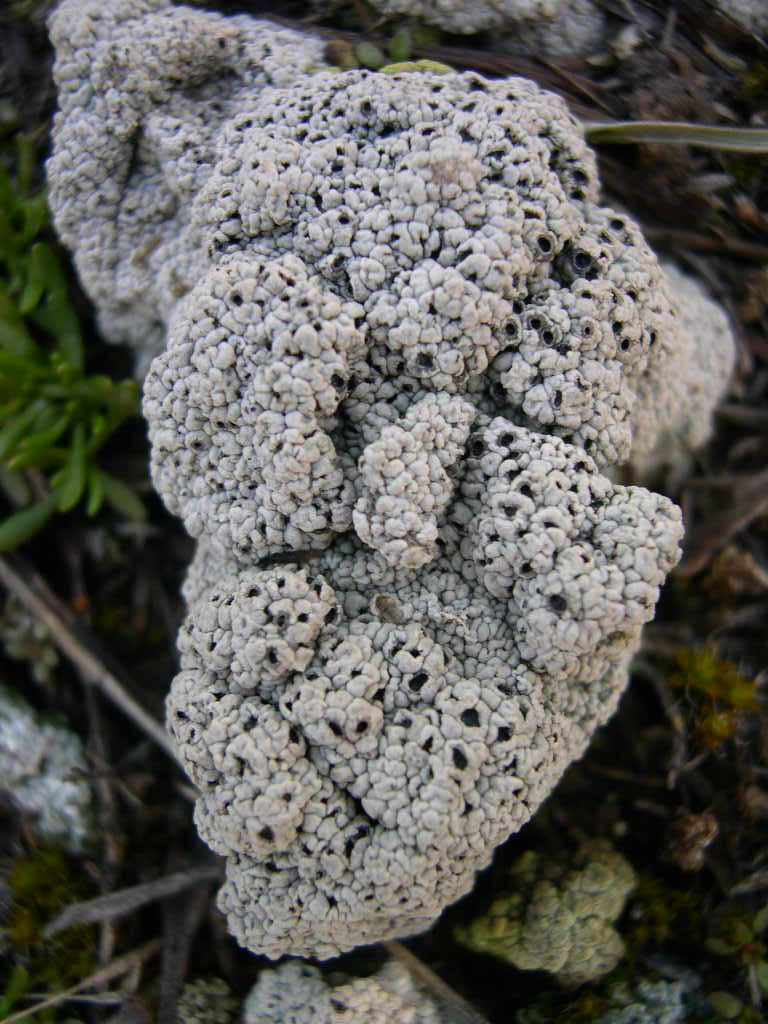

Conservation status
- Secure (NatureServe)

Scientific classification
- Kingdom: Fungi
- Division: Ascomycota
- Class: Lecanoromycetes
- Order: Graphidales
- Family: Graphidaceae
- Genus: Diploschistes
- Species: D. muscorum

Binomial name
- Diploschistes muscorum (Scop.) R.Sant. (1980)

Synonyms
- Lichen muscorum Scop. (1772) (basionym)

= Diploschistes muscorum =

Species of lichen-forming fungus

Diploschistes muscorum is a species of lichen-forming fungus belonging to the family Graphidaceae.

It has cosmopolitan distribution. In Nepal, Diploschistes muscorum has been reported from 900 to 2,160 m elevation in a compilation of published records.
