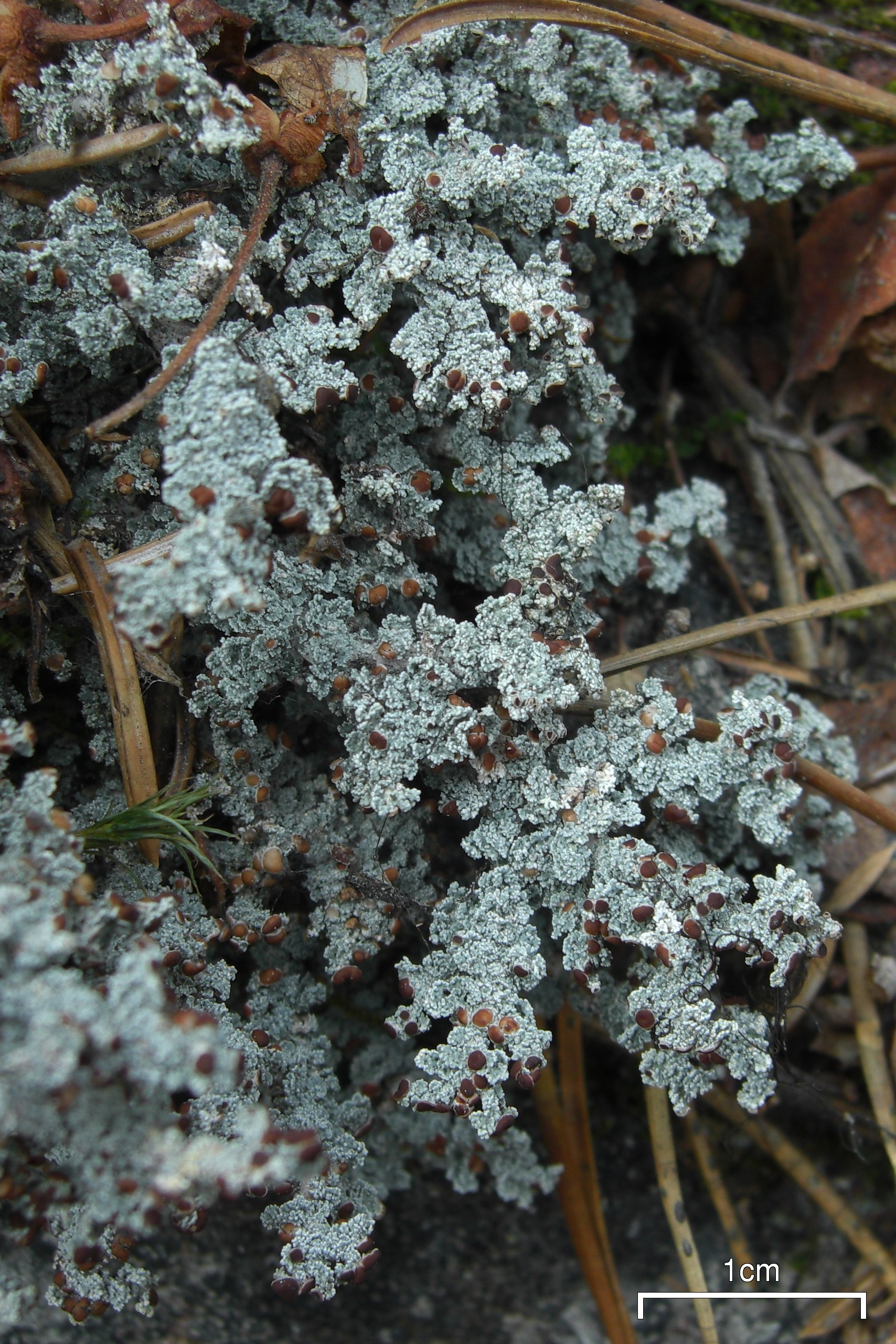
- Stereocaulon tomentosum

Scientific classification
- Kingdom: Fungi
- Division: Ascomycota
- Class: Lecanoromycetes
- Order: Lecanorales
- Family: Stereocaulaceae
- Genus: Stereocaulon; Hoffm. (1796)

Type species
- Stereocaulon paschale (L.) Hoffm. (1796)

Species
- See text

Synonyms
- Lachnocaulon Clem. & Shear (1931)

= Stereocaulon =

Genus of lichens

Stereocaulon is a genus of lichens. Members of Stereocaulon are commonly called rock foam lichens. Photobiont partners of Stereocaulon include green algae from the genera Asterochloris, Chloroidium, and Vulcanochloris. Stereocaulon is difficult to ID to species, but there is a high diversity of species within the genus.

== Species ==
The following species are assigned to this genus:

- Stereocaulon alpinum Laurer (1827)
- Stereocaulon apocalypticum Nyl. (1867)
- Stereocaulon arcticum Lynge
- Stereocaulon arenarium (L.I.Savicz) I.M.Lamb
- Stereocaulon areolatum McCune, E.Di Meglio & Tønsberg (2019)
- Stereocaulon argus Hook.f. & Taylor (1844)
- Stereocaulon austroshetlandicum Øvstedal (2001)
- Stereocaulon botryosum Ach. (1810)
- Stereocaulon caespitosum Redinger (1936)
- Stereocaulon capitellatum H.Magn.
- Stereocaulon cephalocrustatum McCune, E.Di Meglio & Tønsberg (2019)
- Stereocaulon compactum (I.M. Lamb) Øvstedal (2009)
- Stereocaulon condensatum Hoffm. (1796)
- Stereocaulon corticatulum Nyl. (1858)
- Stereocaulon cumulatum (Sommerf.) Timdal (2002)
- Stereocaulon cymosum Cromb. (1876)
- Stereocaulon dactylophyllum Flörke (1819)
- Stereocaulon delisei Bory ex Duby (1830)
- Stereocaulon depressum (Frey) I.M.Lamb
- Stereocaulon evolutum Graewe (1865)
- Stereocaulon exalbidum Nyl. (1859)
- Stereocaulon exutum Nyl. (1890)
- Stereocaulon fecundum McCune, E.Di Meglio & Tønsberg (2019)
- Stereocaulon glareosum (Savicz) H.Magn. (1926)
- Stereocaulon grande (H.Magn.) H.Magn.
- Stereocaulon gregarium Redinger (1936)
- Stereocaulon groenlandicum (E.Dahl) I.M.Lamb
- Stereocaulon heardii Øvstedal (2006)
- Stereocaulon hypothallinum McCune, E.Di Meglio & Tønsberg (2019)
- Stereocaulon incrustatum Flörke (1819)
- Stereocaulon intermedium (Savicz) H.Magn. (1926)
- Stereocaulon kangdingense M.R.Huang & J.C.Wei (2004)
- Stereocaulon klondikense T.Sprib. (2010)
- Stereocaulon leucophaeopsis (Nyl.) P.James & Purvis (1985)
- Stereocaulon magellanicum (Th.Fr.) Zahlbr. (1927)
- Stereocaulon myriocarpum Th.Fr.
- Stereocaulon nanodes Tuck. (1859)
- Stereocaulon nivale (Follmann) Fryday (2003)
- Stereocaulon oregonense McCune, E.Di Meglio & Tønsberg (2019)
- Stereocaulon paschale (L.) Hoffm. (1796)
- Stereocaulon pileatum Ach. (1810)
- Stereocaulon plicatile (Leight.) Fryday & Coppins (1996)
- Stereocaulon ramulosum Raeusch. (1797)
- Stereocaulon rivulorum H.Magn.
- Stereocaulon saxatile H.Magn. (1926)
- Stereocaulon sorediiphyllum M.R.Huang & J.C.Wei (2004)
- Stereocaulon soufrieranum Øvstedal & Elix (2010)
- Stereocaulon spathuliferum Vain. (1909)
- Stereocaulon subcoralloides Nyl. (1878)
- Stereocaulon symphycheilum I.M.Lamb (1961)
- Stereocaulon tomentosum Fr. (1825)
- Stereocaulon tornense (H.Magn.) P.James & Purvis (1985)
- Stereocaulon trachyphloeum I.M.Lamb (1976)
- Stereocaulon vesuvianum Pers. (1810)
