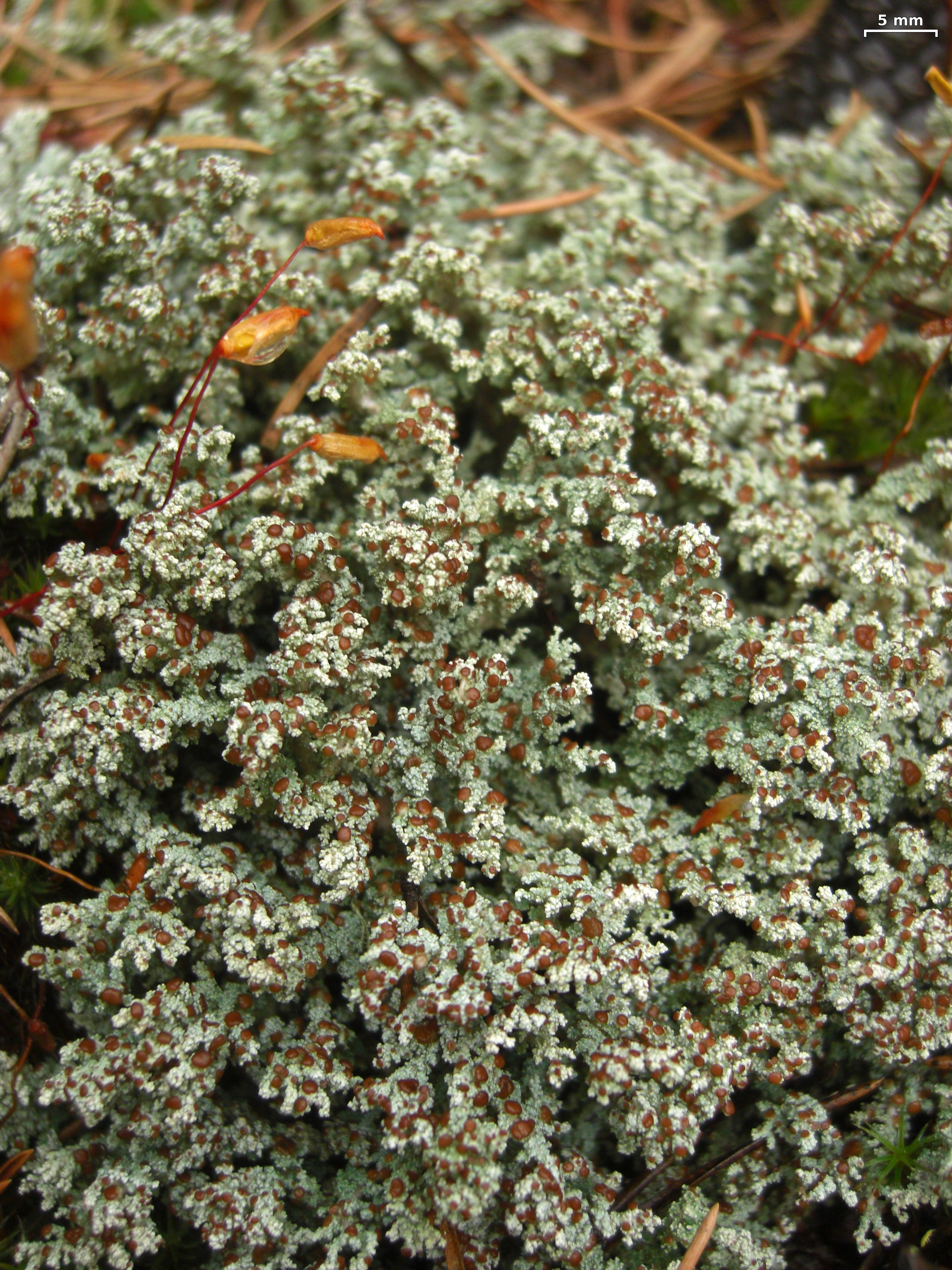
- Stereocaulon tomentosum

Scientific classification
- Kingdom: Fungi
- Division: Ascomycota
- Class: Lecanoromycetes
- Order: Lecanorales
- Family: Stereocaulaceae; Chevall. (1826)

Type genus
- Stereocaulon Hoffm. (1796)

Genera
- Hertelidea; Lepraria; Stereocaulon; Squamarina; Xyleborus

= Stereocaulaceae =

Family of fungi

The Stereocaulaceae are a family of lichen-forming fungi in the order Lecanorales. It contains five genera. Species of this family are widely distributed in temperate boreal and austral regions.

== Genera ==
- Hertelidea Printzen & Kantvilas (2004) – 6 spp.
- Lepraria Ach. (1803) – 86 spp.
- Stereocaulon Hoffm. (1796) – 45 spp.
- Squamarina Poelt (1958) – 4 spp.
- Xyleborus R.C.Harris & Ladd (2007) – 2 spp.
