= Cladonia krogiana =

Scientific classification
- Kingdom: Fungi
- Division: Ascomycota
- Class: Lecanoromycetes
- Order: Lecanorales
- Family: Cladoniaceae
- Genus: Cladonia
- Species: C. krogiana

Binomial name
- Cladonia krogiana Løfall & Timdal (2002)
- Holotype: Østfold, Norway

Species of lichen

Cladonia krogiana is a species of fruticose lichen in the family Cladoniaceae, described to science in 2002. This lichen is characterised by its greyish-green to medium-brown squamulose (scaly) primary thallus, forming cushions up to 10 cm (4 in) wide, with distinctive chemical components including barbatic acid and the rare xanthone compound chlorovinetorin. Originally discovered in southeastern Norway, C. krogiana has since been found in the Czech Republic and New Brunswick, Canada, typically growing on sun-exposed siliceous rock in periodically wet, open areas near forests and water bodies.

== Taxonomy ==
Described as a new species in 2002 by Bjørn Petter Lofall and Einar Timdal, Cladonia krogiana was first identified from specimens collected by the authors near the southwestern side of Lake Franesjaen in Østfold, Norway. The species epithet honours Hildur Krog for her contributions to lichen taxonomy. Molecular phylogenetics studies show that it is closely related to Cladonia robbinsii, which is endemic to the Americas.

== Description ==
The primary thallus of Cladonia krogiana is squamulose (scale-like), persistent, and forms cushions up to 10 cm (4 in) wide. The squamules are ascending, up to 8 mm long and 4 mm wide, with crenulate to deeply incised edges. They are greyish green to medium-brown on the upper side and white to brownish at the base on the underside. The apothecia (fruiting bodies) are immature and brown, and the species lacks podetia.

== Similar species ==
Although Cladonia krogiana is closely related to and can be mistaken for a few other species, it is differentiated by its unique chemical profile and certain physical traits. For example, Cladonia strepsilis and Cladonia robbinsii both contain barbatic acid like Cladonia krogiana. In C. strepsilis, the barbatic acid is present only in the podetia, not in the primary squamules, which instead contain other acids such as baeomycesic acid, squamatic acid, and strepsilin. This species also features greener, larger, and more maculate (spotted) primary squamules. C. robbinsii differs from C. krogiana by having paler yellow, often more involute} primary squamules containing both barbatic and usnic acids.

Cladonia polycarpoides shares similar a thallus structure with C. krogiana but is chemically distinct. It is found within the C. subcariosa group and contains norstictic acid and homoheveadride, contrasting significantly with the depside and xanthone content of C. krogiana. The two species might be distinguished in the field by their spot test reactions: C. krogiana is negative in all standard chemical tests (PD, K, C, KC, UV), whereas C. polycarpoides may show positive reactions.

Other European Cladonia species that might be confused with Cladonia krogiana include C. cervicomis, C. callosa, C. firma, C. macrophyllodes, C. subcervicornis, and C. symphycarpia. These species generally differ in their chemical reactions to PD tests and other specific secondary metabolites they contain, which are not found in C. krogiana. For example, C. callosa contains grayanic acid and is also a member of the section Helopodium, like C. polycarpoides.

The distinctive combination of morphological and chemical characteristics in Cladonia krogiana, particularly the presence of chlorovinetorin and its specific reaction patterns, help in distinguishing it from these similar species.

== Chemistry ==
Cladonia krogiana contains barbatic acid and chlorovinetorin as major secondary metabolites (lichen products). It is significant for the presence of the rare xanthone chlorovinetorin, previously reported in only a few other lichen species, and the depside barbatic acid, common in many Cladonia species but presented in a unique chemical context here.

== Distribution and habitat ==
Known originally from several localities within southeast Norway, Cladonia krogiana grows on exposed siliceous rock like gneiss and amphibolite, often in locations that are periodically wetted by trickling water or spring floods. It typically inhabits open, exposed sites on the borders of conifer or mixed forests near lakes or rivers. It has also been reported from the Czech Republic, where it was found on open semi-native pine forest on ultramafic rock in the Ransko National Nature Reserve; this is both a geographically and ecologically outlying occurrence for this lichen. The first report of its occurrence in North America was reported in 2021, after it was found in two localities in New Brunswick.

This lichen primarily colonises thin soil covers or mosses in its natural habitats, indicating a preference for substrates that provide a stable microclimate and sufficient moisture retention.

== See also ==
- List of Cladonia species
