= Cladonia litoralis =

Scientific classification
- Kingdom: Fungi
- Division: Ascomycota
- Class: Lecanoromycetes
- Order: Lecanorales
- Family: Cladoniaceae
- Genus: Cladonia
- Species: C. litoralis

Binomial name
- Cladonia litoralis Gumboski & Eliasaro (2011)
- Holotype: Mariscal Beach, Brazil

Species of lichen-forming fungus

Cladonia litoralis is a species of fruticose lichen in the family Cladoniaceae. It was described in 2011 from the Atlantic coast of Santa Catarina State in southern Brazil. There it forms dense, convex cushions of overlapping squamules (scale-like lobes) on exposed granitic coastal rocks. It has yellowish-green, glossy squamules; small podetia with closed branch angles (axils); frequent brown pycnidia; and only one detected secondary metabolite, fumarprotocetraric acid.

== Taxonomy ==
Cladonia litoralis was described as a new species in 2011 by Emerson Luiz Gumboski and Sionara Eliasaro, based on collections from the Atlantic coast of southern Brazil. In modern classifications of Cladonia, it is placed in the broad "Cladonia" supergroup (a major lineage within the genus). The type specimen was collected on granitic rocks at Mariscal Beach near Bombinhas (Santa Catarina State), at about 3 m elevation. The holotype is preserved in the UPCB herbarium (Federal University of Paraná).

The epithet litoralis refers to the species' seashore habitat. The original description compared the species with other cushion-forming Cladonia species. It differs from C. strepsilis in having podetia that are mostly ecorticate (lacking an outer cortex) and in lacking a green C-test reaction (associated with strepsilin). It also differs from C. subcervicornis, which has corticate (cortex-covered), cup-bearing (scyphose) podetia. It can be confused with squamulose (squamule-dominated) forms of C. ochracea. C. litoralis usually forms convex, often rounded cushions, with smooth (not grainy) squamule margins and lower surfaces, and it differs in the form and internal structure of granules on the podetia.

== Description ==
The main body of the lichen (the primary thallus) is persistent and strongly developed. It consists of overlapping squamules (small, scale-like lobes) that build dense, convex cushions up to about 7 cm (2.8 in) wide and 2.5 cm (0.98 in) tall. Individual squamules are elongated and sometimes strap-like, slightly convex, and about 1.0–7.0 mm long by 0.7–1.5 mm wide. Their margins are rolled inward and range from smooth to irregularly scalloped. The upper surface is yellowish green, smooth, and glossy. The squamules lack powdery soredia (granular propagules) and root-like rhizines. The lower surface is white to brownish and has a cobwebby texture.

Podetia (upright stalks arising from the squamules) are common but small and whitish, about 0.4–0.8 cm tall and 0.3–0.5 mm thick. They are usually simple, only rarely branching near the tips. They lack cups (ascyphose), and any inner angles at branch points (axils) are closed rather than open. Most of the podetium surface lacks a cortex (outer layer), except near the base; on young podetia the cortex may extend farther upward. Podetia are generally not sorediate (soredia-bearing), but they may be completely covered by shiny, cylindrical granules. Small squamules can also occur on the podetia, and new podetia may develop from these secondary squamules.

Asexual reproductive structures are frequent. The pycnidia (asexual fruiting bodies) are brown and pear-shaped, up to about 0.2 mm wide, and occur at the tips or along the sides of podetia. The conidia (asexual spores) are colorless (hyaline) and slightly curved, about 7–10 × 1 μm. No sexualstructures were observed in the type material. In standard chemical spot tests, reactions were negative with C and KC. The K test was negative or sometimes turned dirty yellow, the P test turned red, and no ultraviolet fluorescence was seen. Thin-layer chromatography detected only fumarprotocetraric acid.

== Habitat and distribution ==
At the time it was described, Cladonia litoralis was known only from Mariscal Beach on the rocky shoreline of Santa Catarina State in southern Brazil. It grows directly on granitic rock in sunny, wind-exposed coastal sites. In the collection area it was infrequent, but it could form conspicuous colonies. It was not observed growing together with other Cladonia species. The original description cited an additional specimen from the same locality and habitat, so at publication the species was still known from a single site. As of 2025, no additional locations were reported in the Brazilian lichen checklist.

== See also ==
- List of Cladonia species
