= Soest, Netherlands =

Soest
- Town and municipality
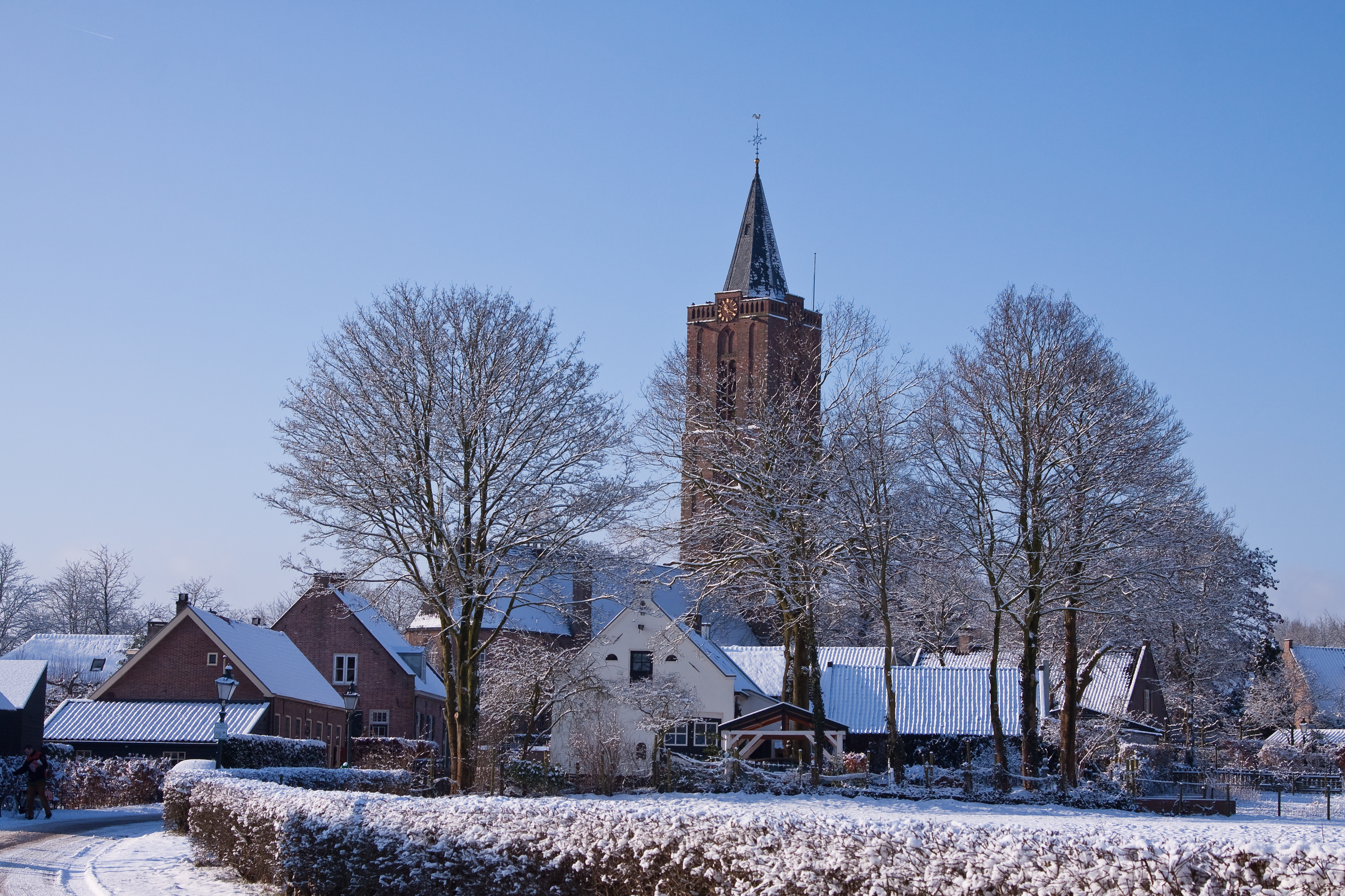
- Church in Soest

- Flag Coat of arms

- Location in Utrecht
- Coordinates: 52°10′29″N 5°17′30″E
- Country: Netherlands
- Province: Utrecht

Government
  - Body: Municipal council
  - Mayor: Rob Metz (VVD)

Area
  - Total: 46.43 km^{2} (17.93 sq mi)
  - Land: 46.24 km^{2} (17.85 sq mi)
  - Water: 0.19 km^{2} (0.073 sq mi)
- Elevation: 13 m (43 ft)

Population (January 2026)
  - Total: 47,853
  - Density: 1,035/km^{2} (2,680/sq mi)
- Demonym(s): Soestenaar, Soester
- Time zone: UTC+1 (CET)
  - Summer (DST): UTC+2 (CEST)
- Postcode: 3760–3769
- Area code: 035
- Website: soest.nl

Soest (Dutch pronunciation: [sust]) is a municipality and town in the central Netherlands, in the province of Utrecht. It is about 6 km (4 mi) west of Amersfoort.

== Population centres ==
- Boerenstreek
- De Eng Soest Midden
- 't Hart Soestdijk
- Klaarwater
- Overhees
- Smitsveen
- Soestduinen
- Soesterberg
- Soest-Zuid

== The town of Soest ==
The oldest documents mentioning Soest (then written as Zoys) date from 1029. Its oldest church (the Oude Kerk, meaning Old Church), which is still in use today, dates from the fifteenth century. Traces of earlier habitation are found though. The area of "Hees", now at the outskirts of Soest may date in to the Early Middle Ages, and prehistoric burial mounds in the Soesterduinen point to early habitation in this area.

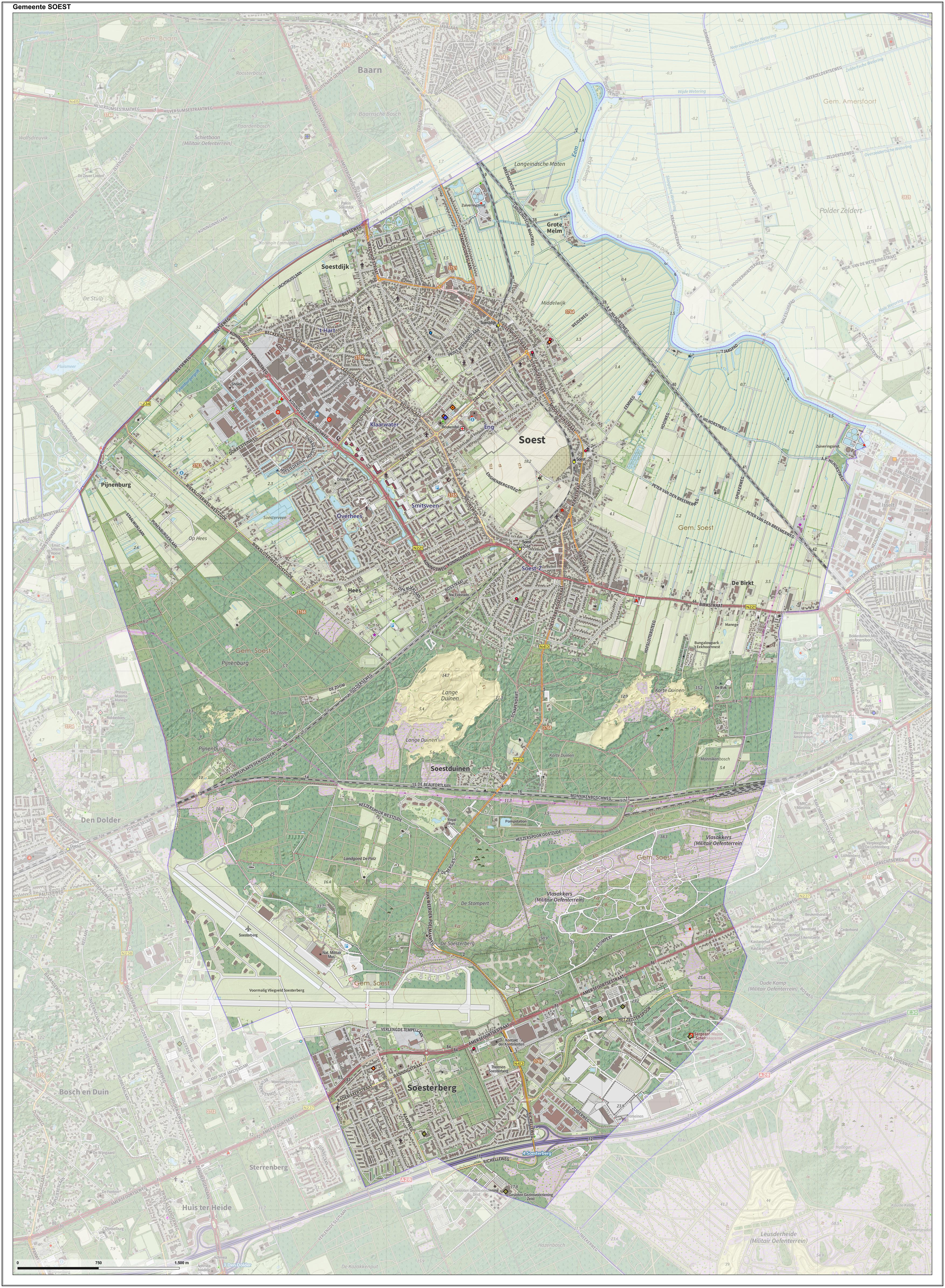
Topographic map of Soest

Agricultural activity is still important as there is much farmland within Soest. The biggest area is in the center of the town, on a hill, and is called 'de Engh'. A small street is het Kerkpad (literally, the Church Path). The Soesterduinen (sand dunes), is a popular area for recreation.

Numerous churches depict the Calvinist/Catholic tradition of Soest and the region. Wilhelmina Kerk Soest, Gereformeerde Kerk Vrijgemaakt, Emmakerk and the Evangelie Gemeente Soest (meets in church building Julianakerk) are the main churches.

Soestduinen, meaning Soest Dunes, a small town between Soest and Soesterberg contains acres upon acres of sand dunes named the Lange Duinen (meaning the long dunes).

Currently some 50,000 inhabitants live in Soest, consisting mainly of commuters.

== Transport ==
Soest has three railway stations:

- Soestdijk
- Soest
- Soest Zuid

The biggest of the three is Soest Zuid.

Soest can be reached by train from Utrecht (every half-hour, xx:06 and xx:36) and Baarn (xx:22 and xx:52); all trains stop at the three stations. The station of Soestduinen, situated between Utrecht Centraal and Amersfoort Centraal, was closed in 1998, after being in use for 135 years. It is now a restaurant.

The stations that can be reached directly from Soest are:

- Baarn
- Den Dolder
- Bilthoven
- Utrecht Overvecht
- Utrecht Centraal

Soest has a number of bus stops and three bus lines, all of which leave from the bus station at Soest Zuid exactly at the half-hour. Line 70 however, travel both directions to Amersfoort and Hilversum. Line 74 travels within the town of Soest. And multiple others travel through Soest. (272 Bunschoten-Spakenburg to Uithof, Utrecht vv. More info found at 9292ov.nl for all the public transport connections

== Notable people ==
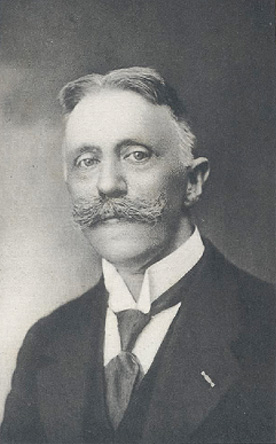
Dirk Jan de Geer, 1930

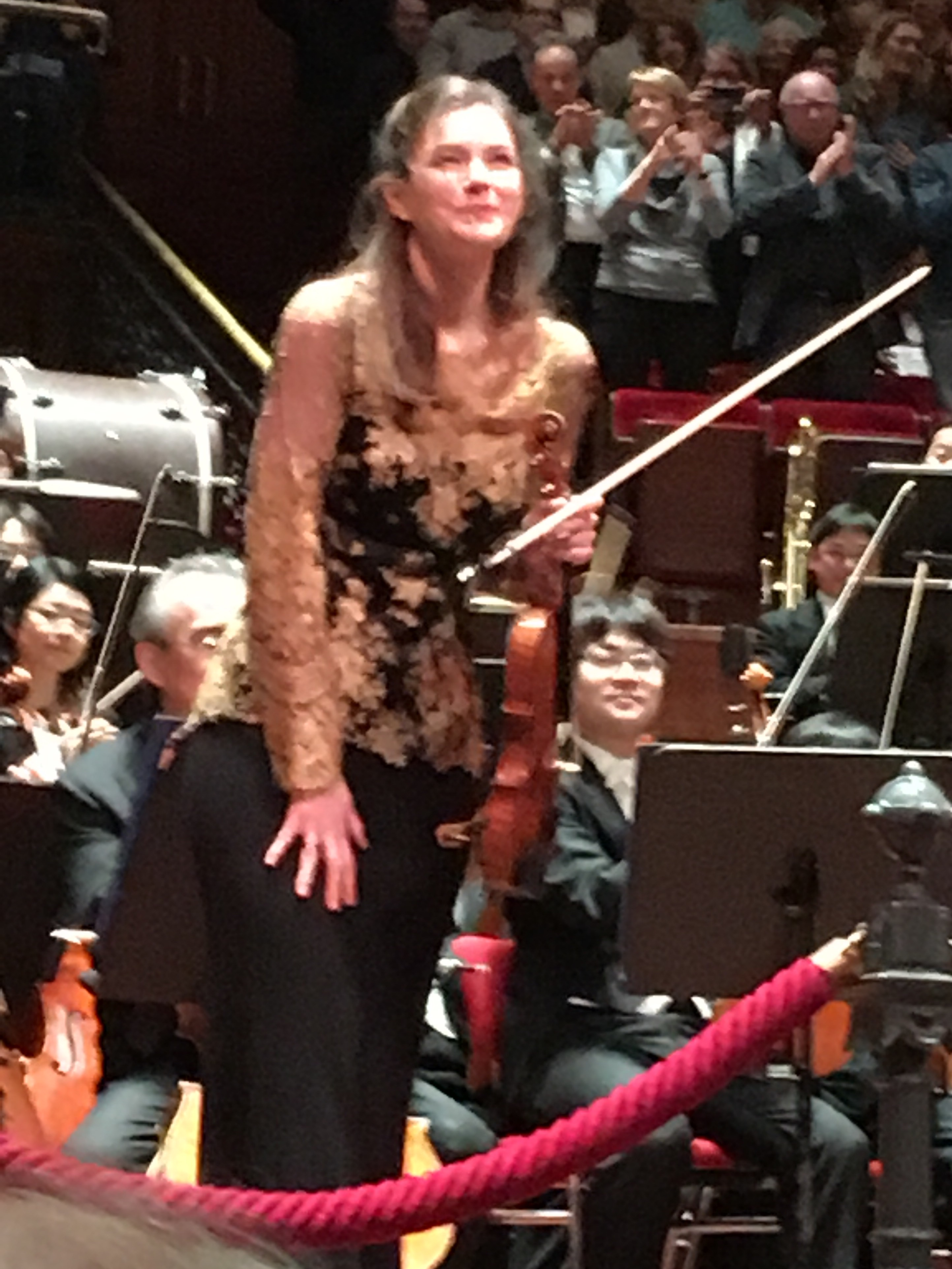
Janine Jansen

- Gerard Soest (c. 1600 – 1681) portrait painter who was active in England
- Prince Alexander of the Netherlands (1818–1848) second son to King William II and Queen Anna Paulovna
- Dirk Jan de Geer (1870–1960) politician, Prime Minister of the Netherlands 1926–1929 and 1939–1940
- Frida Vogels (1930–2026) writer, lived in Bologna
- Ed van den Heuvel (born 1940) astronomer
- Marlous Fluitsma (born 1946) actress
- Peter Kooy (born 1954) bass singer specializing in baroque music
- Jack Wouterse (born 1957) actor
- Thomas von der Dunk (born 1961) cultural historian, writer and columnist
- Janine Jansen (born 1978) a violinist and violist
- Mirik Milan (born 1981), former Amsterdam Night Mayor
- Els van Doesburg (born 1989), Mayor of Antwerp

=== Sport ===
- Robert Roest (born 1969) footballer
- Jolanda Elshof (born 1975) retired volleyball player
- Bianca van den Hoek (born 1976) professional racing cyclist
- Richard van Zijtveld (born 1979) former darts player
- Daniël Stellwagen (born 1987) chess grandmaster
- Daan Huizing (born 1990) professional golfer

=== Business ===
- Henryck Spierenburg (born 2000), Associate Consultant at OC&C Strategy Consultants

== Sport ==
There are four football clubs in Soest: SEC, VV Hees, SO Soest and VVZ '49. Soesterberg has its own football club, VV 't Vliegdorp.

== Twin towns – sister cities ==
Soest is twinned with:

- Soest, Germany, since 2004

== Gallery ==
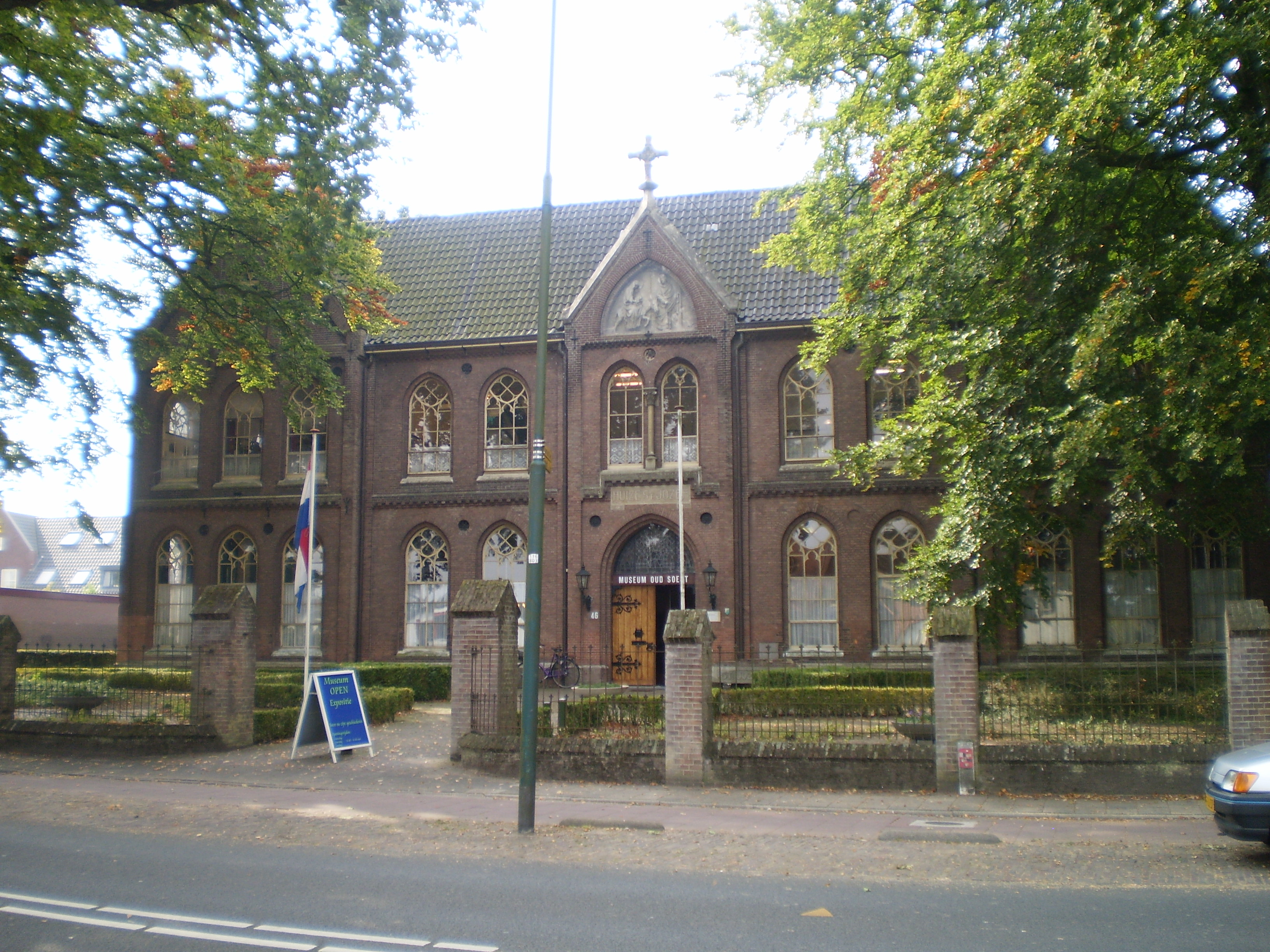
Museum: Old Soest

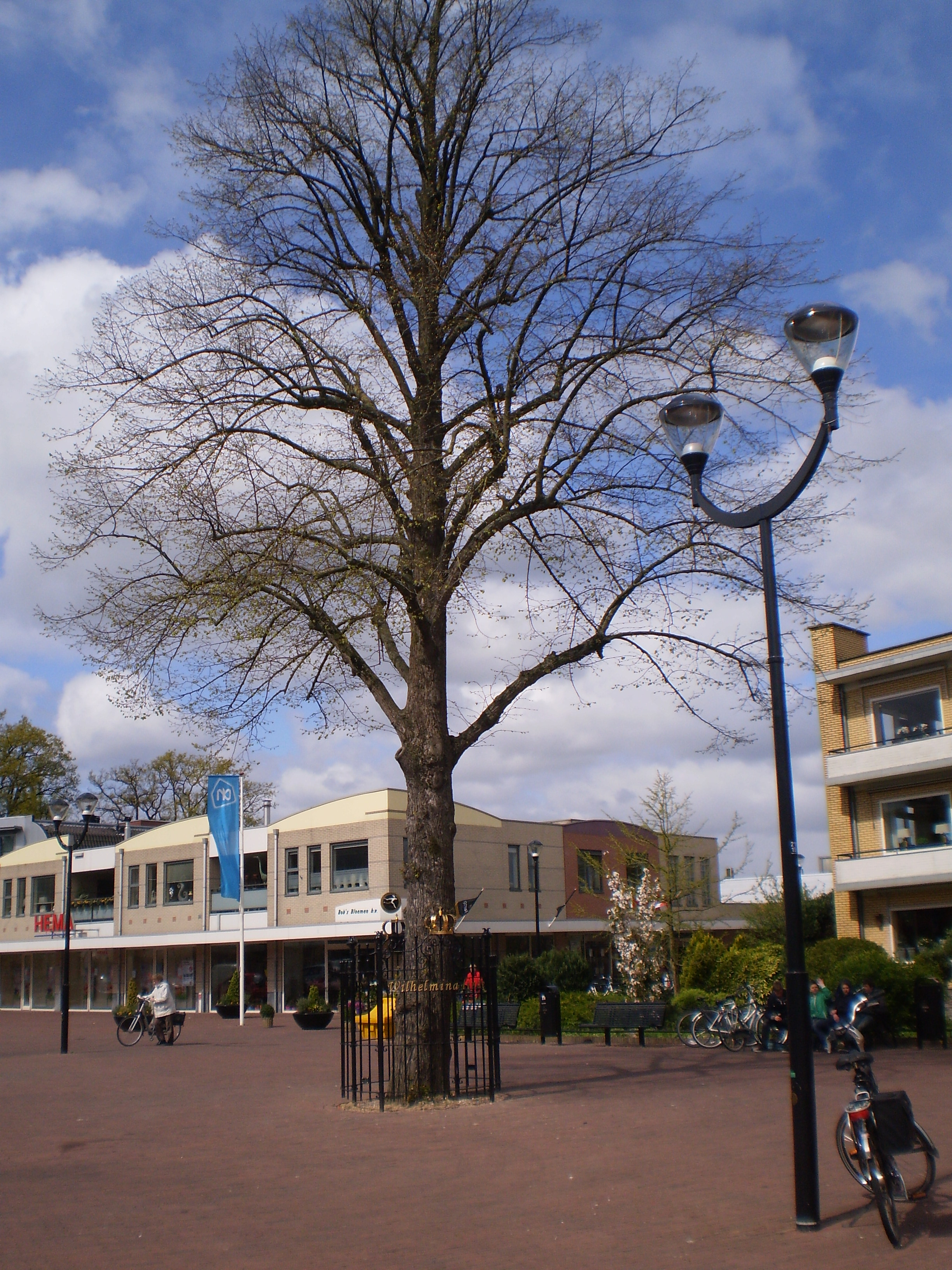
Soest: Wilhelminalinde

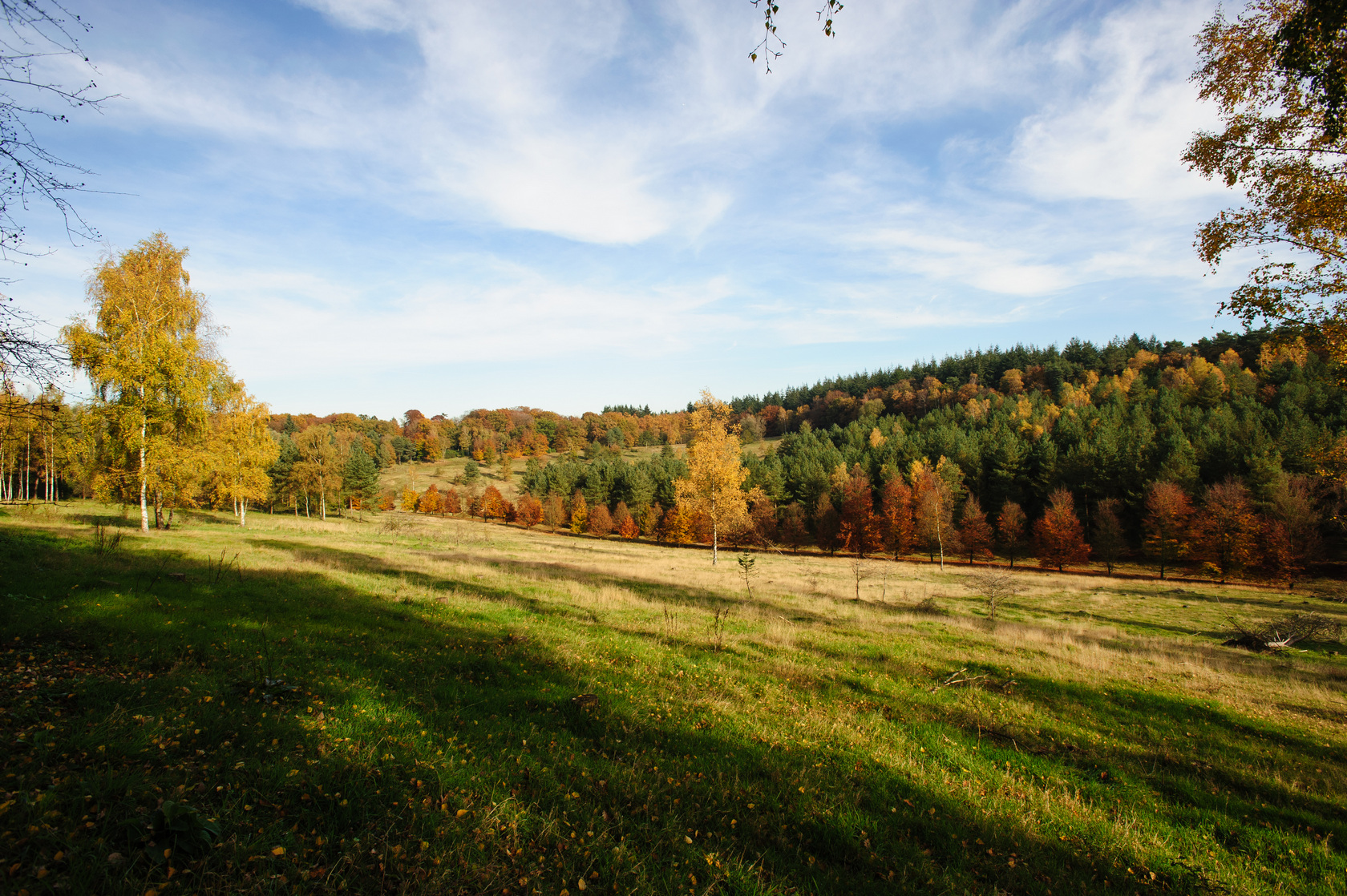
Soest, Netherlands: autumn landscape

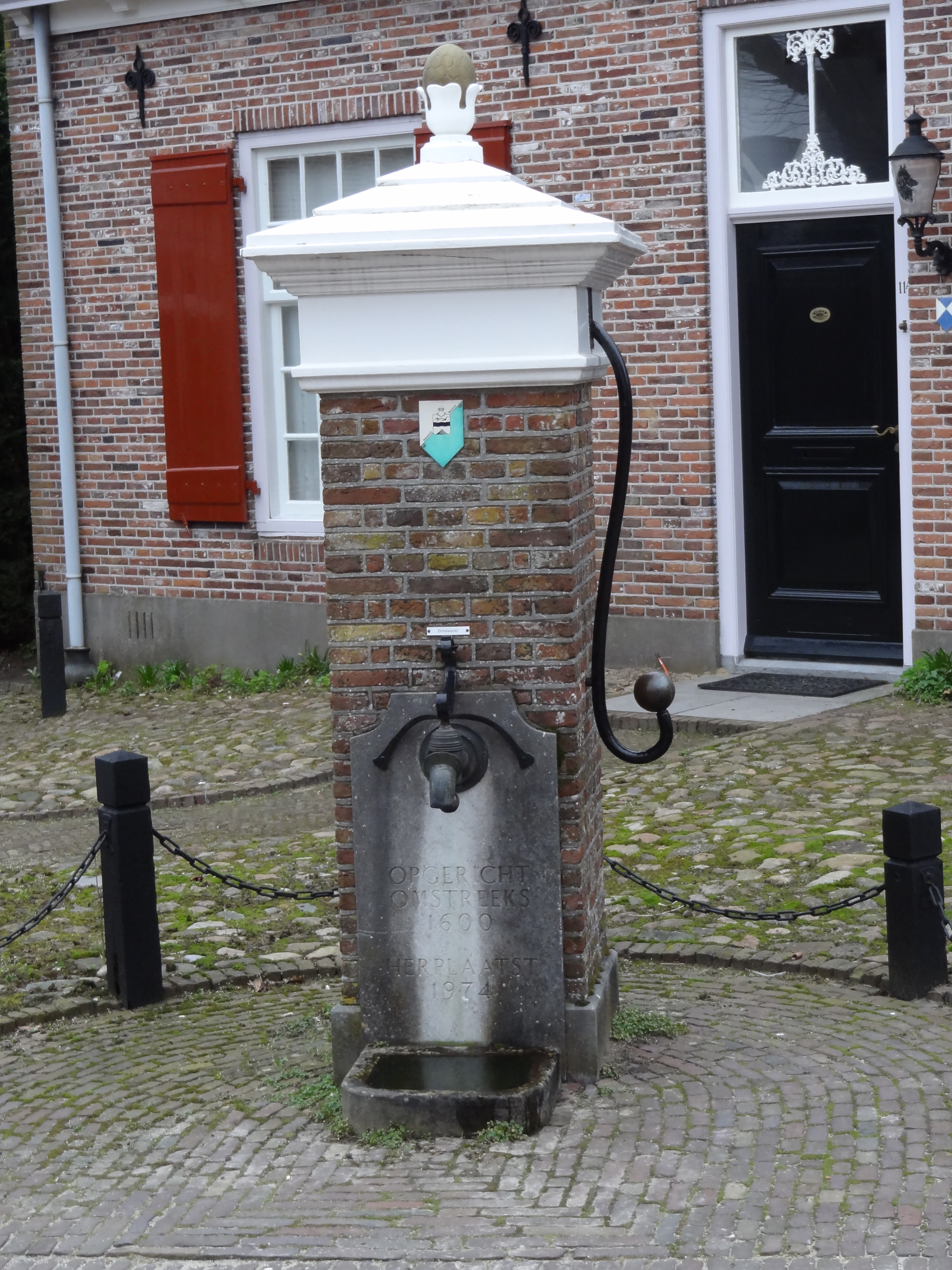
Soest: Water pump at intersection of Kerkstraat and Eemstraat

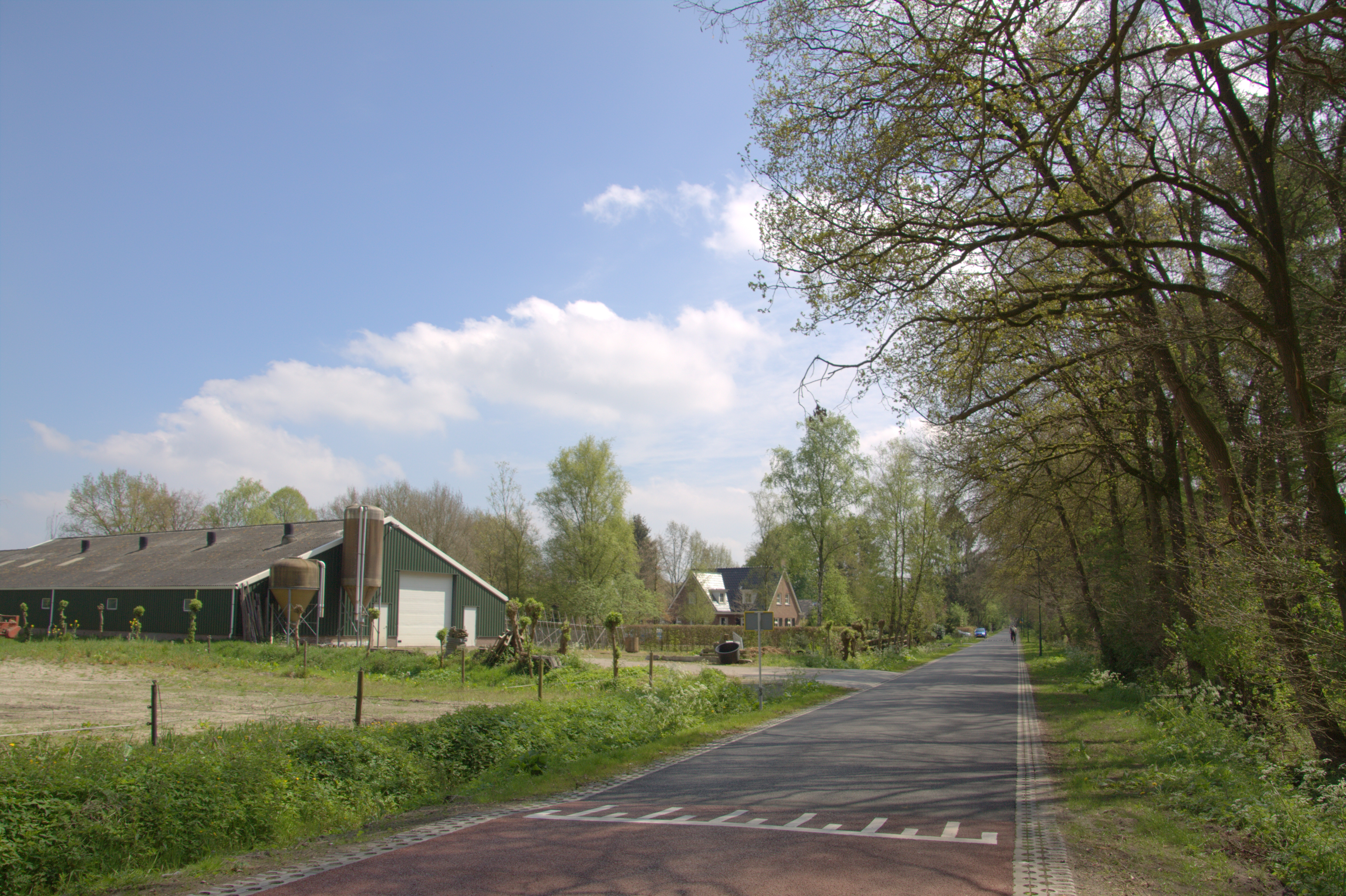
View near hamlets of Wieksloot and Hees

== See also ==
- Patientia Vincit Omnia
