= Ina Isings =

Archaeologist of Egypt

Clasina Isings
- Born: 15 February 1919; Soest, Netherlands
- Died: 3 September 2018 (aged 99); Bilthoven

Academic work
- Discipline: Archaeology
- Sub-discipline: Roman archaeology
- Institutions: Society for Arts and Sciences (Utrecht); University of Utrecht

Clasina (Ina) Isings (15 February 1919 - 3 September 2018) was a Dutch archaeologist and classical scholar specialising in Roman glass.

In 2009 the city of Utrecht awarded her a silver medal in recognition of the work she had done to help preserve the city's history.

== Select publications ==
- Isings, C. 1957. Roman glass from dated finds (Archaeologica traiectina, 2). Groningen.
- Isings, C. 1964. Some late Roman glass fragments from Rome. New York, Gordon and Breach.
- Isings, C. 1971. Roman Glass in Limburg. Groningen, Wolters-Noordhoff Publishing.
- Isings, C. 1972. Voorromeins en romeins glas in het Gemeentelijk Oudheidkundig Museum te Heerlen. Heerlen, Gemeentelijk Oudheidkundig Museum.
- Zandstra, M., Polak, M., and Isings, C. et al. 2012. De Romeinse versterkingen in Vechten-Fectio: het archeologisch onderzoek in 1946-1947. Nijmegen, Auxilia.
