= Soester Dunes =

Nature reserve in the Netherlands

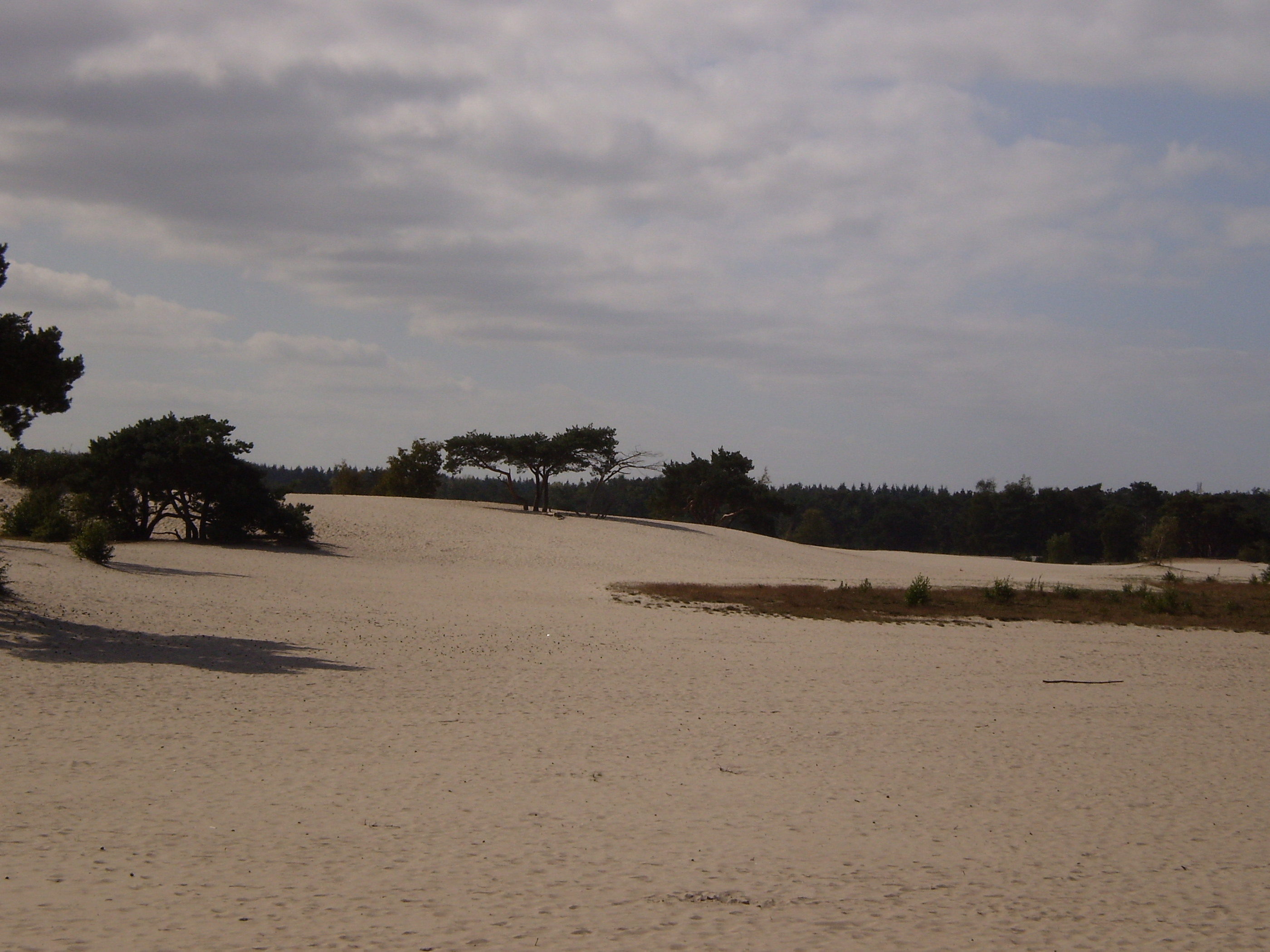

Geography
- Area: 5 km^{2} (1.9 sq mi)
- Country: Nederlands
- State: Utrecht (province)
- Coordinates: 52°9′11″N 5°17′49″E

The Soester Dunes (Dutch: Soester Duinen) is a nature reserve in the municipality Soest in the Dutch province Utrecht. The area is characterized by extensive sand drifts, which also consists of heather areas and forests, forming part of the northern edge of the Utrecht Hill Ridge. The area was usually officially designated in literature as De Lange Duinen en de Korte Duinen ("The Long Dunes and the Short Dunes"). The Soester Dunes have an area of approximately 500 ha.

== Location ==
The Soester Dunes are located south of the village of Soest. The southern boundary is formed by the railway from Utrecht to Amersfoort. The Long Dunes and Short Dunes are divided by Provincial road 413 (from Soest to Soesterberg), the Long Dunes to the west and the Short Dunes to the east.

== History ==
The Utrecht Hill Ridge (Dutch: Utrechtse Heuvelrug) is a lateral moraine formed during the Saale glaciation. In the warmer Eemien period following the Saale, the Netherlands was almost entirely covered with deciduous trees. This interglacial ended about 80,000 years ago with the onset of the Weichselian glaciation. During this ice age, sea levels fell sharply and there was no land ice in the Netherlands. There was an extreme climate where the soil was completely frozen, all vegetation disappeared, and the wind was given free rein. Leeward of the ridge, on the northeast side, thick sand packages were deposited by the prevailing west wind.

During the Holocene period, from about 8,000 years BCE., the climate gradually became warmer and wetter. Initially birch and coarse pine trees settled, followed by deciduous forests, and the Utrecht Hill Ridge became overgrown.

When the human population grew in the Middle Ages, the forest disappeared. The main causes were logging and intensive grazing, especially by sheep. In places where grazing was very intense, drifting sands were created in the Late Middle Ages. Nothing grew there and the wind was given free rein again.

The drifting sand of the Soester Dunes was sometimes a problem for farmers in adjacent areas, for example in the hamlet De Birkt between Amersfoort and Soest. Wood walls were constructed to protect their farmlands from sand.

When the sheep of the Utrecht Hill Ridge disappeared, the heath gradually turned back into forest in many places and the drifting sands also became partly overgrown again. In addition, in the mid-twentieth century coarse pines planted.

=== Archaeology ===
A flint arrow spire dating from the last phase of the Weichsel Ice Age has been found in the Long Dunes. Presumably there were approximately 11,000 - 10,000 BC. Chr. paleolithic reindeer hunters of the Hamburg culture. A complex flint tool from the area was also found in the area Younger culture (approximately 10,000 - 9,000 BC. Chr.). These finds date from the Allerød interstadial, a warmer period, in which the tundra had made way for birch and pine forests, and was hunted for primeval cattle, moose and deer.

== Geographic Monument ==
Since 1967, the two dunes have been National Heritage sites:

- In the Long Dunes the national monument no. 45995: remains of prehistoric habitation, in which at least seven Mesolithic flint workshops and some sites of the young Paleolithic Hamburg culture and the Tjonger culture have been found.
- In the Short Dunes the national monument no. 45996: remains of prehistoric habitation and flint workshops.

The Long and Short Dunes are the largest and last more or less open sand drifts on the Utrecht Hill Ridge. Places where sand can still dust freely are rare in the Netherlands. This makes the Soester Dunes one geography valuable area. In 1997, the Long and Short Dunes were declared a geographic monument by the province of Utrecht.

In 2006, a major recovery operation called “Let it blow ” was initiated to guarantee the survival of the special ecological and earth-bound ecological and earth values. The southwestern part has been opened in both the Long Dunes and the Short Dunes. A few hectares of forest have been cut and teased, creating open sand again. This has been done in different ways, sometimes a bit larger, sometimes a bit smaller. Scattered bushes and storage of trees and shrubs have been removed on the remaining heather areas. This gives the wind enough power to lift and move sand.

== Flora and fauna ==
=== Birds ===
One of the most characteristic bird species of sand drifts was the tawny pipit. In 1925 this species was common in the dunes near Soest, described in 1928 the dune pipit as numerous. In 1953, nests were found. A breeding case was also diagnosed in 1955. A few more were seen in 1959 and a one was also observed in the area on April 30, 1961. After that, the species was no longer observed.

Today, notable bird species include the European nightjar and woodlark.

=== Plants ===
The most characteristic plants of the drifting sands are the scattered juniper bushes. Sixteen species of soil-growing lichens have also been found in the old heath of the Long Dunes, four of which are endangered: green reindeer lichen, open heather tail (Cladonia crispata), olive cup lichen and donkey leg (Cladonia zopfii).

Oak trunks are located in the northern part of the Short Dunes. These are clusters of irregularly shaped oak trunks created by spraying. Oak bushes were buried by the drifting sand; the buried branches made new roots and the take ends grew into trunkswhich were caught the drifting sand. As a result, the oaks were placed on a hill. The oaks contain twenty types of epiphytic (crust) mosses: mosses and lichens that grow on branches and trunks. One of those species is a rare species beard moss. The trunks also contain many mushrooms, including rooster comb. Elsewhere in the Soester Dunes can be found surprise webcap, olive-brown waxy cap, slippery jack, yellow knight and white-brown knight.

=== Invertebrates ===
Bees and wasps live on the steep edges of the sand drifts. In front of the open and sparsely overgrown parts of the Soester Dunes live the saber ant and the striped earwig. In 2020, a population one-spot thick head moths were discovered.
