= Mirik Milan =

Dutch politician (born 1981)

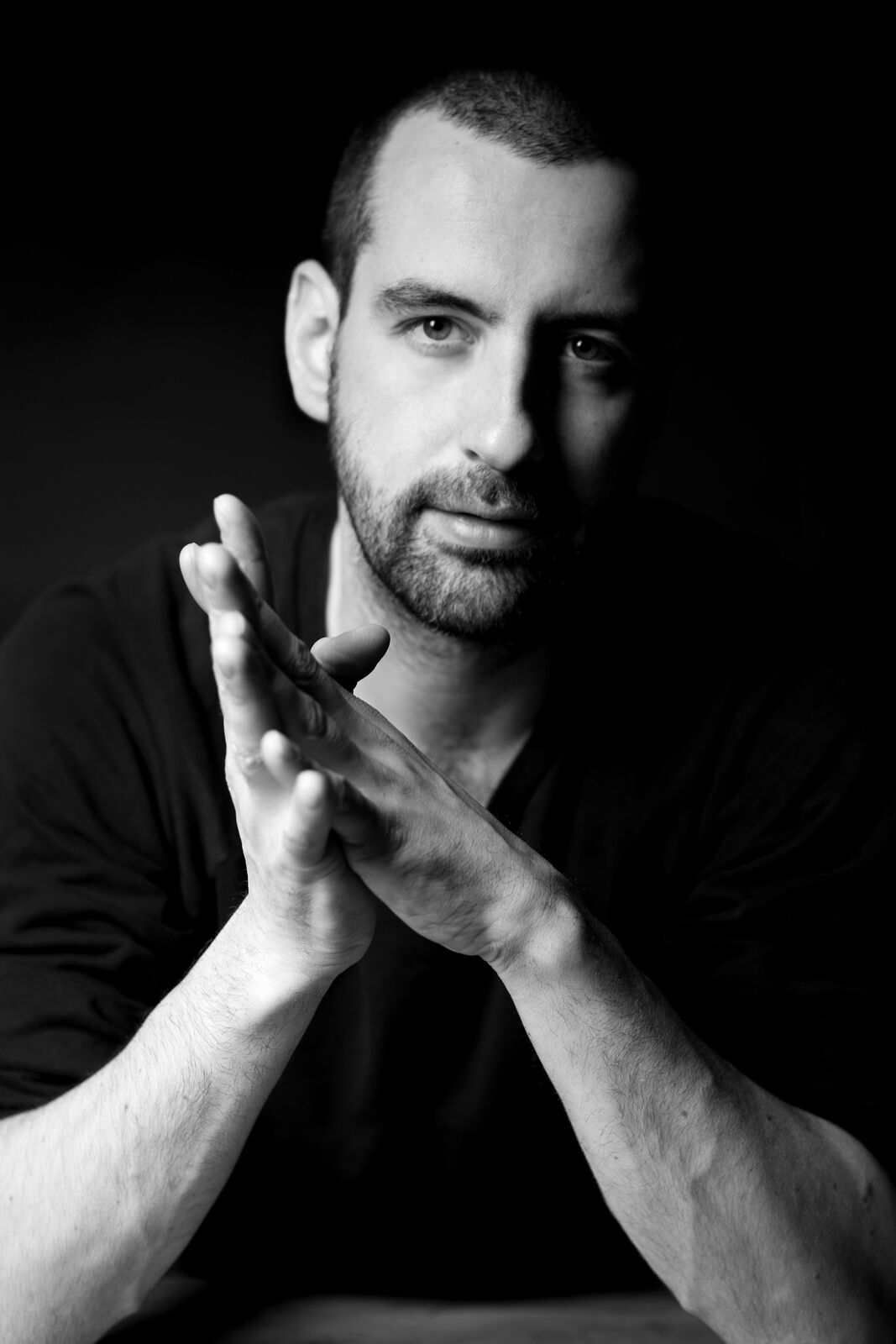

Night Mayor, Amsterdam
- In office 2012–2018

Personal details
- Born: 1981 (age 44–45) Soest, Netherlands

Mirik Milan (born 1981) is a Dutch politician, the former night mayor of Amsterdam, responsible for launching the independent role, which liaises directly with the municipality. Elected in 2012, Milan worked directly with the nightlife economy in Amsterdam. During his tenure, 24-hour venue permits were granted, and crime around Rembrandtplein square declined. Milan's work has been replicated in places like London, with Mayor Sadiq Khan's 2016 appointment of "night czar" Amy Lamé, and in New York, with Ariel Palitz, in 2018.

== Rembrandtplein Transformation ==
During his time as night mayor, Mirik Milan oversaw the transformation of Amsterdam's Rembrandtplein. The three-year project included making the plaza more accessible to pedestrians, creating a mobile website for managing complaints, and enlisting Rembrandtplein hosts to keep social situations from escalating. Most notably, alcohol-related problems dropped by 25% as a result of Milan's work.

== Creative Footprint & VibeLab ==
In late 2017, Mirik Milan joined Berlin Clubcommission board member, Lutz Leichsenring, in the Creative Footprint not-for-profit initiative. Using data provided by Musicboard Berlin, and Harvard University, Creative Footprint creates a score based on a city's cultural programming, impact, and support from local government. Berlin, for example, achieved a 8.02 out of 10 rating. The data Creative Footprint collects is used to show value of creative spaces and influence civic leaders.

Under the consultancy, VibeLab, Mirik and Lutz compiled the Creative Impact NYC report in September 2018 in conjunction with University of Pennsylvania Researcher Michael Fichman. Among data collected, the study pinpointed NYC's most experimental venues as being located in Ridgewood, Queens and Bushwick South, Brooklyn. The report ranked NYC behind Berlin with a 7.29 out of 10.

== N8BM A'DAM ==
Mirik Milan founded the N8BM A'DAM foundation with Ella Overkleeft and Michiel Friedhoff in 2014. The goal of the organization is to ensure continuity of the night mayor's office while developing new initiatives both directly and indirectly related to Amsterdam nightlife.

== MRKMLN ==
Beginning in 2005, Mirik Milan began working under the name MRKMLN as a nightclub promoter with club nights like RAUW (Amsterdam, Utrecht, Barcelona, and Berlin), where he introduced artists like Erol Alkan, Boys Noize, Justice, Busy P, Crookers, Brodinski, and Gesaffelstein to the Dutch music scene, Night Voyage (Paradiso Amsterdam), and Manifesto. He also handled strategy and production for Nuit Blanche, OFFICE (festival), and Amsterdam Fashion Week, and worked for Vice, the Stedelijk Museum, and Diesel.
