= Soestduinen railway station =

Former railway station in the Netherlands

Soestduinen
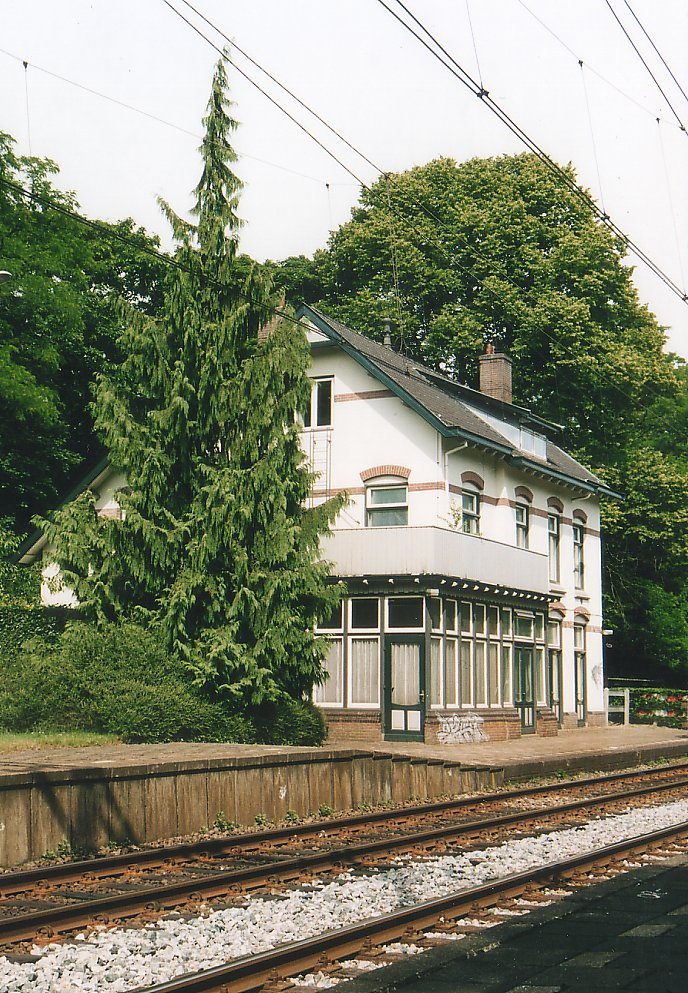

General information
- Location: Netherlands
- Coordinates: 52°8′42″N 5°17′57″E
Location
- Location within Netherlands

Soestduinen was a railway station in the town of Soestduinen, near Amersfoort, Netherlands, used until 1998.

== History ==
The station is on the Centraalspoorweg, the station was also sometimes called Soesterberg. The station opened on 20 August 1863 and was one of the stations with a 'Royal Waiting room'.

After the first world-war, a military airfield was created in the nearby town of Soesterberg. During that time, there was a separate railroad line to the airfield for cargo like ammunition. During those years, there was a 3rd loading platform specifically for moving cargo for the airfield.

Soesterberg area remained an important location military-wise so a big part of the passengers departing and arriving daily on the train station were military or non-military personnel for the various locations. Because of the end of the cold war and the return of the American Contingent from Soesterberg back home, there was less and less need for support staff. The last military users of station Soestduinen were of the 'Luchtmacht Bewakings Corps' (Airforce Guard Corps). When finally the last military installations and facilities were closed, only a small handful of people departed and arrived at Soestduinen train station.

Due to a lack of passengers, because of the remote location of the station, it closed the 24 May 1998. The station remained as it was when it closed, but in 2008 the platforms were finally removed. The station building was put up for sale. It is currently in use as an Italian restaurant.

The Utrecht - Amersfoort - Zwolle local service served the station.

== Usage ==
The station was owned by the Dutch Railways (Nederlandse Spoorwegen). In the steam-age of trains, the station-supervisor lived in the train station. The ground floor of the station was a waiting area and ticket sales. After electrifying that part of the railways, the first and second floor of the station served as normal living area for staff members of the Dutch Railways. The rent was paid to the Dutch Railways, it was not required to actually work on station Soestduinen.

After the last inhabitant moved out of the station (in the middle 1990s), the building remained empty for a long time. The Dutch Railways wanted to sell the property for business use but the changes that had to be done before the rooms were usable were very high. After a couple of years of remaining empty ( ?Anti-kraak ), a business refurbished the inside of the station to make it ready for their business.

In 2015, the building was split again into two parts, with, in 2016, an Italian restaurant on the ground floor.

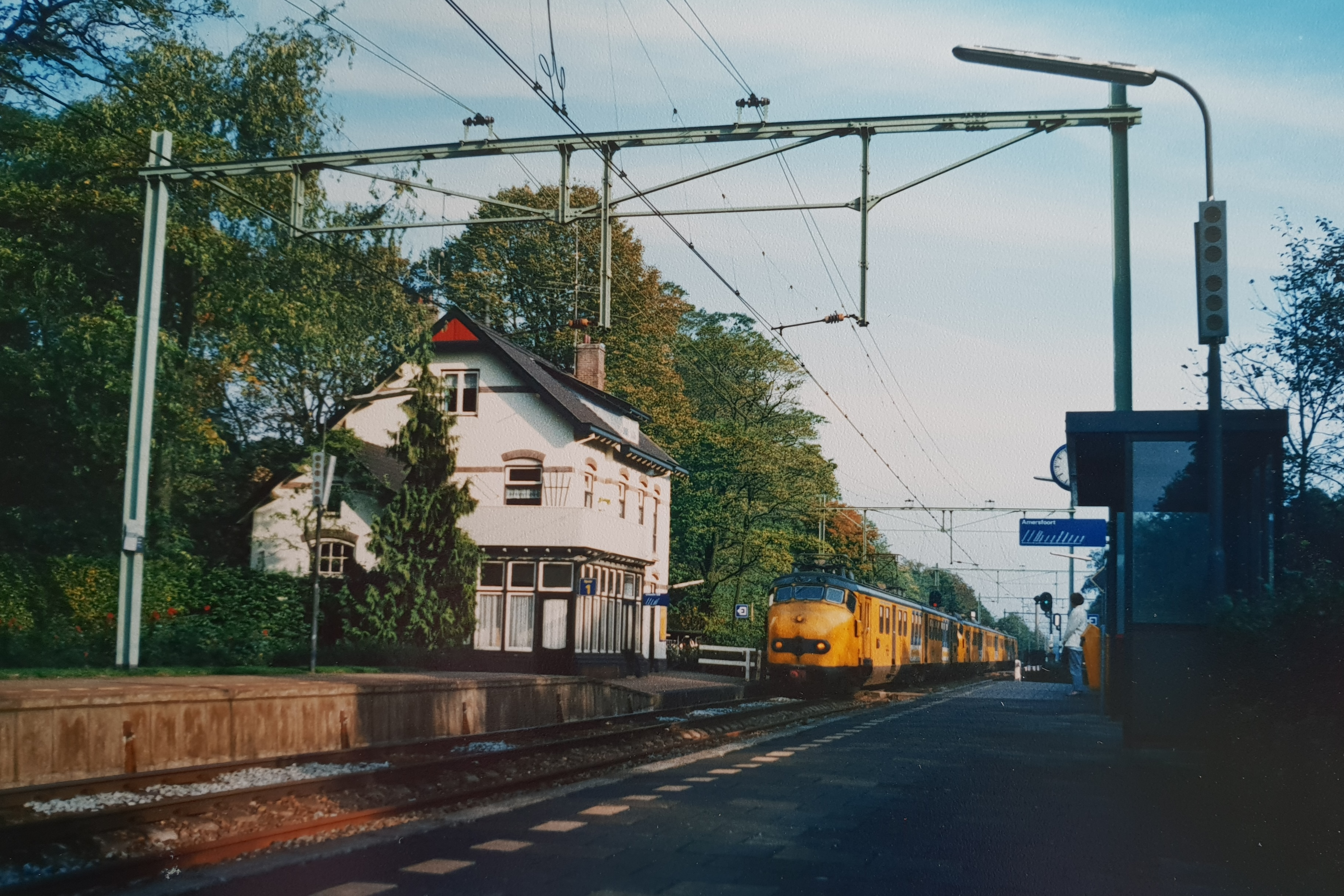
Station Soestduinen with Mat '54 ("Puppy Head") train in 1987

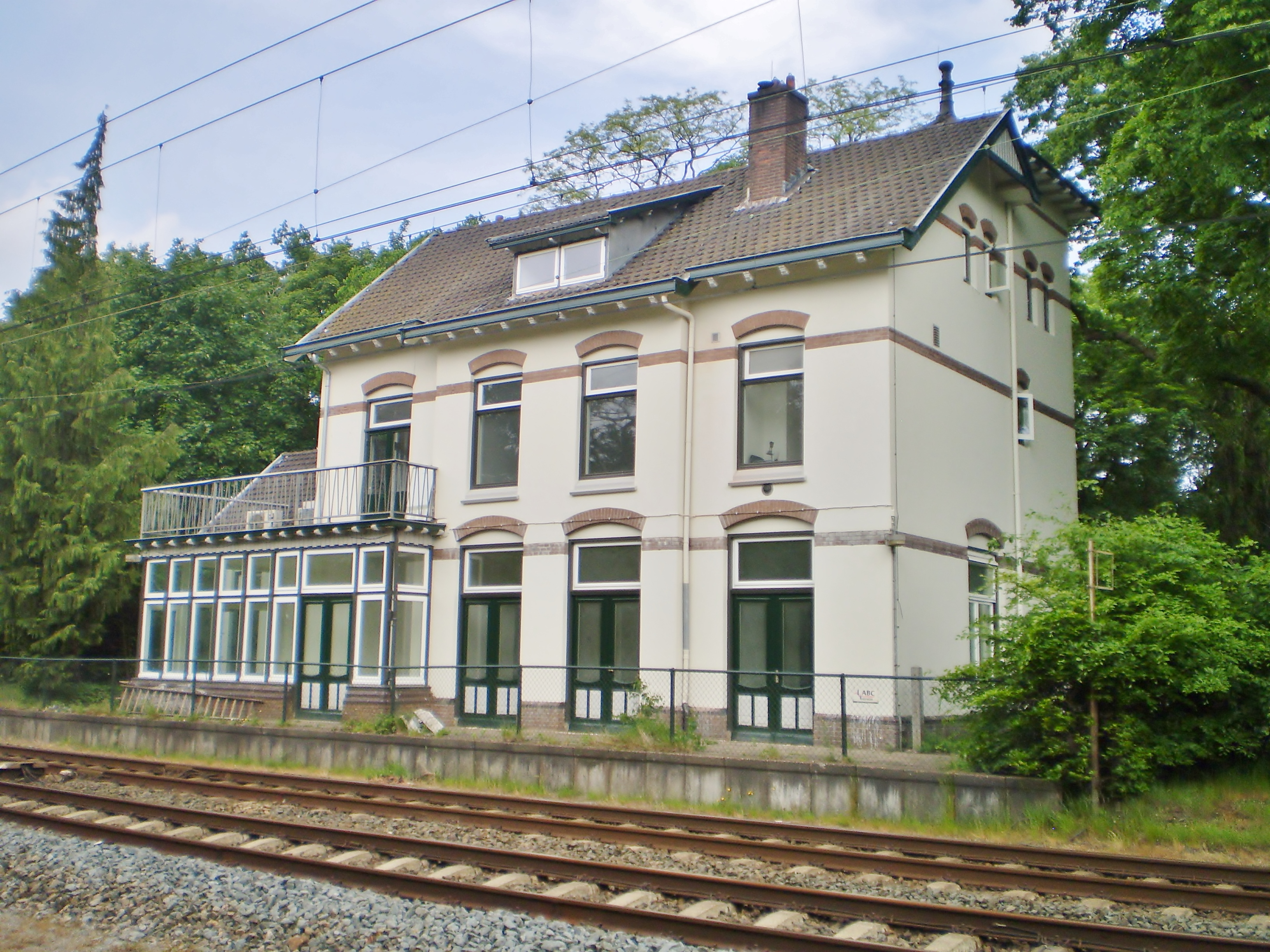
Soestduinen in 2014
