= Patientia Vincit Omnia =

Musical society in Soest, province of Utrecht, Netherlands

Patientia Vincit Omnia (PVO) is a musical society in Soest, in the Dutch province of Utrecht.

== History of the Group ==
The group was originally formed as a fanfare in 1898, in honor of the inauguration of Queen Wilhelmina. The name, Patientia Omnia Vincit (Patience Conquers All) was selected by the principal of the Catholic school, Mr. Van Eindthoven.

After 25 years, it was decided the group should become a band, with brass, percussion, and woodwinds joining the orchestra. The change was well received within the Soest community. The Soester Courant wrote about the first act as Wind Orchestra: "In a crowded room with a Rembrandt grateful audience gave us a Fanfare Corps Friday, February 8th a brilliant performance".

The next extension of the association took place in 1969, when a majorette group, minirettegroep and a color guard were added. These groups were retired in 1997 due to a lack of enthusiasm.

== PVO's Own Building ==
From its creation, PVO had led a nomadic life, with rehearsal rooms spread throughout the town. This came to an end in 1974, with the purchase of a former cinema, later used as a church building of the Apostolic Society. After a thorough renovation, the building was transformed into a complete home for the association, with a large hall, small rehearsal studios, a meeting room, music library and a bar.

== Jubilees ==
In 1999, the group celebrated its 100-year anniversary with a 24-hour music marathon. In commemoration of the event, the group was awarded the Royal Musical Society Honorary Medal. In 2004, a musical evening highlights, organized in collaboration with a number of cultural associations from Soest. Partly because of that year PFS was the winner of the Cultural Award of the municipality of Soest, an accomplishment Big Band Blow, part of the association, repeated in 2008.

PVO's performances in 2009 are entirely devoted to the 110th anniversary of the association. Including a concert with the Westlands male voice and a concert with singer Gé Reinders passed the Revue. At the last concert also musical GA Heinze from Muiderberg and music squad Nardinc from Naarden officials.

== Parts of the Association ==
- Band
- Students Orchestra
- "The Eemlander Blaaskapel", an orchestra specializing in Egerlander music
- Big Band Blow
- Dweilorkest WBAWWW ("Wij Bloaze Als Wat Wij Wille") Dweilorkest WBAWWW ( "We Bloaze If what we want")
- Occasional Brass Quintet, a quartet of brass
- Percussion
- Recorder Group "The Block Pipits"
- Coverband R9 (Formerly the PPC: PVO's Party Combo)
