= Klaarwater, Soest =

Neighborhood of Soest, Netherlands

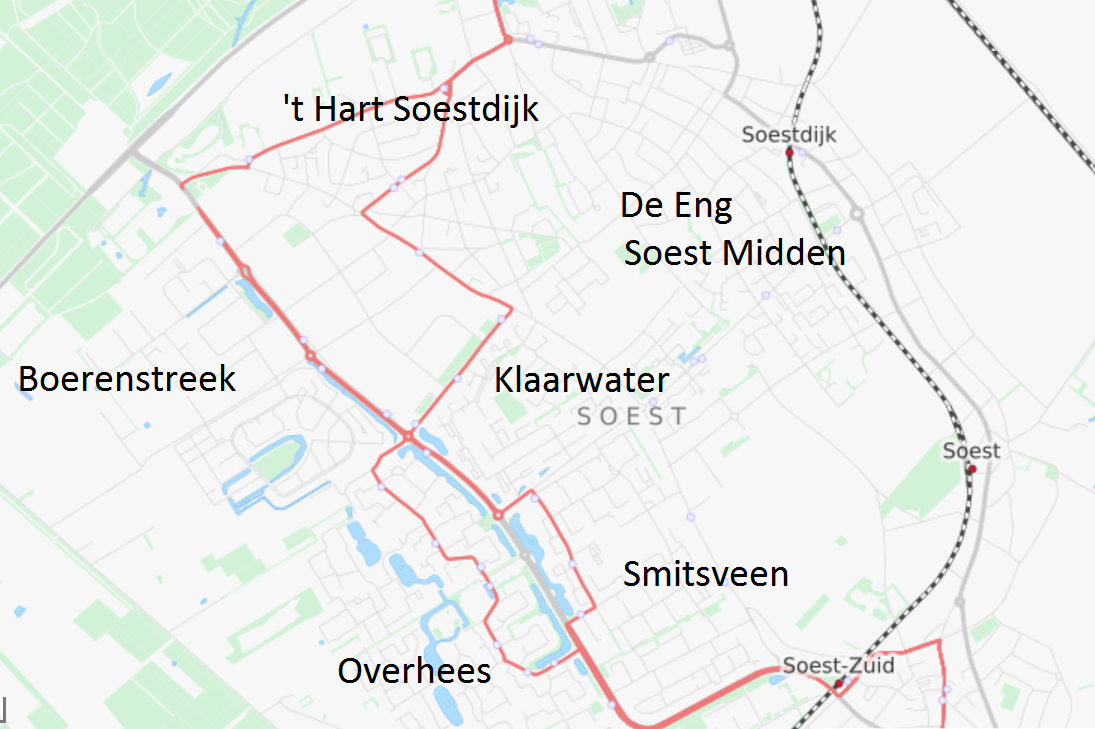
Neighborhood division of Soest

Klaarwater is a residential area in Soest, Netherlands. The neighborhood lies between the Koningsweg, Beukenlaan, Dalweg and Vrijheidsweg.

Klaarwater was built between 1960 and 1975. There are about 3,300 people living here. There are a few flats on the Koningsweg and Dalweg, and also between the Wiardi Beckmanstraat and Vrijheidsweg. In the middle of the district there is a park Honsbergen, which was put there in the 1970s. In the bottom of the flat called Honsbergen is a Multi-Functional Centre. There is also a small shopping centre, which for the biggest part is the supermarket, called Hoogvliet. There aren't just flats, there are also many terraced houses. There is also a pond by the Koningsweg. This is a fishing pond, for the inhabitants of the area. The neighborhood had a 'neighborhood resident team' that helped in the area by for example planting some bushes or taking care of the park. This was killed off by the municipality as they didn't keep up the funding.
