= Night mayor (municipal title) =

Municipal title

Night Mayor (originally Dutch: Nachtburgemeester) is a municipal title used for someone who represents and helps develop a city's nightlife. The earliest known use of the title was in Rotterdam, Netherlands.

== History ==
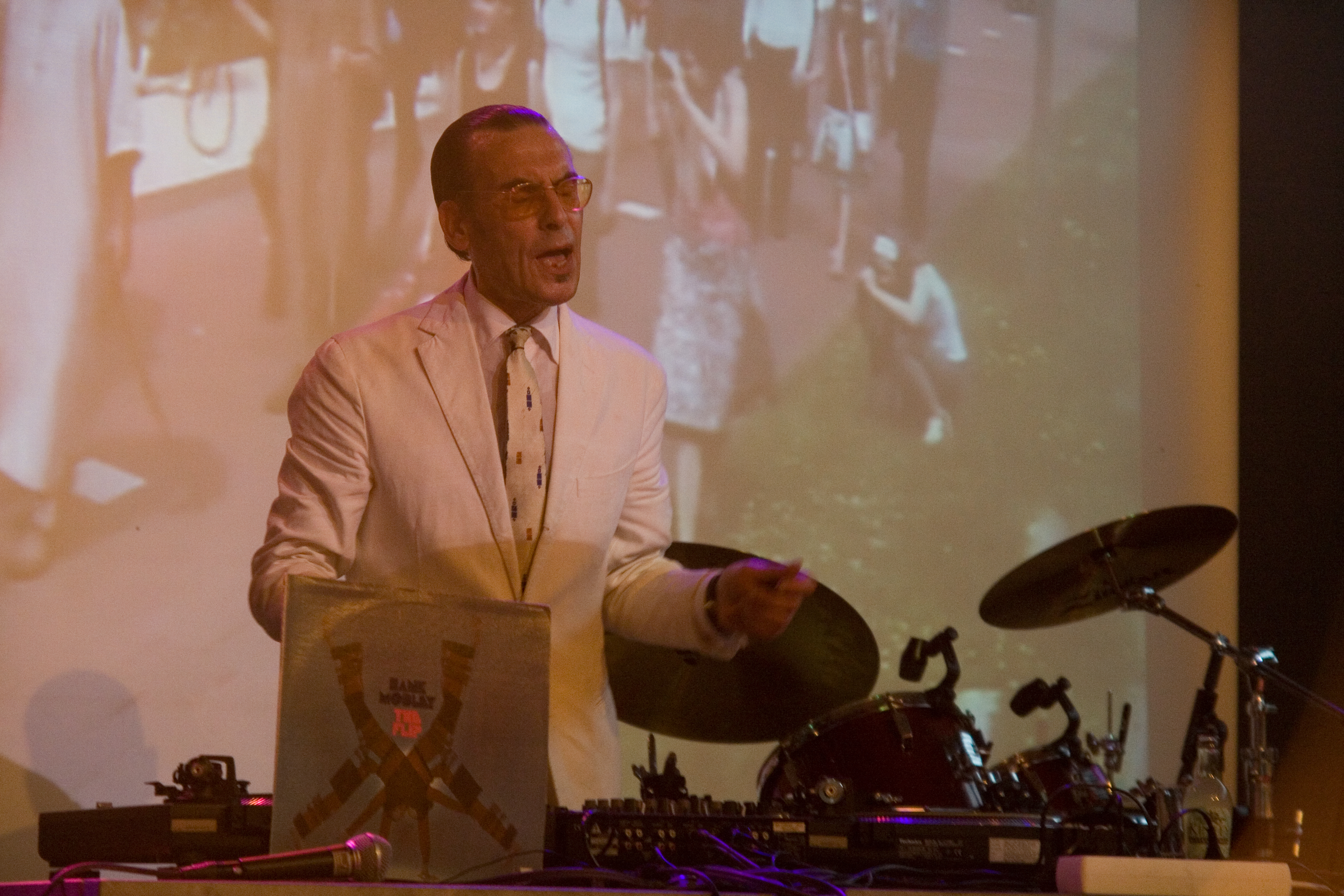
Poet and performer Jules Deelder, who was nicknamed the "night mayor" of Rotterdam in the 1970s.

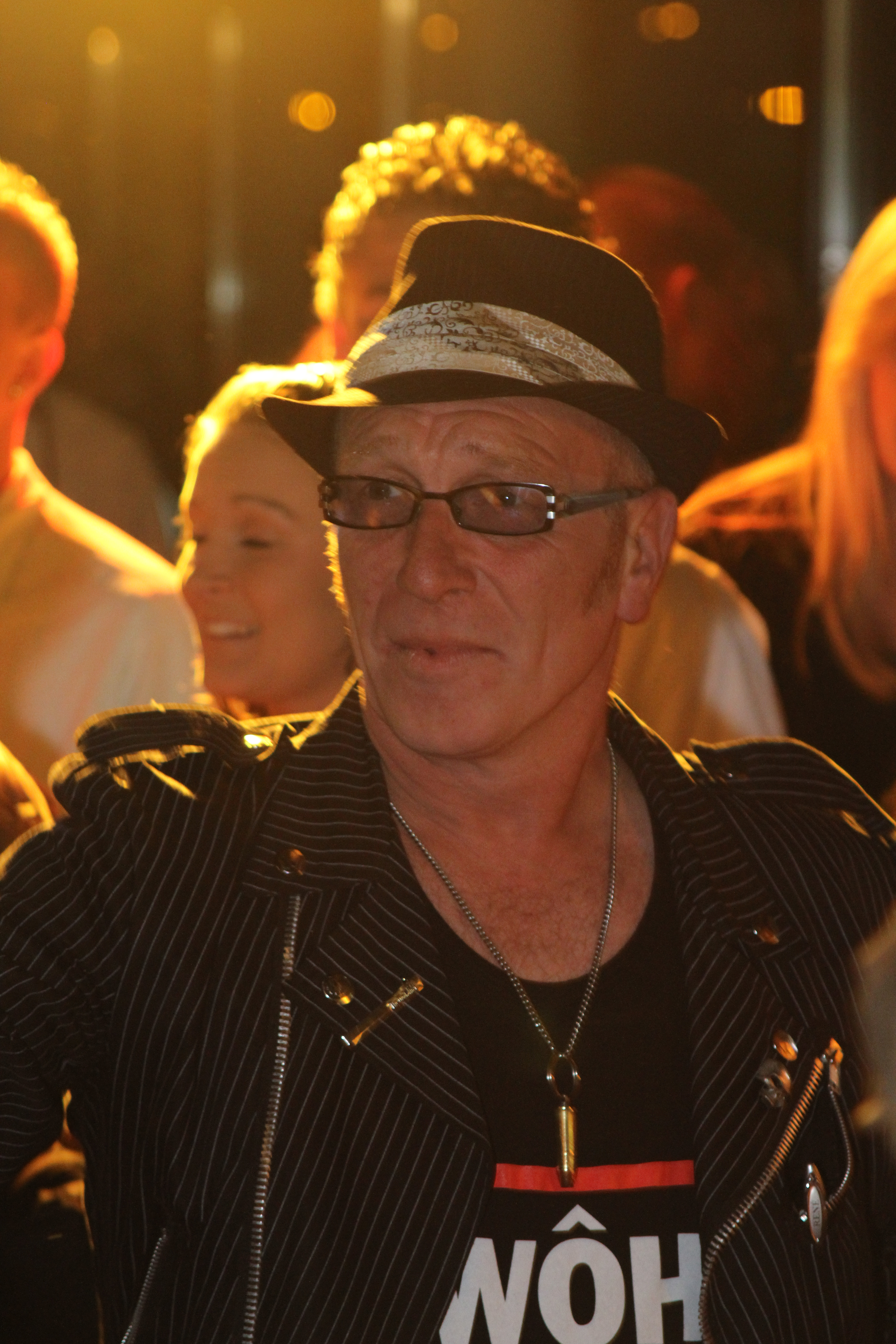
René Bom, night mayor of The Hague, at a ceremonial film premiere.

The expression "night mayor" has been traced in scholarship to earlier usages and analogues. Medieval Latin sources are described as using the term proconsul nocturnus, and early modern English writing (including Thomas Dekker) is discussed as referring to a comparable office of a night watchman. The title night mayor is also reported as appearing in the United States in the 19th century.

The earliest known use of the title in its modern civic/nightlife-advocacy sense is commonly linked to Rotterdam, where Deelder acquired the nickname in the 1970s before it was later adopted more formally.

In Amsterdam, the first election night connected with the title took place at Paradiso on 19 February 2003, and the jury selected the collective De Nachtwacht as the city's first night mayor (with a multi-person collective taking up the role). The position later evolved from a civic initiative into a more structured form of nocturnal governance; one overview of European practice notes that Amsterdam's first night mayor was elected in 2003 and that the role subsequently became linked to an independent non-profit foundation that advises the mayor and city council on night-time issues, while also supporting pilot projects (including work around Rembrandtplein).

Following elections held at Melkweg in 2012, the role was held by Mirik Milan. In 2014, Milan co-founded the non-profit Stichting N8BM A’DAM (Night Mayor Foundation), together with Michiel Friedhoff and Ella Overkleeft, in order to institutionalise and professionalise the title and to coordinate between the municipal government and night-time stakeholders such as venues, festivals, and local businesses. Milan announced his departure in 2016, and a successor was elected in 2018.

Since 2016, Amsterdam's night mayor organisation has hosted the Night Mayor Summit, bringing together night-time governance representatives from other cities. Amsterdam's approach is widely described as influential in the spread of comparable roles elsewhere, including in cities such as Paris, Zürich, London and New York.

A number of cities have adopted different institutional names for similar functions. In London, the Mayor of London appointed a Night Czar and established a Night Time Commission. In New York City, the function is organised through the Mayor's Office of Media and Entertainment as the Office of Nightlife.

== Around the world ==
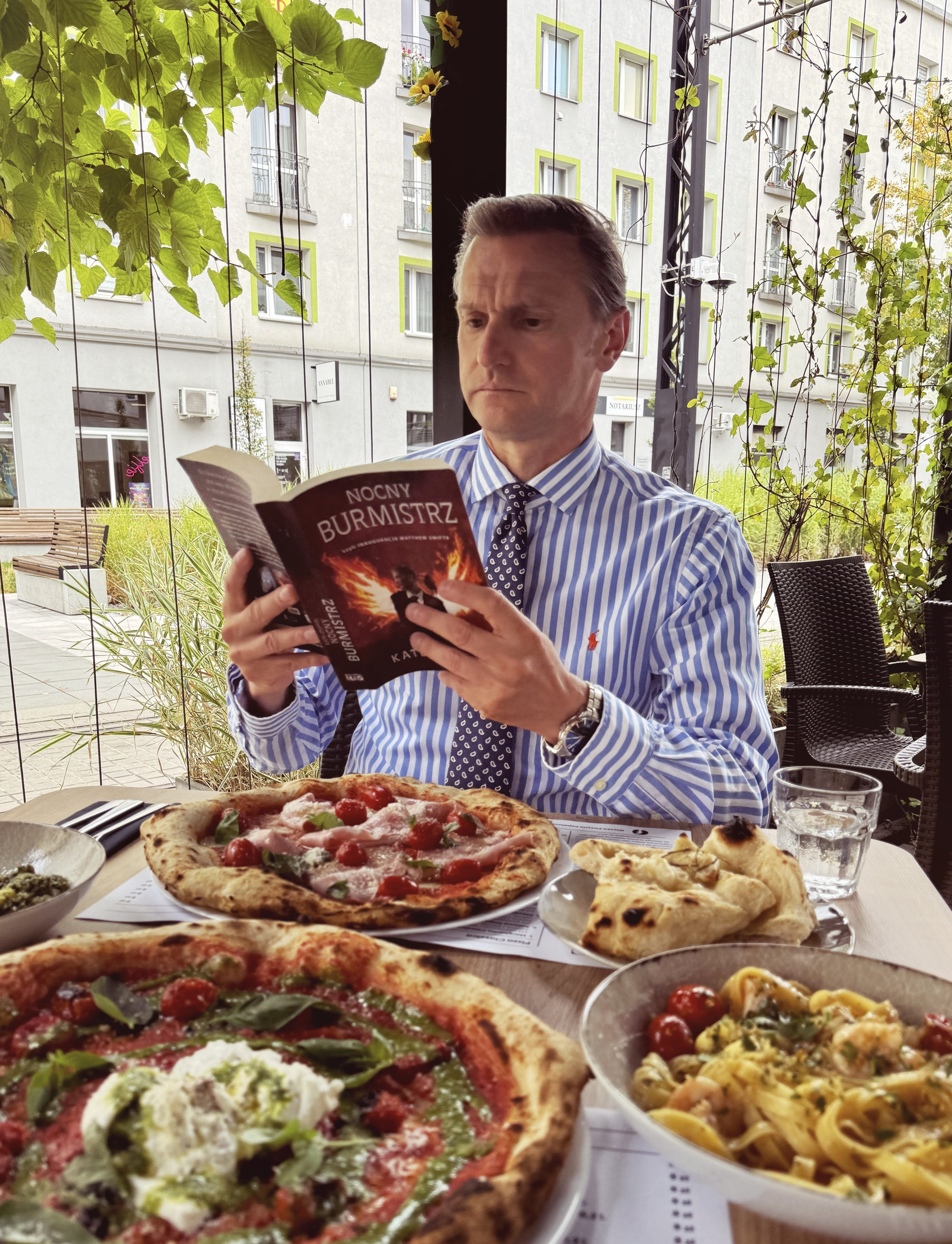
Rafał Siciński - the night mayor of the city of Sosnowiec reads a novel by Kate Griffin titled Night Mayor

=== Europe ===
- Amsterdam, Netherlands: informal collective since 2003, institutionalised since 2014, the first in the world.
- Belfast, Northern Ireland: since 2024, with Michael Stewart as the first Night Czar
- London, England: since 2016, with Amy Lamé as the first Night Czar. Mirik Milan was invited in 2015 by the London government for advice on the position.
- Mannheim, Germany: since 2018, the first in Germany.
- Prague, Czech Republic: since 2019.
- Manchester, England: Sacha Lord is the Night Time Economy Adviser for Greater Manchester, appointed by Mayor Andy Burnham in 2018.
- Sosnowiec, Poland: since 2023, the first in Poland.
- Kraków, Poland: since 2024.

=== Latin America ===
- Cali, Colombia: since 2016, the first in Latin America.

=== North America ===
- Syracuse, New York, US: since 2026.
- Ottawa, Canada: since 2024.
- Washington DC, US: since 2018.
- Boston, USA: since 2023.

=== Russia ===
- Ulyanovsk, Russia since 2019, the first in Russia.
