= Strepsilin =

Chemical compound found in lichens

- Chemical structure of strepsilin

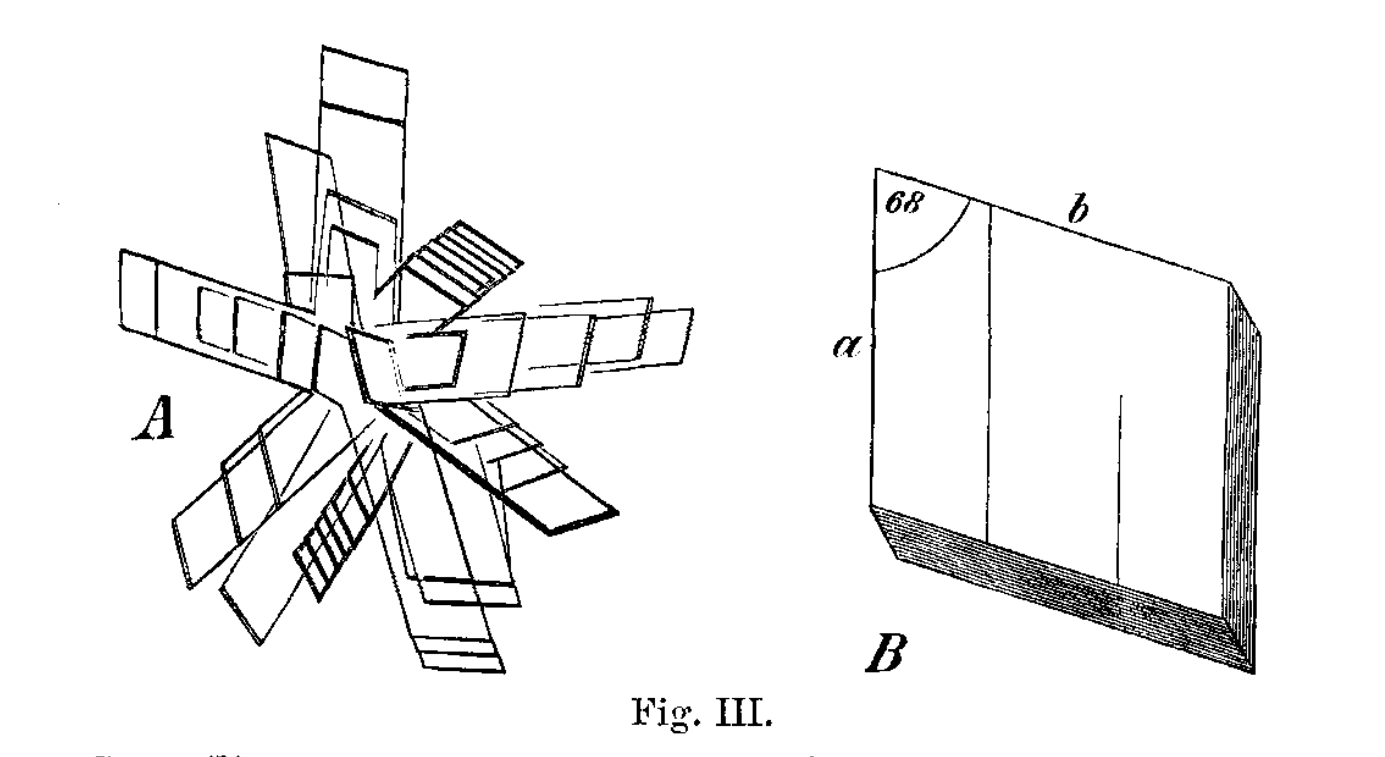
- A crystal cluster of strepsilin; B single crystal

Names
- IUPAC name 4,8-Dihydroxy-10-methyl-1H-[2]benzofuro[5,4-b][1]benzofuran-3-one

Identifiers
3D model (JSmol)	Interactive image
ChEBI	CHEBI:144305
ChemSpider	78436109
PubChem CID	12443050
- InChI: InChI=1S/C15H10O5/c1-6-2-7(16)3-10-12(6)14-8-5-19-15(18)13(8)9(17)4-11(14)20-10/h2-4,16-17H,5H2,1H3 Key: OOXFLIUVCWLPKE-UHFFFAOYSA-N
- SMILES: CC1=CC(=CC2=C1C3=C(O2)C=C(C4=C3COC4=O)O)O

Properties
Chemical formula	C_{15}H_{10}O_{5}
Molar mass	270.24 g/mol
Melting point	324 °C (615 °F; 597 K)
- Except where otherwise noted, data are given for materials in their standard state (at 25 °C [77 °F], 100 kPa). Infobox references

Strepsilin is a chemical found in lichens. It produces an emerald green colour in the C test. It is a dibenzofuran dimer, with hydroxy, oxy and methyl side groups. It is named after Cladonia strepsilis. Strepsilin was discovered by Wilhelm Zopf in 1903. The structure of strepsilin was determined by Shoji Shibata.

== Properties ==
Strepsilin is degraded in alkali to 1-methyl-3,7-dihydroxydibenzofuran.

Strepsilin melts at 324 °C.

== Occurrence ==
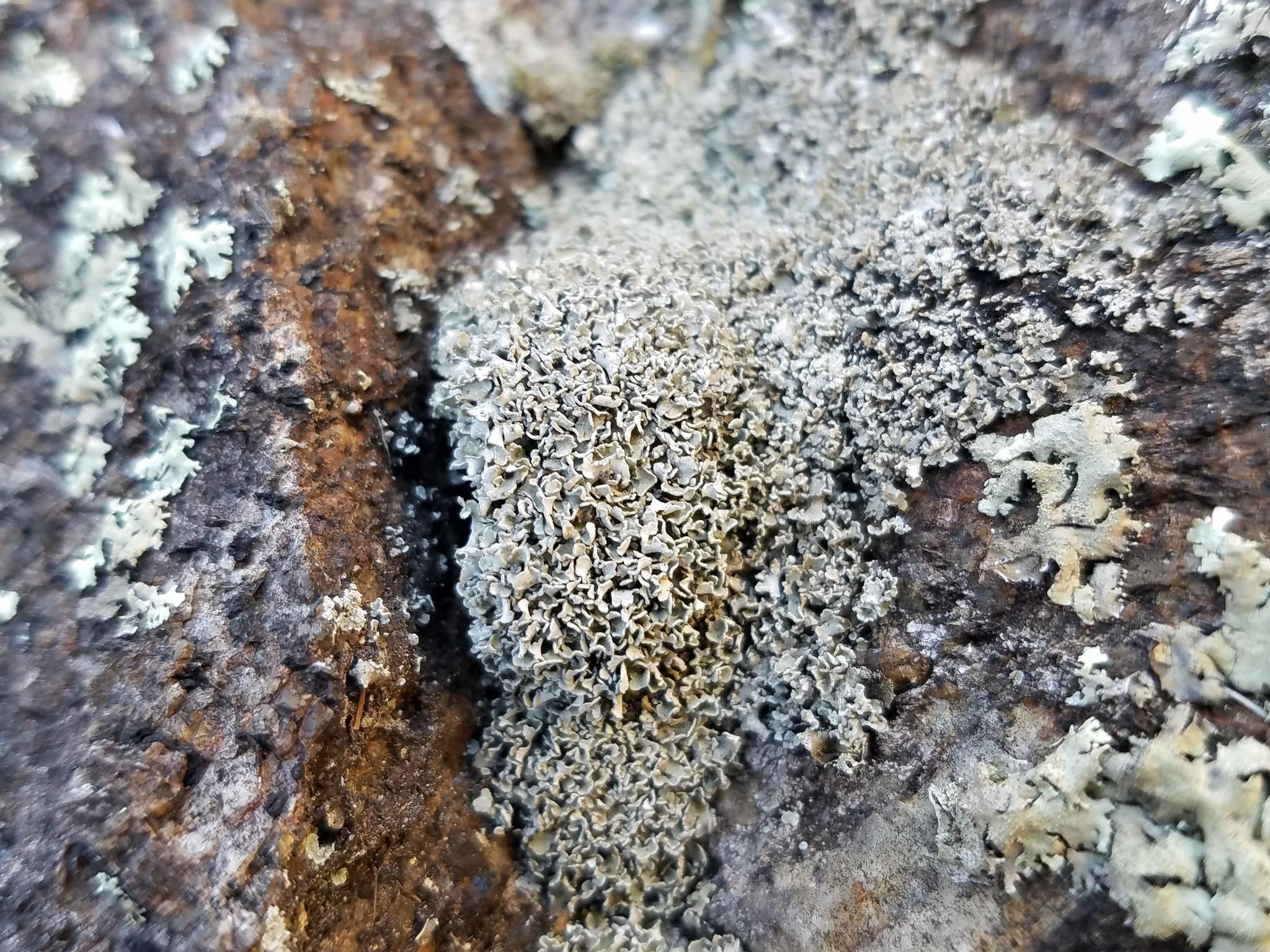
Cladonia strepsilis, the lichen that contains strepsilin

Strepsilin is found in some Cladonia species. It is also found in Siphula and Stereocaulon azoreum.
