= Soestduinen =

- Hamlet
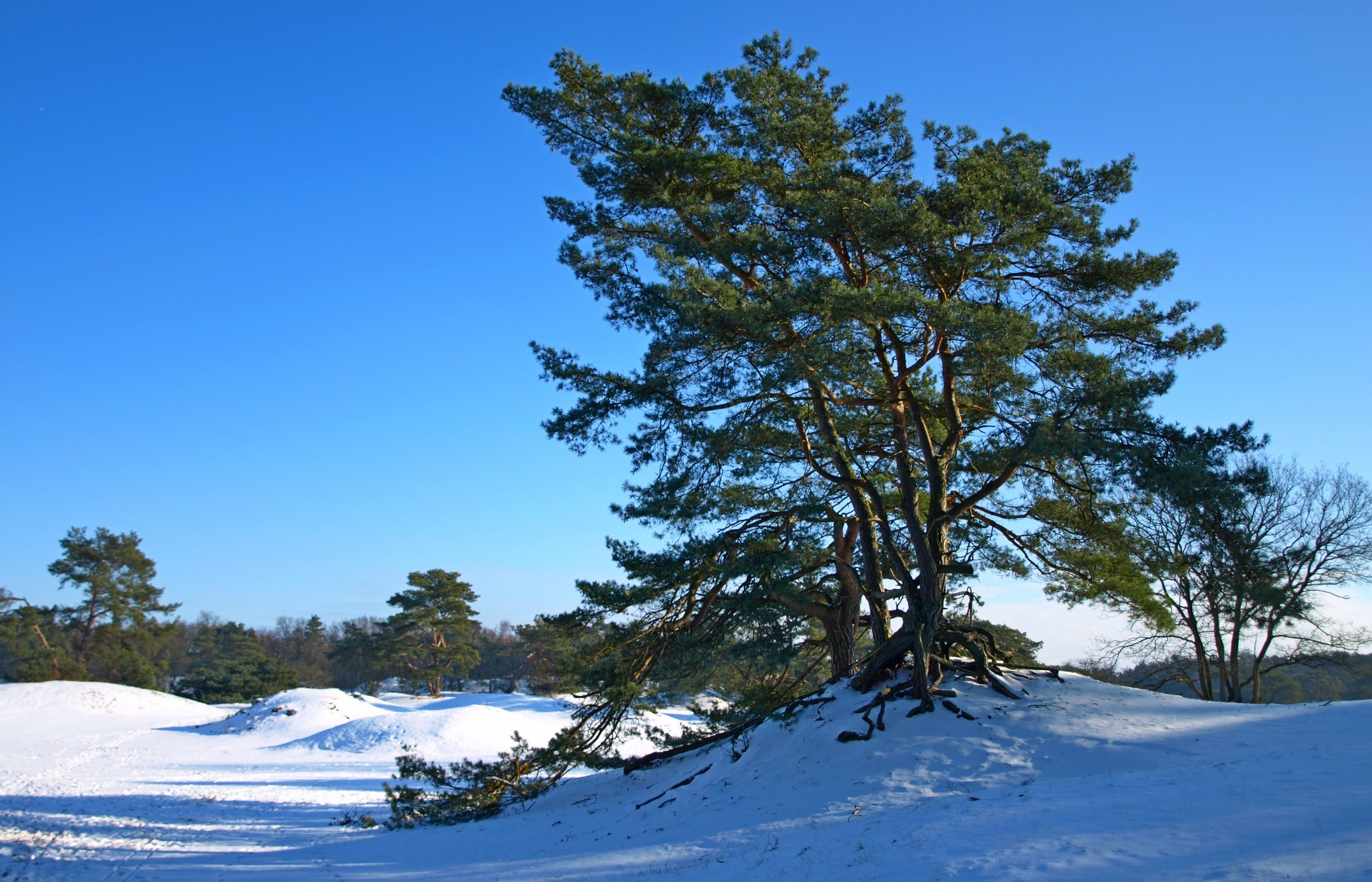
- The dunes covered in snow

- Location in the Netherlands Soestduinen (Netherlands)
- Coordinates: 52°8′45″N 5°17′55″E
- Country: Netherlands
- Province: Utrecht
- Municipality: Soest

Area
  - Total: 2.33 km^{2} (0.90 sq mi)
- Elevation: 5 m (16 ft)

Population (2021)
  - Total: 170
  - Density: 73/km^{2} (190/sq mi)
- Time zone: UTC+1 (CET)
  - Summer (DST): UTC+2 (CEST)
- Postal code: 3768
- Dialing code: 0346

Soestduinen is a hamlet in the Dutch province of Utrecht. It is a part of the municipality of Soest, and lies about 3 km south of Soest.

The hamlet was first mentioned in 1936 as Soestduinen, and means the dunes near Soest. The railway station Soestduinen existed between 1863 and 1998, and was called Soestduinen since 1922. The hamlet has always had place name signs, but since 2009, it reads Soest with Soestduinen underneath to emphasise that it is a hamlet belonging to Soest.

== Gallery ==
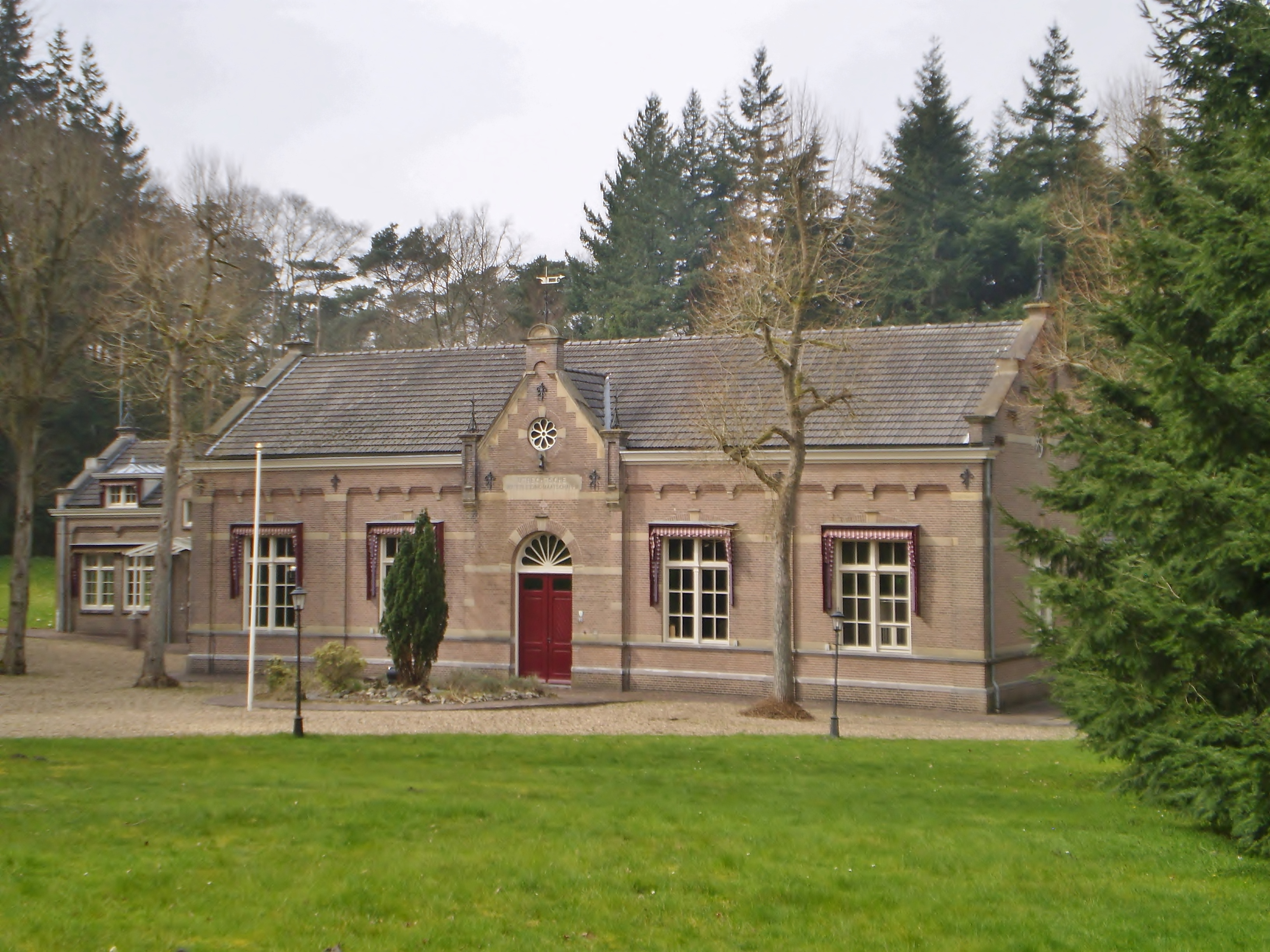
Pumping station

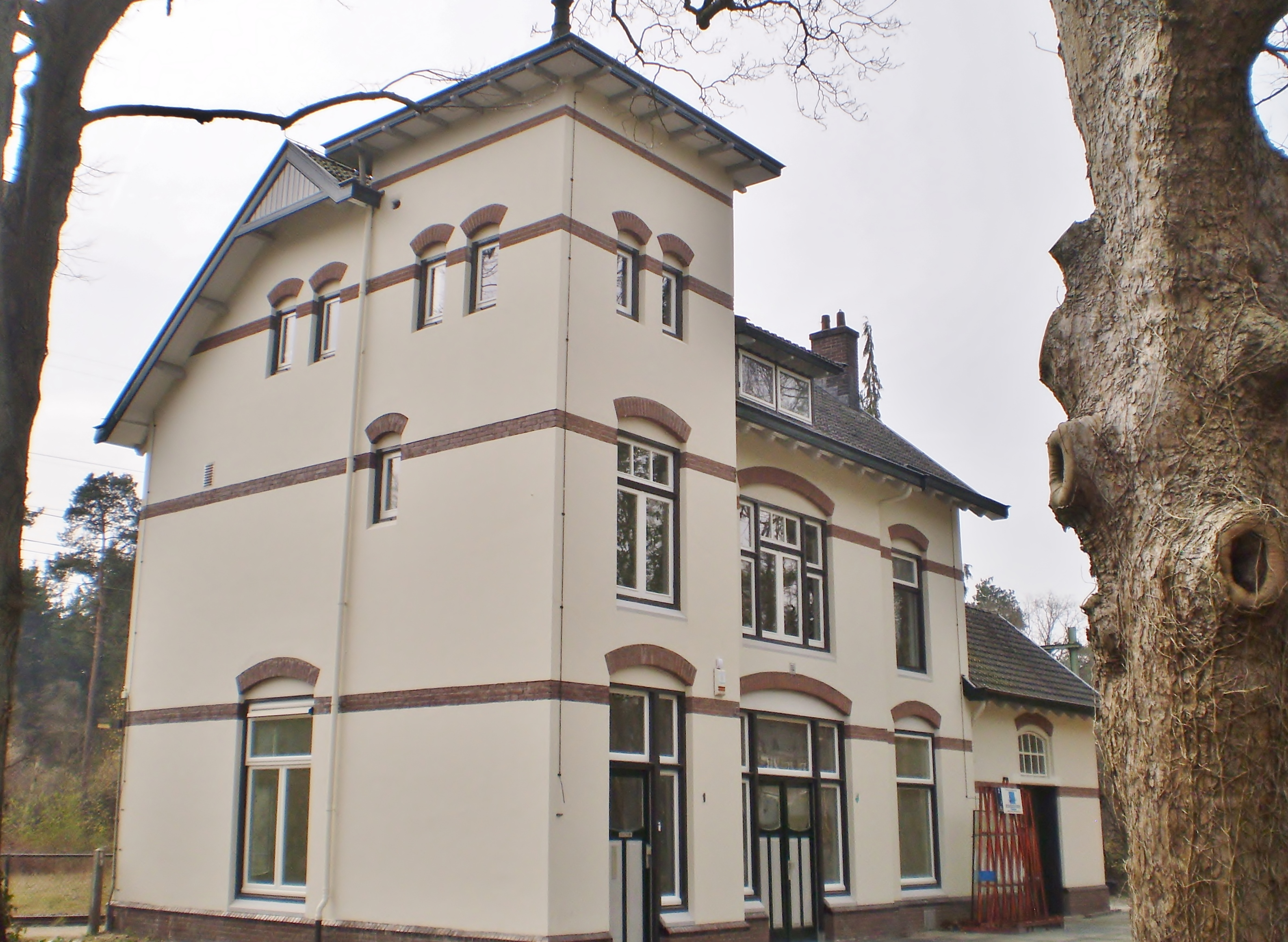
Former railway station building

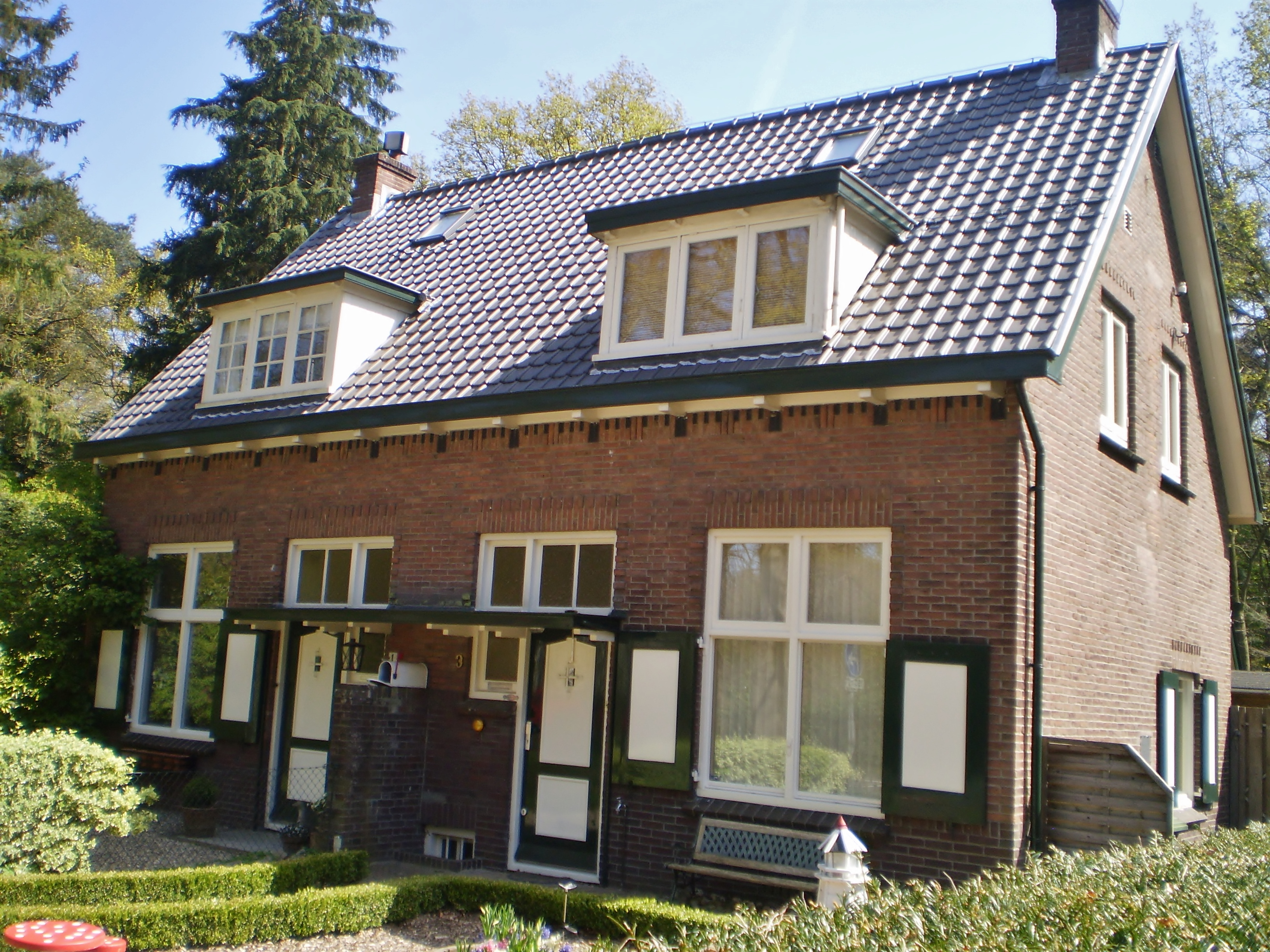
Houses in Soestduinen

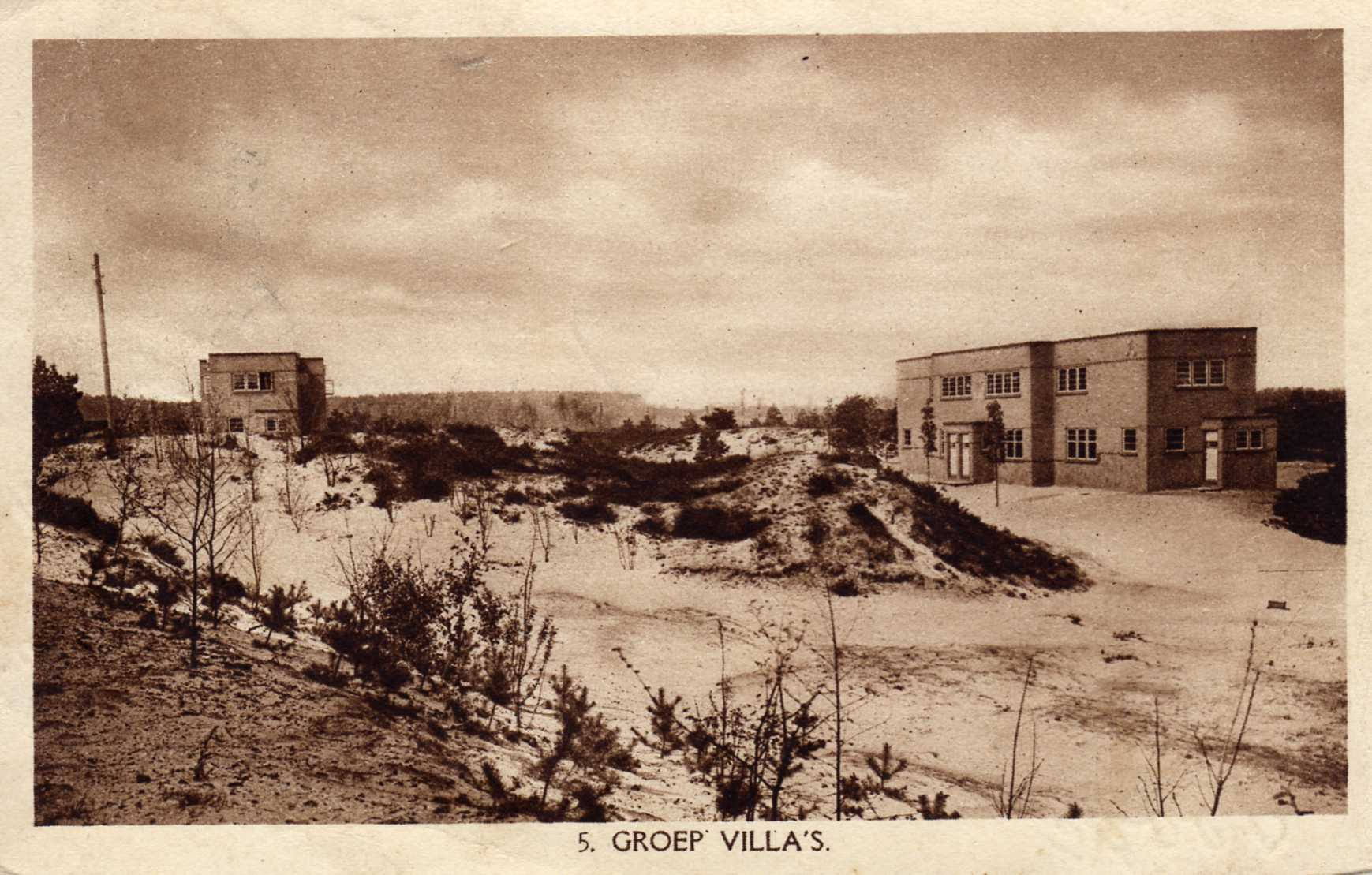
Old postcard of a holiday resort in Soestduinen
