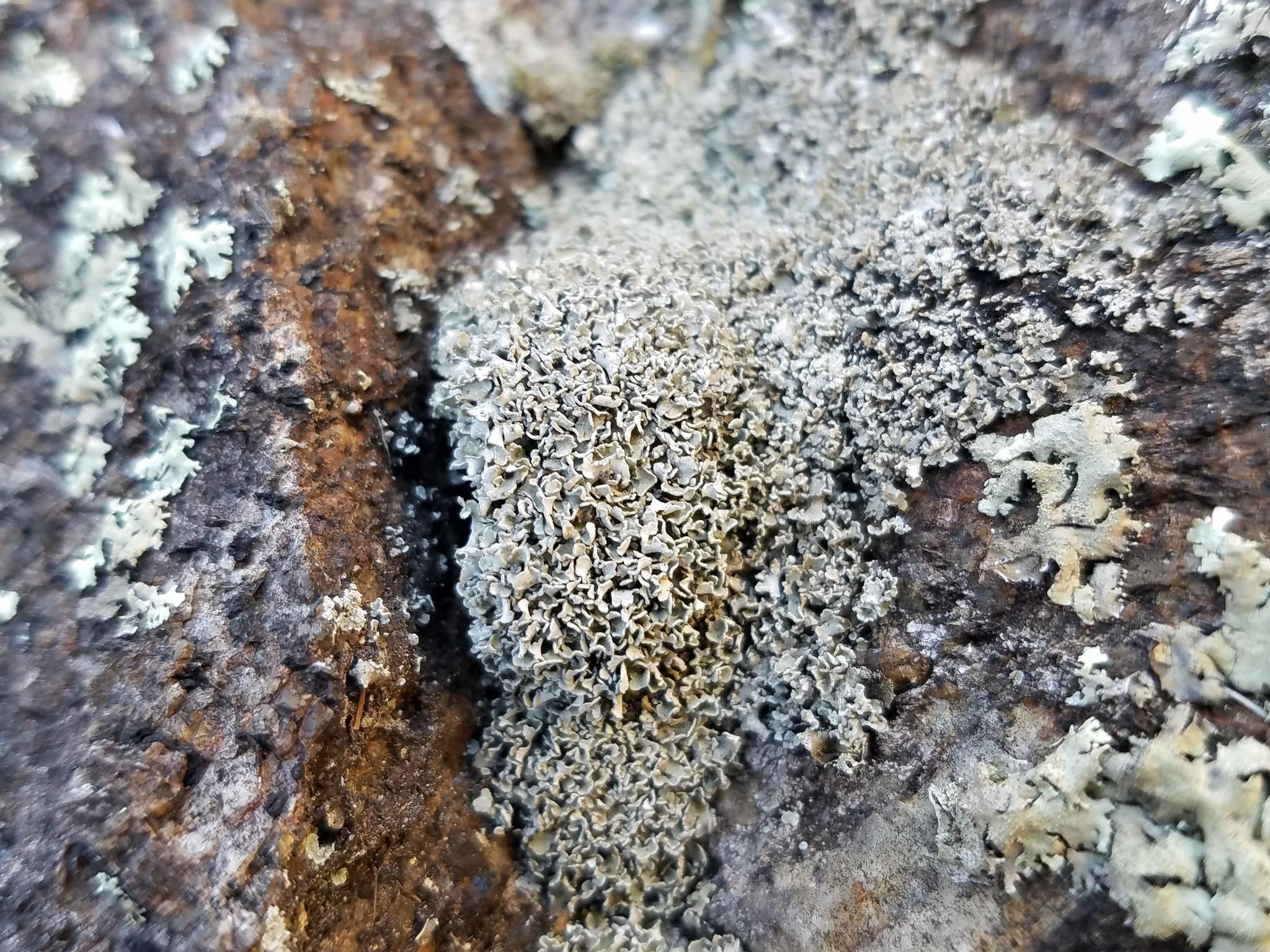

Conservation status
- Secure (NatureServe)

Scientific classification
- Kingdom: Fungi
- Division: Ascomycota
- Class: Lecanoromycetes
- Order: Lecanorales
- Family: Cladoniaceae
- Genus: Cladonia
- Species: C. strepsilis

Binomial name
- Cladonia strepsilis (Ach.) Grognot

Synonyms
- Baeomyces strepsilis Ach.

= Cladonia strepsilis =

Species of lichen

Cladonia strepsilis or the olive cup lichen is a species of cup lichen in the family Cladoniaceae. It is found in Asia, Europe and North America. In Iceland, where it is only found in a few locations in the Eastern Region, it is red listed as endangered (EN).
