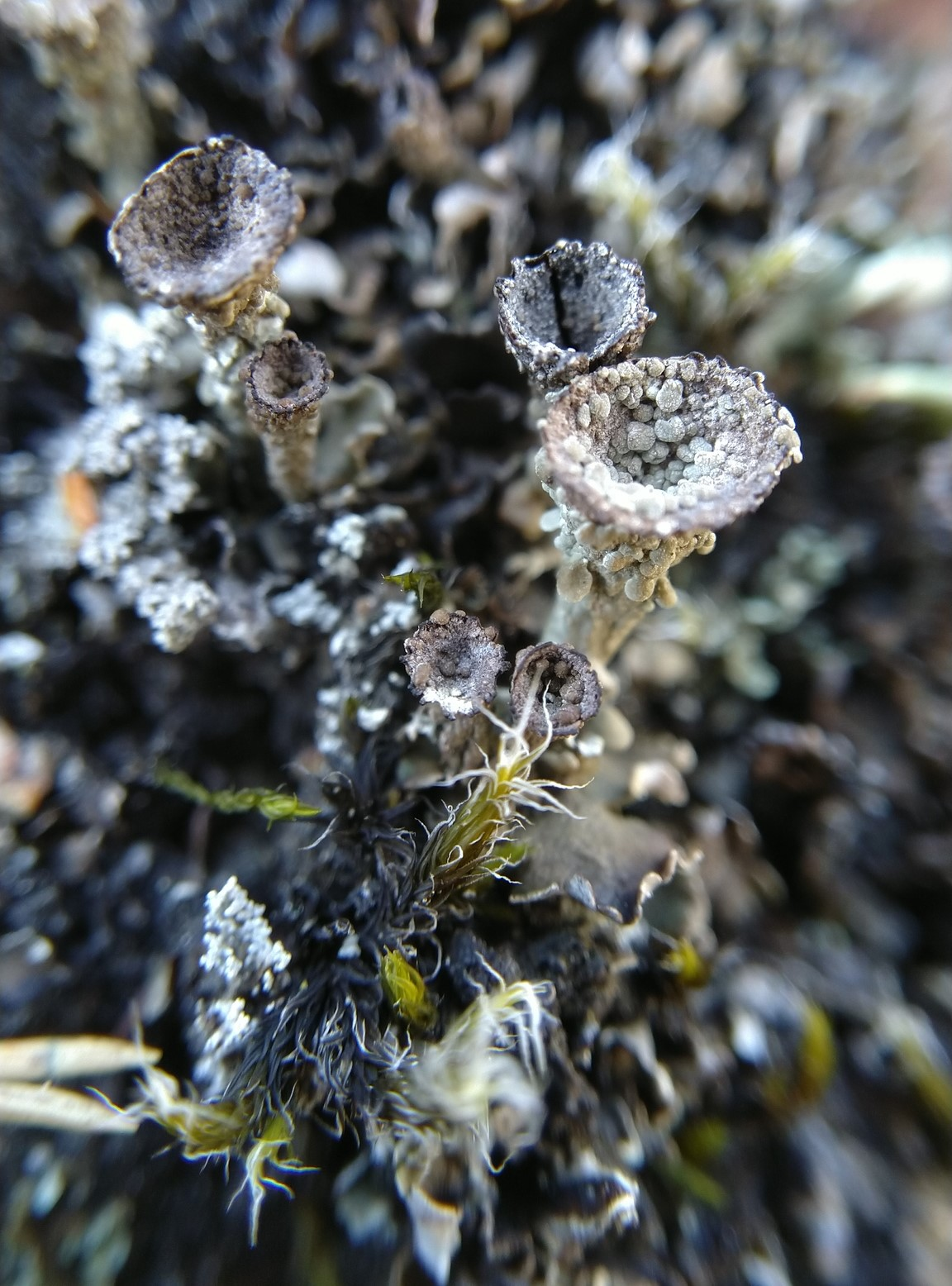

Scientific classification
- Kingdom: Fungi
- Division: Ascomycota
- Class: Lecanoromycetes
- Order: Lecanorales
- Family: Cladoniaceae
- Genus: Cladonia
- Species: C. monomorpha

Binomial name
- Cladonia monomorpha Aptroot, Sipman & van Herk (2001)

= Cladonia monomorpha =

Species of lichen

Cladonia monomorpha is a species of terricolous (ground-dwelling), fruticose lichen in the family Cladoniaceae. It is part of the Cladonia pyxidata group, known for brown apothecia on cup-shaped podetia.

== Taxonomy ==
Cladonia monomorpha was first described in 2001 by lichenologists André Aptroot, Harrie Sipman, and Kok van Herk, marking its addition to the diverse Cladonia pyxidata group. This group, which includes the Cladonia chlorophaea species complex, is characterized by brown apothecia on cup-shaped podetia and has been a focus of research due to its wide chemical and morphological variation.

The taxonomy of the Cladonia pyxidata group has been contentious, with divergent practices observed in various floras and checklists. Early treatments, such as those by Elbert Hennipman in 1969, recognized only a few members like Cladonia chlorophaea and C. fimbriata. Subsequent chemical and morphological studies, like those by Sipman in 1973, expanded the group to include several distinct species and varieties.

In more conservative views, particularly in local floras, a limited number of taxa within this group have been acknowledged. This approach was exemplified in the list of names in current use compiled by Teuvo Ahti in 1993. This list presents relevant species epithets at various taxonomic levels, reflecting the broad spectrum of taxonomic interpretations within the group.

Cladonia monomorpha itself was identified as a distinct taxon during renewed morphological studies focusing on non-sorediate species in the Cladonia pyxidata group. Initially, Dutch populations that were classified as C. pyxidata were later recognised to belong to a separate species, leading to the description of Cladonia monomorpha.

The naming of this species involved a review of historical taxonomic literature and herbarium specimens. several specimens that matched the characteristics of Cladonia monomorpha were filed under Cladonia neglecta, a name largely neglected in modern taxonomic works. Upon further examination, it was determined that the name Cladonia neglecta could not be applied to this species due to its original description and typification issues. Consequently, Cladonia monomorpha was described as a new species.

== Description ==
Cladonia monomorpha features a primary thallus composed of a mat of squamules that are never coalescent, typically measuring 3–10 mm in length and width. The squamules are relatively thick, upright, with narrow, recurved rims. Their upper surface is dark green to brown, while the lower surface ranges from white at the tips to brown or black at the base, lacking conspicuous veins.

The podetia of Cladonia monomorpha are scyphus-forming, around 1–3 cm high with scyphi measuring 4–8 mm wide. They are simple in form, gradually flaring, and covered with corticate, discoid, bullate plates on both the inside and outside. Older podetia may have squamules ending in a down-curved lobe. The apothecium discs are rare, dark brown, with a pale brown margin. They form on elongated proliferations of the scyphus margins, which can be up to 10 mm long and often branch. Pycnidia are common, spherical, and dark brown to black.

The species contains fumarprotocetraric acid, identified through thin-layer chromatography. The thallus tests negative for C, Pd, K, and KC spot tests, and does not show fluorescence when lit with a long-wavelength ultraviolet light.

=== Similar species ===
Cladonia monomorpha is similar to C. pocillum and C. pyxidata but can be distinguished by its larger, bullate plates on the cups, distinctively recurved squamule margins, and the absence of soredia or granules on the podetia. The primary squamules are erect with narrowly recurved margins and are never coalescent. The species has dark green to brown thalli when fresh, with pale whitish bare parts on the scyphi, contrasting with the brownish hues of similar species. The apothecia, though rare, differ in their development compared to related species.

== Habitat and distribution ==
Cladonia monomorpha has been found predominantly in European countries, including Belgium, Czech Republic, Denmark, Finland, France, Germany, Iceland, Luxembourg, The Netherlands, Poland, Romania, Spain, Sweden, and Switzerland. It has not been recorded from Great Britain. The species is commonly found in acidic inland sand dune areas, directly growing on sand. It is particularly abundant in areas like Kootwijkerzand and Caitwickerzand in the Netherlands, which have conservation programs for terrestrial lichen vegetation. It has also been recorded from the United States, Greenland, and Mongolia. The lichen was reported from Ardahan Province in north-east Turkey in 2011.

== See also ==
- List of Cladonia species
