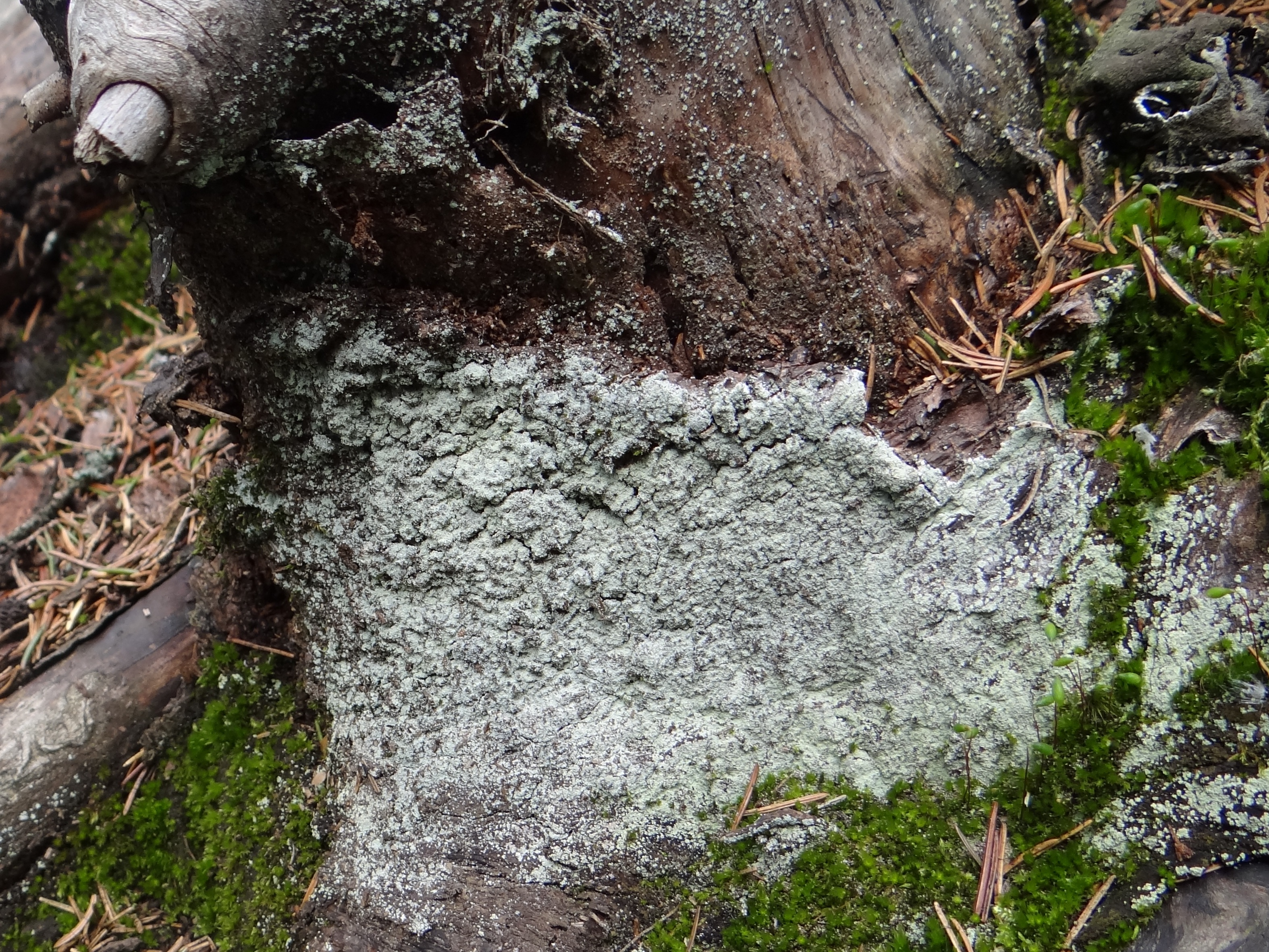
- Lepraria incana on the base of a tree trunk – a favoured habitat

Scientific classification
- Kingdom: Fungi
- Division: Ascomycota
- Class: Lecanoromycetes
- Order: Lecanorales
- Family: Stereocaulaceae
- Genus: Lepraria
- Species: L. incana

Binomial name
- Lepraria incana (L.) Ach. (1803)

Synonyms
- Byssus incana L. (1753); Lepra incana (L.) F.H.Wigg. (1780); Verrucaria incana (L.) P.Gaertn., G.Mey. & Scherb. (1801); Pulveraria incana (L.) Flörke (1807); Lecidea incana (L.) Ach. (1814); Patellaria incana (L.) Spreng. (1827); Crocynia tephra Hue (1924)

= Lepraria incana =

Species of lichen

Lepraria incana is a species of dust lichen in the family Stereocaulaceae. First described scientifically by Johann Jacob Dillenius in 1741, and then formally by Carl Linnaeus in 1753, it is the type species of the genus Lepraria. The thallus of this species is green to greyish-green, and powdery – as if made of tiny granules. These granules are soredia, which are asexual reproductive structures. Like most members of genus Lepraria, the lichen has few distinguishing features, lacking both a medulla and sexual reproductive structures (apothecia). Chemically, the lichen is characterised by the presence of the secondary chemicals known as divaricatic acid and zeorin.

The lichen prefers to grow on bark on the base of trees in moist and partly shaded locations, but will also grow on dead wood, silica-rich rocks, or soil. It is not particularly selective in terms of its bark substrate, and has been recorded growing on a wide variety of both deciduous and coniferous trees. Lepraria incana is common and widespread in Europe and Asia. Although it was previously thought to be even more widely distributed, with records from North America and South America, research has shown that at least some of the Lepraria incana lookalikes on those continents – although morphologically indistinguishable – are genetically distinct, and they have been described as unique species. Lepraria incana is relatively tolerant to air pollution and some studies have investigated its use as a biomonitor. The lichen is known to harbour several species of lichenicolous fungi as well as a mycovirus.

== Taxonomy ==
The species was one of the 80 lichens formally described by Carl Linnaeus in his 1753 work Species Plantarum. The taxon was originally named Byssus incana, as Linnaeus considered it to be a species of alga. He cited a polynomial originally published by the German botanist Johann Jacob Dillenius in his 1742 work Historia muscorum, and referred to Dillenius' illustration of the species. The polynomial (Byssus pulverulenta incana) given by Linnaeus included a diagnosis (Note: A diagnosis is "a short phrase, or polynomial, usually in Latin for Linnaean names, giving the characters by which the author believes the taxon can be distinguished".) that was unaltered from the one given by Dillenius. In some cases, because these illustrations represent the only remaining original material available, nomenclatural rules allow for these images to serve as lectotypes. The type specimen was collected in the British Isles. Linnaeus also included the species in his 1743 work Flora Svecica, an account of the plants and cryptogams growing in Sweden.

The Swedish lichenologist Erik Acharius transferred it to the genus Lepraria in 1803. It is the type species of Lepraria, having been designated so by Jack Laundon in 1992. Because there was no associated specimen in the Linnaean Herbarium, he selected Dillenius' 1741 illustration to serve as the lectotype of this taxon. Laundon had previously attempted to typify this species in 1963, but did so incorrectly. An epitype for Lepraria incana was designated by Per Magnus Jørgensen and colleagues in 1994.

Lepraria incana has been transferred to several other genera in its taxonomic history. Chronologically, these include Lepra (Friedrich Heinrich Wiggers, 1780), Verrucaria (Philipp Gottfried Gaertner, Georg Friedrich Wilhelm Meyer and Johannes Scherbius, 1801), Pulveraria (Heinrich Gustav Flörke, 1807), Lecidea (Erik Acharius, 1814), Patellaria (Kurt Polycarp Joachim Sprengel, 1827), and Crocynia (Auguste-Marie Hue, 1924). Acharius proposed the variety Lepraria incana var. latebrarum in 1810, based on the species he had originally published in 1799 as Lichen latebrarum; this lichen is now known as Dendrographa latebrarum.

== Description ==
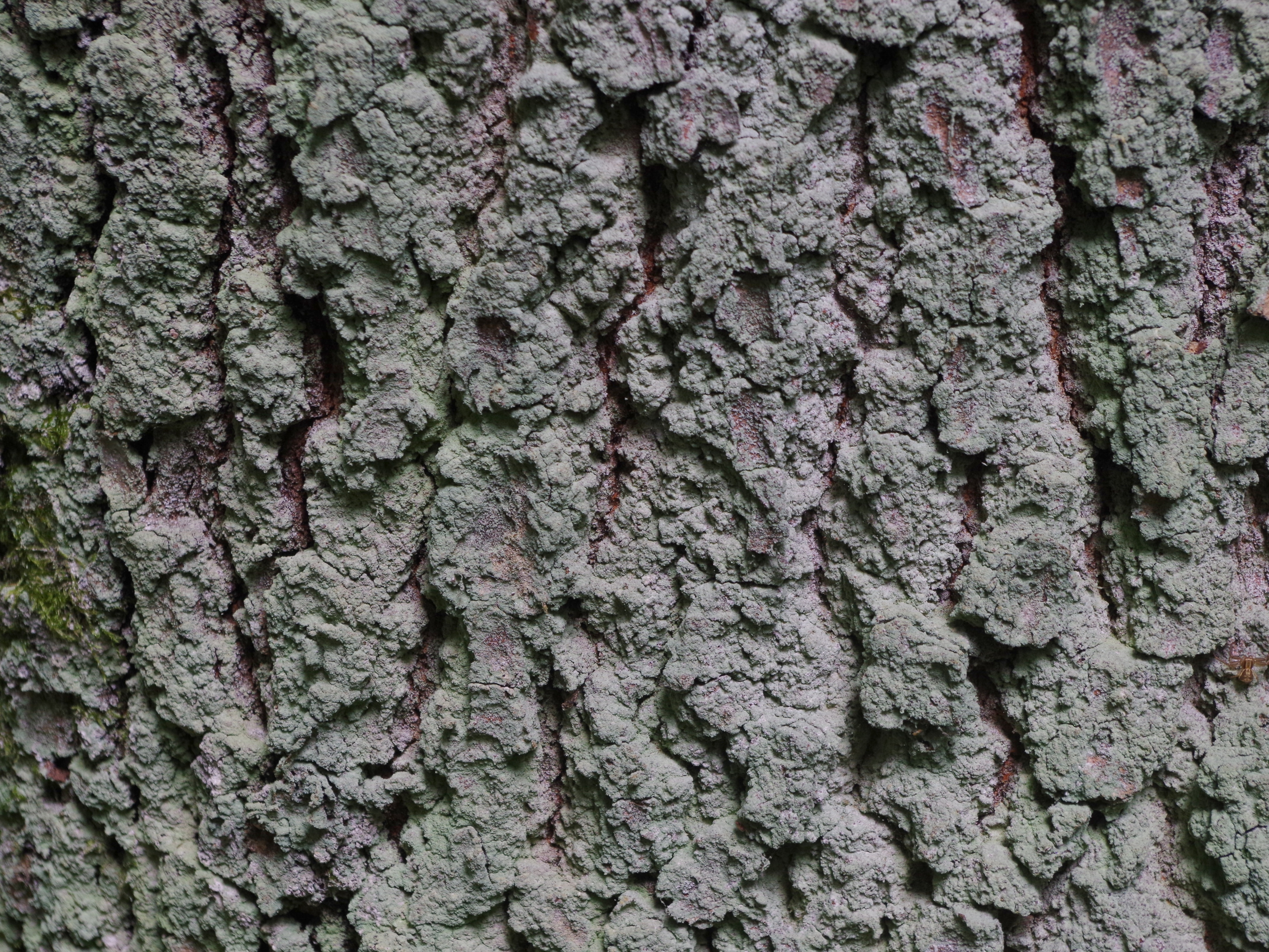
Typical of genus Leparia, the powdery thallus of L. incana does not have any sexual propagules (apothecia), and so the lichen reproduces asexually.

The thallus of Lepraria incana is leprose (powdery), and greenish grey in colour, often with blue tinge. It has a diffuse margin with neither distinct lobes, nor a distinct cortex, forming continuous patches with diameters up to about 8 cm (3.1 in), or forming smaller colonies of poorly developed patches or areoles. The thallus consists of abundant powdery soredia (little balls of algae wrapped in fungus hyphae) up to 50 μm in diameter. A medulla is sometimes present, but if so, it is usually poorly developed. Consoredia (diaspores made of aggregated soredia) are sometimes present, and they measure up to 110 μm. Overall, the appearance of the lichen can be quite variable, as sometimes it forms more or less loose cotton-like cushions, while other times it consists only of soredia that can be sparse or dense. The photobiont partner of the lichen is a spherical (coccoid) member of the green algal phylum Chlorophyta, with a diameter of up to 18 μm.

In terms of secondary chemicals, Lepraria incana contains divaricatic acid, zeorin, and nordivaricatic acid (trace amounts). Some specimens have trace amounts of atranorin, although this may be a contaminant. It also contains anthraquinones such as parietin, fallacinal, parietinic acid, and citreorosein. A chemical analysis on specimens of the lichen from Japan revealed several terpenes, including pavoninin-2, terpecurcumin Q, ergosterol acetate, taxuspine C, and lantadene A methyl ester. The thallus has a bluish tinge when viewed under ultraviolet light. The expected results of standard lichen spot tests on this species are K− or + (producing a faint yellow colour), C−, KC−, and Pd−.

== Similar species ==
There are several species of Lepraria that differ from L. incana only in their geographical ranges, or in the secondary chemicals they produce. For example, another European species, Lepraria elobata, is difficult to distinguish from L. incana; not only is it similar in appearance, but it also grows on naked bark on tree trunks. They can be distinguished by differences in chemistry: L. elobata contains stictic acid instead of divaricatic acid, and it usually does not contain atranorin. Lepraria caesiella is another lookalike that lacks divaricatic acid. Lepraria crassissima makes a thick wrinkled crust that grows on shaded, calciferous rock walls, and also has divaricatic acid. It is characterised by the presence of nordivaricatic acid, which produces a C+ red spot test. Although some authorities have placed the two taxa in synonymy, a study of the type material convinced Pieter van den Boom and colleagues that L. crassissima "is a distinct species, morphologically and ecologically different from L. incana". Divaricatic acid is also found in Lepraria juanfernandezii, a Southern Hemisphere species newly described in 2018 from the Archipelago of the Juan Fernández Islands. Unlike L. incana, the South Pacific species does not contain zeorin. The North American species L. hodkinsoniana (eastern North America) and L. pacifica (western North America) are identical to L. incana both morphologically and chemically, and can be distinguished from each other only by taking into account their distribution, or through DNA analysis.

== Habitat and distribution ==
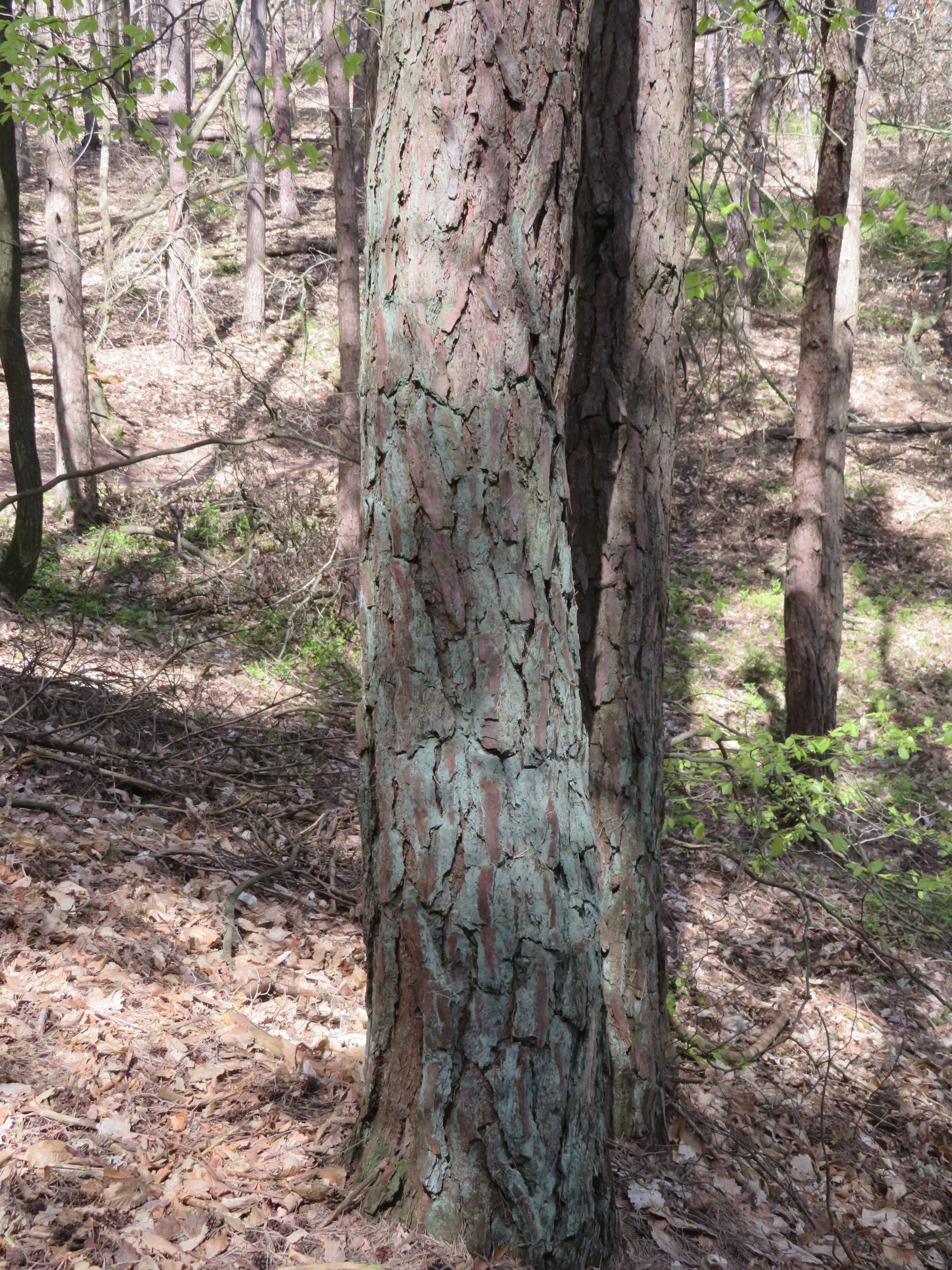
Lepraria incana covers the base and trunk of this European red pine.

Lepraria incana most commonly occurs on bark on the base of trees. It prefers old bark that is generally more than 20 years old. The lichen grows well on coniferous bark, although it prefers the bark of oak (genus Quercus). It has been judged to be well-adapted to rugose (wrinkled) bark and cork accumulation, as seen in the old stem parts of Pseudotsuga and Quercus. One study found that the probability of the lichen occurring increased with increasing bark crevice depth and decreasing tree bark pH (i.e., tending towards acidic), although another study noted its occurrence on the smooth bark of Abies. In Finland, the most common bark substrates for the lichen are from trees in the genera Picea, Tilia, and Pinus. Less frequently, it is encountered on rotten wood, soil, and rocks. In Belarus, it is the most common of nine species of Lepraria found there, accounting for nearly half of hundreds of herbarium specimens examined. There, it is most common on Picea abies and Pinus sylvestris. Similarly, it is almost always present, and sometimes dominant, in epiphytic lichen communities on common oak (Quercus rubra) in Lithuanian oak woods. In Latvia, it is most common on Quercus robur and Tilia cordata in dry deciduous forests, while in Estonia it is common in old spruce-dominated forests on account of the shade, relatively high humidity, and low pH of spruce bark. Lepraria incana generally prefers at least partly shaded areas to grow. South American specimens are usually found on tree ferns, epiphytic bryophytes, or Gaultheria twigs. In India, it grows abundantly on both rock and bark at elevations between 500 and 1,500 m (1,600 and 4,900 ft). In Norway, the lichen has been found inhabiting a number of distinct habitats: on tree trunks exposed to more or less direct rain, on sheltered, on dry bark under rock overhangs, on the underside of leaning trunks, in the concave parts of tree bases, and in bark recesses protected from direct rain. In this country it has been recorded on Alnus glutinosa, Betula pubescens and B. pendula, Juniperus communis, Malus domestica, Picea abies, Pinus sylvestris, Populus tremula, and Sorbus aucuparia.

In their 2009 world survey of Lepraria, Lauri Saag and colleagues suggested that Lepraria incana has a cosmopolitan distribution, present on all continents but not the Arctic and Antarctica. This interpretation of the lichen's distribution has been challenged by later studies. In 2010, although noted to be very rare in the Arctic, it was reported to occur on the Arctic coast of Kola Peninsula as well as the region between lower Kolyma River and Chukotka Upland. In 2011, James Lendemer used molecular phylogenetic analysis to show that the species is absent from North America, and two semi-cryptic species (Note: Semi-cryptic species are those that can be identified consistently and accurately from morphology only if their geographical origin is known.) were described: L. hodkinsoniana (eastern North America) and L. pacifica (western North America). Lepraria incana has very few records from the Southern Hemisphere, having been reported from Colombia and Bolivia. In 2013 it was reported from the Galápagos Islands, but the authors acknowledged that without DNA evidence it is impossible to know if that record and the other South American records really represent an undescribed cryptic species. The Galápagos specimen is, however, chemically and morphologically identical to both Lepraria incana and the North American L. hodkinsoniana. After a molecular analysis of specimens collected from South America, a group of lichenologists proposed to exclude (at least temporarily) L. indica from the lichen list of South America. Although Lepraria incana has been reported from New Zealand and Nepal, a later examination of those records showed that they were other species–Lepraria nigrocincta in Nepal and an uncharacterised species from New Zealand. In Asia, Lepraria incana has been recorded in Borneo, India, and Indonesia.

== Ecology ==
A novel four-segmented dsRNA virus was detected in Lepraria incana. This virus, named Lepraria chrysovirus 1 (LiCV1), is related to those found in the genus Alphachrysovirus, and is one of the first mycoviruses identified from a lichen. Polycoccum anatolicum is a lichenicolous fungus that has been found growing on Lepraria incana thalli in Turkey. At the time of its description as a new species (2013), it was the first Polycoccum known to occur on Lepraria. Psammina filamentosa, known from the Netherlands and the UK, is an algicolous and lichenicolous fungus that was described as a new species in 2020. It causes small and often somewhat granular black spots on Lepraria incana. Arthonia phaeophysciae and Rhymbocarpus pubescens are other lichenicolous fungi that grow on Lepraria incana. Athelia arachnoidea is a corticioid fungus that can act as a facultative parasite of lichens. Known to destroy the lichen vegetation of entire forests, only lichens that are able recolonize the trees within a few months – including Lepraria incana – can survive an infestation of this fungus.

== Biomonitoring ==
Because of its ability to bioaccumulate high concentrations of caesium-137, Lepraria incana has been proposed for use as a biomonitor of this airborne radionuclide in northern Iran. It is tolerant to air pollution, and can be found near and in cities. The lichen has been proposed as a "low-concurrency" species that is favoured by the disappearance of less-pollution tolerant lichens. Lepraria incana is relatively tolerant to sulphur dioxide; species that occur early in the succession of lichen communities are generally known to be less affected by this airborne pollutant. Lepraria incana has also been studied for use as an biomonitor of air pollution in Pakistan, Belgrade, and Indonesia. In Slovakia, it was one of the lichen species noted to grow in a forest contaminated with heavy metals near a historic mining area in Mlynky. Lepraria incana does not tolerate high levels of nitrogen, as was shown in a study where the lichen disappeared after 21 months of fertilisation with nitrogen-containing fertilisers.

== See also ==
- List of lichens named by Carl Linnaeus
