= Polycoccum laursenii =

Scientific classification
- Domain: Eukaryota
- Kingdom: Fungi
- Division: Ascomycota
- Class: Dothideomycetes
- Order: Trypetheliales
- Family: Polycoccaceae
- Genus: Polycoccum
- Species: P. laursenii

Binomial name
- Polycoccum laursenii Zhurb. (2004)

Species of lichen

Polycoccum laursenii is a species of lichenicolous fungus in the family Polycoccaceae. It was first described as a new species in 2004 by Russian mycologist Mikhail Petrovich Zhurbenko. It is found in Alaska and in Russia.

It is similar to Polycoccum cladoniae but differs from it in having smaller spores.

== Ecology ==
Polycoccum laursenii is a lichenicolous fungus, meaning that it infects lichens. Its only documented host species is Cladonia pocillum.
