= Lepraria hodkinsoniana =

Scientific classification
- Kingdom: Fungi
- Division: Ascomycota
- Class: Lecanoromycetes
- Order: Lecanorales
- Family: Stereocaulaceae
- Genus: Lepraria
- Species: L. hodkinsoniana

Binomial name
- Lepraria hodkinsoniana Lendemer (2011)

Species of lichen-forming fungus

Lepraria hodkinsoniana is a species of lichen in the family Stereocaulaceae. It was formally described in 2011 based on specimens from New Jersey that had long been reported under the European name Lepraria incana, a species not thought to occur in North America. It forms a thin, powdery, greenish-blue crust on tree bark. The species is found in eastern North America, where it grows mainly on maples and oaks in hardwood forests, and it is difficult to separate from L. incana by appearance and chemistry alone.

== Taxonomy ==
Lepraria hodkinsoniana was described as a new species in 2011 by James Lendemer in a revision of North American Lepraria species that produce divaricatic acid. In that study, eastern North American material that had often been identified as the European species L. incana was shown (using internal transcribed spacer DNA sequence data) to represent a separate lineage, leading to its recognition as a distinct, geographically defined cryptic species (genetically distinct, but difficult to separate by appearance and chemistry alone). In a later North American monograph, Lendemer noted that L. incana is not thought to occur in North America, and provided an expanded species account and distribution map for L. hodkinsoniana as the eastern North American look-alike.

The type specimen was collected in 2004 from Wharton State Forest (Atlantic County, New Jersey), growing on the bark of an oak (Quercus). The specific epithet honors the lichenologist Brendan P. Hodkinson, who has worked extensively on lichens of the Mid-Atlantic region of eastern North America.

Within eastern North America, it is the only known Lepraria species with an aggregate (clustered-granule) thallus that produces divaricatic acid, a combination that helps separate it from similar sterile crusts.

== Description ==
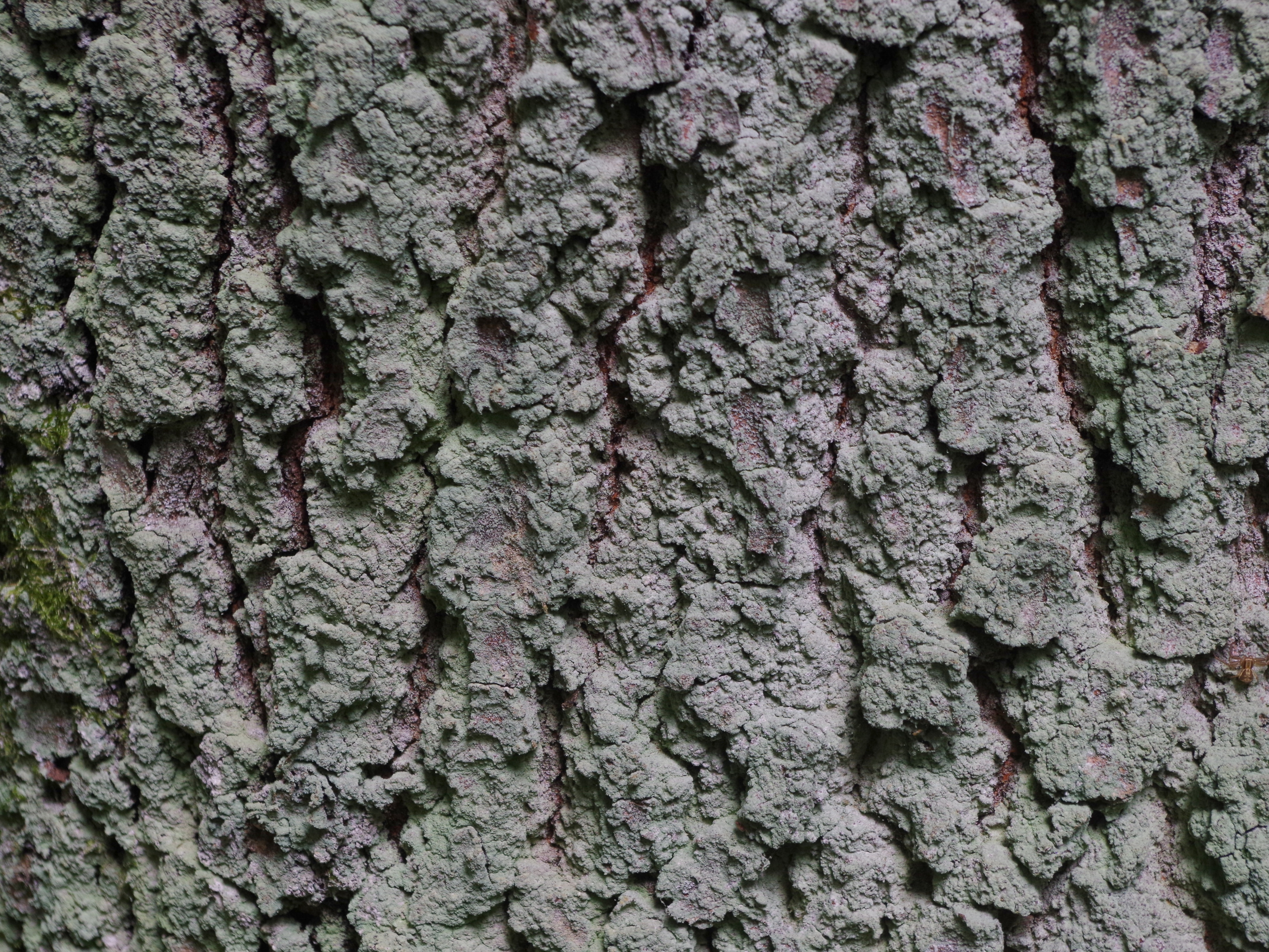
Lepraria hodkinsoniana is morphologically indistinguishable from the European species L. incana, shown here.

The thallus forms a thin, powdery (leprose) crust made of tiny granules. It develops from isolated granules that divide into small clusters and later merge into a discontinuous, greenish-blue crust, typically less than 0.1 mm thick. A prothallus (a marginal zone of fungal tissue) is usually persistent, while a distinct hypothallus and rhizohyphae are absent or poorly developed.

Microscopically, the hyphae are hyaline and are often coated by crystals that dissolve in potassium hydroxide (K). The granules are typically about 15–60 μm in diameter, and they are initially uncorticated but may develop a thin, weak pseudocortex with age; the photobiont (photosynthetic partner) is a green, coccoid alga with roughly spherical cells about 5–16 μm across.

Chemically, L. hodkinsoniana is characterized by divaricatic acid and zeorin. Atranorin is often detected but is inconsistent, and nordivaricatic acid has only rarely been reported as a trace component. Chemical spot tests are typically negative (K−, C−), with KC sometimes negative or only very weakly pink; the thallus is UV+ (blue-white).

== Habitat and distribution ==
Lepraria hodkinsoniana is restricted to eastern North America, where it grows mainly on the bark of hardwood trees, especially maples and oaks. It has also been found occasionally on conifers, and very rarely on non-calcareous rocks in habitats with high humidity.

The species is most common in the Mid-Atlantic Coastal Plain, where it is often found in mesic upland hardwood forests and can occur alongside Lepraria caesiella. Records span a broad eastern range, including the Appalachian Mountains, the Ozark region, and the Great Lakes area. It was reported for the first time from Nova Scotia in 2019. Although L. hodkinsoniana is considered infrequent overall, it is not thought to face any imminent threats.
