= Polycoccum anatolicum =

Scientific classification
- Domain: Eukaryota
- Kingdom: Fungi
- Division: Ascomycota
- Class: Dothideomycetes
- Order: Trypetheliales
- Family: Polycoccaceae
- Genus: Polycoccum
- Species: P. anatolicum

Binomial name
- Polycoccum anatolicum Halıcı & Akgül (2013)

Species of fungus

Polycoccum anatolicum is a species of lichenicolous fungus in the family Polycoccaceae. The fungus causes mild bleaching on infected parts of the surface of the host. It is the only species of Polycoccum known to infect Lepraria.

== Taxonomy ==
It was described as a new species by Mehmet Gökhan Halici and Hatice Esra Akgül in 2013. The type specimen was collected growing on the thallus of the dust lichen Lepraria incana, which itself was growing on the trunk on a Prunus species in western Turkey at an altitude of 290 m (950 ft). The specific epithet refers to the type locality in Anatolia.

== Description ==
Polycoccum anatolicum is a minute fungus that parasitises lichens without killing the host tissue outright. Its own vegetative filaments (hyphae) are colourless and extremely thin, and the only obvious sign of infection is a gradual bleaching of the colonised patches of thallus. The spore-bearing structures are tiny, flask-shaped perithecia that develop one at a time. When young they lie buried in the host, with just the pore (ostiole) peeping out; at maturity they rise slightly above the surface and measure 75–90 micrometres (μm) across. Each perithecial wall is 10–15 μm thick, built from several layers of tightly packed reddish-brown cells arranged like bricks (a textura angularis), and it darkens towards the top.

Inside, a mesh of slender, septate filaments (pseudoparaphyses) threads the cavity. The asci arise from the base of the perithecium; they are double-walled (bitunicate), narrowly cylindrical to club-shaped, and bear eight ascospores. Mature asci are typically 83–91 × 14–18 μm, with a thickened tip and a dextrinoid (reddish-brown) inner contents when stained in iodine. The spores line up in a single row, each one shaped rather like the sole of a shoe, with rounded ends and a single, barely constricted cross-wall. They are pale brown at first, then darken and become finely warty; older spores often contain several oil droplets. Typical dimensions are 26–30 × 9–11 μm. No asexual reproductive bodies (conidiomata) have been observed, and chemical spot tests show no amyloid reaction in the hymenial gel.

Polycoccum dzieduszyckii is morphologically similar, but can be distinguished from P. anatolicum by its eight-spored asci and its growth on Verrucaria.
