= Clypeococcum bisporum =

Scientific classification
- Kingdom: Fungi
- Division: Ascomycota
- Class: Dothideomycetes
- Order: Trypetheliales
- Family: Polycoccaceae
- Genus: Clypeococcum
- Species: C. bisporum

Binomial name
- Clypeococcum bisporum Zhurb. (2009)

Species of lichen

Clypeococcum bisporum is a species of lichenicolous (lichen-eating) fungus in the family Polycoccaceae. It is found in the Russian Far East, in Mongolia, and from northwest Alaska, where it grows parasitically on lichens from the genera Cetraria and Flavocetraria.

== Taxonomy ==
Clypeococcum bisporum was scientifically described as new to science in 2009 by Russian lichenologist Mikhail Zhurbenko. The type specimen was collected by the author from the Lena river delta on Stolb Island (Yakutiya, Russia); there, the fungus was found growing parasitically on the lichen Flavocetraria cucullata, which itself was growing on the ground in tundra. The species epithet bisporum refers to its two-spored asci. Zhurbenko noted that although the general morphological profile of the fungus is consistent with Clypeococcum, all of the other known species of that genus have four- or eight-spored asci.

== Description ==
Clypeococcum bisporum makes well-developed vegetative hyphae that are 2–3 μm in diameter, are olive-brown in colour, and completely penetrate the lobes of the host lichen. It typically grows on the base lobes of the host, although occasionally it is found on the central lobes. Infection results in a dark brown discolouration (often surrounded by a darker brown coloured rim around the margin) and shiny patches up to 8 mm (0.3 in) in diameter. The asci are more or less cylindrical with rounded tips, and measure 60–80 by 6–8 μm. Initially they contain eight immature spores; in maturity they consistently contain 2 spores. These ascospores are spindle-shaped (fusiform), divided by a single septum (both resultant cells are equal in size), and typically measure 20–27 by 5–5.5 μm. These spores are larger than those of other Clypeococcum species.

== Habitat and distribution ==
The two known hosts for Clypeococcum bisporum are the fruticose lichens Cetraria laevigata and Flavocetraria cucullata. The fungus has been recorded from the arctic tundra and forest-tundra areas of the Lower Lena River region of Siberia, from Renchinlkhümbe, Mongolia, and from Kotzebue, Alaska.
