= Clypeococcum =

Scientific classification
- Kingdom: Fungi
- Division: Ascomycota
- Class: Dothideomycetes
- Order: Trypetheliales
- Family: Polycoccaceae
- Genus: Clypeococcum; D.Hawksw. (1977)

Type species
- Clypeococcum cladonema (Wedd.) D.Hawksw. (1977)

Genus of fungi

Clypeococcum is a genus of lichenicolous fungi belonging to the family Polycoccaceae.

== Species ==
- Clypeococcum amylaceum Etayo (2017)
- Clypeococcum bisporum Zhurb. (2009)
- Clypeococcum cajasense Etayo (2017)
- Clypeococcum cetrariae Hafellner (1996)
- Clypeococcum cladonema (Wedd.) D.Hawksw. (1977)
- Clypeococcum epicrassum (H.Olivier) Hafellner & Nav.-Ros. (1994)
- Clypeococcum epimelanostolum (Øvstedal & D.Hawksw.) Grube & Hafellner (1990)
- Clypeococcum galloides Etayo (2010)
- Clypeococcum grossum (Körb.) D.Hawksw. (1982)
- Clypeococcum hemiamyloideum Shivarov (2019)
- Clypeococcum hypocenomycis D.Hawksw. (1980)
- Clypeococcum lenae Zhurb. (2020)
- Clypeococcum placopsiiphilum Øvstedal & D.Hawksw. (1986)
- Clypeococcum rugosisporum Etayo & Zhurb. (2017)
