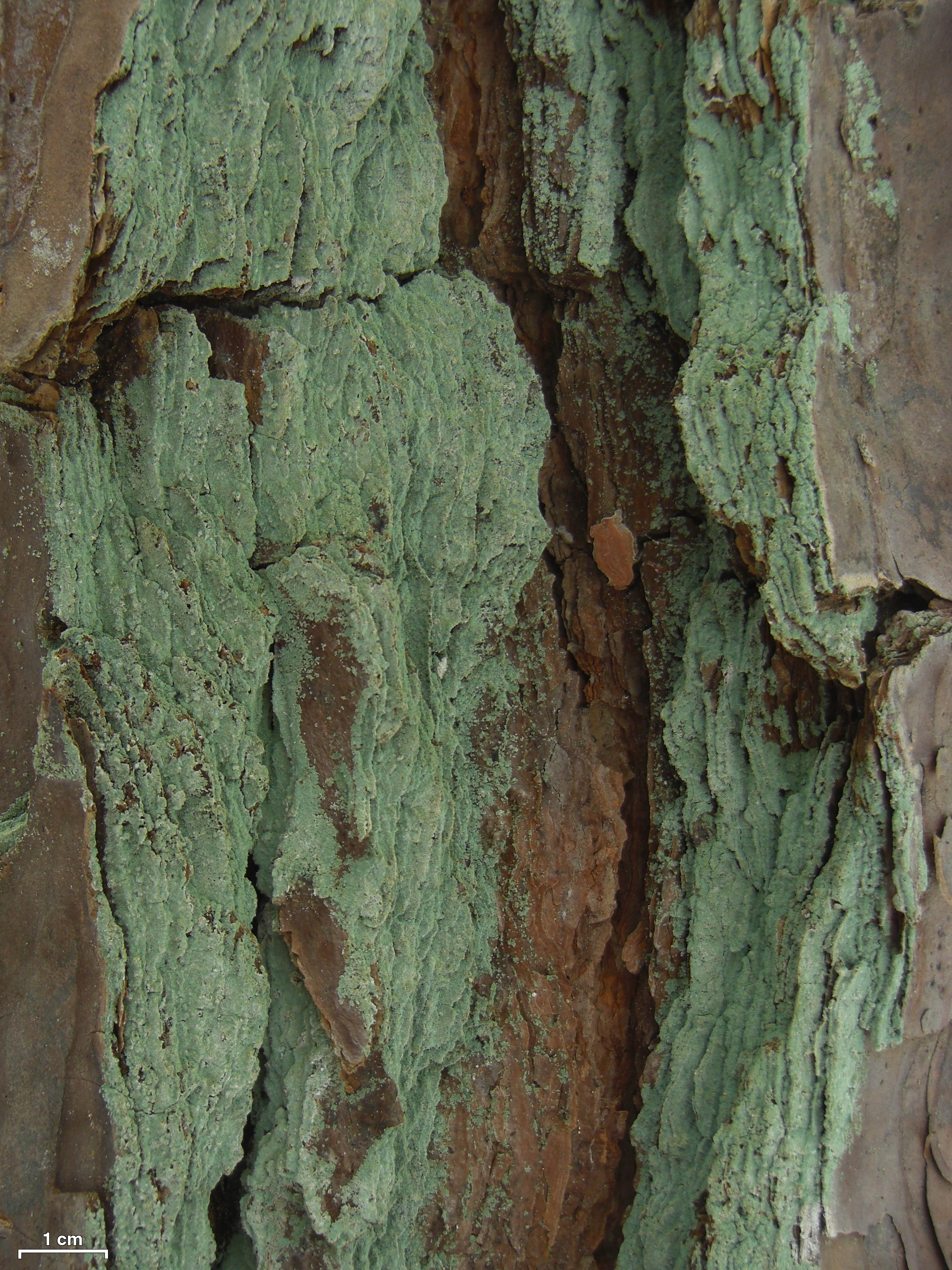
- in Delmarva Peninsula, Maryland

Scientific classification
- Kingdom: Fungi
- Division: Ascomycota
- Class: Lecanoromycetes
- Order: Lecanorales
- Family: Stereocaulaceae
- Genus: Lepraria
- Species: L. harrisiana

Binomial name
- Lepraria harrisiana Lendemer (2012)

= Lepraria harrisiana =

Species of lichen

Lepraria harrisiana is a species of leprose lichen in the family Stereocaulaceae. It is widespread in the eastern United States where it occurs in humid habitats, such as conifer swamps and riparian forests.

== Taxonomy ==
It was formally described as a new species by lichenologist James Lendemer in 2012. The type specimen was collected by Lendemer in Dismal Swamp State Park, North Carolina, where it was found growing on the bark of Chamaecyparis. The specific epithet honors lichenologist Richard C. Harris, among the first modern scientists to study the genus Lepraria.

Using molecular phylogenetics, Lendemer was able to show that there were two distinct species being called Lepraria caesiella, a species originally described by Harris. Both of the cryptic species are chemically identical (i.e., they produce the same set of secondary compounds sometimes used to distinguish lichens), but they differ ecologically, and rarely occur in the same geographic area. Two distinct morphotypes occur that correlate to the two clades recovered in phylogenetic analysis. Lepraria harrisiana refers to the population with placodioid thalli (i.e., crustose in the center and lobed at the periphery), while L. caesiella has aggregate thalli.

== Description ==
Lepraria harrisiana has a greenish-blue (accruing a yellowish hue after drying in the herbarium), crustose and leprose thallus. The granules comprising the thallus are more or less spherical, typically measuring from 27 to 48 μm in diameter. Secondary chemicals produced by Lepraria harrisiana include atranorin, zeorin, and pallidic acid. The expected results of standard spot tests are K+ (yellow), C−, KC−, P+ (weak yellow), UV−.

== Habitat and distribution ==
The lichen is widespread in the eastern United States where it occurs in humid habitats, such as conifer swamps and riparian forests. Its distribution extends from Massachusetts to Georgia, westward to at least Alabama, and the lichen also occurs in disjunct populations at high elevations of the southern Appalachian Mountains, riparian conifer forests along the edges of the Ozarks and the Ouachita Mountains, the oceanic forests of the Canadian Maritimes, and conifer swamps of the Great Lakes Region.
