= Lepraria pacifica =

Scientific classification
- Domain: Eukaryota
- Kingdom: Fungi
- Division: Ascomycota
- Class: Lecanoromycetes
- Order: Lecanorales
- Family: Stereocaulaceae
- Genus: Lepraria
- Species: L. pacifica

Binomial name
- Lepraria pacifica Lendemer (2011)

Species of lichen

Lepraria pacifica, the Pacific dust lichen, is a whitish-blue-green leprose crustose lichen that grows on its substrate like patches of granular, caked-up, mealy dust grains. Like other members of the Lepraria genus, it only reproduces asexually.

The main vegetative body (thallus) is made of patches of soredia, little balls of algae wrapped in fungus. The thallus body may be discontinuous, starting off as isolated granules that divide to form aggregations that then merge to form a 0.1– 0.7 mm crust without a cortex (ecorticate). It gradually forms an organized pseudocortex. The photobiont consists of green globose coccoid cells. It produces a thick thallus and (usually) lacks rhizohyphae and ascending thallus margins.

It is endemic to western North America. It grows on rock, soil, and bark, along the pacific coast of North America, from Coastal British Columbia to populations found in southern California, and in and near Yosemite National Park in the Sierra Nevada range. It is usually corticolous (grows on bark), and occurs only in western North America. It is usually found only growing on conifers. In redwood forests, it is the most commonly found member of its genus. It is one of the only lichens that grows on the lower trunks of redwood trees. "Pacifica" refers to it being found only along the mountain ranges of the Pacific Coast in western North America, and in the Sierra Nevada range in and near Yosemite National Park.

Lichen spot test are K− or K+ purple, C ± pink, KC+ pink, P−, UV+ blue-white.

Lepraria pacifica has a thallus similar in structure to some forms of the European L. incana, but has a thicker thallus and always produces TLC detectable nordivaricatic acid. Its thick thallus is unlike other members of its genus, but this is variable. It is the only member of its genus that regularly produces divaricatic acid. It is characterized by having divaricatic acid, zeorin, and nordivaricatic acid, which is in lower concentrations than L. crassissima and L. cryophila. It may be confused with L. crassissima and L. incana because of its similar chemistry, but it occurs in different biogeography and ecology. L. crassissima is mainly saxicolous (grows on rock), and is a European species with a thallus similar to L. cryophila, with a well developed hypothallus and rhizohyphae as well as ascending thallus margins.
