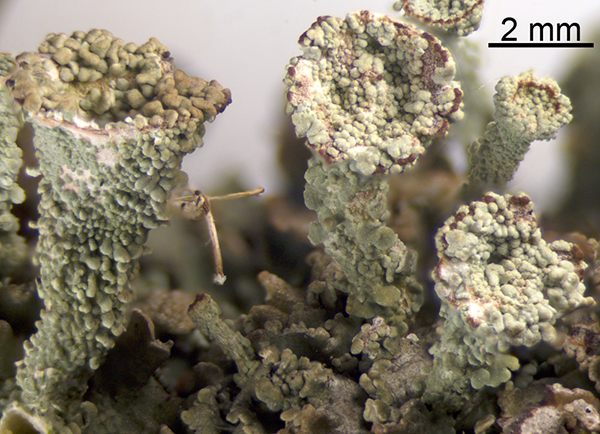

Conservation status
- Secure (NatureServe)

Scientific classification
- Kingdom: Fungi
- Division: Ascomycota
- Class: Lecanoromycetes
- Order: Lecanorales
- Family: Cladoniaceae
- Genus: Cladonia
- Species: C. pocillum

Binomial name
- Cladonia pocillum (Ach.) O.J.Rich. (1877)

Synonyms
- Baeomyces pocillum Ach.; Cladonia pocillum (Ach.) Grognot; Cladonia pyxidata subsp. pocillum (Ach.) Fink; Cladonia pyxidata subsp. pocillum (Ach.) Å.E.Dahl; Cladonia pyxidata var. pocillum (Ach.) Flot.; Cladonia pyxidata var. pocillum (Ach.) Fr.; Cladonia pyxidata var. pocillum (Ach.) Schaer.

= Cladonia pocillum =

Species of lichen-forming fungus

Cladonia pocillum is a species of lichen in the family Cladoniaceae. Swedish botanist Erik Acharius first formally described the species in 1803 as Baeomyces pocillum, but Olivier Jules Richard transferred it to the genus Cladonia in 1877.

== Habitat and distribution ==
In Nepal, Cladonia pocillum has been reported from 2,000 to 3,600 m elevation in a compilation of published records.

== Ecology ==
Cladonia pocillum is host to numerous species of lichenicolous fungi. These include:

- Arthonia epicladonia
- Bachmanniomyces uncialicola
- Cercidospora cladoniicola
- Cercidospora punctillata
- Dactylospora deminuta
- Epicladonia sandstedei
- Epicladonia simplex
- Epicladonia stenospora
- Lichenoconium pyxidatae
- Lichenocsticta alcicornaria
- Phaeosporobolus alpinus
- Phoma sp.
- Polycoccum laursenii
- Pronectria tibellae
- Protothelenella santessonii
- Rinodina egedeana
- Roselliniella cladoniae
- Sphaerellothecium araneosum var. cladoniae
- Taeniolella beschiana

== See also ==
- List of Cladonia species
