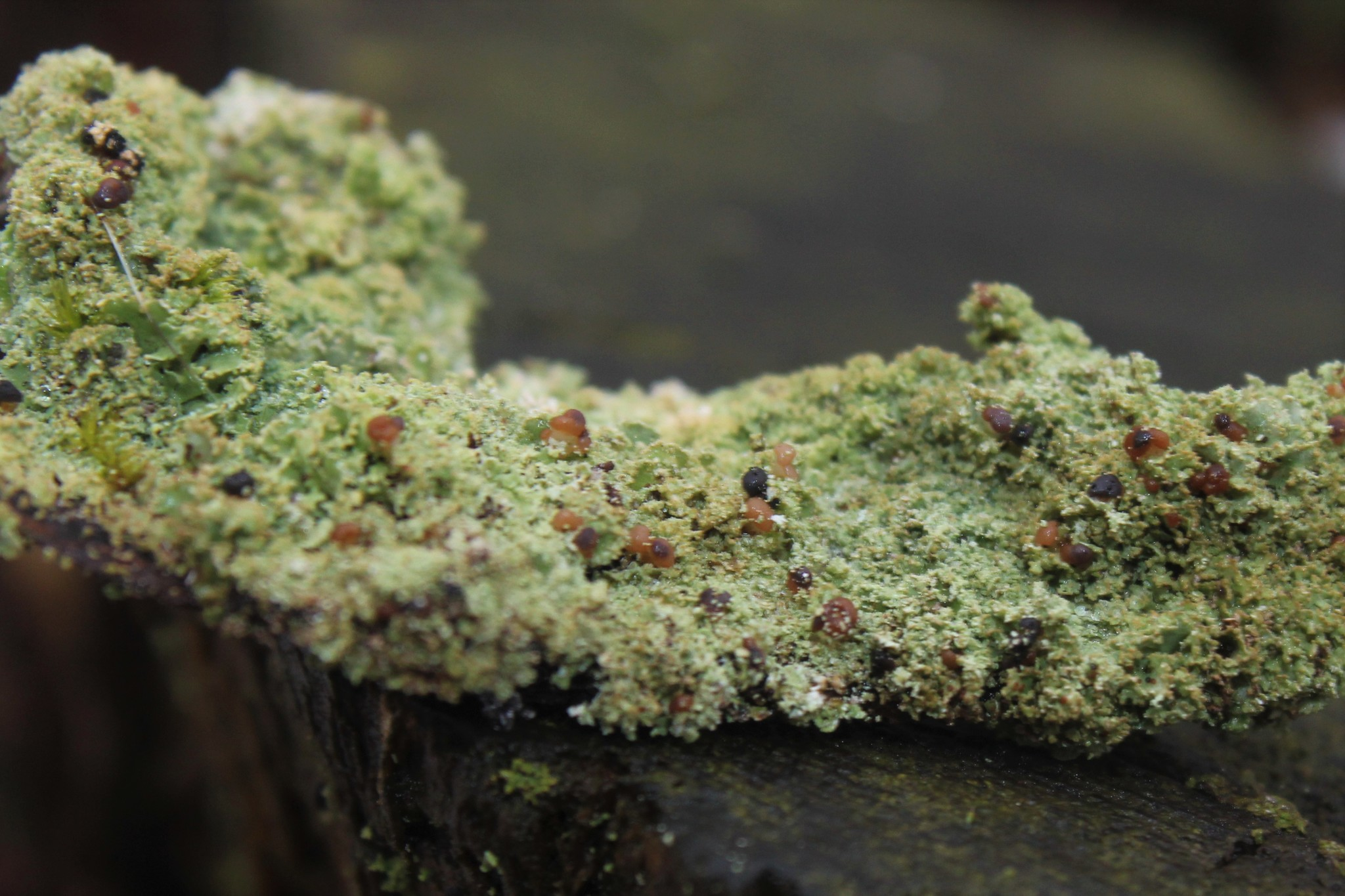

Scientific classification
- Domain: Eukaryota
- Kingdom: Fungi
- Division: Ascomycota
- Class: Dothideomycetes
- Order: Lichenoconiales
- Family: Lichenoconiaceae
- Genus: Lichenoconium
- Species: L. pyxidatae

Binomial name
- Lichenoconium pyxidatae (Oudem.) Petr. & Syd. (1927)

Synonyms
- Coniothyrium pyxidatae Oudem. (1900)

= Lichenoconium pyxidatae =

Species of fungus

Lichenoconium pyxidatae is a species of lichenicolous fungus belonging to the class Dothideomycetes. It has a Holarctic distribution being found in Alaska and various parts of Russia, including Siberia, Franz Josef Land, Novaya Zemlya and Wrangel Island.

== Host species ==
Lichenoconium pyxidatae is known to infect numerous host species. It has a preference to growing on the podium of Cladonia lichens. Known host species include:

- Cladonia chlorophaea (sensu lato)
- Cladonia coniocraea
- Cladonia deformis
- Cladonia macroceras
- Cladonia macrophylla
- Cladonia pocillum
- Cladonia pyxidata
- Cladonia rangiferina
- some unidentified Cladonia species
