= Olivier Jules Richard =

French botanist, mycologist and lichenologist

- Born: 22 March 1836; La Mothe-Saint-Héray, Deux-Sèvres, France
- Died: 7 January 1896 (aged 59)
- Education: Paris (law)
- Known for: Opposition to Simon Schwendener's theory of lichenization
- Scientific career
- Fields: Lawyer, botanist, mycologist, lichenologist
- Institutions: Marennes, La Roche-sur-Yon, Poitiers (all as prosecutor)

Olivier Jules Richard (22 March 1836 – 7 January 1896) was a French botanist, mycologist and lichenologist who published on the anatomy and symbiosis of lichens.

A native of La Mothe-Saint-Héray, he studied law in Paris. He later served as procureur de république (prosecutor) in Marennes (1873–76), La Roche-sur-Yon (1876–85) and Poitiers (1885–91). In 1890 he became a member of the Société botanique de France.

He was an outspoken opponent of Simon Schwendener's theory of lichenization.

== Publications ==
=== Articles ===
- 1883. La synthèse byro-lichénique. 7 pp. (reprinted from Le naturaliste)
- 1884. "Les céphalodies des lichens et le Schwendenerisme". Guide scientifique: Journal de l'amateur des sciences: 4 pp.
- 1887. "Encore le Schwendenerisme". Revue Mycologique 9: 98–100. (2 pp.)
- 1891. Notice sur la culture de la ramie. 7 pp. (reprinted from Bulletin de la Société d'agriculture, belles-lettres, sciences et arts de Poitiers 1891, no. 309)

=== Books ===
- 1877. Catalogue des lichens des Deux-Sèvres. L. Clouzot. 50 pp.
- 1881. De la Culture, au point de vue ornemental, des plantes indigènes de la Vendée et des départements voisins. de L. Gasté. 99 pp.
- 1883. Étude sur les substratums des Lichens. L. Clouzot, 87 pp.
- 1884. L'autonomie des lichens: ou, Réfutation du Schwendenérisme. Lechevalier. 59 pp.
- 1884. Instructions pratiques pour la formation et la conservation d'un herbier de lichens. Lechevalier. 44 pp.
- 1888. Florule des clochers et des toitures des églises de Poitiers (Vienne). Lechevalier. 50 pp.
