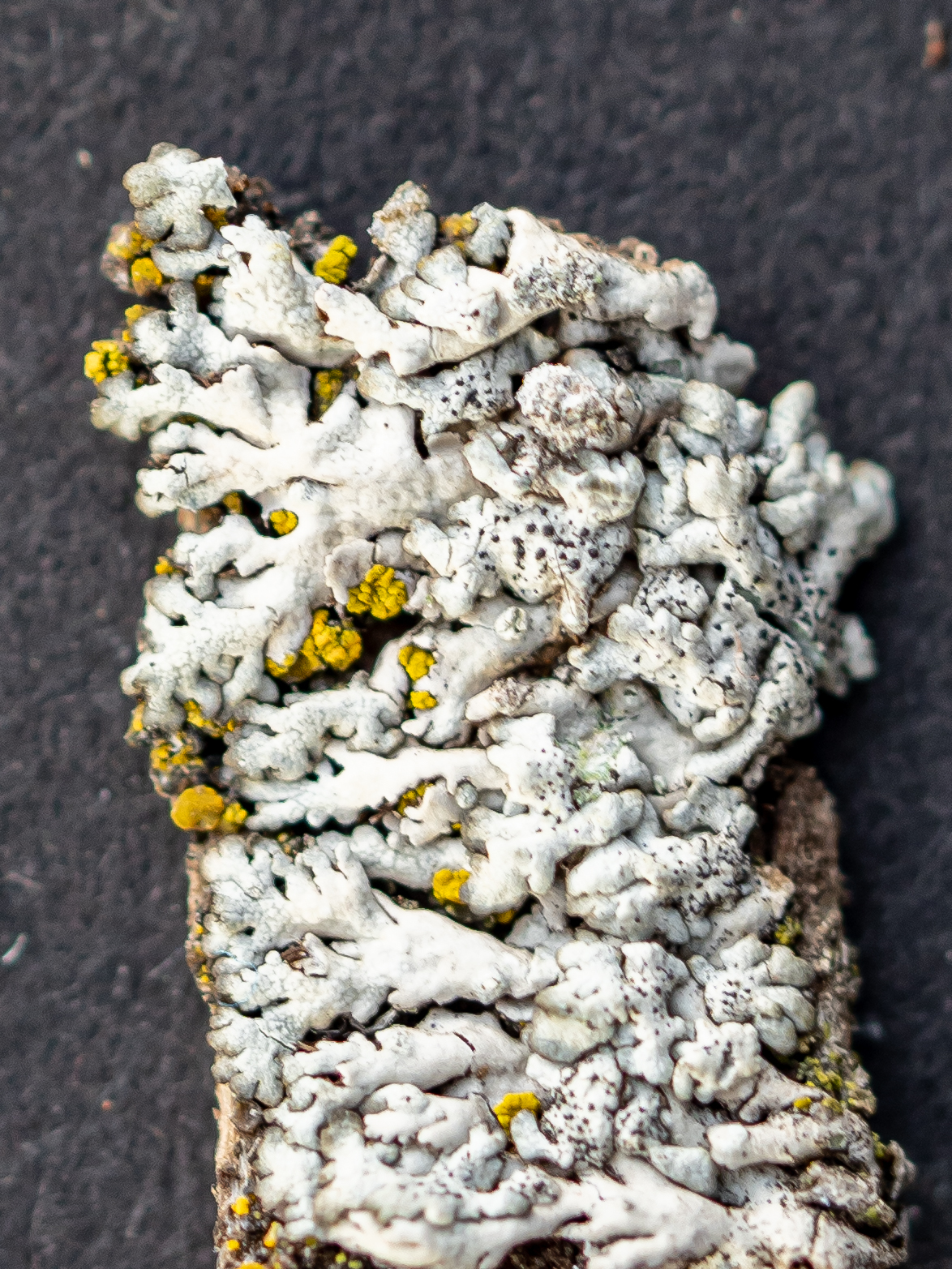
- Polycoccum pulvinatum

Scientific classification
- Kingdom: Fungi
- Division: Ascomycota
- Class: Dothideomycetes
- Order: Trypetheliales
- Family: Polycoccaceae
- Genus: Polycoccum; Saut. ex Körb. (1865)

Type species
- Polycoccum sauteri Körb. (1865)

Synonyms
- Lophothelium Stirt. (1887)

= Polycoccum =

Genus of fungi

Polycoccum is a genus of lichenicolous fungi in the family Polycoccaceae. It has about 60 species.

== Species ==
As accepted by Species Fungorum;

- Polycoccum acarosporicola Halıcı & D.Hawksw. (2007)
- Polycoccum aksoyi Halıcı & V.Atienza (2007)
- Polycoccum alboatrum (Vouaux) Etayo (2010)
- Polycoccum alpinum E. Zimm. & F. Berger (2021)
- Polycoccum amygdalariae F.Berger & Triebel (2000)
- Polycoccum anatolicum Halıcı & Akgül (2013)
- Polycoccum atrostriatae van den Boom (2012)
- Polycoccum clauderouxii S.Y.Kondr., Lőkös & Hur (2016)
- Polycoccum crassum Vězda (1970)
- Polycoccum crespoae Váczi & D.Hawksw. (2001)
- Polycoccum deformans R.Sant. & Brackel (2010)
- Polycoccum dictyonematis Etayo (2010)
- Polycoccum dzieduszyckii (Boberski) D.Hawksw. (1980)
- Polycoccum epizoharyi Calat. & V.Atienza (2000)
- Polycoccum follmannii (C.W.Dodge) Alstrup (2003)
- Polycoccum hawksworthianum Y. Joshi (2020)
- Polycoccum heterodermiae Calat. (2004)
- Polycoccum hymeniicola (Berk. & Broome) Zhurb. (2010)
- Polycoccum ibericum Etayo & van den Boom (2014)
- Polycoccum islandicum Brackel & F.Berger (2010)
- Polycoccum kerneri J.Steiner (1893)
- Polycoccum laursenii Zhurb. (2004)
- Polycoccum longisporum Etayo (2008)
- Polycoccum marmoratum (Kremp.) D.Hawksw. (1980)
- Polycoccum microcarpum Diederich & Etayo (1998)
- Polycoccum microsticticum (Leight.) Arnold (1891)
- Polycoccum minus (Kernst.) Brackel (2019)
- Polycoccum nigrosporum Etayo (2010)
- Polycoccum ochvarianum Y.Joshi (2017)
- Polycoccum opulentum (Th.Fr. & Almq.) Arnold (1891)
- Polycoccum parmotrematis Van den Boom (2020)
- Polycoccum perrugosae Brackel (2010) – host=Placopsis perrugosa
- Polycoccum psorae Zhurb. & Triebel (2010)
- Polycoccum psoromatis (A.Massal.) Hafellner (2018)
- Polycoccum pulvinatum (Eitner) R.Sant. (1993)
- Polycoccum rinodinae van den Boom (2010)
- Polycoccum rubellianae Calat. & V.Atienza (2003) – Spain; host=Caloplaca rubelliana
- Polycoccum sauteri Körb. (1865)
- Polycoccum squamarioides Mudd ex Arnold (1874)
- Polycoccum stellulatae (Vouaux) Hafellner (2015)
- Polycoccum stictaria (Linds.) D.J.Galloway (2004)
- Polycoccum teresum Halıcı & K.Knudsen (2009)
- Polycoccum trypethelioides (Th.Fr.) R.Sant. (1960)
- Polycoccum ventosicola Zhurb. (2007)
- Polycoccum vermicularium (Linds.) D.Hawksw. (1985)

Former species;

- P. arnoldii (Hepp) D. Hawksw. (1979) = Sphaerellothecium arnoldii, Mycosphaerellaceae
- P. bryonthae (Arnold) Vězda (1969) = Didymocyrtis bryonthae, Phaeosphaeriaceae
- P. bryonthae var. stellulatae (Vouaux) Cl. Roux (2014) = Polycoccum stellulatae
- P. dannenbergii sensu auct. brit. p.p. = Roselliniella atlantica, Sordariales order
- P. dannenbergii sensu auct. brit. = Peridiothelia fuliguncta, Pleomassariaceae
- P. dannenbergii (Stein ex Eitner) Vězda (1969) = Peridiothelia fuliguncta, Pleomassariaceae
- P. epicrassum (H. Olivier) R. Sant. (1960) = Clypeococcum epicrassum, Polycoccaceae
- P. fumosarium (Leight.) Arnold (1881) = Endococcus rugulosus, Dothideomycetes
- P. galligenum Vězda (1969) = Polycoccum pulvinatum
- P. gelidarium (Mudd) D. Hawksw. (1983) = Roselliniopsis gelidaria, Sordariales
- P. hymeniicola (Berk. & Broome) Zhurb. (2010) = Verrucoccum hymeniicola, Dictyosporiaceae
- P. infestans (Speg.) Etayo (1996) = Didymocyrtis infestans, Phaeosphaeriaceae
- P. kaernefeltii S.Y. Kondr. (2008) = Didymocyrtis kaernefeltii, Phaeosphaeriaceae
- P. peltigerae (Fuckel) Vězda (1969) = Didymocyrtis peltigerae, Phaeosphaeriaceae
- P. sauteri var. margarodes Norman (1874) = Polycoccum sauteri
- P. slaptonense D. Hawksw. (1994) = Didymocyrtis slaptonensis, Phaeosphaeriaceae
- P. sporastatiae (Anzi) Arnold (1874) = Muellerella pygmaea, Verrucariaceae
- P. triphractoides (Nyl. ex Cromb.) Arnold (1877) = Phaeospora triphractoides, Dothideomycetes
- P. umbilicariae (Linds.) D. Hawksw. (1985) = Endococcus umbilicariae, Dothideomycetes
