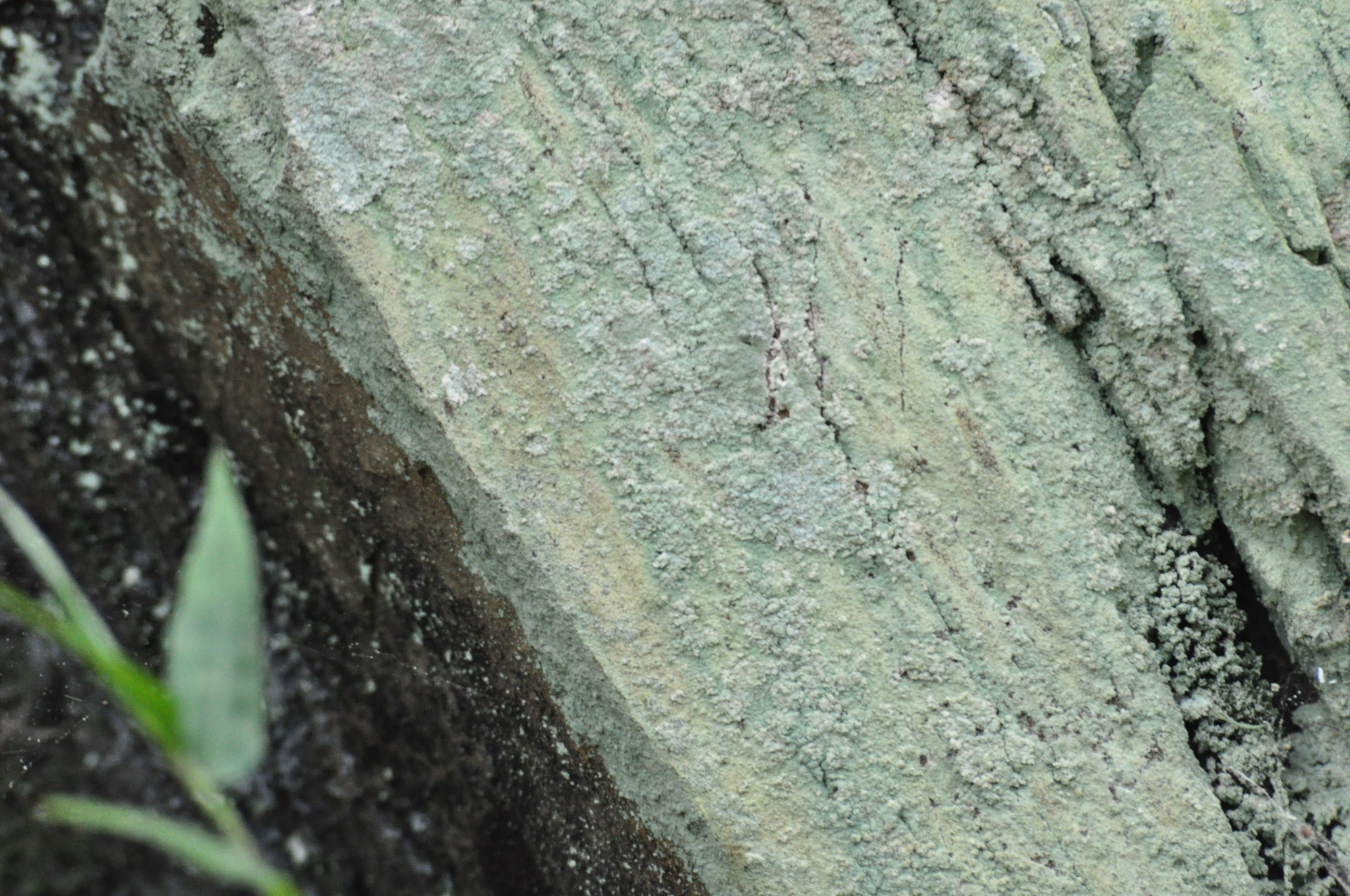

Scientific classification
- Kingdom: Fungi
- Division: Ascomycota
- Class: Lecanoromycetes
- Order: Lecanorales
- Family: Stereocaulaceae
- Genus: Lepraria
- Species: L. caesiella

Binomial name
- Lepraria caesiella R.C.Harris (2005)

= Lepraria caesiella =

Species of lichen

Lepraria caesiella is a species of leprose lichen in the family Stereocaulaceae. It forms a thin, gray-blue powdery crust composed of granular aggregations and lacks a true cortex or lobes. The species is widespread throughout northeastern North America, occurring primarily on tree bark, especially hardwoods like oaks, though it can also be found on non-calcareous rocks in sheltered locations. It was formally described by Richard C. Harris in 2005 and is characterized by its production of atranorin, zeorin, and pallidic acid. phylogenetics studies have helped distinguish it from the morphologically similar L. harrisiana, which was previously considered part of the same species.

== Taxonomy ==
The species was described by Richard C. Harris in 2005, and was previously known as "Lepraria sp. 3" in North America. The type specimen was collected in Monroe County, Pennsylvania, where it was found growing on birch, and is housed in the New York Botanical Garden herbarium (NY). Molecular phylogenetics analysis has confirmed that L. caesiella represents a distinct evolutionary lineage from morphologically similar species. Initially, some populations with placodioid thalli were included within L. caesiella due to their identical chemistry, but DNA sequence data later showed these to represent a separate species, which was described as L. harrisiana.

== Description ==
This lichen forms a powdery crust with edges that are either diffuse or poorly defined. It lacks lobes and has no medulla or base layer (hypothallus). The thallus is crustose, leprose, and aggregated, appearing discontinuous and not stratified. It initially forms isolated granules that divide to form aggregations, eventually merging to form a thin crust (less than 0.1 mm thick), gray-blue in color.

The reproductive structures consist of well-organized and discrete spherical (globose) granules, typically 35–59 μm in diameter (range 24–76 μm). These granules are ecorticate and remain distinct rather than forming compound units. The photobiont is green and coccoid, with globose cells typically 8–12 μm in width (range 6–16 μm). The hyphae are hyaline, typically 2–4 μm in width (range 1.8–5 μm), and are septate and obscured by a thick layer of crystals that appear bright under polarized light (POL+), which dissolve in KOH solution and recrystallize as thin bent needles.

The main chemical constituents are atranorin, zeorin, and pallidic acid. Some specimens have been found to also contain roccellic/angardianic acid or an unidentified fatty acid. The expected results of chemical spot tests are K+ (yellow), C−, KC−, and P+ (weak yellow), and UV−.

== Habitat and distribution ==
Lepraria caesiella is common and widely distributed throughout temperate and boreal northeastern North America, extending southward in the Appalachian Mountains. The species occurs on a wide diversity of bark-bearing (corticolous) substrates, including both conifers and hardwoods, though the majority of corticolous collections are from hardwoods, particularly oaks (Quercus). Disjunct saxicolous populations also occur in the Ozark ecoregion.

While primarily a corticolous species, it can also be found on noncalcareous rocks. These saxicolous populations are ecologically distinct from other sympatric Lepraria species because they occur on dry, protected rock faces that are sheltered from rain but still exposed to some light. This differs from most other species which occur either on rock faces fully exposed to the elements, or in shaded overhangs that are completely protected and always shaded.
