= Richard Clinton Harris =

American lichenologist (1939–2021)

- Born: Richard Clinton Harris; December 6, 1939
- Died: May 10, 2021 (aged 81); Carmel, New York, U.S.
- Education: Oberlin College; Michigan State University
- Known for: Systematics of pyrenocarpous lichens; lichen floras of eastern North America; regional identification manuals for Florida and Puerto Rico
- Spouse: William R. Buck (m. 2013)
- Scientific career
- Fields: Lichenology; mycology
- Workplaces: The New York Botanical Garden
- Thesis: "A Taxonomic Revision of the Genus Arthopyrenia Massal. s. lat. (Ascomycetes) in North America' (1975)
- Doctoral advisors: Henry Andrew Imshaug
- Author abbrev. (botany): R.C.Harris

Richard Clinton "Dick" Harris (December 6, 1939 – May 10, 2021) was an American lichenologist associated for most of his career with the New York Botanical Garden. He was especially known for his work on pyrenocarpous lichens and lichenicolous fungi and for his wide field knowledge of the lichen flora of eastern North America. Over more than five decades he described over 200 new species and infraspecific taxa, 14 genera, and three families of lichen-forming and lichenicolous fungi, and became an influential figure in North American organismal lichenology.

== Early life and education ==
Harris grew up in Michigan, where he began studying lichens in the field and developed a detailed knowledge of the state's flora while still a student. As an undergraduate at Oberlin College he became interested in the biology of lichen symbioses, an interest that led him into graduate study in lichenology under the bryologist and lichenologist Henry Imshaug.

Throughout Harris's training he focused on floristics and systematics of lichens. His early work on the lichens of the Straits of Mackinac region in Michigan, including a self-published manual and keys, established his reputation among North American lichenologists for clear, usable treatments that covered both macrolichens and inconspicuous crustose species.

== Career and research ==
Harris spent virtually his entire professional career at the Cryptogamic Herbarium of the New York Botanical Garden (NYBG) in the Bronx. There he worked on the curation and reorganization of the lichen collections, applying his own taxonomic framework and routinely subjecting specimens to thin-layer chromatography to investigate their chemistry. Colleagues and students recall him as a meticulous worker who spent long days at the microscope and in the herbarium, gradually resolving numerous taxonomic problems in eastern North American lichens. Together with James C. Lendemer he later co-authored an overview of the New York Botanical Garden lichen herbarium, outlining the history of the collection, Harris's long-term role in reorganizing and expanding it, and its importance as a modern resource for fungal biodiversity research and training.

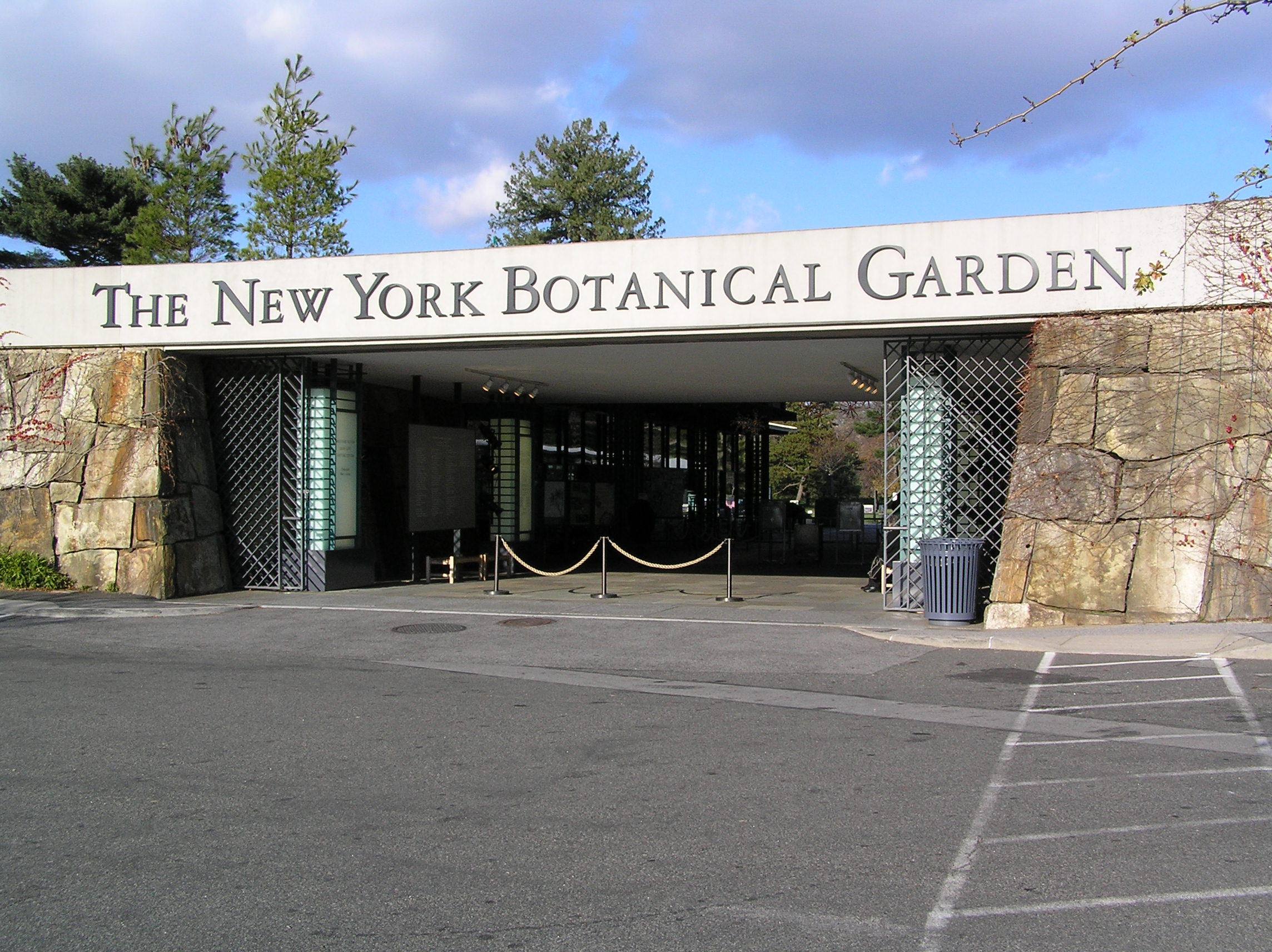
NYBG entrance

Fieldwork was central to his approach. Harris began with floristic projects in his home state of Michigan and later carried out extensive collecting in Florida from the panhandle to the Everglades, in the Ozark region of Missouri, Arkansas, Oklahoma and Kansas, and across northeastern North America. He participated regularly in Andrews Forays, Crum Bryophyte Workshops and other field meetings, and helped organize the Tuckerman Lichen Workshops, which combined intensive field collecting with evening identification sessions. He also collected in eastern Canada, including several mycological "bioblitz" events in New Brunswick and fieldwork in Quebec. Harris continued active field collecting into his eighties; his last known collection, number 62893, was made in November 2020 at California Hill State Forest in Putnam County, New York, where he gathered the rare species Peltigera hydrothyria.

Taxonomically, Harris was one of the most productive describers of new lichen taxa in North America. A tally based on later checklists and databases shows that he published 212 new species and infraspecific taxa; around 90% of these were still regarded as valid a decade into the 21st century, although a number had been transferred to other genera. He also described 14 new genera, only a small minority of which were later synonymized, and three new families that continued to be accepted. Much of this work focused on pyrenocarpous lichens, particularly the families Pyrenulaceae and Trypetheliaceae, where his publications of the 1980s helped to sharpen generic boundaries and character sets for tropical and subtropical species.

Later in his career Harris devoted increasing attention to lichenicolous fungi, despite long claiming to have no special interest in them. He routinely examined every lichen collection that crossed his desk for parasitic or commensal fungi and assembled a large series of such specimens from North America, many of which were sent to specialist collaborators for formal description. Numerous lichenicolous species were eventually described from his material, some of them bearing his name, such as Lepraria harrisiana, Buellia harrisiana, Capronia harrisiana and Sticta harrisii. Although he rarely accepted coauthorship when he had only collected the material, he did agree to be listed among the authors of a few species, including the lichenicolous fungi Abrothallus pezizicola and Tremella imshaugiae.

Harris also produced a series of practical identification manuals and keys that circulated widely among field lichenologists. His mimeographed Some Florida Lichens and its follow-up More Florida Lichens provided keys not only to macrolichens but also to many crustose and pyrenocarpous taxa, including an overview of tropical groups then poorly treated elsewhere. For a lichen course and forays in Puerto Rico he prepared Working Keys to the Lichen-Forming Fungi of Puerto Rico (1989), an extensive key that for many years served as the only comprehensive resource for that flora. These and other self-published works were valued for their direct style, dense taxonomic content and emphasis on characters observable with modest equipment.

== Teaching and mentorship ==
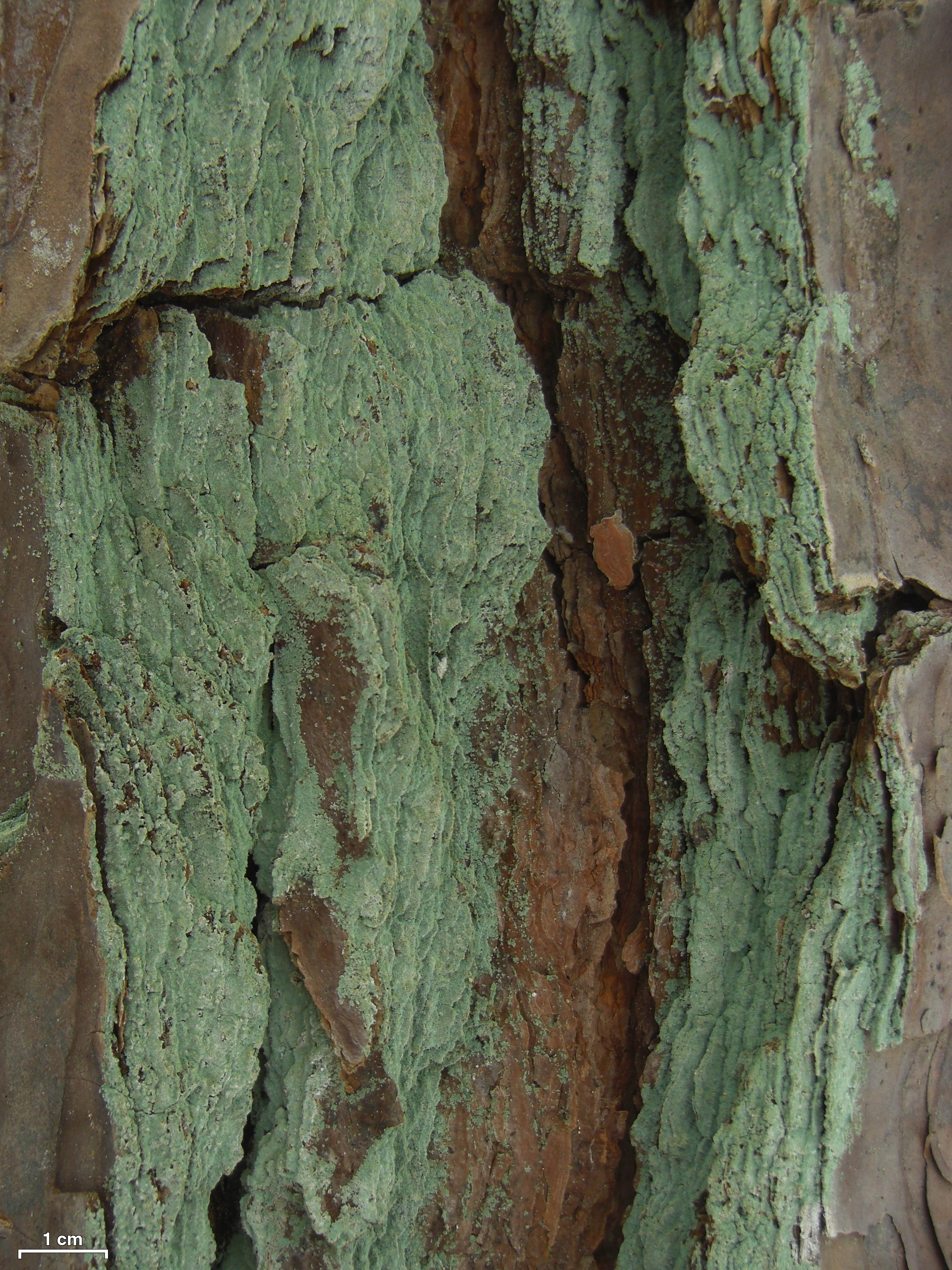
The leprose lichen species Lepraria harrisiana is one of several named in honor of Harris.

Although Harris never held a conventional academic post, he taught and mentored a substantial number of students and amateurs through his work at NYBG and at field workshops. His first formal graduate student, Lois Brako, completed a PhD on Neotropical lichens while working in the cryptogamic collections at NYBG, relying heavily on Harris's expertise in taxonomy and ecology. Later, he served as an informal advisor for Anja Amtoft's master's research on the genus Dermatocarpon in the Ozarks, spending many hours explaining lichen taxonomy and drawing diagrams for her in his office.

Harris also mentored a younger generation of lichenologists through correspondence. Before comprehensive modern monographs and internet resources were available, he encouraged collectors across North America to send problem specimens to him at NYBG. He would identify the material and return it with determinations and comments, in what some described as a "correspondence school" in lichenology. One of the most prominent lichenologists to emerge from this informal network was James C. Lendemer, who first contacted Harris while documenting lichens in New Jersey and later became his graduate student at NYBG. Working closely with Harris, Lendemer completed a major revision of the genus Lepraria and later joined the Garden's curatorial staff.

Through the Tuckerman Lichen Workshop, founded in the mid-1990s by Harris and William R. Buck, he encouraged capable amateurs as well as professionals to engage seriously with lichen taxonomy. The workshops, modeled in part on meetings of the British Lichen Society, combined fieldwork with evening microscope sessions and helped develop a community of skilled field lichenologists in eastern North America. Participants later credited Harris's demanding standards, careful apothecial sectioning, and insistence on ecological and chemical evidence with shaping their approach to lichen study.

== Personal life ==
Harris lived for more than four decades with the bryologist William R. "Bill" Buck, whom he met in the 1970s. The two moved in together in November 1974 and treated that date as their anniversary; they later described themselves as having been partners for over 46 years. When same-sex marriage was legalized throughout the United States, they decided to marry primarily for practical reasons and did so on November 14, 2013, at their local town hall in the town of Kent, New York, with a small group of colleagues as witnesses.

In 1998 Harris and Buck left the Bronx and bought a house with an acre of land in Kent. The property included a greenhouse built over a former swimming pool, which they converted fully for horticultural use. Gardening became a major focus of Harris's life outside lichenology. He transformed much of the yard into vegetable plots and perennial beds, planted numerous fruit and ornamental trees and maintained detailed records of seed purchases, germination, performance and culinary quality of the produce. The greenhouse, kept just warm enough to prevent frost, housed fig, blood orange, loquat and apricot trees, and supplied winter salads of lettuce and pea shoots.

Harris and Buck relied heavily on the garden for food, preserving fruit as jams and jellies and canning large quantities of tomato sauce at the end of the growing season. Buck, a long-standing vegetarian, did most of the cooking; Harris generally followed the same diet but occasionally ate meat when dining out. According to Buck's account, Harris was working in the garden on the morning of May 10, 2021, when he died at home in Carmel, New York, at the age of 81.

== Legacy ==
Contemporaries regarded Harris as one of the leading lichenologists of his generation. Irwin M. Brodo characterized him as perhaps North America's most accomplished lichenologist, citing his command of pyrenocarpous groups and his insistence on rigorous standards in taxonomic work, and later, in a 2021 obituary in the International Lichenological Newsletter, described him as one of the continent's foremost lichen taxonomists whose fieldwork ranged from subantarctic islands to the Caribbean and who knew the lichens of eastern North America better than any of his contemporaries. Teuvo Ahti and others emphasized his deep knowledge of the lichens of eastern North America and his willingness to tackle difficult groups, often subjecting nearly every specimen in the NYBG herbarium to thin-layer chromatography in order to resolve chemical variation. His herbarium collections, numbering many tens of thousands of specimens, are considered a major baseline for the study of lichen diversity and distribution in temperate eastern North America.

Through his manuals, pyrenolichen papers and unpublished camera lucida drawings of type material, Harris provided a framework for later workers on tropical and subtropical lichen floras. His field-based teaching and the Tuckerman Workshops helped build a network of professional and amateur lichenologists across the continent. Several contributors to memorial accounts have credited his demanding but generous mentorship with shaping their careers and with encouraging a culture of detailed, specimen-based taxonomy in North America. Harris's standing in the field was marked in 2009 by a Festschrift issue of the lichenological journal Opuscula Philolichenum, which included a detailed biographical sketch, lists of his publications and field expeditions, and a catalog of taxa he described or that were named in his honor.

== Selected publications ==
- Harris, Richard C. (1973). "The corticolous pyrenolichens of the Great Lakes region". The Michigan Botanist. 12 (1): 3–68.
- Harris, Richard C. (1984). "The family Trypetheliaceae (Loculoascomycetes: lichenized Melanommatales) in Amazonian Brazil". Acta Amazonica. 14 (suppl 1–2): 55–80. doi:10.1590/1809-43921984145080.
- Harris, Richard C. (1989). "A sketch of the family Pyrenulaceae (Melanommatales) in eastern North America" (PDF). Memoirs of the New York Botanical Garden. 49: 74–107.
- Harris, Richard C. (1989). Working Keys to the Lichen-forming Fungi of Puerto Rico. Maricao, Puerto Rico: Catholic University of Puerto Rico. pp. 1–107.
- Harris, Richard C. (1990). Some Florida Lichens. Bronx, New York: The New York Botanical Garden. pp. 1–109.
- Harris, Richard C. (1995). More Florida Lichens: Including the 10¢ Tour of the Pyrenolichens. Bronx, New York: The New York Botanical Garden. pp. 1–192.

== See also ==
- Category:Taxa named by Richard Clinton Harris
