= Obryzaceae =

Scientific classification
- Kingdom: Fungi
- Division: Ascomycota
- Class: Sordariomycetes
- Informal group: Sordariomycetes incertae sedis
- Family: Obryzaceae; Gustav Wilhelm Körber (1855)

Type genus
- Obryzum Wallr. (1825),

Family of fungi

Obryzum is a fungal genus in the monotypic family Obryzaceae, in the class Sordariomycetes. The relationship of this taxon to other taxa within the class is unknown (incertae sedis).

The genus name of Obryzum is derived from the Ancient Greek word ὄβρυζον meaning pure gold.

Reported as a parasitic on cyanobacterial lichens from the genus Leptogium.

== Description ==
The genus is mainly lichenicolous but with green algae on rocks or tree bark and seldom on mosses. Sexual morph: Ascomata perithecial, pyriform (pear-like), astromatic, immersed. Ostiole periphysate. Peridium hyaline with ostiolar region appearing light brown at times. Asci 4-8-spored, unitunicate, clavate, closely ellipsoid to ovoid, short-pedicellate, with barely visible apical ring, deliquescent at the base. Ascospores overlapping 1–2-seriate, hyaline, aseptate, smooth-walled, fusiform to limoniform or ellipsoid, lacking any mucilaginous sheath or appendage. Asexual morph is undetermined (adapted from Cannon & Kirk 2007, Maharachchikumbura et al. 2016).

== Distribution ==
It is mostly found in the north temperate zones, and scattered worldwide. With most sightings in North America and Europe, with a few in Australia. Such as Obryzum corniculatum is found in several places in Great Britain.

== Species ==
As accepted by Species Fungorum;

- Obryzum corniculatum (Hoffm.) Wallr. (1825)
- Obryzum friesii (Keissl.) Nik. Hoffm. & Hafellner (2000)
- Obryzum striguloides Aptroot & Sipman (2001)

Former species;

- O. dolichoterum Nyl. (1872) = Sphaerulina dolichotera, Mycosphaerellaceae family
- O. latitans Nyl. (1885) = Didymellopsis latitans Xanthopyreniaceae family
