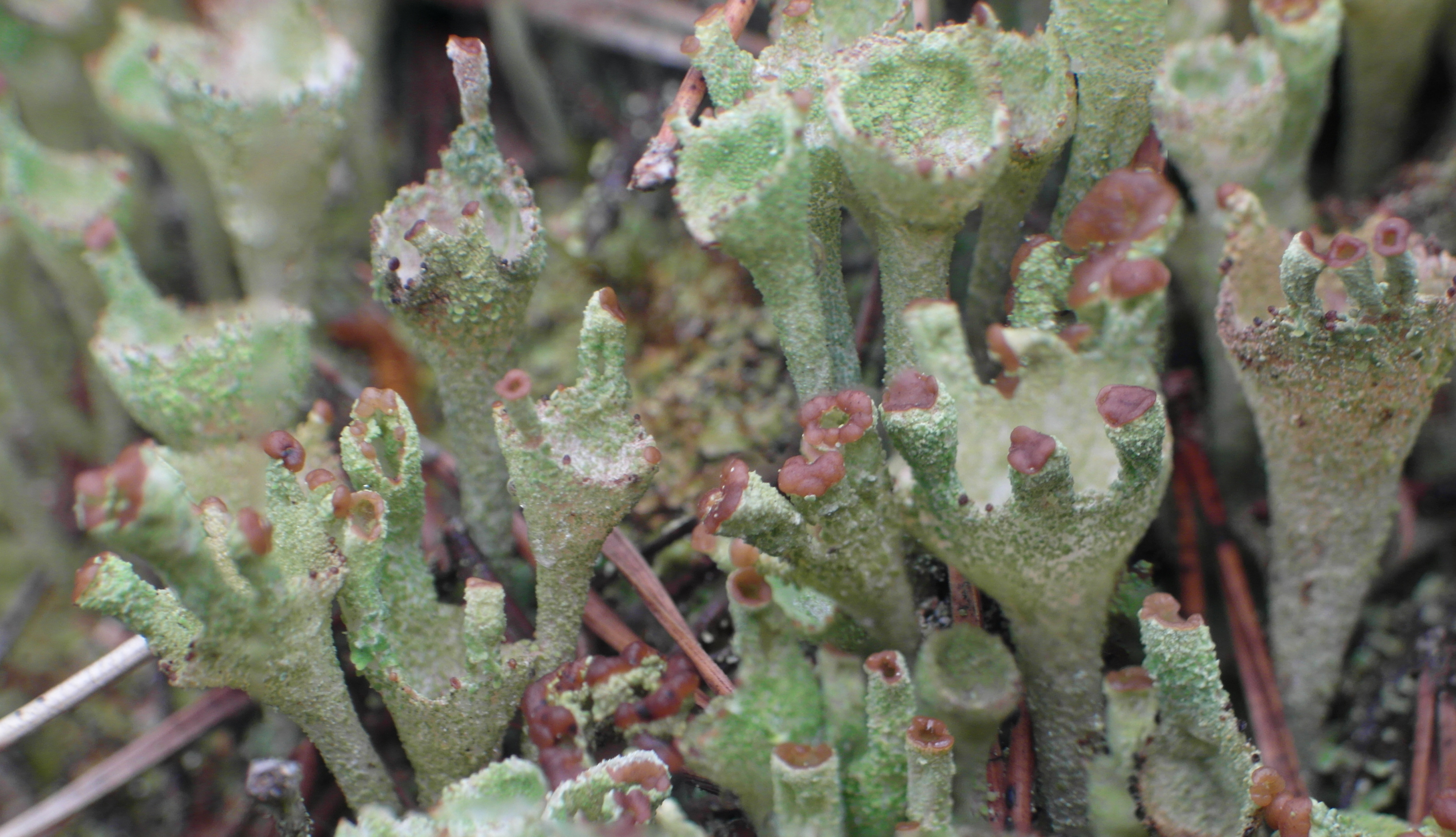

Conservation status
- Secure (NatureServe)

Scientific classification
- Kingdom: Fungi
- Division: Ascomycota
- Class: Lecanoromycetes
- Order: Lecanorales
- Family: Cladoniaceae
- Genus: Cladonia
- Species: C. pyxidata

Binomial name
- Cladonia pyxidata (L.) Hoffm. (1796)

Synonyms
- Baeomyces pyxidatus (L.) Ach.; Cenomyce neglecta (Flörke) Flörke; Cladonia conchata Nyl.; Cladonia pyxidata var. neglecta (Flörke) A. Massal.; Cladonia neglecta (Flörke) Spreng.; Scyphophorus pyxidatus (L.) Gray; Lichen pyxidatus L.; Cenomyce pyxidata (L.) Ach.

= Cladonia pyxidata =

Species of lichen-forming fungus

Cladonia pyxidata or the pebbled cup lichen is a species of cup lichen in the family Cladoniaceae. It is host to the lichenicolous fungus Lichenoconium pyxidatae.

In Nepal, Cladonia pyxidata has been reported from 4,000 to 4,100 m elevation in a compilation of published records.

== See also ==
- List of lichens named by Carl Linnaeus
