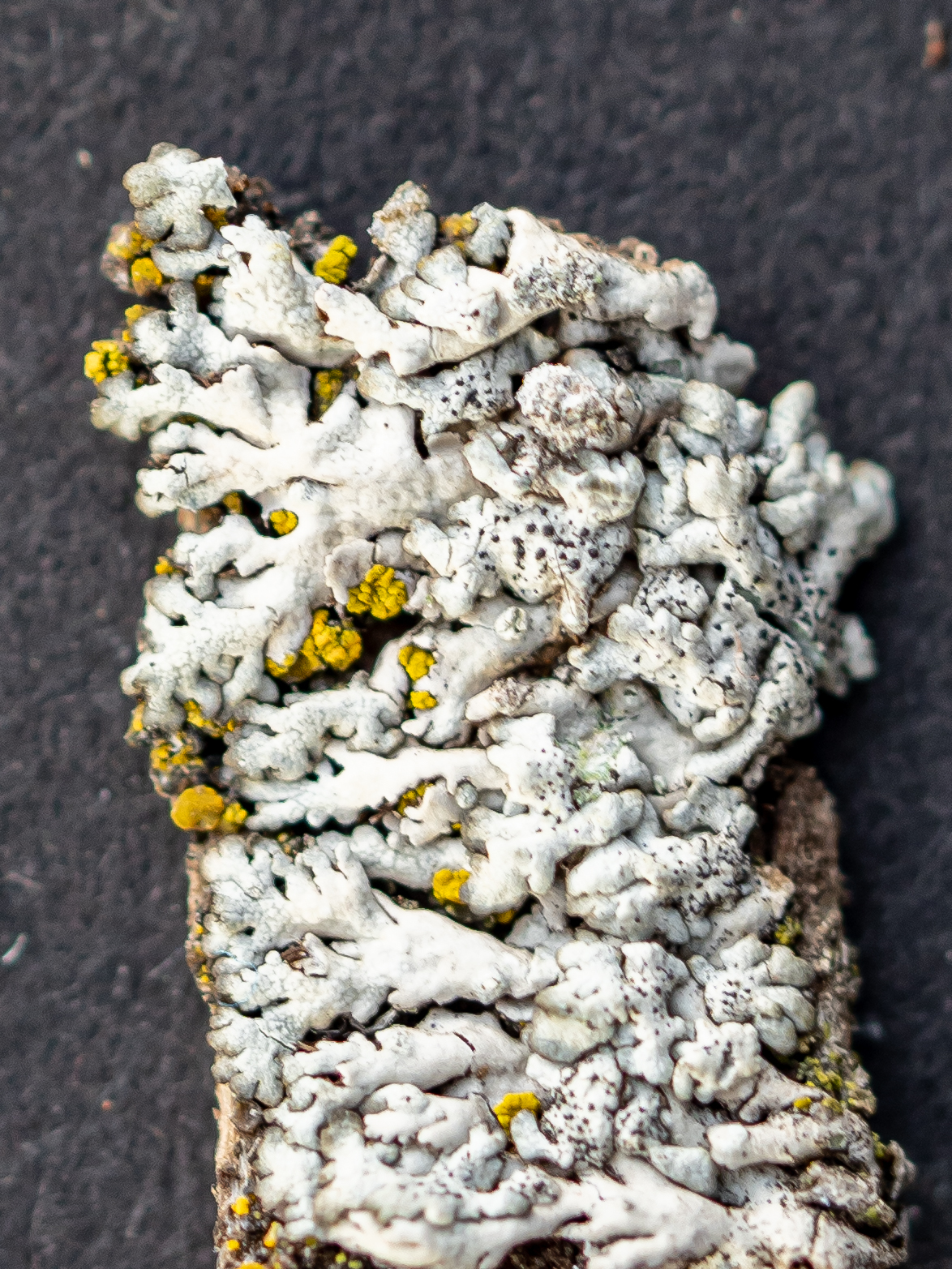
- Polycoccum pulvinatum (black dots) growing on the thallus of a Physcia

Scientific classification
- Kingdom: Fungi
- Division: Ascomycota
- Class: Dothideomycetes
- Order: Trypetheliales
- Family: Polycoccaceae; Ertz, Hafellner & Diederich (2015)

Genera
- Clypeococcum; Polycoccum

= Polycoccaceae =

Family of lichen-dwelling fungi

Polycoccaceae is a family of lichenicolous (lichen-dwelling) fungi in the order Trypetheliales. The family was circumscribed in 2015 by Damien Ertz, Josef Hafellner, and Paul Diederich. Molecular phylogenetic analysis shows Polycoccaceae to have a sister relationship with the family Trypetheliaceae.

Species within the Polycoccaceae distinguish themselves from those in the Trypetheliaceae due to their non-lichenized, lichenicolous nature and typically smaller, 1-septate, brown ascospores. However, both share similarities, such as perithecioid ascomata, intertwined paraphysoids set within a hymenial gel matrix, and bitunicate asci. The primary morphological characteristics of the core group of the family, the type genus Polycoccum, are its thick-walled ascospores that are often distinctly ornamented.

Polycoccaceae comprises two genera: Clypeococcum with 12 species, and Polycoccum with 60 species. All members of this family are lichenicolous, with a collectively wide range of lichen hosts. Among the six families exclusively made up of lichenicolous fungi – including Abrothallaceae, Adelococcaceae, Sarcopyreniaceae, Obryzaceae, and Cyphobasidiaceae – Polycoccaceae is the most species-rich.

== Description ==
The Polycoccaceae are characterised by distinctive features in their reproductive and structural attributes. Ascomata, a primary reproductive structure, originate individually but often group together as they develop. In some cases, they might join via a structure called a clypeus or even become encased in protective galls. Initially, these ascomata are deeply embedded, making only the ostiole, or opening, visible. However, as they mature, the upper half becomes more prominent. These structures, varying from dark brown to black in colour, resemble perithecia, taking on shapes that are nearly spherical to obpyriform. Furthermore, their necks are rather short, blending seamlessly with the main ascomatal wall.

Diving deeper into their structural composition, the ascomatal wall is observed to either maintain uniform thickness or expand slightly around the ostiole. This wall is constructed of 3–6 layers of pseudoparenchymatous cells. When viewed in a vertical cross-section, these cells appear radially compressed, while a surface perspective reveals them to be uniformly shaped, creating a pattern known as textura angularis. The outermost cell layers have evenly thickened walls, adopting a brown to dark brown hue and extending below the central part, or centrum. In contrast, the inner cell layers have a lighter pigmentation, ranging from lightly coloured to clear, composed predominantly of thin-walled cells.

Another significant aspect of the Polycoccaceae is the hamathecium, a structure formed from a dense network of branching, interconnecting filaments. These filaments, potentially classified as trabeculate pseudoparaphyses (or paraphysoids), have variations in septation, ranging from regular to sparse. Notably, the structure lacks periphyses. Furthermore, the hymenial gel, a component of the hamathecium, produces a blue to violet colour when exposed to iodine, though in some instances, it remains unaltered.

Lastly, the asci, essential for reproductive processes, are broad and cylindrical, narrowing down to a short stalk at the base. These structures possess a dual-layered (bitunicate) wall, which splits open at maturity (fissitunicate). The upper part of mature asci is thicker, culminating in a small internal apical beak and can contain between 2 and 8 spores. These spores, positioned irregularly within the asci, are elliptical with a single division. Their size may vary, with the upper half occasionally appearing larger. Maturing to a brown or dark brown shade, their surface might either be smooth or exhibit fine patterns and, in some cases, they are encased within a gelatinous sheath.
