= List of railway stations in Flevoland =

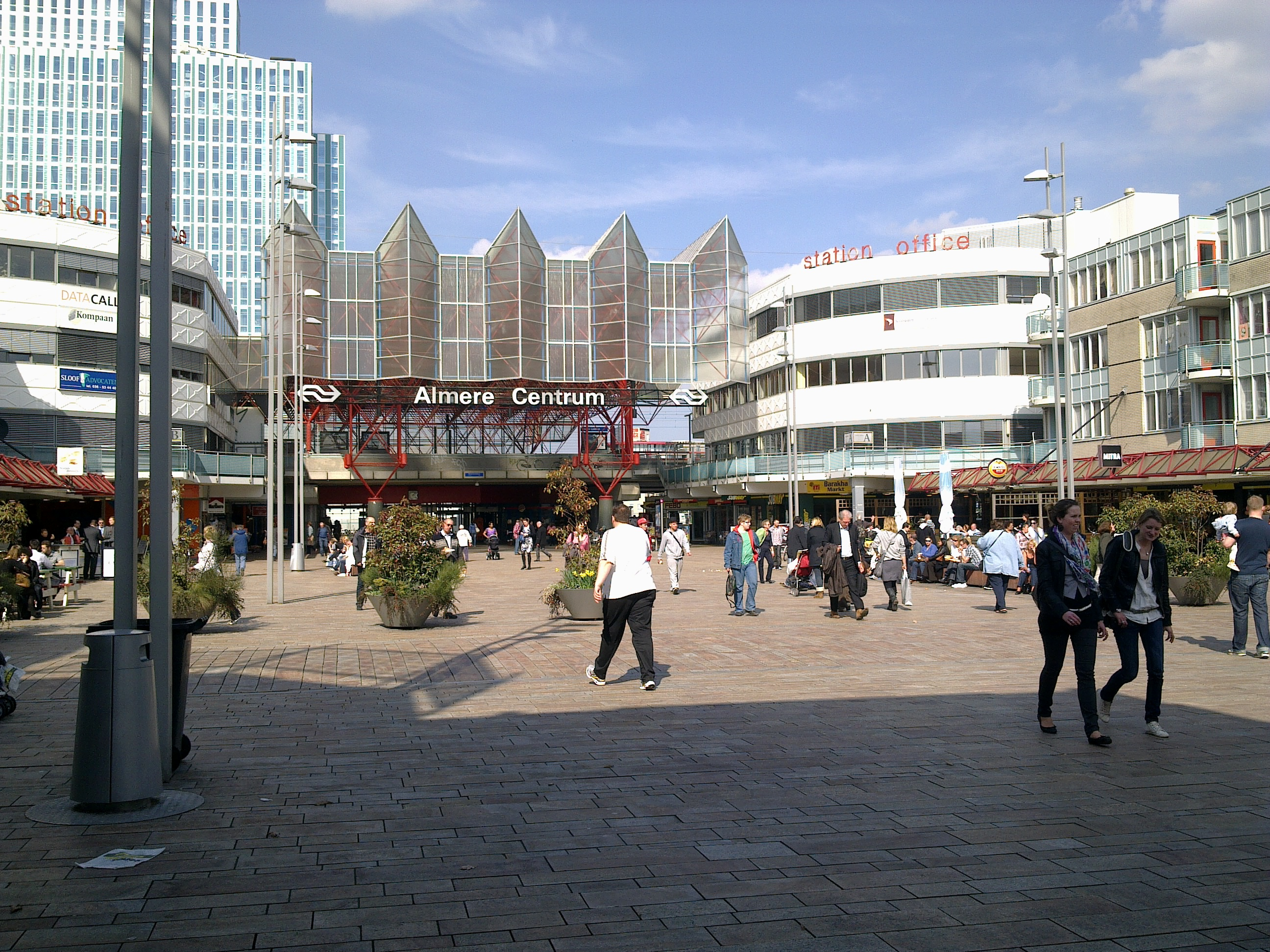
Almere Centrum railway station

This is a list of railway stations in the Dutch province Flevoland:

== Current stations ==
- Almere Buiten railway station
- Almere Centrum railway station
- Almere Muziekwijk railway station
- Almere Oostvaarders railway station
- Almere Parkwijk railway station
- Almere Poort railway station
- Dronten railway station
- Lelystad Centrum railway station

== Future stations ==
- Lelystad Zuid railway station

== Closed stations ==
- Almere Strand railway station

== See also ==
- Railway stations in the Netherlands
