= Poort =

Poort means port in Dutch and may refer to

Places in the Netherlands

- Almere Poort, a borough (stadsdeel) of Almere
  - Almere Poort railway station
- Amsterdamse Poort (disambiguation)
- Gebouw Delftse Poort, a twin-tower skyscraper in Rotterdam
- Haagse Poort, an office building in The Hague

Places in South Africa

- Hex River Poort Pass, a mountain pass
- Howieson's Poort Shelter, an archeological site
  - Howiesons Poort, a cultural period in the Stone Age named after the shelter
- Wyllie's Poort, a road pass

Other

- Poort (surname)
