= Flevoland =

Province of the Netherlands

Flevoland Flevoland (Dutch)
- Province
- Province of Flevoland; Provincie Flevoland (Dutch)
- Flag Coat of arms Brandmark
- Anthem: "Waar wij steden doen verrijzen..." "Where we make cities arise..."
- Location of Flevoland in the Netherlands

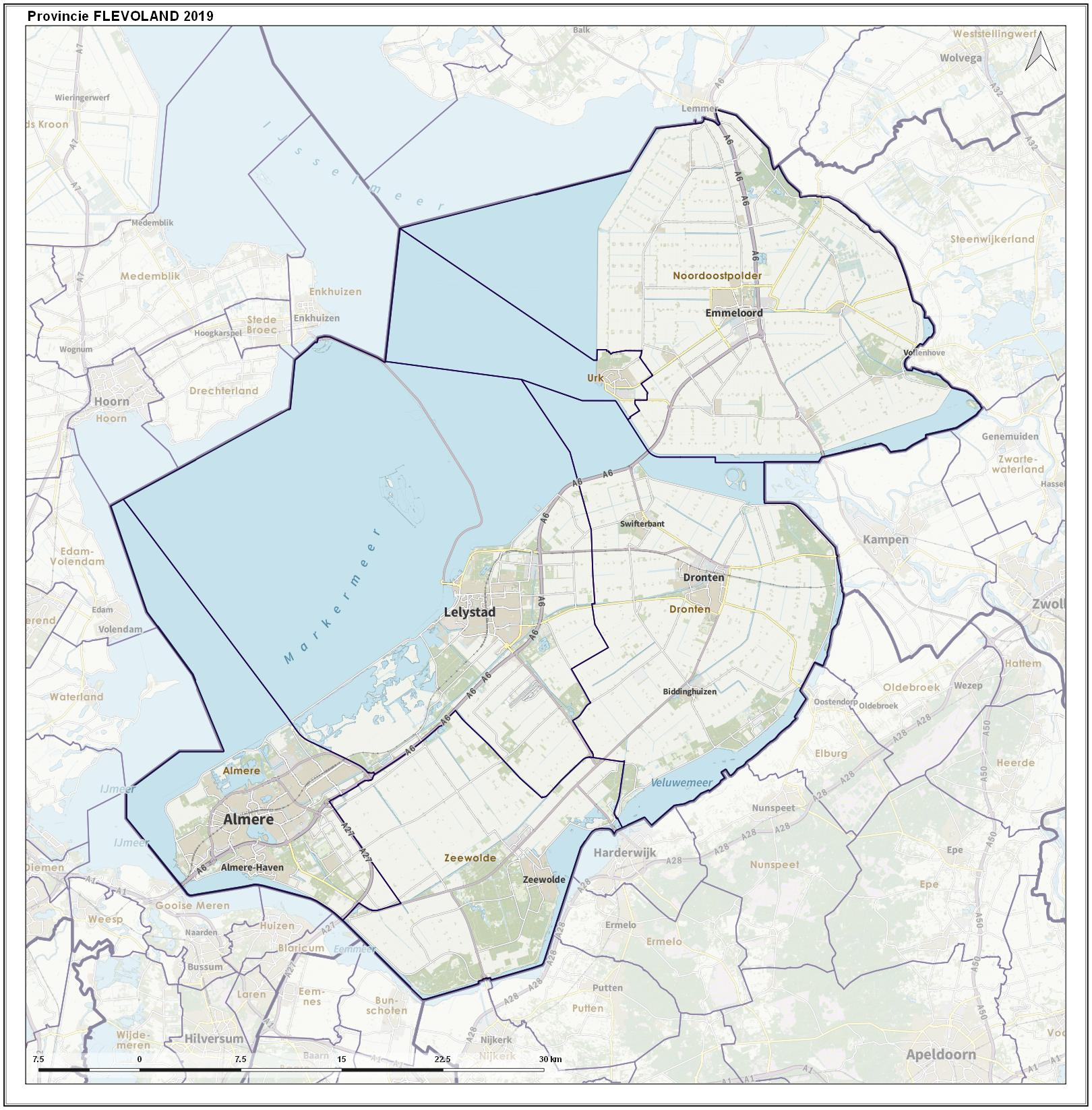
- Topography map of Flevoland
- Coordinates: 52°32′N 5°40′E
- Country: Netherlands
- Inclusion: 1986
- Capital: Lelystad
- Largest city: Almere

Government
  - King's Commissioner: Arjen Gerritsen (VVD)
  - Council: States of Flevoland

Area (2023)
  - Total: 2,412 km^{2} (931 sq mi)
  - Land: 1,410 km^{2} (540 sq mi)
  - Water: 1,002 km^{2} (387 sq mi)
  - Rank: 10th

Population (1 January 2023)
  - Total: 444,701
  - Rank: 11th
  - Density: 315/km^{2} (820/sq mi)
  - Rank: 8th

GDP

GDP
  - Total: €21.879 billion (2024)
  - Per capita: €47,980 (2024)
- ISO 3166 code: NL-FL
- HDI (2021): 0.923 very high · 9th
- Website: www.flevoland.nl

Flevoland (Dutch pronunciation: [ˈfleːvoːlɑnt]) is the twelfth and newest province of the Netherlands, established in 1986, when the southern and eastern Flevopolders, together with the Noordoostpolder, were merged into one provincial entity. It is in the centre of the country in the former Zuiderzee, which was turned into the freshwater IJsselmeer by the closure of the Afsluitdijk in 1932. Almost all of the land belonging to Flevoland was reclaimed in the 1950s and 1960s while splitting the Markermeer and bordering lakes from the IJsselmeer. As to dry land, it is the smallest province of the Netherlands at 1,410 km^{2} (540 mi^{2}), but not gross land as that includes much of the waters of the fresh water lakes (meres) mentioned.

The province had a population of about 445,000 as of January 2023 and consists of six municipalities. Its capital is Lelystad and its most populous city is Almere, which forms part of the Randstad and has grown to become the seventh largest city of the country. Flevoland is bordered in the extreme north by Friesland, in the northeast by Overijssel, and in the northwest by the lakes Markermeer and IJsselmeer. In the southeast, the province borders on Gelderland; in the southwest on Utrecht and North Holland. Outside urban areas, the land in Flevoland is predominantly used for agriculture.

== Etymology ==
Flevoland was named after Lacus Flevo, a name recorded in Roman sources for a large inland lake at the southern end of the later-formed Zuiderzee; it was mentioned by the Roman geographer Pomponius Mela in his De Chorographia in 44 AD. Due to the slowly rising sea level, a number of lakes gradually developed in the Zuiderzee region, which eventually became contiguous. Pomponius wrote about this: "The northern branch of the Rhine extends to Lake Flevo, which encloses an island of the same name and then flows to the sea like a normal river." Other sources speak of Flevum, which means 'flow'. The process continued and gradually the Zuiderzee arose from this lake. The names "Flevoland" and "Vlieland" have the same origin.

== History ==
Between 790 and 1250, Lake Flevo became connected with the North Sea. As a result, a number of villages were swallowed by the sea. The newly created inland sea was called Almere.

After a flood in 1916, the decision was made to enclose and reclaim the Zuiderzee, an inland sea within the Netherlands, and thus the Zuiderzee Works started. Other sources indicate other times and reasons, but also agree that in 1932, the Afsluitdijk was completed, which closed off the sea completely. The Zuiderzee was later divided into IJsselmeer (mere at the end of the river IJssel) and Markermeer, planned to be mostly drained to make the Markerwaard. The Markerwaard was never built due to post-War fiscal austerity.

The first land reclaimed was the northeast polder (Noordoostpolder) in 1942. This took in the former small islands Urk and Schokland. It was at first added to the Province of Overijssel.

In the southwest the Flevopolder – larger than the above – was then reclaimed; its northeastern half in 1957 and its southwestern half in 1968.

A key feature of the latter is a narrow body of water kept at three metres below sea level along the former coastline, to stabilize the water table and prevent coastal towns from losing their waterfront and access to the sea. Thus, the Flevopolder became an artificial island joined to the mainland by bridges. The municipalities on the three parts voted to become a province, shortly before this was effected in 1986.

Since that time, Flevoland is the youngest of the 12 provinces of the Netherlands, having been granted this status in 1986. Its current sources of revenue are the cultivation of flowers, farming and tourism. In recent times, it has built many wind turbines as a source of renewable energy.

== Geography ==
=== Zuiderzee Works ===
Eastern Flevoland (Oostelijk Flevoland or Oost-Flevoland) and Southern Flevoland (Zuidelijk Flevoland or Zuid-Flevoland), unlike the Noordoostpolder, have broad channel between them and the mainland: the Veluwemeer and Gooimeer, respectively, making them, together, the world's largest artificial island.

They are two polders with a joint hydrological infrastructure, with a dividing dike in the middle, the Knardijk, that will keep one polder safe if the other is flooded. The two main drainage canals that traverse the dike can be closed by floodgates in such an event. The pumping stations are the Wortman (diesel powered) at Lelystad-Haven, the Lovink near Harderwijk on the eastern dike and the Colijn (both electrically powered) along the northern dike beside the Ketelmeer.

A new element in the design of Eastern Flevoland is the larger city Lelystad (1966), named after Cornelis Lely, the man who had played a crucial role in designing and realising the Zuiderzee Works. Other more conventional settlements already existed by then; Dronten, the major local town, was founded in 1962, followed by two smaller satellite villages, Swifterbant and Biddinghuizen, in 1963. These three were incorporated in the new municipality of Dronten on 1 January 1972.

Southern Flevoland has only one pumping station, the diesel-powered De Blocq van Kuffeler. Because of the hydrological union of the two Flevolands, it simply joins the other three in maintaining the water level of both polders. Almere relieves the housing shortage and increasing overcrowding on the old land. Its name is derived from the early medieval name for Lake Almere. Almere was to be divided into three major settlements initially; the first, Almere-Haven (1976) situated along the coast of the Gooimeer (one of the peripheral lakes), the second and largest was to fulfill the role of city centre as Almere-Stad (1980), and the third was Almere-Buiten (1984) to the northwest towards Lelystad. In 2003, the municipality made a new Structuurplan which started development of three new settlements: Overgooi in the southeast, Almere-Hout in the east, and Almere-Poort in the West. In time, Almere-Pampus could be developed in the northwest, with possibly a new bridge over the IJmeer towards Amsterdam.

The Oostvaardersplassen is a landscape of shallow pools, islets, and swamps. Originally, this low part of the new polder was destined to become an industrial area. Spontaneous settlement of interesting flora and fauna turned the area into a nature park, of such importance that the new railway line was diverted. The recent decline in agricultural land use will in time make expanding natural land use possible, and connect the Oostvaardersplassen to the Veluwe.

The centre of the polder most closely resembles the prewar polders in that it is almost exclusively agricultural. In contrast, the southeastern part is dominated by extensive forests. Here is also found the only other settlement of the polder, Zeewolde (1984), again a more conventional town acting as the local centre. Zeewolde became a municipality at the same time as Almere, on 1 January 1984, which in the case of Zeewolde meant that the municipality existed before the town itself, with only farms in the surrounding land to be governed until the town started to grow.

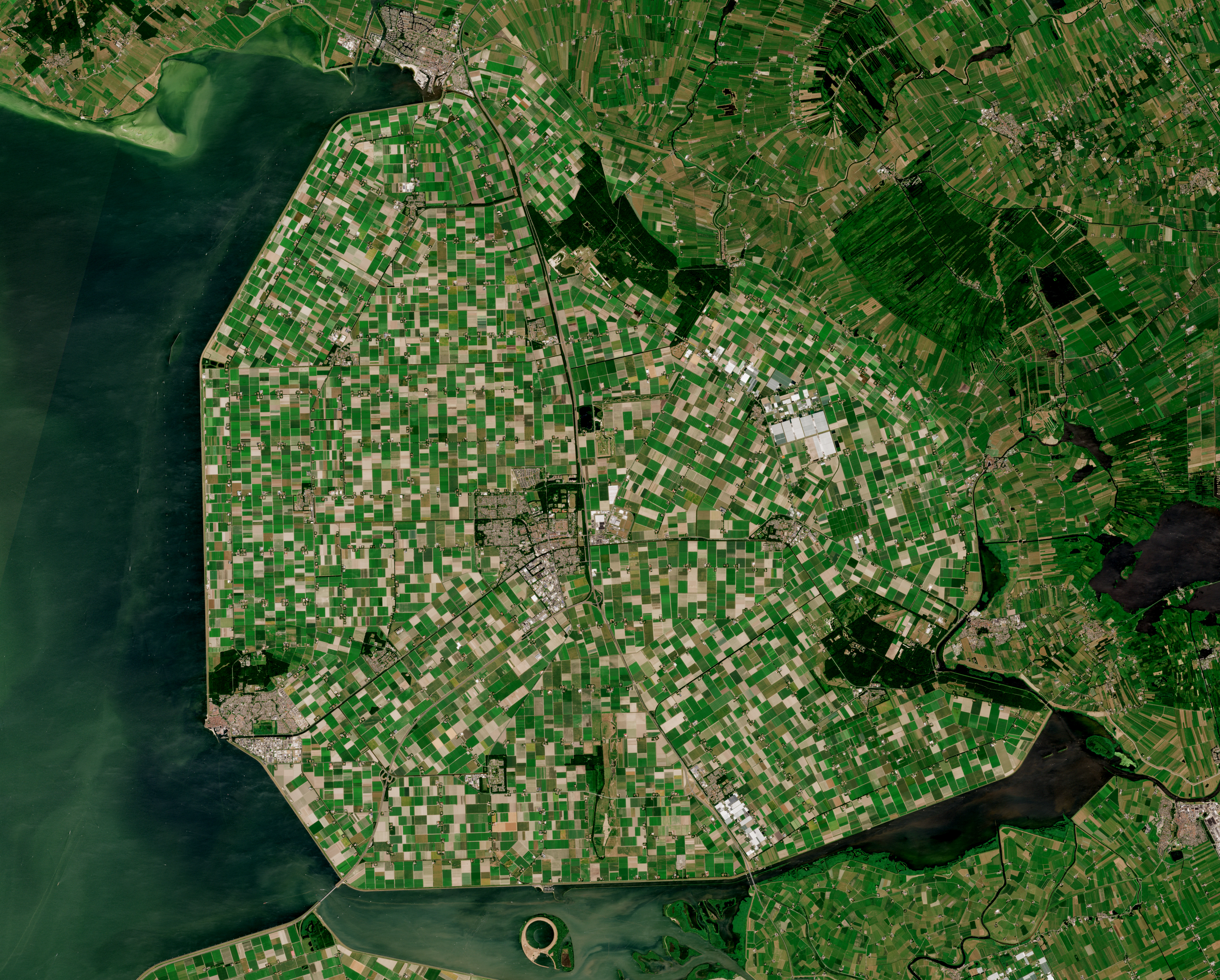
Northeastern Flevoland: Noordoostpolder

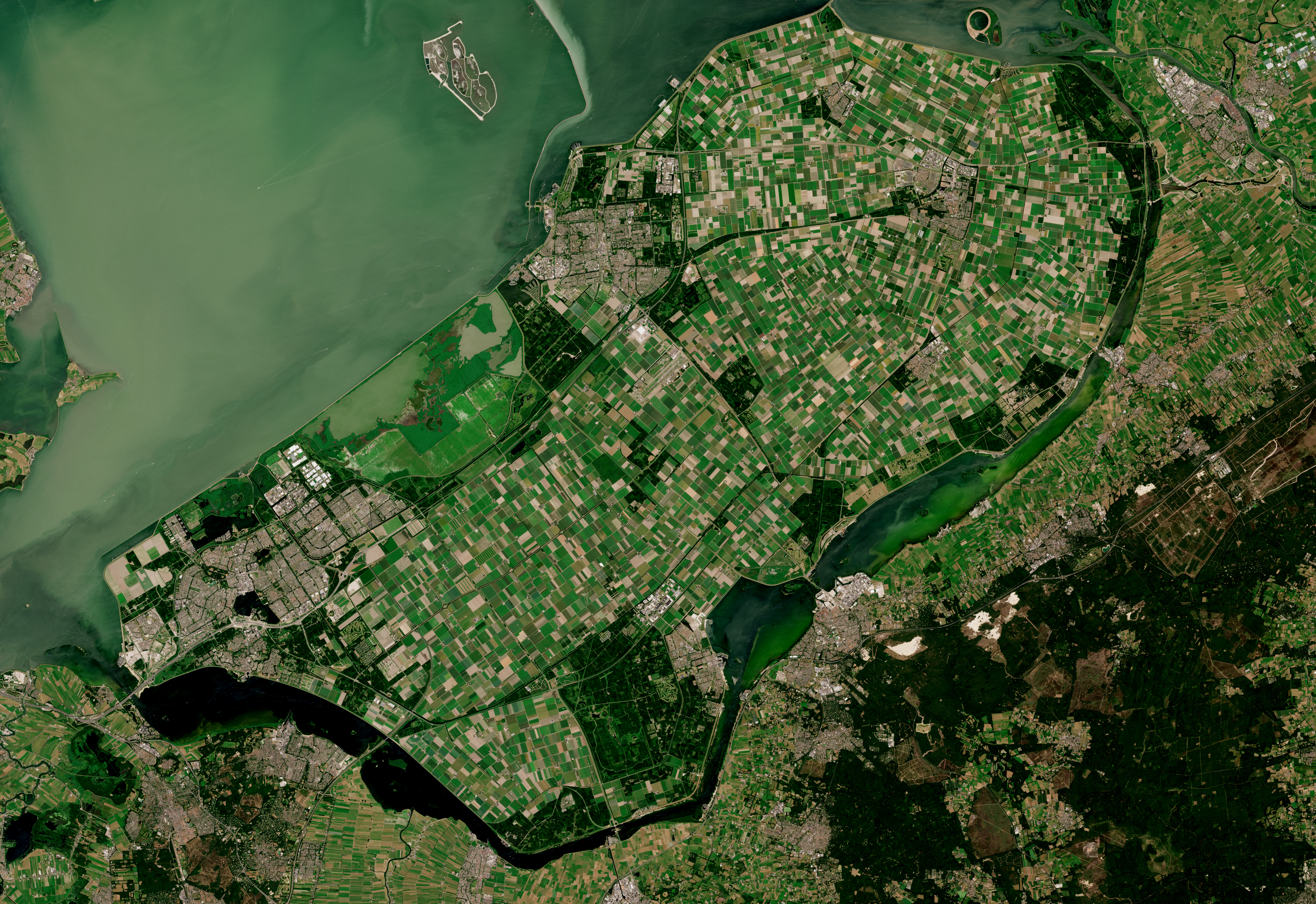
Eastern and Southern Flevoland: Flevopolder

=== Municipalities ===
1. Almere – far west of southern island
2. Dronten – far east of southern island
3. Lelystad – middle of northern edge of southern island
4. Noordoostpolder – most of north-eastern polder
5. Urk – small area on west of north-eastern polder
6. Zeewolde – southern part of southern island

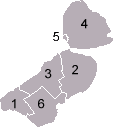
Gemeenten in Flevoland

== Demographics ==
Historical population
Year	Pop.	±%
1986	177,000	—
1990	211,507	+19.5%
2000	317,206	+50.0%
2010	387,881	+22.3%
2020	423,021	+9.1%
2026	462,880	+9.4%
Source: Population dynamics; birth, death and migration per region], CBS StatLine, 4 August 2023

On 1 January 2023, Flevoland had a total population of 444,701 and a population density of 315/km^{2} (820/sq mi). It is the 2nd least populous province of the Netherlands, with only Zeeland having fewer people. The city of Almere is the most populous municipality in the province.

== Religion ==
Religion in Flevoland (2015)
1. Not religious (55.2%)
2. Protestant Church in the Netherlands (15.5%)
3. Catholicism (12.2%)
4. Other (9.90%)
5. Islam (7.20%)

In 2015, 15.5% of the population belonged to the Protestant Church in the Netherlands while 12.3% was Roman Catholic, 7.2% was Muslim and 9.9% belonged to other churches or faiths. Over half (55.2%) of the population identified as non-religious.

Religion per municipality in Flevoland (2014) (% of local population)
Municipality	Religious (total)	Protestant			Catholic Church	Islam	Judaism	Hinduism	Buddhism	Others
Municipality	Religious (total)	Protestant Church (PKN)	Dutch Reformed (NHK)	Reformed Churches	Catholic Church	Islam	Judaism	Hinduism	Buddhism	Others
Almere	38.3	3.8	2.9	1.6	13.8	5.9	0.3	2.2	0.5	7.3
Dronten	45.1	9.2	6.7	8.5	12.1	2.7	0.1	0.1	0.0	5.7
Lelystad	36.3	3.5	3.4	4.0	10.2	6.1	0.0	1.3	1.0	6.8
Noordoostpolder	52.3	12.7	7.1	9.3	14.6	0.5	0.0	0.1	0.2	7.7
Urk	97.7	21.8	14.7	45.7	1.7	0.0	0.0	0.0	0.0	13.8
Zeewolde	45.7	10.2	5.5	12.1	10.2	0.2	0.0	0.0	0.0	7.4

== Politics ==
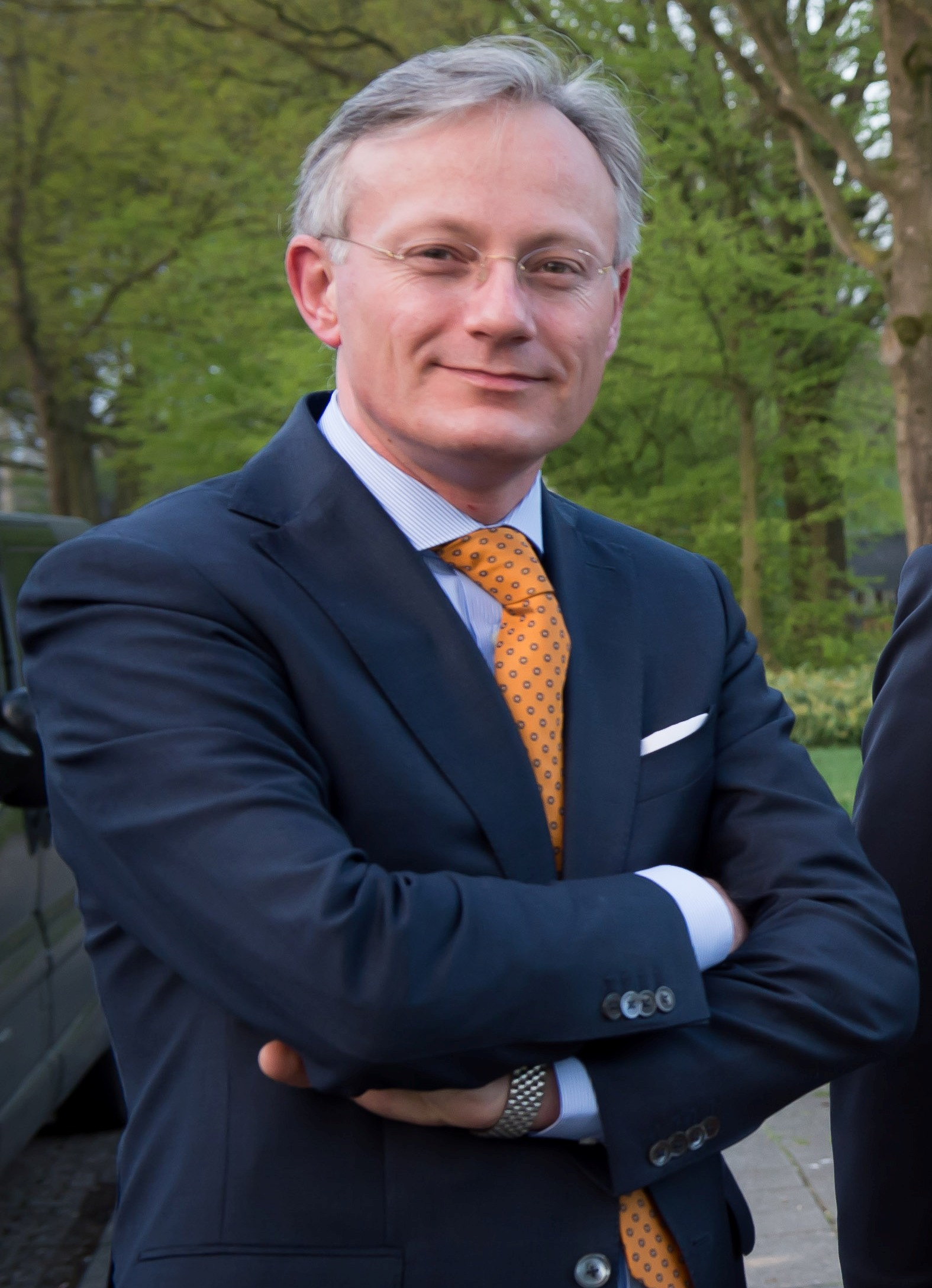
Arjen Gerritsen, the King's Commissioner of Flevoland

Since 2023, the King's Commissioner of Flevoland is Arjen Gerritsen, who is a member of the People's Party for Freedom and Democracy (VVD).

The Provincial Council of Flevoland has 41 seats. At the provincial elections in March 2023, the Farmer–Citizen Movement (BBB) became the largest party with 10 seats. The People's Party for Freedom and Democracy (VVD) is second largest with 4 seats, after which the Party for Freedom (PVV), Labour Party (PvdA) and Green Left (Dutch: GroenLinks, GL) won 3 seats each. Christian Democratic Appeal (CDA), Democrats 66 (D66), Party for the Animals (PvdD), Socialist Party (SP), Christian Union (CU), Reformed Political Party (SGP), JA21 and Forum for Democracy (FVD) all won 2 seats each. 50PLUS and Strong Local Flevoland (SLP), a regional party, both won 1 seat each.

== Economy ==
The gross domestic product (GDP) of the province was €14 billion in 2018, accounting for 1.8% of the Netherlands' economic output. GDP per capita adjusted for purchasing power was €29,500 or 98% of the EU27 average in the same year.

== Transport ==
=== Rail ===
The Flevopolder is served by the Flevolijn, running from Weesp to Lelystad, and the Hanzelijn, continuing from Lelystad towards Zwolle. The two railways stations of the province with intercity services are Almere Centrum and Lelystad Centrum.

Trajectory	Railway stations in Flevoland
Weesp–Lelystad	North Holland – Almere Poort – Almere Muziekwijk – Almere Centrum – Almere Parkwijk – Almere Buiten – Almere Oostvaarders – Lelystad Centrum
Lelystad–Zwolle	Lelystad Centrum – Dronten – Overijssel

Furthermore, Lelystad Zuid is a planned railway station between Almere Oostvaarders and Lelystad Centrum. It has been partially constructed preceding the opening of the railway in 1988, but construction has been put on indefinite hold because of slower-than-expected development of the city of Lelystad.

Amongst the cities with direct train connections to Flevoland are Amsterdam, Utrecht, The Hague, Zwolle, Groningen, Leeuwarden and Schiphol Airport.

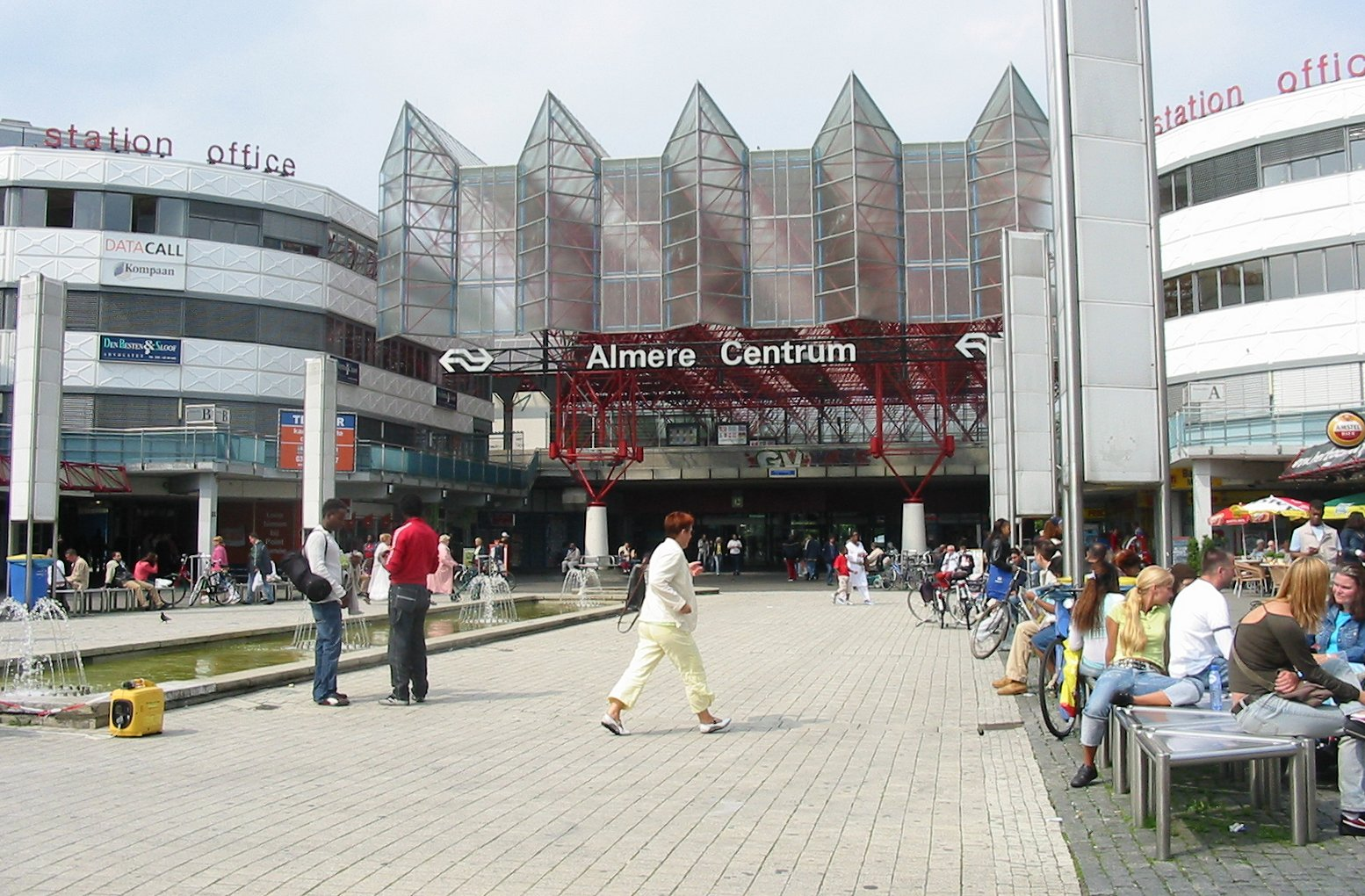
Almere Centrum railway station

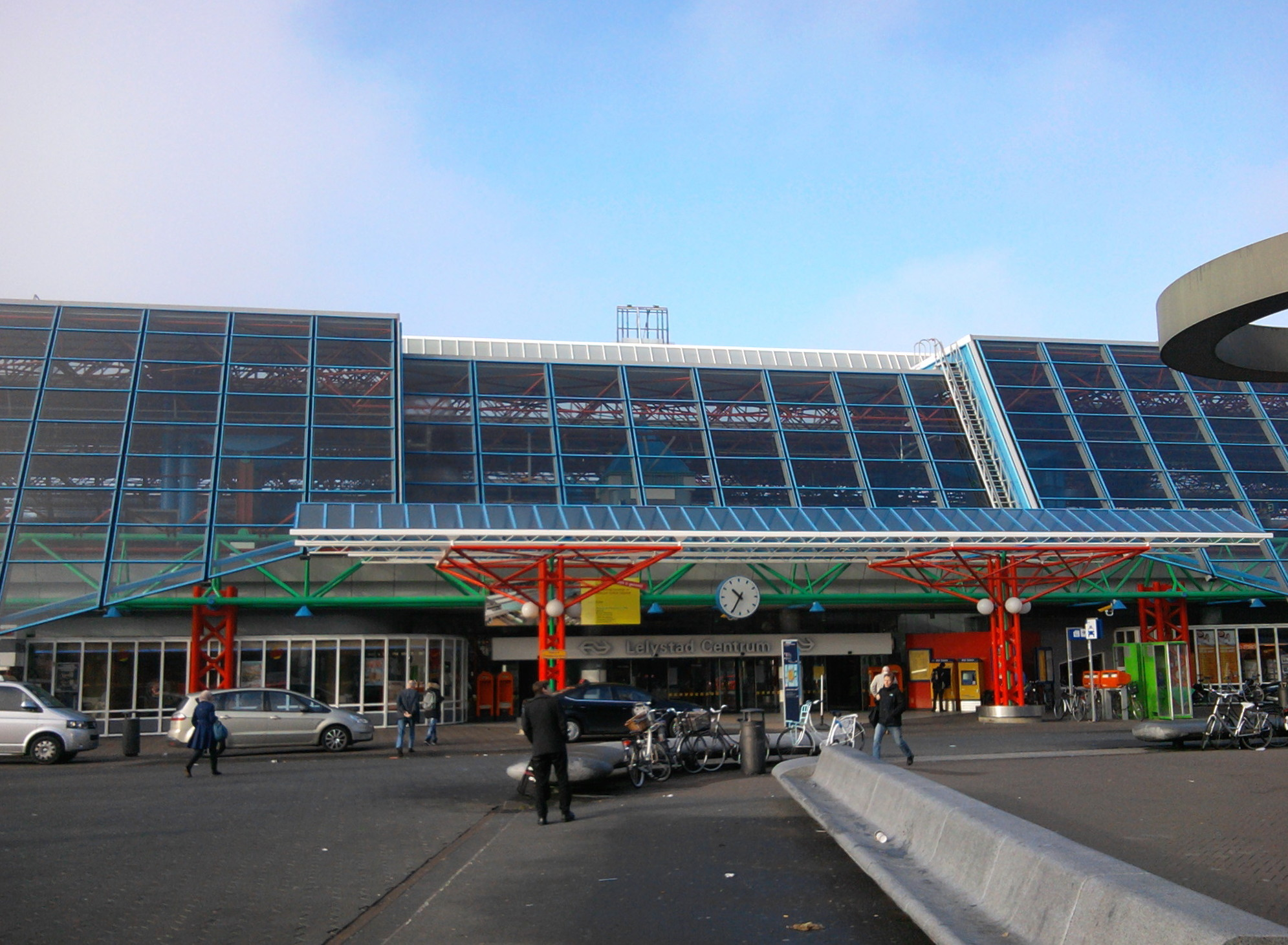
Lelystad Centrum railway station

=== Airport ===
There is one airport in the province: Lelystad Airport. A second airport, Noordoostpolder Airport near Emmeloord, was closed in the late 1990s due to town expansion.

== Events ==
- A Campingflight to Lowlands Paradise
- Floriade 2022
