= Almere Poort =

Coordinates: 52°21′0″N 5°9′21″E

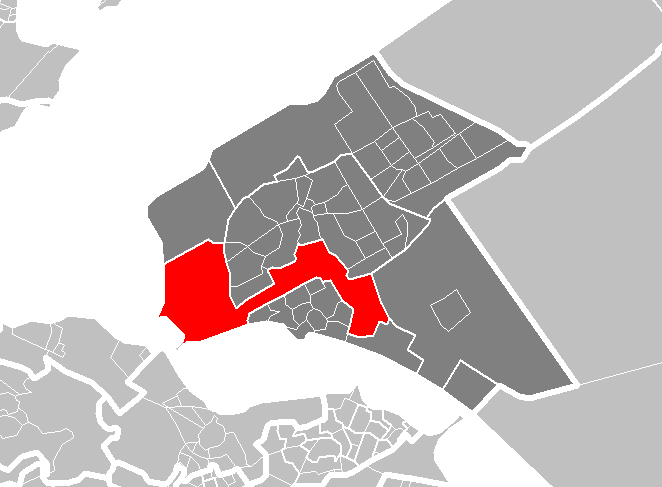
Map of Almere Poort

Almere Poort is a borough (stadsdeel) of Almere, Netherlands. It is the newest part of what is a new city itself, with the first building completed only in 2005. Although Almere is a planned city, Almere Poort was not in the original city plans, but is rather a result of revised urban planning in accordance to Almere's more recent development plans assuming much higher target population and more prominent role as a satellite urban centre to Amsterdam.

Almere Poort is located on the western bank of the IJmeer, with the Almeerderstrand beach forming the borough's (as well as municipality's and province's) western boundary. It borders Almere Haven to the south, Almere Stad to the east and the yet-undeveloped (as of 2012) designated district of Almere Pampus to the North. The A6 motorway runs along the borough's southern border, with one exit at Poortdreef and one at Hogering, the latter of which runs along the eastern border. The Flevolijn railway line runs semi-diagonally across the borough, with local trains stopping at the borough's station Almere Poort railway station. The former Almere Strand railway station, which was serviced only during events at Almeerderstrand, was also within the boundaries of Almere Poort. It was demolished in 2012. Since then, buses run between Almere Poort station and Almeerderstrand during events.

Almere Poort differs from the other boroughs and districts in that residential development does not follow the model typical for other districts of Almere, which is mostly large-scale single-family housing developments built according to a common plan. Contrary to this, the district features both high-density apartment buildings, as well as land parcels available for free private housing development. Also contrary to older districts of Almere, Almere-Poort refers to its residential areas as kwartieren rather than wijken. The designated parts of Almere Poort according to the official website of the municipality are:

1. Homeruskwartier - featuring land plots for private housing development, with streets named after mythological beings and characters featured in the works of Homer
2. Europakwartier - consisting of large-scale apartment buildings with an urban atmosphere, divided by the railway tracks into Europakwartier-West and Europakwartier-Oost. The street naming after European countries generally follows the east-west geographic location of countries
3. Columbuskwartier - this residential district has streets named after famous explorers such as Christopher Columbus himself
4. Olympiakwartier and Olympia Office Park are to be constructed around the Almere Poort railway station to form the district's multi-functional and prestigious centre.
5. Duin which will feature beach condo's and sand hills close to the beach of Almeerderstrand and Marina Muiderzand.
6. Cascadepark - a park between Homeruskwartier and Europakwartier with its first trees planted in 2008
7. Kustzone - the coastal zone along the Almeerderstrand is designated for mixed development, including residential buildings, hotels, leisure facilities and some commerce
8. Hogekant - this commercial area in the Western extremity of the district is designated for industrial use, mostly by small and mid-sized enterprises in the craft and service sectors
9. Middenkant - separated with a canal from the Hogekant is to provide a more high-quality neighbourhood for SMEs
10. Lagekant - this commercial area is designated for large and international companies in the service sector
