= Almere Parkwijk railway station =

Railway station in the Netherlands

Almere Parkwijk
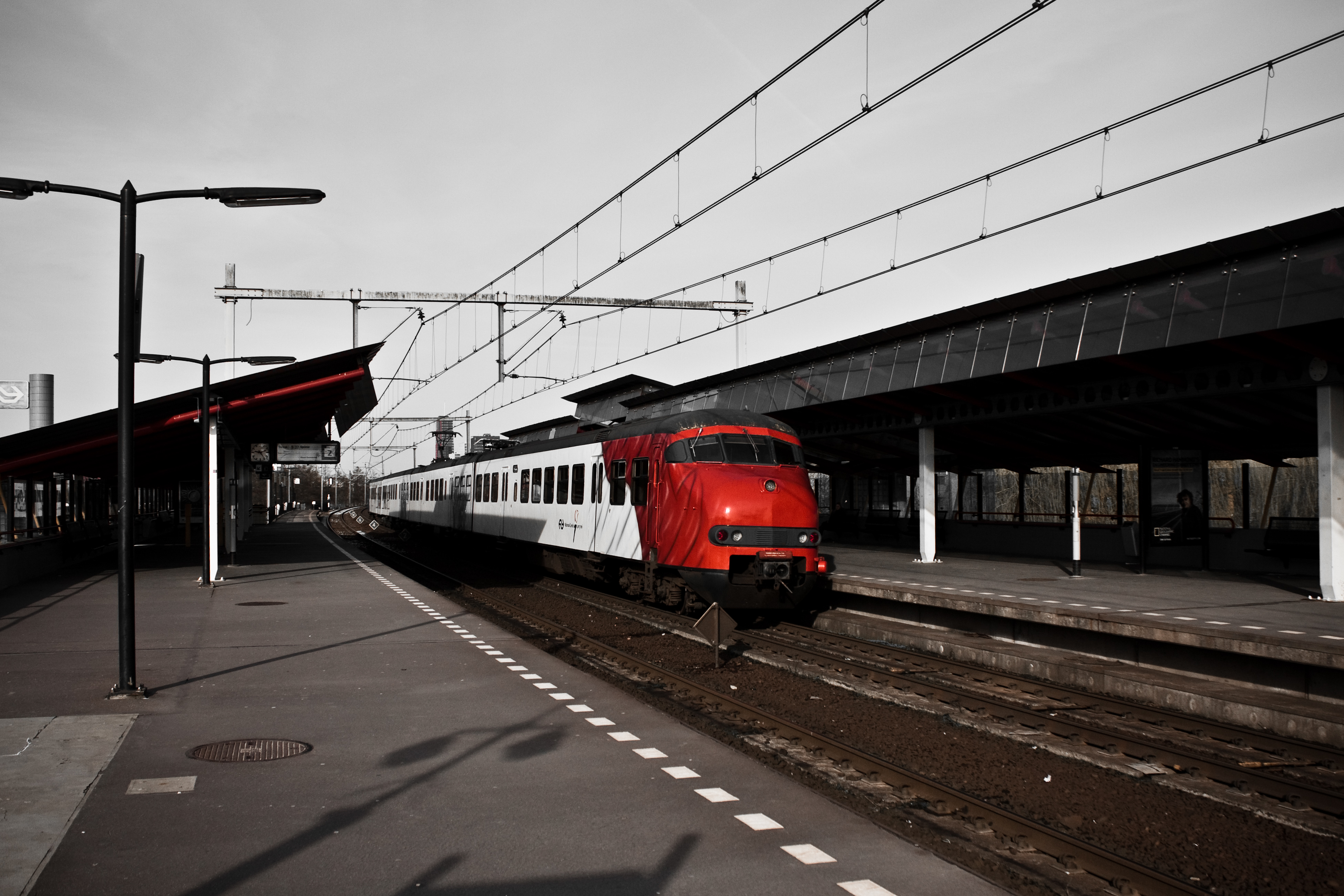

General information
- Location: Netherlands
- Coordinates: 52°22′36″N 5°14′40″E
- Line: Weesp–Lelystad railway
- Platforms: 2

History
- Opened: 1 February 1996; 30 years ago

Services
Preceding station	Nederlandse Spoorwegen	Following station
Almere Centrum towards Den Haag Centraal	NS Sprinter 4300	Almere Buiten towards Lelystad Centrum
Almere Centrum towards Amsterdam Centraal	NS Sprinter 4600 until 20:00	Almere Buiten towards Almere Oostvaarders
Location
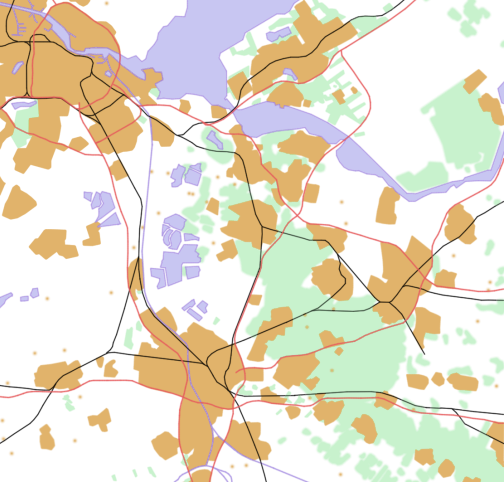
- Location within Northeastern Randstad

Almere Parkwijk is a railway station which lies in Almere, in the Netherlands. It is located approximately 24 km (15 mi) east of Amsterdam. It is on the Weesp–Lelystad railway. The station is on the newest polder in the Netherlands, the Flevopolder which is in the Flevoland province. The station was opened on 1 February 1996. Although the station was built nine years after the other Almere stations it is styled in the same way as Almere Muziekwijk and Almere Buiten.

Almere has become a commuter city for Amsterdam. The first house was built in 1976 and on 7 July 2008, it was recorded that there were 184 405 citizens living in Almere. The station lies in the centre of the 'Parkwijk' the Park Estate and the 'Verzetswijk'.

== Train services ==
As of 11 December 2016, the following train services call at this station:

- Local Sprinter services Hoofddorp - Schiphol Airport - Amsterdam Zuid - Almere Oostvaarders
- Local Sprinter services The Hague - Schiphol Airport - Amsterdam - Weesp - Almere - Lelystad - Zwolle

== Bus services ==
- 5: Muziekwijk - Kruidenwijk - Almere Centrum - Parkwijk - Landgoederenbuurt - Station Buiten - Oostvaarders
- 6: Noorderplassen - Kruidenwijk - Almere Centrum - Danswijk - Parkwijk
- 7: Almere Centrum - Parkwijk - Tussen de Vaarten - Sallandsekant
- 155: Holendrecht - Bijlmer ArenA - Bijlmermeer - Muiden P&R - Almere Gooisekant - Almere Parkwijk
- 216: Almere Buiten - Almere Stad - Muiden - Amstelveen - Schiphol Oost
- 322: Amsterdam Amstel - Muiden P&R - Almere Poort - Gooisekant - Almere Parkwijk
- 323: Amsterdam Bijlmer ArenA - Muiden P&R - Almere Poort - Gooisekant - Almere Parkwijk

=== Night Buses ===
Bus Service	Operator	From	To	Via	Notes
N11	Connexxion	Station Almere Centrum	Station Almere Centrum	Waterwijk, Molenbuurt, Station Almere Buiten, Station Almere Oostvaarders, Tussen De Vaarten, Station Almere Parkwijk, Danswijk, Filmwijk	Loop line
N12	Connexxion	Station Almere Centrum	Station Almere Centrum	Filmwijk, Danswijk, Station Almere Parkwijk, Tussen De Vaarten, Station Almere Oostvaarders, Station Almere Buiten, Molenbuurt, Waterwijk	Loop line
