= Almere Strand railway station =

Railway station in Almere, the Netherlands

Almere Strand
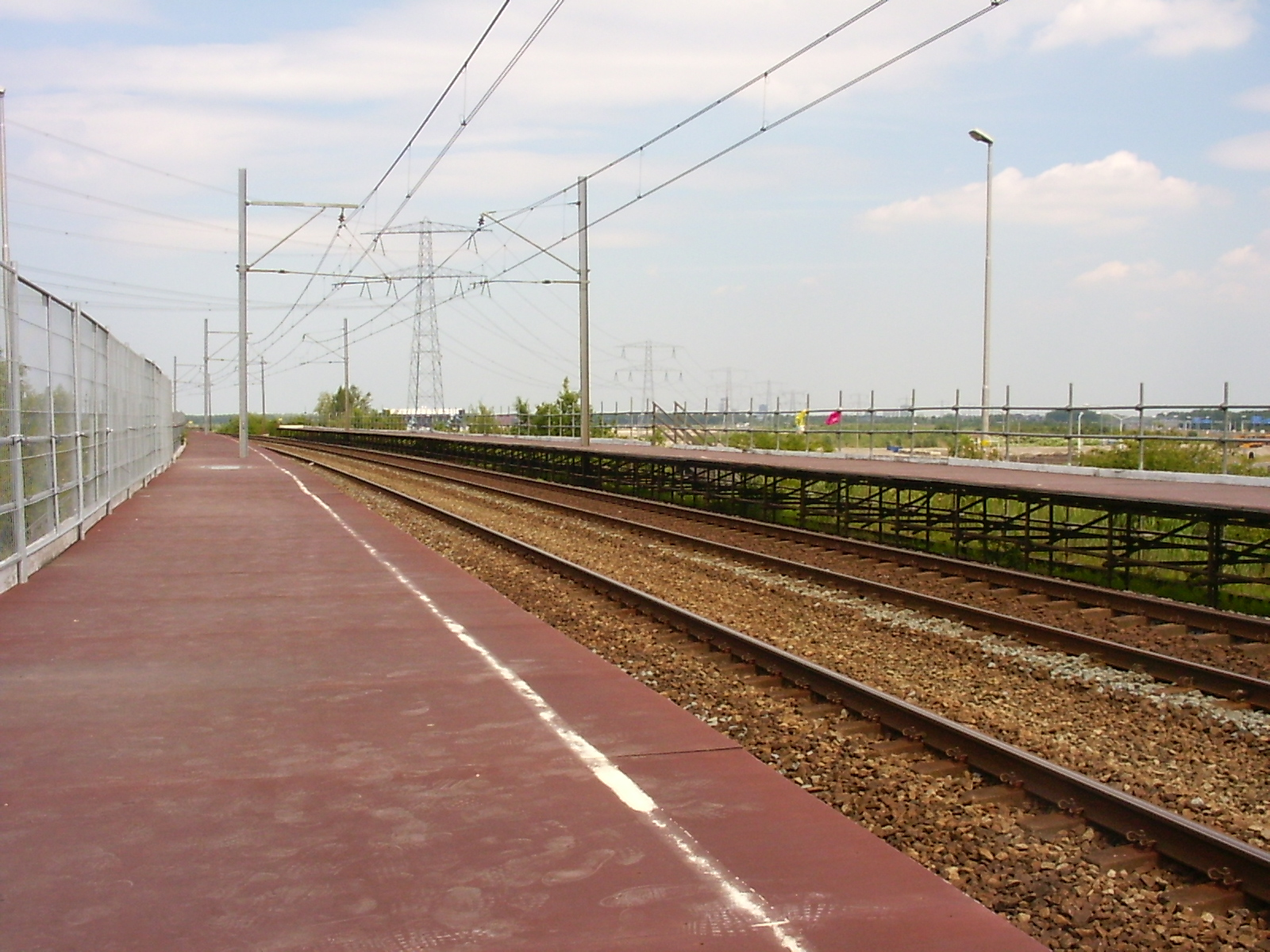

General information
- Location: Almere, Netherlands
- Coordinates: 52°19′58″N 5°8′56″E
- Line: Weesp–Lelystad railway
- Platforms: 2

Other information
- Station code: Alms

History
- Opened: 1 May 1996; 30 years ago
- Closed: 6 October 2012; 14 years ago
Location
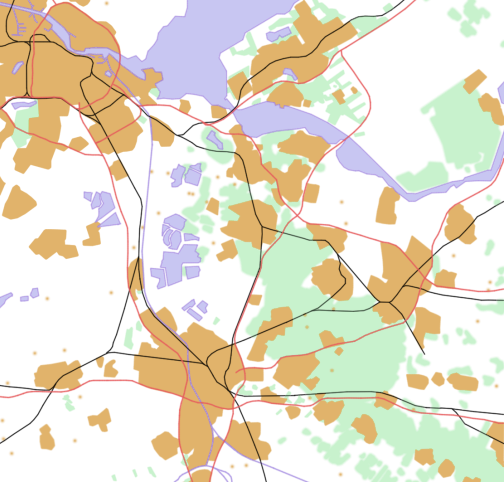
- Location within Northeastern Randstad

Almere Strand railway station (English: Almere Beach) was a railway station in Almere, Netherlands. It was located on the Weesp–Lelystad railway (Flevolijn) between Weesp, North Holland and Almere Muziekwijk, Flevoland. Almere Strand station was served only during the Libelle Zomerweek and during events at the nearby beach. Trains at this station were operated by Nederlandse Spoorwegen.

The station, which had two platforms with no facilities, was first opened on 1 May 1996 before being closed on 1 July 1996. It remained closed until 1 June 1999, when it reopened. It was closed permanently in October 2012, shortly before Almere Poort railway station opened.
