= Waar wij steden doen verrijzen... =

Anthem of Flevoland, the Netherlands

English: Where We Let Cities Arise...
- Flag of Flevoland
- Provincial anthem of Flevoland
- Lyrics: Mak Zeiler
- Music: Riemer van der Meulen
- Adopted: Unknown

Waar wij steden doen verrijzen is the anthem of the province of Flevoland in the Netherlands. The lyrics were written by Mak Zeiler; Riemer van der Meulen wrote the melody. The victory over the water is central in the anthem, like in the flag of Flevoland.

== Lyrics ==
Waar wij steden doen verrijzen
op de bodem van de zee,
onder Hollands wolkenhemel
tellen wij als twaalfde mee.
Een provincie die er wezen mag,
jongste stukje Nederland.
Waar het fijn is om te wonen,
mijn geliefde Flevoland!

Land gemaakt door mensenhanden,
vol vertrouwen en met kracht.
Waar de zee werd teruggedrongen
die zoveel verschrikking bracht.
Een provincie die er wezen mag,
jongste stukje Nederland.
Waar het fijn is om te werken,
mijn geliefde Flevoland!

De natuur laat zich hier gelden
dieren kiezen nest of hol.
En de wijde vergezichten
stemmen ons zo vreugdevol.
Een provincie die er wezen mag,
jongste stukje Nederland.
Waar het fijn is om te leven,
mijn geliefde Flevoland!

Translation:

Where we build up cities
at the bottom of the sea,
under Holland's cloudy sky
we count as the twelfth.
A province that's not bad,
youngest part of the Netherlands.
Where it is nice to live,
my beloved Flevoland!

Land created by human hands,
with confidence and strength.
Where the sea was pushed back
which brought so much horror.
A province that's not at all bad,
youngest part of the Netherlands.
Where it is nice to work,
my beloved Flevoland!

Nature shows itself here
animals choose a nest or hole.
And the wide views
make us feel so joyful.
A province that's not bad,
youngest part of the Netherlands.
Where it is nice to live,
my beloved Flevoland!
