= Almere Poort railway station =

Railway station in the Netherlands

Almere Poort
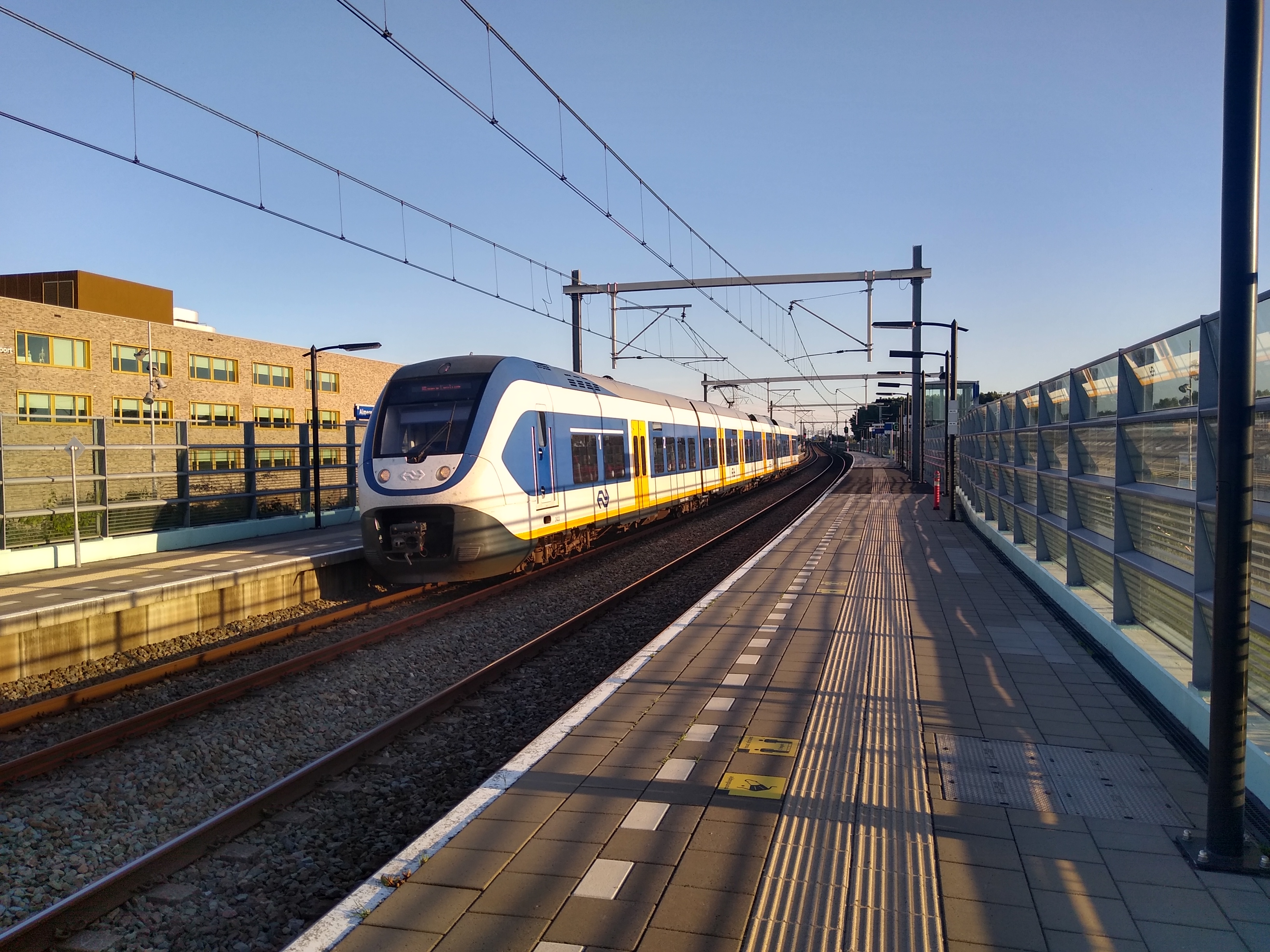

General information
- Location: Netherlands
- Coordinates: 52°20′34″N 5°9′7″E
- Line: Weesp–Lelystad railway

Other information
- Station code: Ampo

History
- Opened: 9 December 2012; 13 years ago

Services
Preceding station	Nederlandse Spoorwegen	Following station
Weesp towards Den Haag Centraal	NS Sprinter 4300	Almere Muziekwijk towards Lelystad Centrum
Weesp towards Amsterdam Centraal	NS Sprinter 4600 until 20:00	Almere Muziekwijk towards Almere Oostvaarders
Naarden-Bussum towards Utrecht Centraal	NS Sprinter 4900	Almere Muziekwijk towards Almere Centrum
Location
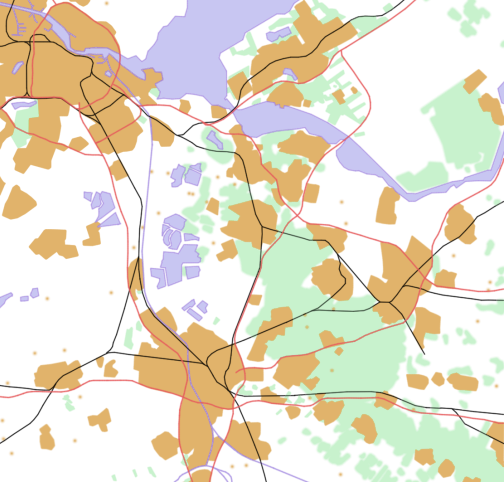
- Location within Northeastern Randstad

Almere Poort is a railway station in Almere, Netherlands. It is located on the Flevolijn. It replaced Almere Strand railway station as the city's sixth railway station.

The opening of the station was initially planned to occur on 2007 but was delayed until 9 December 2012. The station serves the new borough Almere Poort, which is also under development since 2007 and will have 11,000 dwellings when it is finished.

== Train services ==
As of 11 December 2016, the following train services call at this station:

- Local Sprinter services Hoofddorp - Schiphol Airport - Amsterdam Zuid - Almere Oostvaarders
- Local Sprinter services The Hague - Schiphol Airport - Amsterdam - Weesp - Almere - Lelystad - Zwolle
- Local Sprinter services Utrecht - Hilversum - Almere

== Bus services ==
- 2 (Station Poort - Gooisekant - Topsporthal - Stedenwijk - Almere Centrum)
- 4 (Station Poort - Homeruskwartier - Literatuurwijk - Muziekwijk - Almere Centrum)
- 10 (Station Poort - Gooisekant - Busstation 't Oor - Danswijk - Almere Buiten - Oostvaardersdiep)
- 14 (Station Poort - Literatuurwijk - Muziekwijk - Almere Centrum)
- 153 (Amsterdam Holendrecht/AMC - Bijlmer ArenA - Muiden P&R - Almere Poort - Literatuurwijk - Kruidenwijk - Waterwijk - Almere Buiten)
- 322 (Amsterdam Amstel - Muiden P&R - Almere Poort - Gooisekant - Almere Parkwijk)
