= Almere Buiten railway station =

Railway station in Almere, Netherlands

Almere Buiten
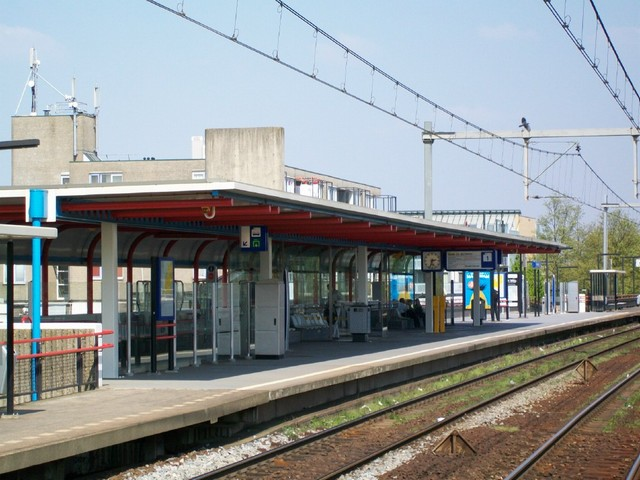

General information
- Location: Netherlands
- Coordinates: 52°23′39″N 5°16′40″E
- Line: Weesp–Lelystad railway

Other information
- Station code: Almb

History
- Opened: 30 May 1987; 39 years ago

Services
Preceding station	NS International	Following station
Almere Centrum towards Brussels-South	Eurocity Direct 9500 Mon-Sat before 20:00	Lelystad Centrum Terminus
Preceding station	Nederlandse Spoorwegen	Following station
Almere Centrum towards Rotterdam Centraal	NS Intercity Direct 2400 Mon-Sat until 20:00	Lelystad Centrum Terminus
Almere Parkwijk towards Den Haag Centraal	NS Sprinter 4300	Almere Oostvaarders towards Lelystad Centrum
Almere Parkwijk towards Amsterdam Centraal	NS Sprinter 4600 until 20:00	Almere Oostvaarders Terminus
Location
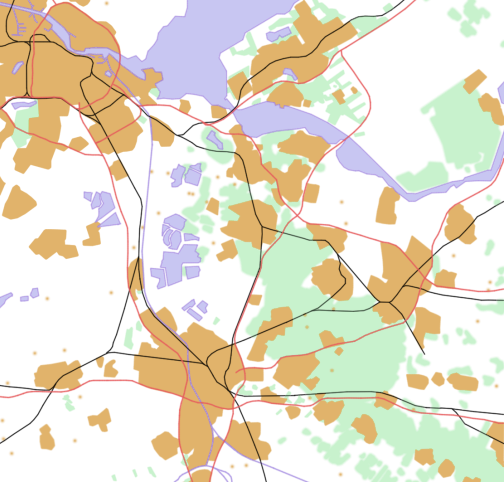
- Location within Northeastern Randstad

Almere Buiten is a railway station in Almere, Netherlands. It is located approximately 27 km (17 mi) east of Amsterdam. The station is located on the Weesp–Lelystad railway, connecting Weesp and Lelystad Centrum. The station was opened in 1987 when the line Weesp - Lelystad Centrum was built. In 1987 Almere Centrum and Almere Muziekwijk stations also opened before the Almere Buiten - Lelystad section was completed in 1988.

Almere has become a commuter city for Amsterdam. On 7 July 2008, there were 184,405 people living in Almere. The station is located in the centre of 'Almere Buiten' which translates as Outside Almere.

== Train services ==
As of 15 December 2024, the following train services call at this station:

- Eurocity Direct services Brussel-Zuid - Antwerpen - Rotterdam - Schiphol Airport - Amsterdam Zuid - Almere - Lelystad
- Intercity Direct services Rotterdam - Schiphol Airport - Amsterdam Zuid - Almere - Lelystad
- Local Sprinter services The Hague - Hoofddorp - Schiphol Airport - Amsterdam Zuid - Weesp - Almere - Lelystad
- Local Sprinter services Amsterdam Centraal - Weesp - Almere Oostvaarders

== Bus services ==
- 1 - Striphelden - Oostvaarders - Regenboogbuurt - Station Buiten - Bouwmeesterbuurt - Waterwijk - Almere Centrum - Stedenwijk - 't Oor Bus Station - Almere Haven
- 5 - Muziekwijk - Kruidenwijk - Almere Centrum - Parkwijk - Landgoederenbuurt - Station Buiten - Oostvaarders
- 10 - Station Poort - Gooisekant - Busstation 't Oor - Danswijk - Almere Buiten - Oostvaardersdiep
- 153 - Holendrecht - Bijlmer ArenA - Bijlmermeer - Muiden P&R - Almere Poort - Almere Muziekwijk - Almere Buiten
- 216 - Almere Buiten - Almere Stad - Muiden - Amstelveen - Schiphol-Oost
- N11 - Station Centrum → Molenbuurt → Station Buiten → Station Oostvaarders → Station Parkwijk → Danswijk → Sallandsekant → Danswijk → Filmwijk → Station Centrum
- N12 - Station Centrum → Filmwijk → Danswijk → Sallandsekant → Danswijk → Station Parkwijk → Station Oostvaarders → Station Buiten → Molenbuurt → Station Centrum
