= Gooiboog =

Coordinates: 52°18′15″N 5°04′10″E

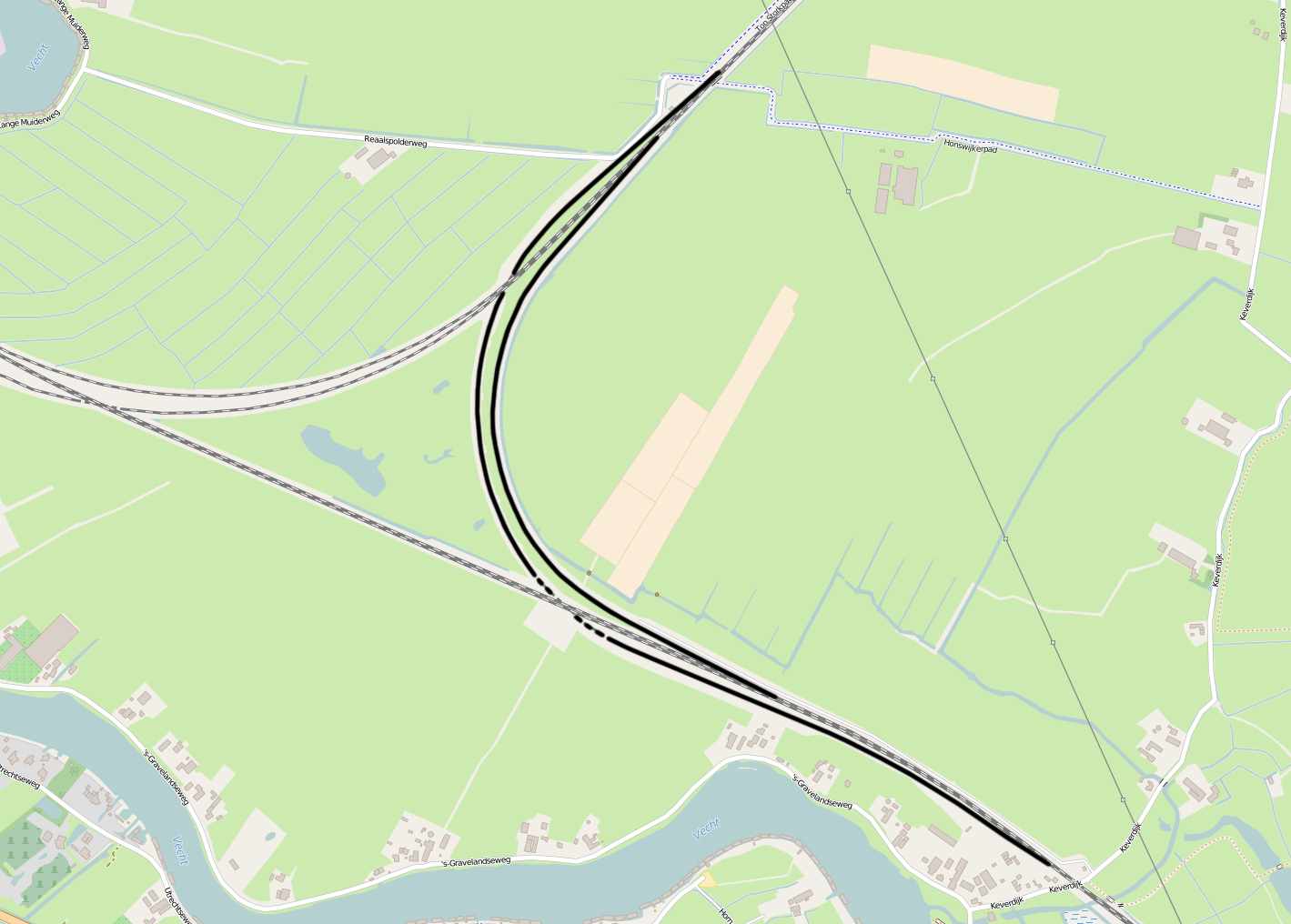
- Diagram showing the alignment of Gooiboog

History
- Commenced: 2000
- Opened: 14 December 2003

Technical
- Track length: 2,200 m (7,200 ft) (southbound); 1,400 m (4,600 ft) (northbound)
- Number of tracks: 2
- Track gauge: 1,435 mm (4 ft 8 1/2 in) standard gauge

The Gooiboog (Dutch for Gooi Curve) is a railway chord which links the Dutch Flevolijn and Gooilijn railway lines.

The link is double tracked. The outer, southbound line is 2200 metres long, the inner northbound one is 1400 metre. The outer track is in a dive-under, running beneath the surface level for about 1500 metres, diving underneath the Gooilijn.

The Gooiboog offers a direct link between Almere, Hilversum and Utrecht.

== History ==
In 1980 work began on the construction of the Flevolijn and in 1987 the line opened as far as Almere Buiten. In 1988 the line was extended to Lelystad. As early as 1987 the possibility of a link to Hilversum, Utrecht and Amersfoort was discussed. At present there is still no link between Almere and Amersfoort.

At first it was planned to build a fly-over but residents of Weesp complained it would ruin their view of the Naardermeer.

Construction started in 2000, with the first services running on 14 December 2003.
