= Weesp railway station =

Railway station in the Netherlands

Weesp
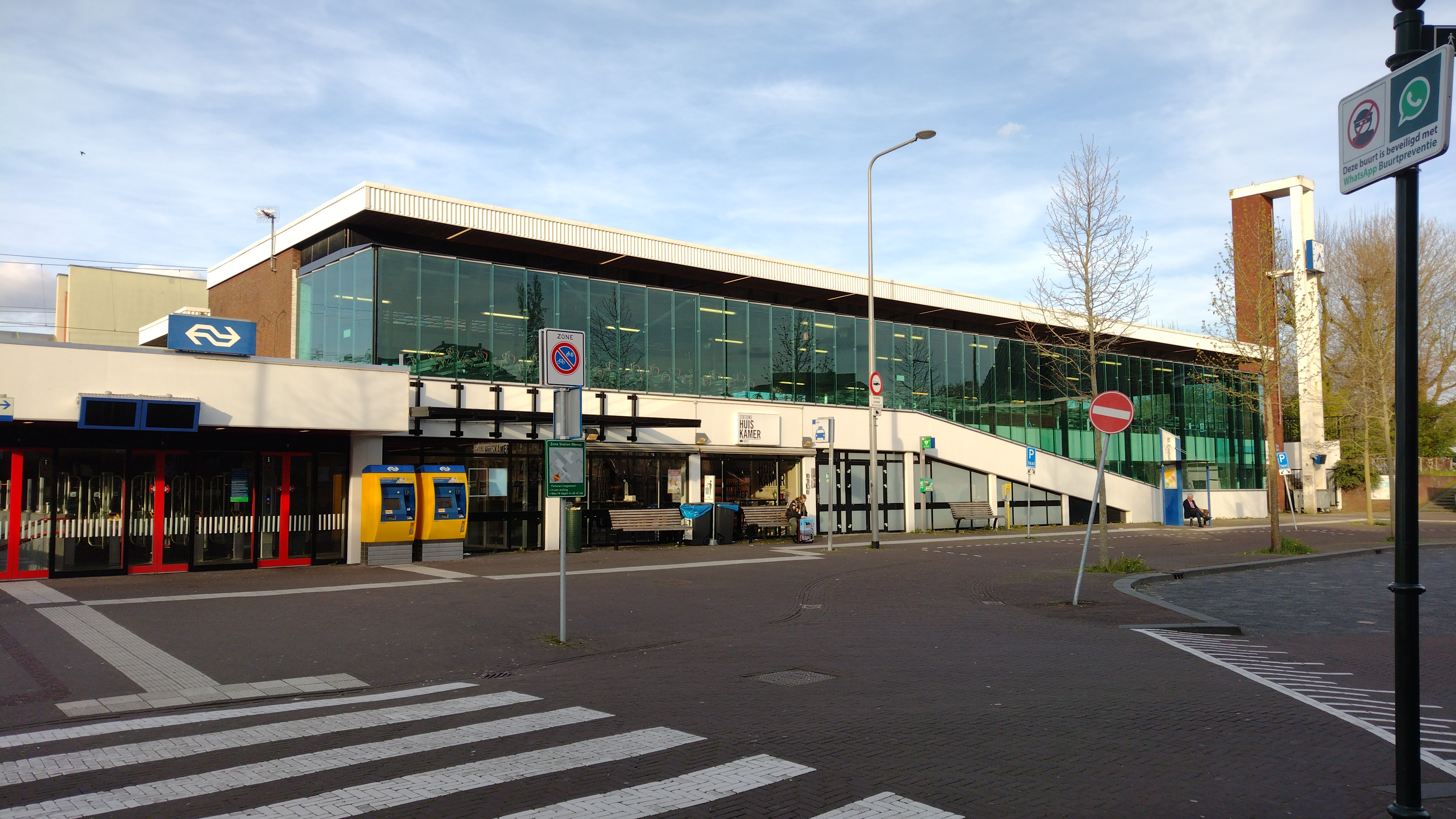
- The railway station in 2023

General information
- Location: Netherlands
- Coordinates: 52°18′47″N 5°2′37″E
- Operator: Nederlandse Spoorwegen
- Lines: Amsterdam–Zutphen railway Weesp–Lelystad railway Weesp–Leiden railway
- Platforms: 4

Other information
- Station code: Wp

History
- Opened: 10 June 1874; 152 years ago

Services
Preceding station	Nederlandse Spoorwegen	Following station
Diemen Zuid towards Den Haag Centraal	NS Sprinter 4300	Almere Poort towards Lelystad Centrum
Diemen towards Amsterdam Centraal	NS Sprinter 4600 until 20:00	Almere Poort towards Almere Oostvaarders
Diemen Zuid towards Leiden Centraal	NS Sprinter 5700 until 20:30	Naarden-Bussum towards Utrecht Centraal
Diemen towards Amsterdam Centraal	NS Sprinter 5800	Naarden-Bussum towards Amersfoort Vathorst
Location
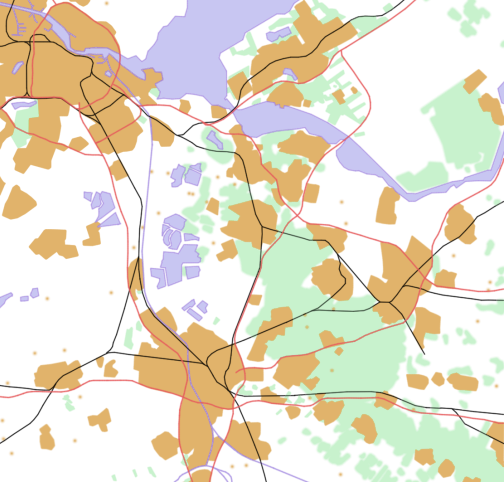
- Location within Northeastern Randstad

Weesp station is a railway station in Weesp, Netherlands. The station has two island platforms and a total of six tracks, two of which are used for passing trains. The Schiphollijn, Flevolijn and Gooilijn meet at Weesp making it an important transfer station for passengers going between Amsterdam, Hilversum and Almere. The first station in Weesp opened on 10 June 1874, when the Gooilijn from Amsterdam to Hilversum and Amersfoort was completed. The original station was demolished in 1967 and replaced by a new building. The new building partially went out of service in 1985 because of the new railway line from Weesp to Almere and beyond, called the Flevolijn. The out-of-service part was later converted to a bicycle parking and repair shop. The remaining station is little more than a tunnel passing under the tracks, and a small coffee counter. Train services are operated by Nederlandse Spoorwegen.

Since the opening of the Flevolijn, Weesp has been a major transfer station for passengers travelling from Amsterdam Central Station and Schiphol from the east, and suburbs such as Almere and Hilversum to the west. Due to this circumstance, Weesp features 16 departures per hour. Until 2003, also passagers travelling between Hilversum and Almere had to change at Weesp. In that year a new branch, the Gooiboog, was added to connect the line towards Almere with the line towards Naarden-Bussum railway station and Hilversum.

The traveling time from Weesp to Amsterdam Centraal by train is about 15 minutes. The distance between the two is about 15 kilometers.

== Train services ==
The following train services call at Weesp:

Route	Service type	Notes
Hoofddorp – Schiphol Airport – Duivendrecht – Almere Oostvaarders	Local ("Sprinter")	2x per hour
Amsterdam – Almere – Lelystad – Zwolle	Local ("Sprinter")	2x per hour
The Hague – Leiden – Hoofddorp – Schiphol Airport – Duivendrecht – Hilversum – Utrecht	Local ("Sprinter")	2x per hour
Hoofddorp – Schiphol Airport – Amsterdam – Hilversum – Amersfoort Vathorst	Local ("Sprinter")	2x per hour

== Bus services ==
Line	Route	Operator	Notes
49	Amsterdam Bijlmer ArenA Station – Amsterdam Kraaiennest – Amsterdam Gaasperplas – Driemond – Weesp Station	GVB	Mon-Fri on daytime hours only.
106	Hilversum – Kortenhoef – Nederhorst den Nerg – Weesp	Connexxion	Mon-Sat only. Only runs between Nederhorst den Berg and Weesp on evenings and Saturdays.
110	Bussum – Naarden – Naarderbos – Muiderberg – Muiden – Weesp	Connexxion	
210	Bussum – Naarden – Naarderbos – Muiderberg – Muiden – Weesp	Connexxion	Rush hours only.
522	Weesp – Nigtevecht – Loenen aan de Vecht – Vreeland	Syntus Utrecht	Mon-Sat during daytime hours only.
