= Amsterdamse Poort =

Amsterdamse Poort may refer to:

- Amsterdam Gate, Jakarta, a gate in Jakarta, Indonesia
- Amsterdamse Poort, Haarlem, a city gate of Haarlem, the Netherlands
- Amsterdamse Poort (shopping centre)
