= Almere Centrum railway station =

Railway station in the Netherlands

Almere Centrum
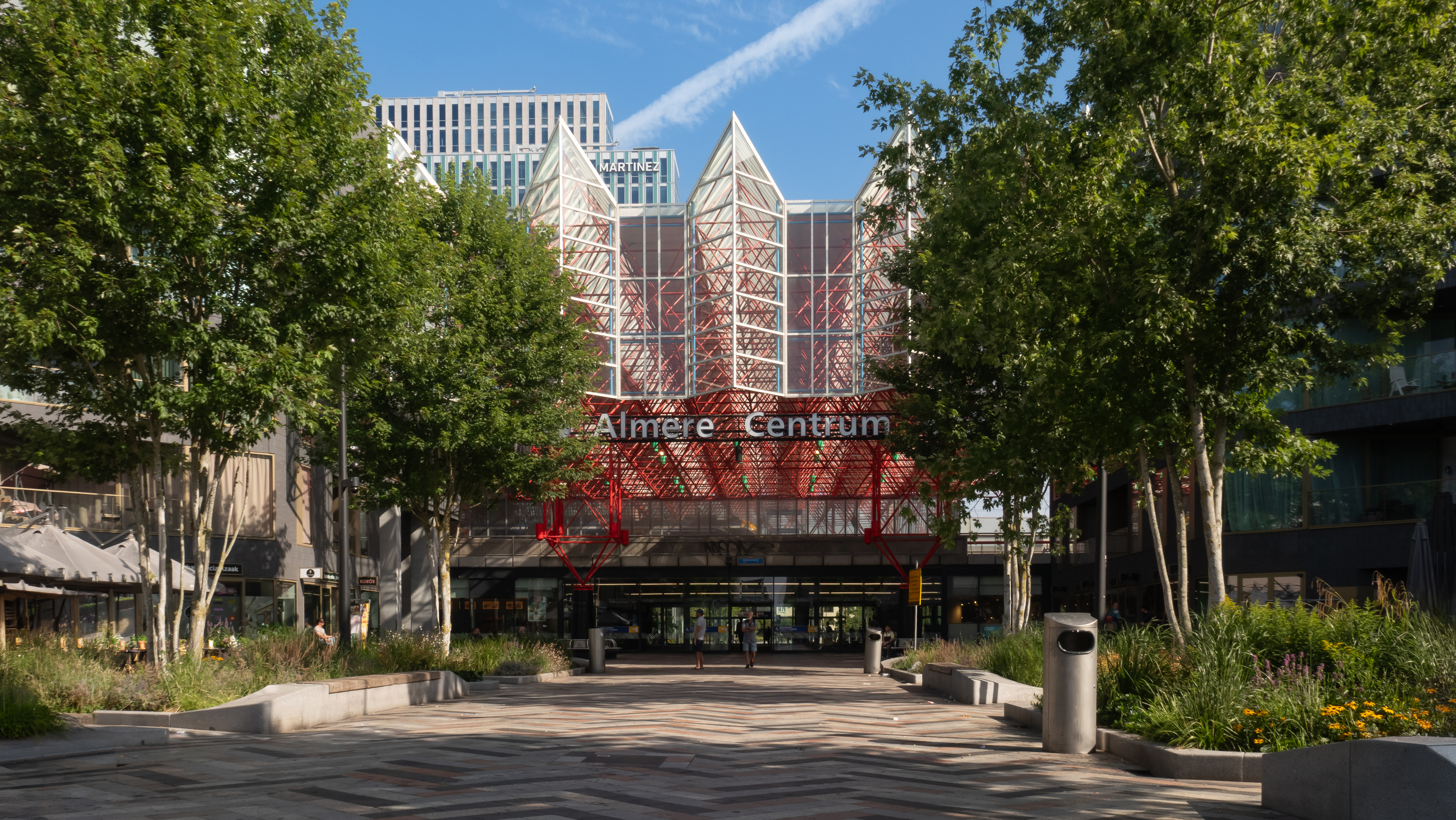

General information
- Location: Netherlands
- Coordinates: 52°22′30″N 5°13′4″E
- Line: Weesp–Lelystad railway
- Connections: Keolis Nederland: M1, M2, M3, M4, M5, M6, M7, 326, N21, N22, N23; OV Regio IJsselmond: 159, 160

Other information
- Station code: Alm

History
- Opened: 30 May 1987; 39 years ago
Services
Preceding station	NS International	Following station
Duivendrecht towards Brussels-South	Eurocity Direct 9500 Mon-Sat before 20:00	Almere Buiten towards Lelystad Centrum
Preceding station	Nederlandse Spoorwegen	Following station
Amsterdam Zuid towards Schiphol Airport	NS Intercity 700	Lelystad Centrum towards Groningen
Amsterdam Zuid towards Schiphol Airport	NS Intercity 800	Lelystad Centrum towards Leeuwarden
Duivendrecht towards Rotterdam Centraal	NS Intercity Direct 2400 Mon-Sat until 20:00	Almere Buiten towards Lelystad Centrum
Amsterdam Centraal Terminus	NS Intercity 2600	Terminus
Almere Muziekwijk towards Den Haag Centraal	NS Sprinter 4300	Almere Parkwijk towards Lelystad Centrum
Almere Muziekwijk towards Amsterdam Centraal	NS Sprinter 4600 until 20:00	Almere Parkwijk towards Almere Oostvaarders
Almere Muziekwijk towards Utrecht Centraal	NS Sprinter 4900	Terminus
Preceding station	Arriva Netherlands	Following station
Amsterdam Centraal towards Schiphol Airport	Nachttrein 32780 Friday night only	Lelystad Centrum towards Groningen
Location
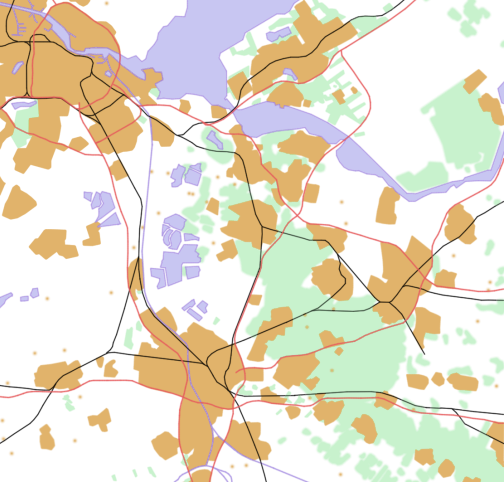
- Location within Northeastern Randstad

Almere Centrum is a railway station in Almere, Netherlands. It is located approximately 22 kilometres east of Amsterdam. The station lies on the Weesp–Lelystad railway. Almere Centrum is located in central Almere: a new town established in 1976 on land reclaimed from the sea (cf. Flevoland). Almere Centrum has two platforms and four tracks, and was opened in 1987 following the completion of the Flevolijn between Weesp railway station and Lelystad Centrum. The station's original name was Almere Central Station (CS), but it was renamed in 1999 to Almere Centrum.

The station building has a glass roof, and the tracks and platforms are elevated above street level. Almere Centrum bus station is located beneath the railway station.

== Train services ==
Train	Operator	From	Via	To	Freq.	Service
InterCity; 700	NS	Den Haag Centraal	Schiphol Airport – Amsterdam Zuid – Almere Centrum – Lelystad Centrum – Zwolle	Groningen	2/hour	
InterCity; 1800	NS	Den Haag Centraal	Schiphol Airport – Amsterdam Zuid – Almere Centrum – Lelystad Centrum – Zwolle – Meppel	Leeuwarden	2/hour	
InterCity; 2400	NS	Lelystad Centrum	Almere Centrum – Amsterdam Zuid – Schiphol Airport – Leiden Centraal – Den Haag HS – Delft – Schiedam Centrum – Rotterdam Centraal	Doordrecht	2/hour	No service after 10:00pm; Train 2421 does not stop at Amsterdam Zuid
InterCity; 2600	NS	Amsterdam Centraal	N/A	Almere Centrum	2/hour	
Sprinter; 4300	NS	Hoofdorp	Schiphol Airport – Amsterdam Zuid – Weesp – Almere Centrum	Almere Oostvarders	2/hour	
Sprinter; 4900	NS	Utrecht Centraal	Hilversum	Almere Centrum	2/hour	1/hour on Sundays; 1(4900) service in the evenings does not stop at Bussum Zuid and Hilversum Media Park

== Bus services ==
These services are operated by Keolis Nederland.

- M1 Almere Centrum - Stedenwijk - 't Oor Bus Station - Almere Haven
- M2 Almere Centrum - Waterwijk - Bouwmeesterbuurt - Molenbuurt - Station Buiten- Seizoenenbuurt - Oostvaarders - Striphelden
- M3 Almere Centrum - Kruidenwijk - Muziekwijk
- M4 Almere Centrum - Stedenwijk - Muziekwijk - Literatuurwijk - Homeruskwartier - Almere Poort
- M5 Almere Centrum - Filmwijk - Danswijk - Parkwijk - Verzetswijk - Tussen de Vaarten
- M6 Almere Centrum - Kruidenwijk - Noorderplassen
- 326 Almere Centrum - Stedenwijk - 't Oor Bus Station - Almere Hout - Blaricum

These services are operated by OV Regio IJsselmond.

- 159 Almere Centrum - Filmwijk - Zeewolde - Harderwijk
- 160 Almere Centrum - Stedenwijk - 't Oor Bus Station - Zeewolde

This service is operated by Flixbus.

- Almere Centrum - Vianen - Kaatsheuvel (Efteling) - Tilburg - Brussels

=== Night buses ===
Bus Service	Operator	From	To	Via	Notes
N21	Keolis	Leidseplein Amsterdam	Station Almere Buiten	Amsterdam, Amstelstation, Middenweg, Kruislaan, Brinkstraat, Muiden, P en R terrein, Almere Stad, Busstation 't Oor, Kasteel, Veluwsekant, Filmwijk, Station Centrum, Staatsliedenwijk, Markerkant, Waterwijk, Almere Buiten, Bouwmeesterbuurt, Molenbuurt	Loop line
N22	Keolis	Leidseplein Amsterdam	Sieradenbuurt Almere Buiten	Amsterdam, Amstelstation, Middenweg, Kruislaan, Brinkstraat, Muiden, P en R terrein, Almere Poort, Homeruskwartier, Literatuurwijk, Muziekwijk, Kruidenwijk, Station Centrum, Parkwijk Zuid, Danswijk, Tussen de Vaarten, Faunabuurt, Station Almere Buiten, Regenboogbuurt, Station Almere Oostvaarders	Loop line
N23	Keolis	Leidseplein Amsterdam	Station Almere Centrum	Amsterdam, Amstelstation, Middenweg, Kruislaan, Brinkstraat, Muiden, P en R terrein, Busstation 't Oor, Almere Haven, Busstation t' Oor, Almere Stad, Stedenwijk	Loop line

== Gallery ==
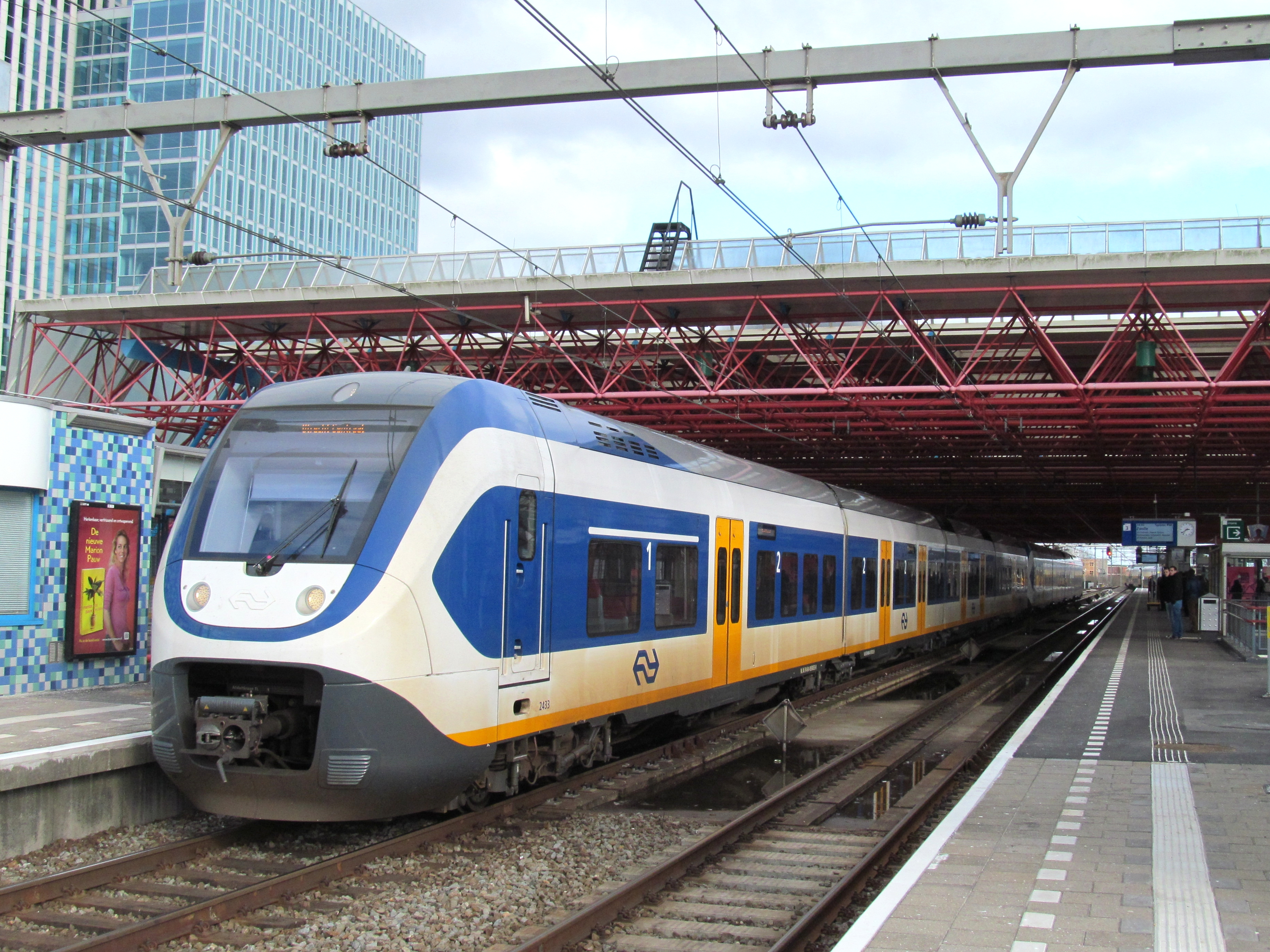
A Sprinter Light Train bound for Utrecht

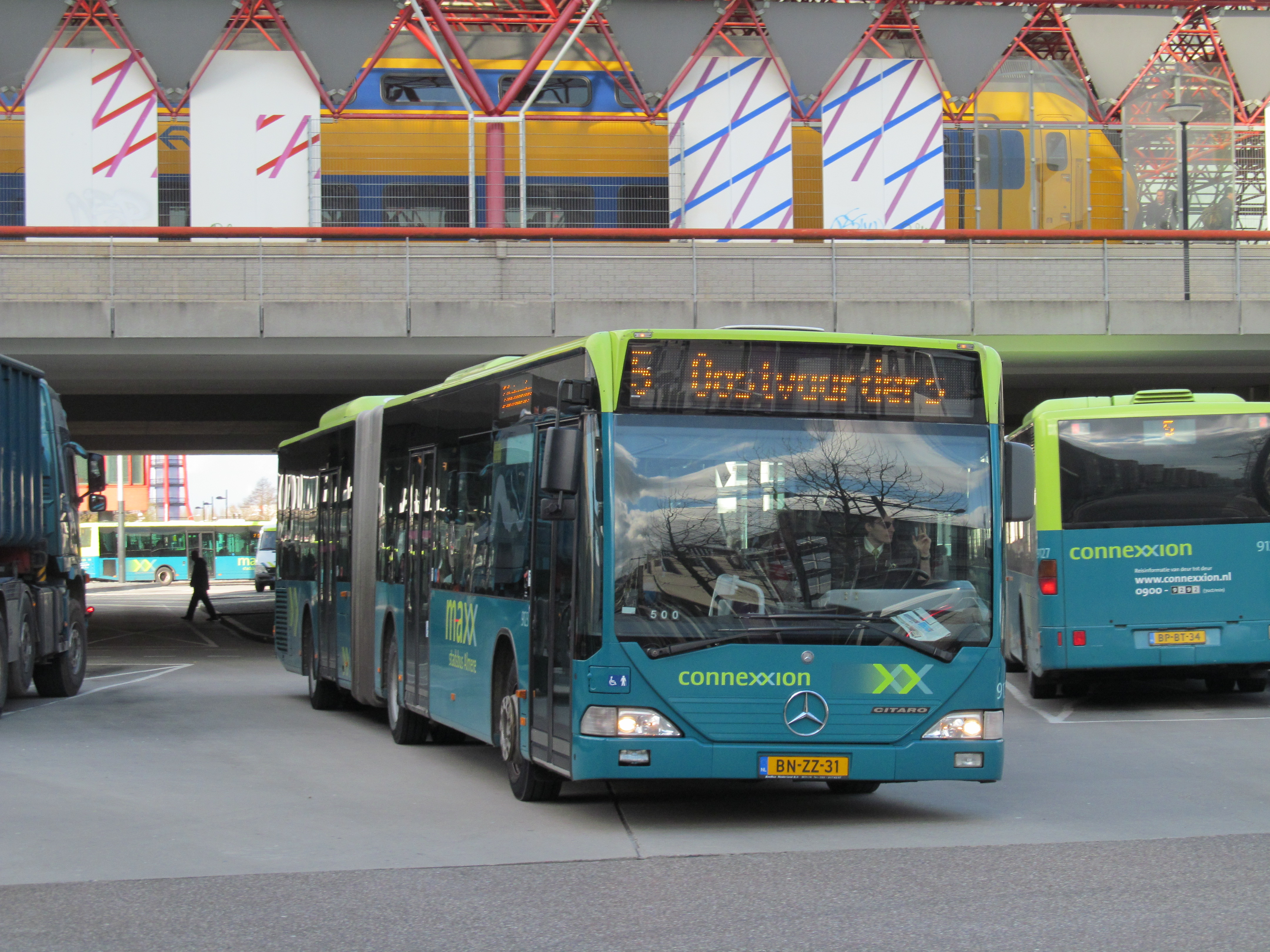
Bus leaving the bus station.

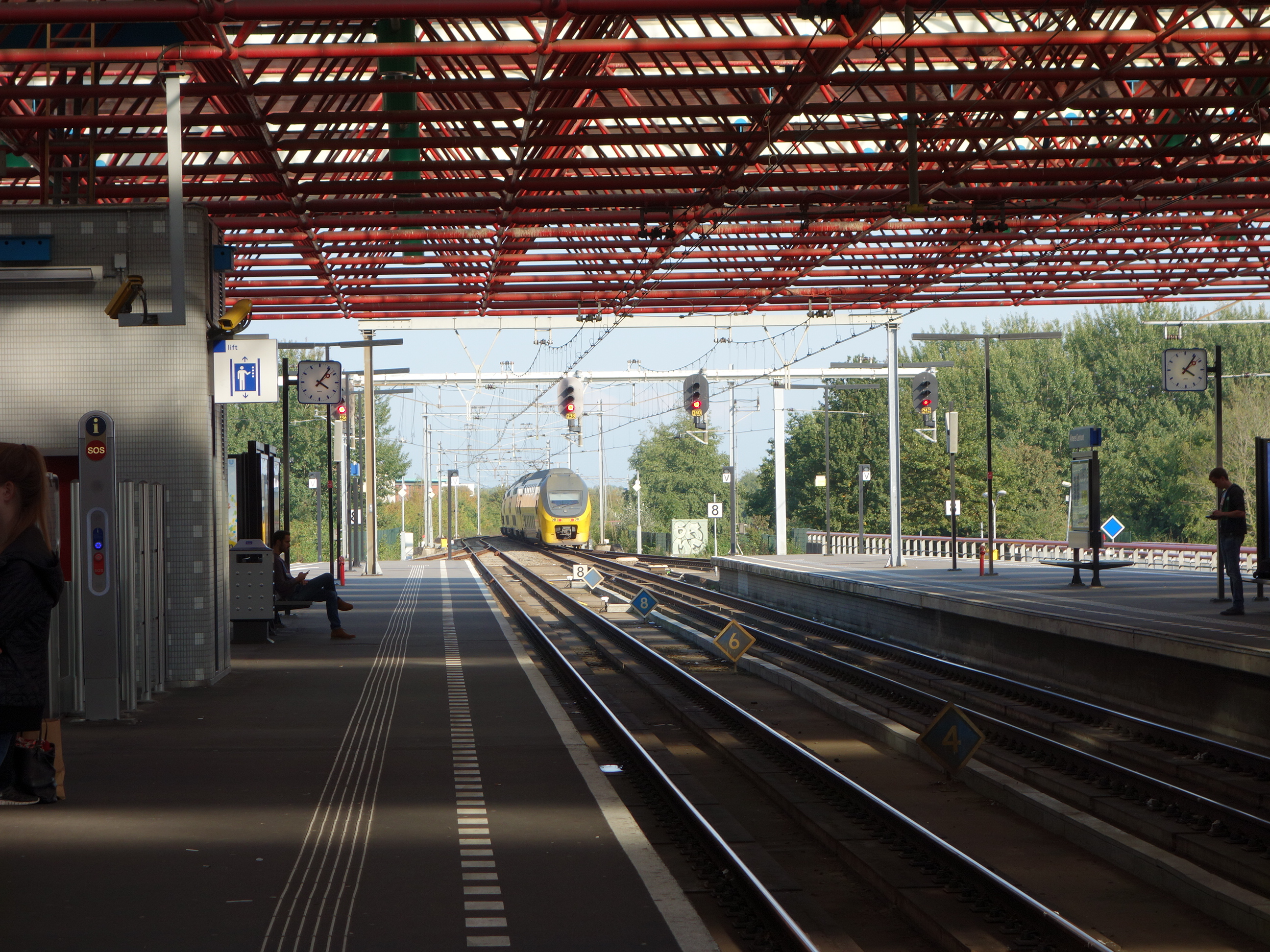
Inside of the station with tracks.

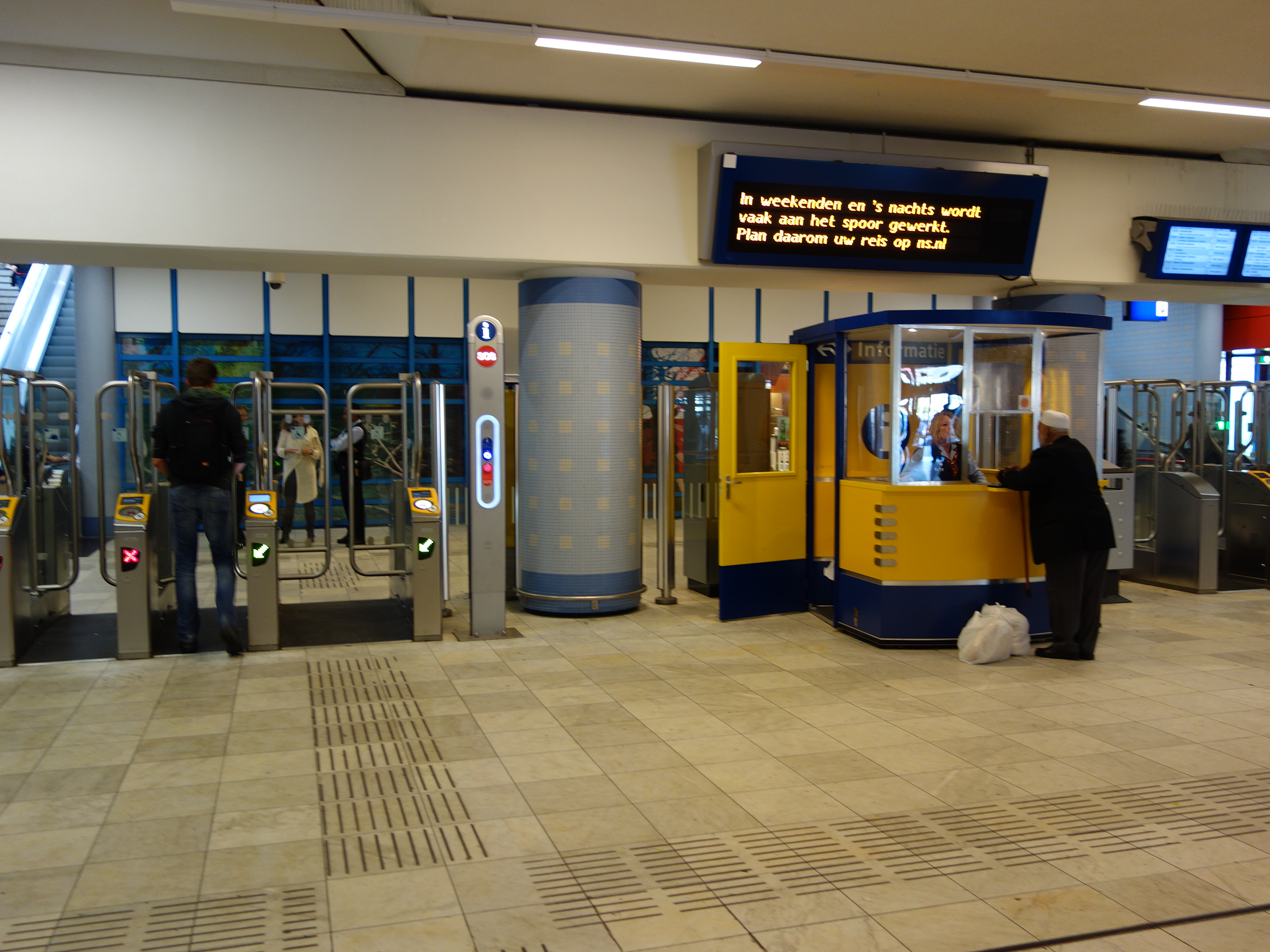
Inside, ticket concourse.
