= Weesp–Lelystad railway =

Railway in the Netherlands

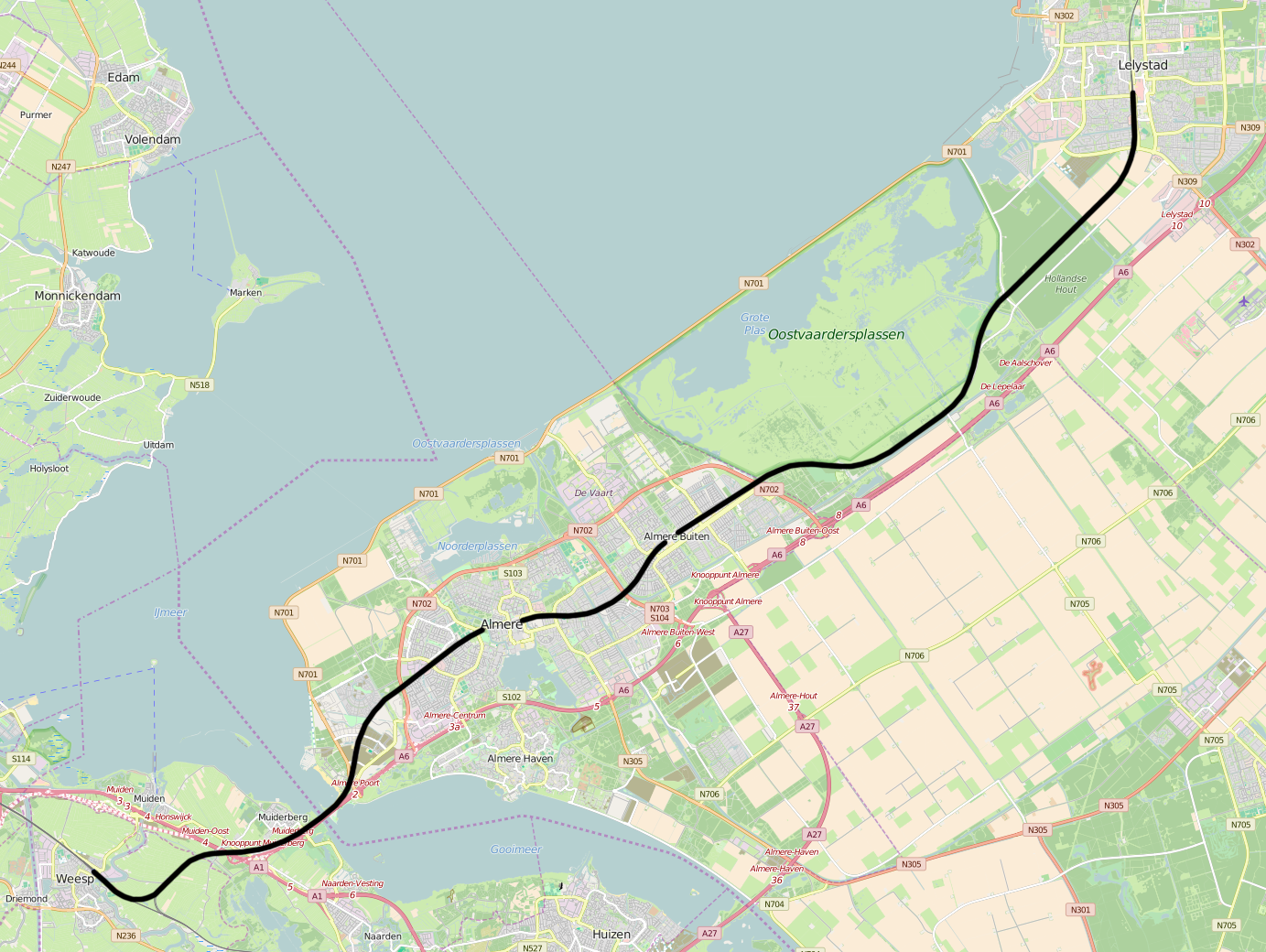
Map of the Weesp–Lelystad railway

The Weesp–Lelystad railway, also known as Flevolijn, is a railway in the Netherlands operated by Nederlandse Spoorwegen and owned by ProRail. The line runs from Weesp, North Holland to Lelystad, capital of the neighbouring province of Flevoland. It currently has seven stations, these are (southwest to northeast): Almere Poort, Almere Muziekwijk, Almere Centrum, Almere Parkwijk, Almere Buiten, Almere Oostvaarders and Lelystad Centrum. Almere Strand was closed in 2012 and Lelystad Zuid is due to open before 2025.

== Timeline ==
- 1987: the line opens between Weesp and Almere Buiten. The station Almere Parkwijk had not been built at the time.
- 1988: the line was finished when it was extended to Lelystad Centrum.
- 1996: Almere Parkwijk station opens.
- 2003: the Gooiboog curve opens, allowing direct trains to Hilversum and Utrecht.
- 2004: Almere Oostvaarders station opens.
- 2012: Almere Poort station opens, as well as the Hanzelijn (Lelystad to Zwolle).
- 2025: Planned opening of Lelystad Zuid station.

== History ==
Work began on the railway line in 1980. Originally, it was planned to run straight through the Oostvaardersplassen. After protests from environmentalists, the transport minister decided that the line was to pass outside this nature area. As a consequence, this detour is, because of its form, now colloquially called the bath tub line.

In 2008, it was announced that the line's capacity will be extended to 12 trains per hour in either direction. To achieve this, it will be doubled to four tracks.

== Hanzelijn ==
Work on the Hanzelijn from Lelystad Centrum to Zwolle began in 2007 and the line opened in 2012. Two new stations were opened, Dronten and Kampen Zuid.

The Lelystad Zuid station is expected to open in 2025.

== Train services ==
The current train services operating on the Flevolijn are:

Series:	Train Type:	Route:	Material:	Frequency:
3700	Intercity	Schiphol - Amsterdam Zuid - Duivendrecht - Almere Centrum - Almere Buiten - Lelystad Centrum	DD-AR	2x per hour
3900	Intercity	Hoofddorp - Schiphol - Amsterdam Lelylaan - Amsterdam Sloterdijk - Amsterdam Centraal - Almere Centrum - Almere Buiten - Lelystad Centrum	DD-AR	2x per hour
4300	Stoptrain	Hoofddorp – Schiphol – Amsterdam Zuid – Amsterdam RAI - Duivendrecht – Diemen Zuid - Weesp – Almere Muziekwijk - Almere Centrum – Almere Parkwijk - Almere Buiten - Almere Oostvaarders	SLT	2x per hour
4600	Stoptrain	Amsterdam Centraal - Amsterdam Muiderpoort - Diemen - Weesp - Almere Muziekwijk - Almere Centrum - Almere Parkwijk - Almere Buiten - Almere Oostvaarders	SLT	2x per hour
4900	Intercity	Almere Centrum - Almere Muziekwijk – Naarden-Bussum - Hilversum – Hilversum Sportpark - Utrecht Overvecht - Utrecht Centraal	DD-AR	2x per hour
