= Poort (surname) =

Poort (Dutch: port) is a Dutch surname that may refer to the following people:

- Henk Poort (born 1956), Dutch actor and singer
- Jarrod Poort (born 1994), Australian competition swimmer
- Joris Poort (born 1983), American businessman and entrepreneur
- Sjef Poort (1956–1998), Dutch voice actor
