= Lelystad Zuid railway station =

Railway station in the Netherlands

Lelystad Zuid
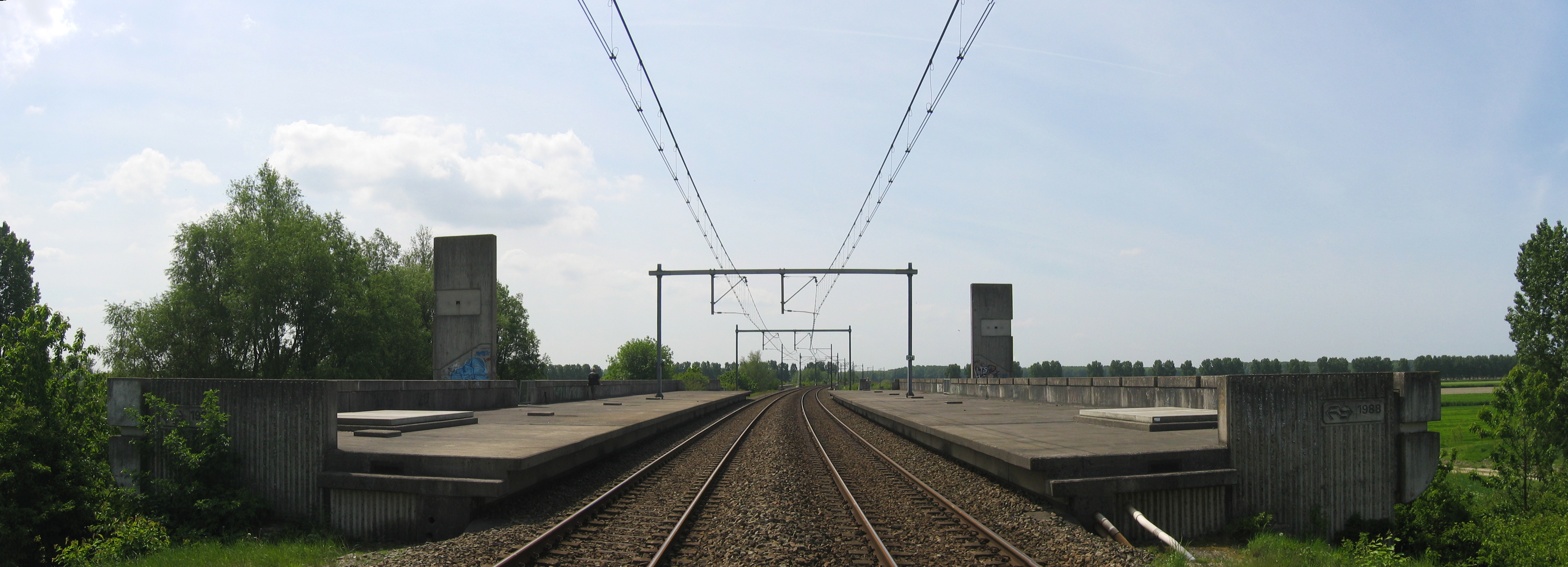

General information
- Location: Lelystad, Netherlands
- Coordinates: 52°29′11″N 5°28′5″E
Location
- Location within Netherlands

Lelystad Zuid is a railway station in the south of Lelystad, Flevoland, Netherlands. While constructed, the station is not planned to open before 2025.

The station is located in a currently unbuilt area of Lelystad. In 1988, this area was planned to be developed heavily for residential purposes, but demand for houses in Lelystad was not as big as previously thought and the planned neighbourhood of Warande was never built.

However, towards the end of 2008, construction at Warande started again and it was initially hoped that the construction will be completed between 2015 and 2020. In February 2011, Nederlandse Spoorwegen said it does not expect to use the station before 2025.
