= Almere Muziekwijk railway station =

Railway station in the Netherlands

Almere Muziekwijk (Music Quarter)
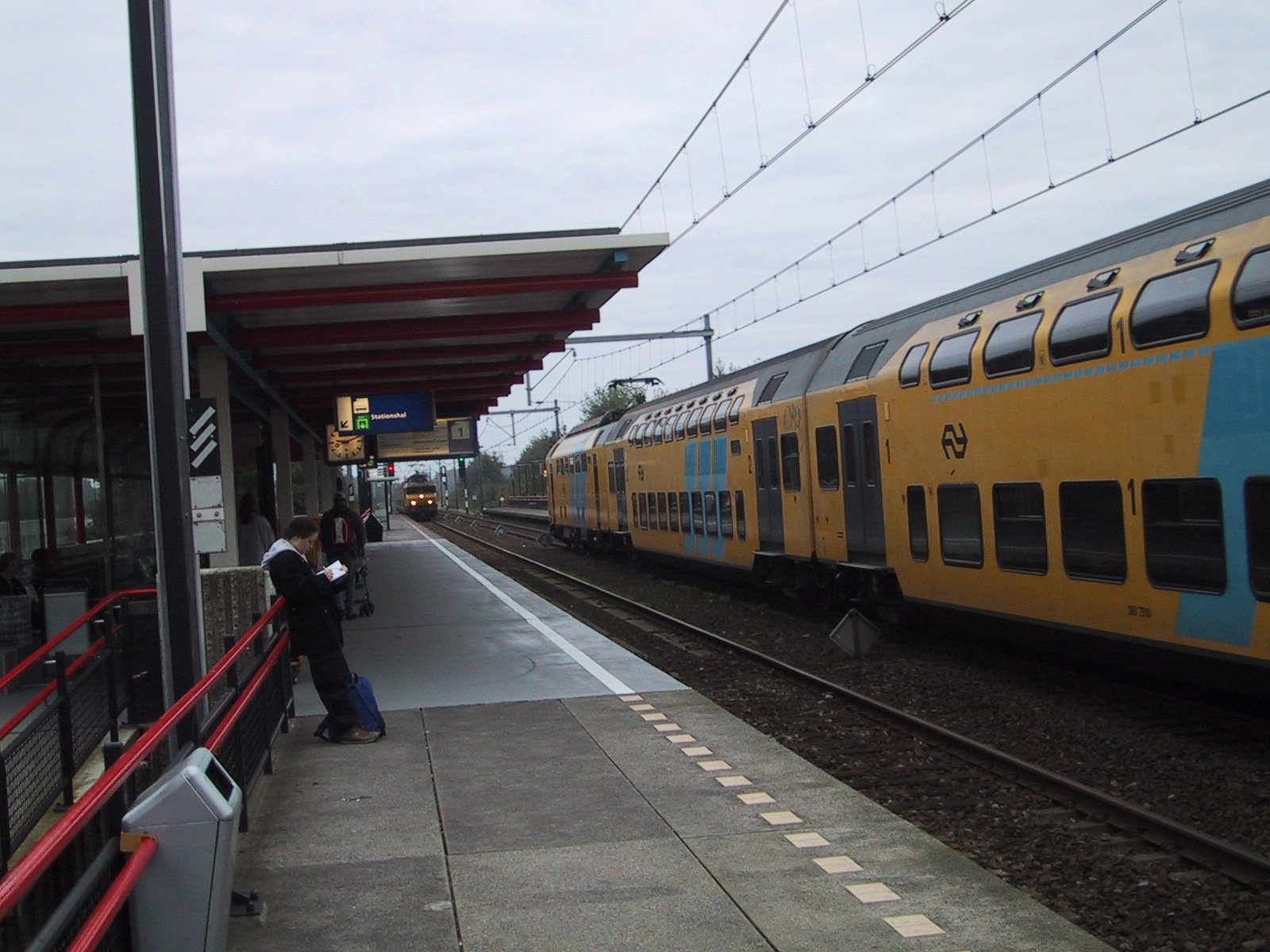

General information
- Location: Netherlands
- Coordinates: 52°22′3″N 5°11′25″E
- Line: Weesp–Lelystad railway

Other information
- Station code: Almm

History
- Opened: 30 May 1987

Services
Preceding station	Nederlandse Spoorwegen	Following station
Almere Poort towards Den Haag Centraal	NS Sprinter 4300	Almere Centrum towards Lelystad Centrum
Almere Poort towards Amsterdam Centraal	NS Sprinter 4600 until 20:00	Almere Centrum towards Almere Oostvaarders
Almere Poort towards Utrecht Centraal	NS Sprinter 4900	Almere Centrum Terminus
Location
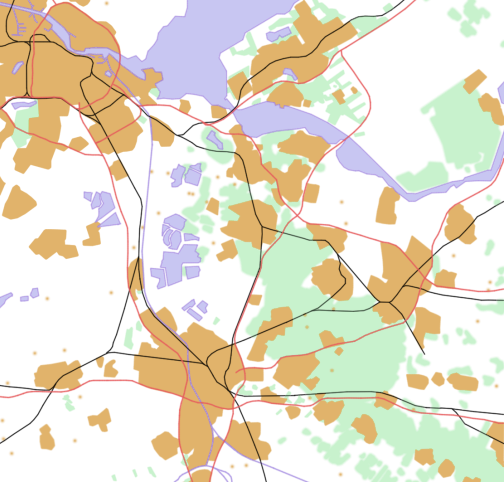
- Location within Northeastern Randstad

Almere Muziekwijk is a railway station in Almere, The Netherlands. It is located approximately 20 km east of Amsterdam. It is on the Weesp–Lelystad railway. The station was opened in 1987 when the line Weesp - Lelystad Centrum was built. In 1987 Almere Centrum and Almere Buiten stations opened before the Almere Buiten - Lelystad section was completed in 1988.

Almere has become a commuter city for Amsterdam. On 7 July 2008, there were 184,405 people living in Almere.

== Train services ==
As of 11 December 2016, the following train services call at this station:

- Local Sprinter services Hoofddorp - Schiphol Airport - Amsterdam Zuid - Almere Oostvaarders
- Local Sprinter services The Hague - Schiphol Airport - Amsterdam - Weesp - Almere - Lelystad - Zwolle
- Local Sprinter services Utrecht - Hilversum - Almere

== Bus services ==
- 4 - Almere Centrum - Muziekwijk - Literatuurwijk - Homerus - Almere Poort
- 7 - Sallandsekant - Tussen de Vaarten - Station Parkwijk - Filmwijk - Station Centrum - Muziekwijk Noord - Station Muziekwijk
- 14 - Almere Centrum - Muziekwijk - Literatuurwijk - Almere Poort
- 215 - Almere Buiten - Almere Stad - Muiden - Amstelveen - Schiphol Oost
- N13 - Station Centrum → 't Oor → Haven → 't Oor → Gooisekant → Station Muziekwijk → Muziekwijk Noord → Station Centrum
