= Almere Oostvaarders railway station =

Commuter railway station in Almere, Netherlands, about 30km east of Amsterdam

Almere Oostvaarders
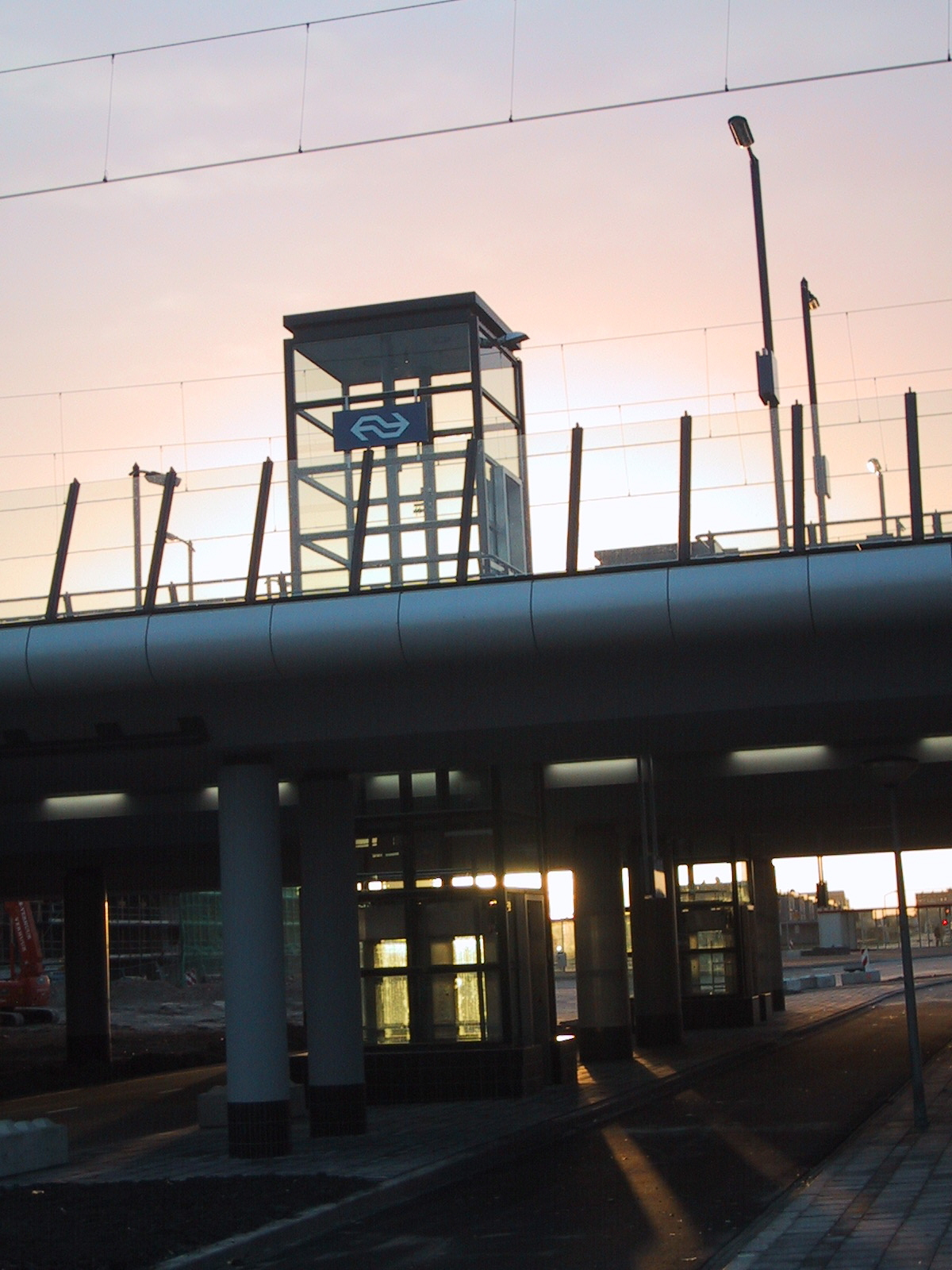

General information
- Location: Netherlands
- Coordinates: 52°24′10″N 5°18′0″E
- Line: Weesp–Lelystad railway

History
- Opened: 12 December 2004; 21 years ago

Services
Preceding station	Nederlandse Spoorwegen	Following station
Almere Buiten towards Den Haag Centraal	NS Sprinter 4300	Lelystad Centrum Terminus
Almere Buiten towards Amsterdam Centraal	NS Sprinter 4600 until 20:00	Terminus
Location
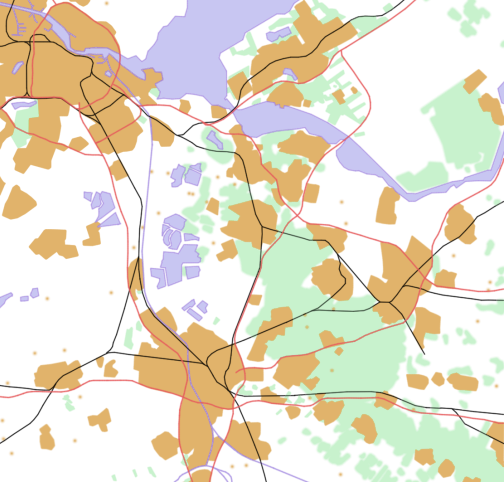
- Location within Northeastern Randstad

Almere Oostvaarders is a railway station in Almere, Netherlands. It is located 29 km (18.0 mi) east of Amsterdam, on the Amsterdam - Almere - Lelystad main line. It is approximately 3 km (1.9 mi) northeast of the Almere city centre. Almere Oostvaarders railway station opened on 12 December 2004.

Before the station was built the commuter train Amsterdam-Almere Oostvaarders terminated at Almere Buiten. The four tracks at Almere Oostvaarders were used by the driver walking through the train to start a service again at Almere Buiten.

The station is in the centre of the 'Oostvaarders' development, on the edge of Almere-Buiten. It is situated near the Oostvaarders nature reserve, the Oostvaardersplassen. The station is located on a viaduct with 4 tracks and has 4 platforms, which are island platforms.

When Almere Oostvaarders opened, a new curve was built, so trains could go from Almere to Hilversum and Utrecht without the necessary change of trains at Weesp. The curve is between the stations Almere Poort and Naarden-Bussum.

== Train services ==
As of 15 December 2024, the following train services call at this station:

- Local Sprinter 4300 services The Hague - Hoofddorp - Schiphol Airport - Amsterdam Zuid - Almere - Lelystad
- Local Sprinter 4600 services Amsterdam CS - Weesp - Almere Oostvaarders

== Bus services ==
- "Buitenmetro" M2. Stripheldenbuurt-Oost - Station Oostvaarders - Oostvaardersbuurt - Seizoenenbuurt - Station Buiten - Molenbuurt - Bouwmeesterbuurt - Waterwijk - Station Centrum
- "Parkmetro" M7. Station Oostvaarders - Eilandenbuurt - Regenboogbuurt - Station Buiten - Bloemenbuurt - Faunabuurt - Landgoederenbuurt - Verzetswijk - Station Parkwijk - Station Centrum
