= Lelystad Centrum railway station =

Railway station in the Netherlands

Lelystad Centrum
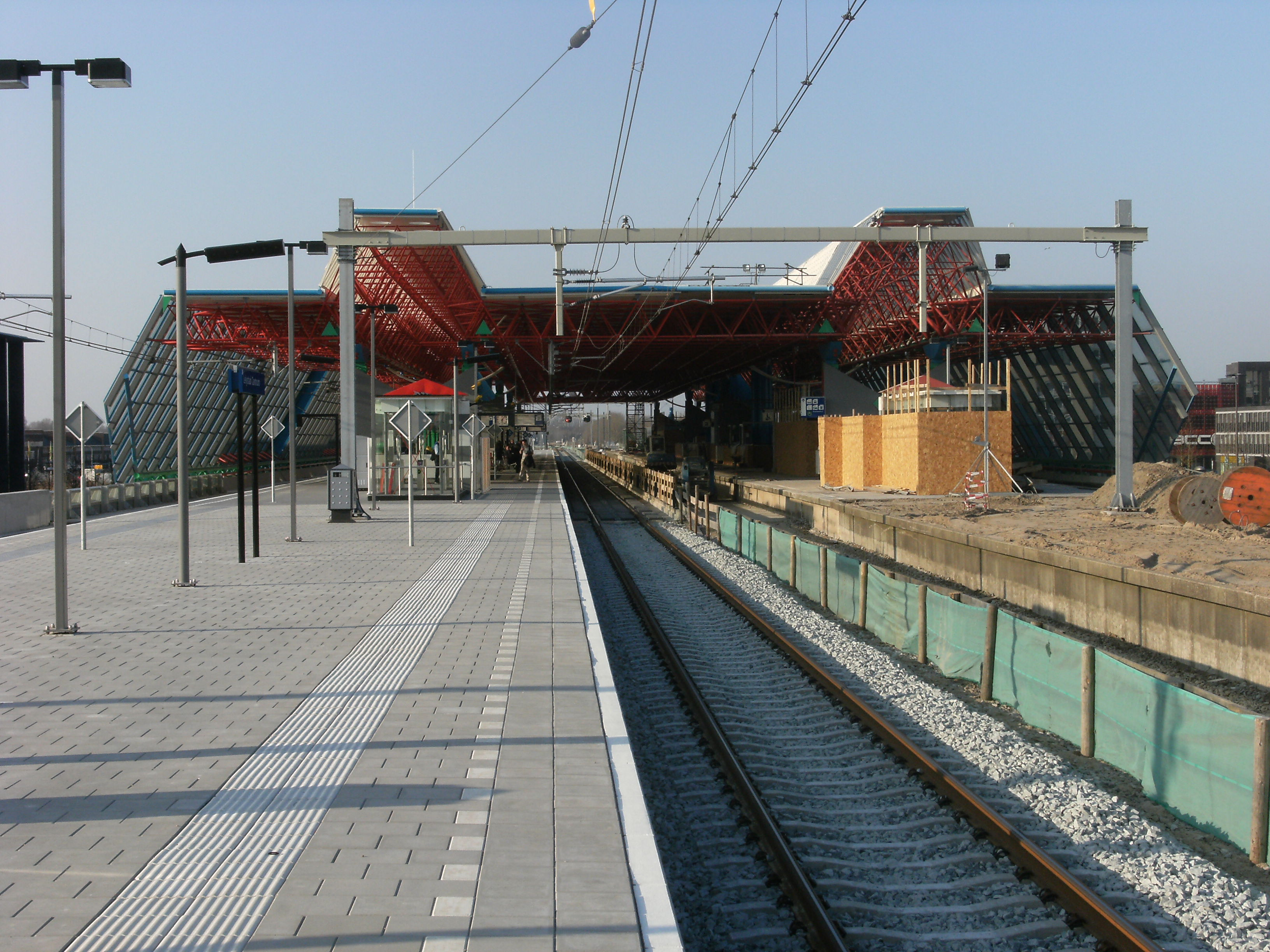

General information
- Location: Netherlands
- Coordinates: 52°30′28″N 5°28′24″E
- Lines: Weesp–Lelystad railway Lelystad-Zwolle railway
- Connections: EBS: 1, 2, 3, 4, 5, 6 , 7, 8, 9, 10, 11, 13, 16, 143, 147, 207, 214, 218; Connexxion: 650, 663

Other information
- Station code: Lls

History
- Opened: 28 May 1988; 38 years ago

Services
Preceding station	NS International	Following station
Almere Buiten towards Brussels-South	Eurocity Direct 9500 Mon-Sat before 20:00	Terminus
Preceding station	Nederlandse Spoorwegen	Following station
Almere Centrum towards Schiphol Airport	NS Intercity 700	Zwolle towards Groningen
Almere Centrum towards Schiphol Airport	NS Intercity 800	Zwolle towards Leeuwarden
Almere Buiten towards Rotterdam Centraal	NS Intercity Direct 2400 Mon-Sat until 20:00	Terminus
Almere Oostvaarders towards Den Haag Centraal	NS Sprinter 4300	Terminus
Terminus	NS Sprinter 9000	Dronten towards Leeuwarden
Preceding station	Arriva Netherlands	Following station
Almere Centrum towards Schiphol Airport	Nachttrein 32780 Friday night only	Zwolle towards Groningen
Location
- Location within Netherlands

Lelystad Centrum is a railway station in the town of Lelystad, Netherlands. The station is on the Flevolijn and Hanzelijn and the train services are operated by Nederlandse Spoorwegen. The station was opened on 28 May 1988 after the extension from Almere Buiten was completed. The station was doubled in size to 4 platforms to accommodate the increase in trains following the opening of the Hanzelijn on 9 December 2012.

== Train services ==
As of 15 December 2024, the following train services call at this station:

- Eurocity Direct services Brussel-Zuid - Antwerpen - Rotterdam - Schiphol Airport - Amsterdam Zuid - Almere - Lelystad
- Intercity Direct services Rotterdam - Schiphol Airport - Amsterdam Zuid - Almere - Lelystad
- Intercity services Schiphol Airport - Amsterdam Zuid - Almere - Lelystad - Zwolle - Groningen
- Intercity services Schiphol Airport - Amsterdam Zuid - Almere - Lelystad - Zwolle - Leeuwarden
- Intercity services Rotterdam - Schiphol Airport - Amsterdam Zuid - Almere - Lelystad
- Local Sprinter services The Hague - Schiphol Airport - Amsterdam Zuid - Weesp - Almere - Lelystad
- Local Sprinter services Lelystad - Zwolle - Meppel - Steenwijk - Heerenveen - Leeuwarden

== Bus services ==
=== Town services ===
- 1 Lelystad Harbour via Noordersluis
- 2 Kustwijk
- 3 Batavia Stad
- 4 Lelycentre via Zuiderzeewijk
- 5 Atolwijk via Lelycentre
- 6 Duinbeek via Waterwijk
- 7 Lelystad Airport
- 8 Hollandse Hout
- 9 Parkhaven
- 10 Bio Science Center
- 13 Batavia Stad via Kempenaar
- 11 Lelystad Harbour
- 16 Duinbeek via Boswijk

=== Regional services ===
- 214 Lelystad - Nagele - Emmeloord
- 218 Lelystad - Urk
- 207 Lelystad - Harderwijk
- 147 Lelystad - Dronten
- 143 Lelystad - Kampen
- 650 Lelystad - Markerwaarddijk - Enkhuizen - Bovenkarspel - Grootebroek - Andijk - Wervershoof
- 663 Lelystad - Dronten - Kampen

Both the 650 and 663 are once a day student services.

== Gallery ==
Lelystad Centrum in 2007, before the station was expanded

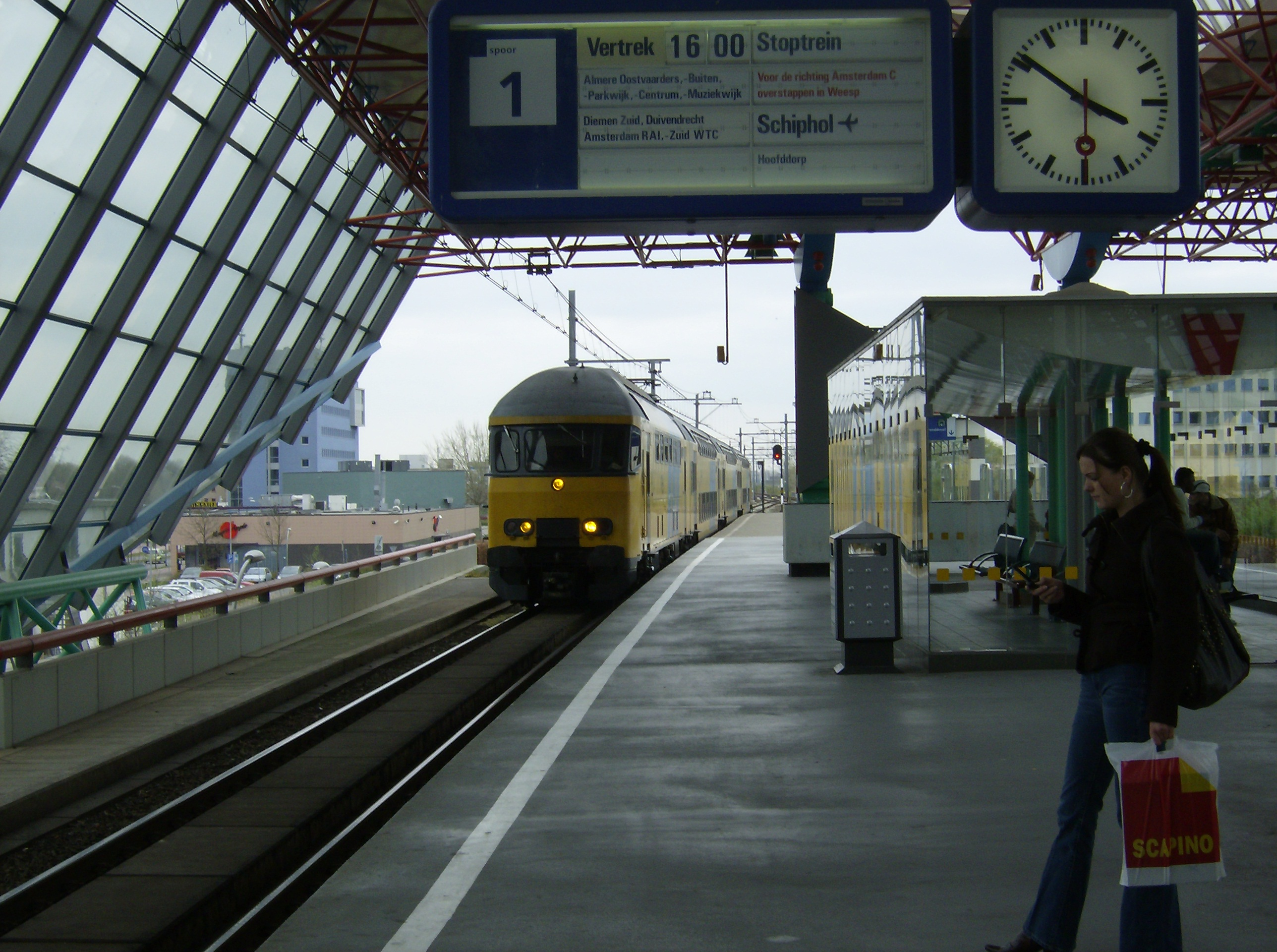
A train arrives at Lelystad Centrum

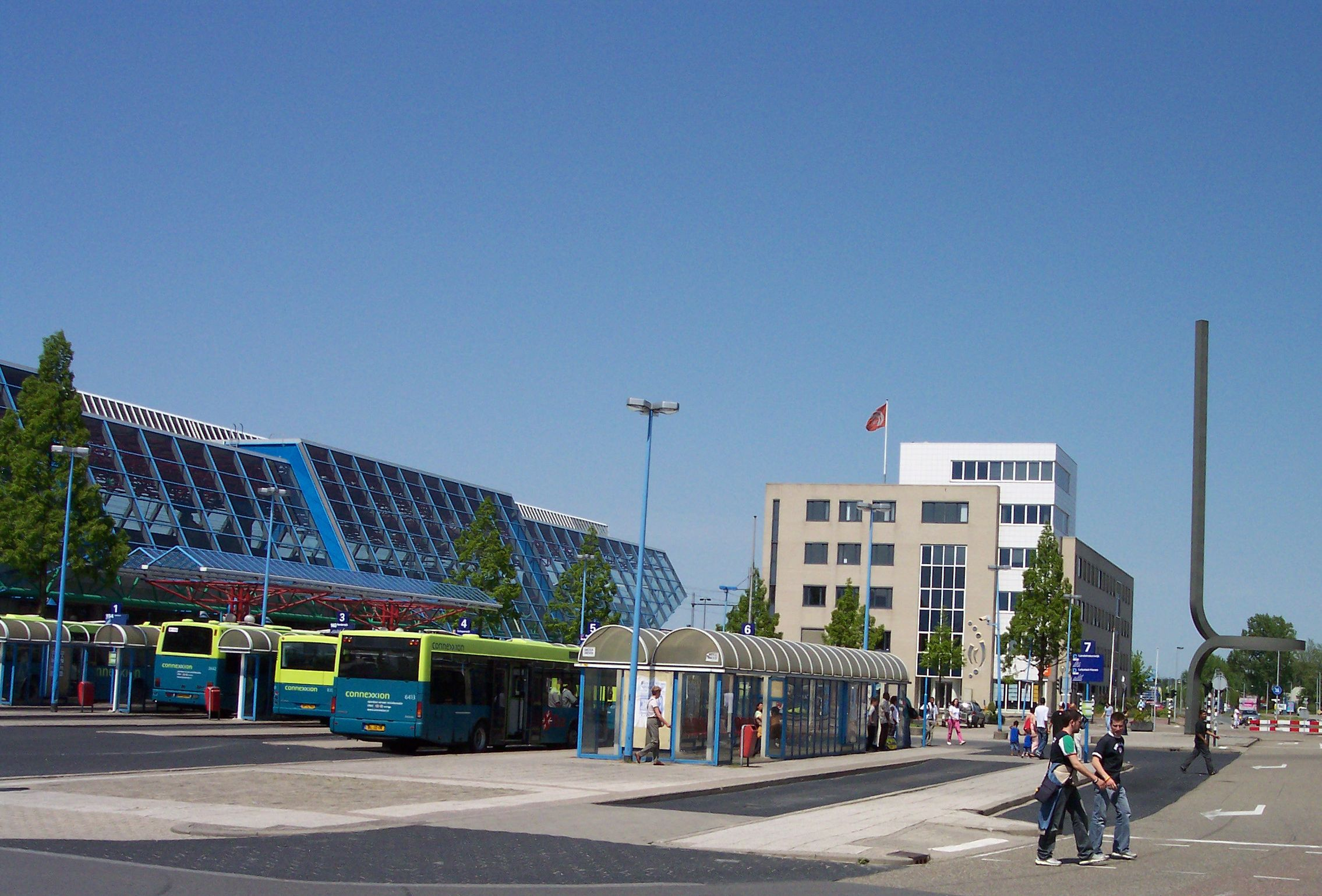
Lelystad Centrum Bus Station
