= Media Park (Hilversum) =

Business park in Hilversum, Netherlands

Coordinates: 52°14′12″N 5°10′19″E

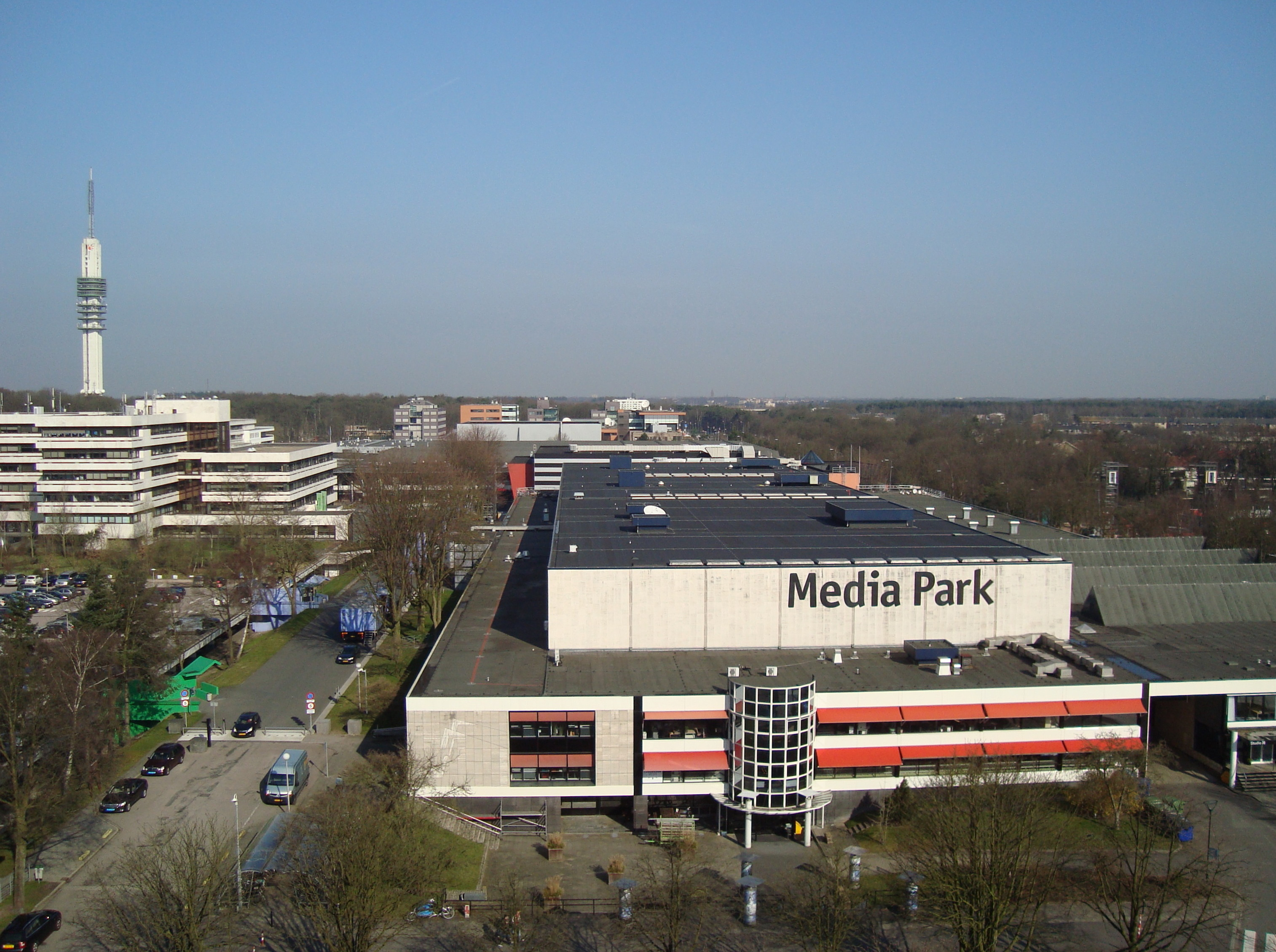
Media Park as viewed from the Netherlands Institute for Sound and Vision

Media Park (Dutch pronunciation: [ˈmeːdijaː ˌpɑr(ə)k]) is a large business park in the Dutch city of Hilversum. This site is home to a number of Dutch broadcasters and media companies, and is the headquarters of the national public broadcasting system NPO.

== Notable events ==
On 6 May 2002, right-wing politician Pim Fortuyn was assassinated in a car park outside a studio after a radio interview with Ruud de Wild at 3FM.

On 29 January 2015, a 19-year-old man invaded the NOS building, carrying a fake pistol and taking a hostage; he claimed to be part of a hackers' collective, and demanded ten minutes of airtime on the 8:00 pm edition of NOS Journaal; however, he was swiftly overpowered by police and arrested. As a result of this, the building was evacuated, and no 8:00 pm news was broadcast that night.

== Broadcasting companies ==
The broadcasting associations MAX, VARA and VPRO, which broadcast on public television channels such as NPO 1 and also on public radio stations, are located on the Media Park site. The news and sports broadcaster NOS is also located on the site but it is not technically a broadcasting association. Other broadcasting associations are located elsewhere in Hilversum: TROS for example was located south of Media Park on the Lage Naarderweg.

Non-public broadcasters such as RTL and the production companies Endemol and NEP The Netherlands also have studios and offices located on the Media Park site. The Netherlands Institute for Sound and Vision is also situated on the site.

== Transport ==
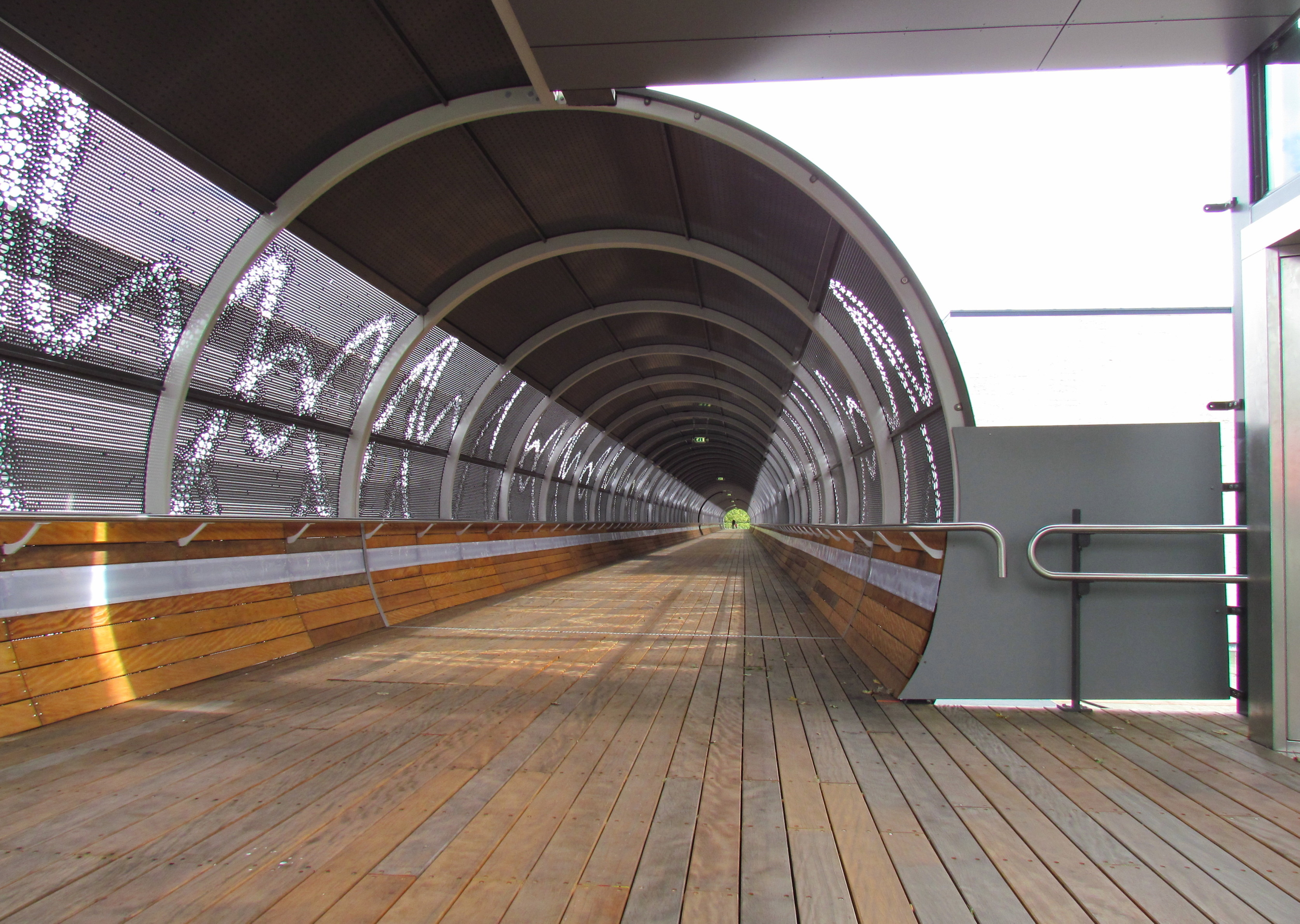
Footbridge between the site and Hilversum Media Park railway station

Media Park is served by public transport and by the Dutch road network. The southern corner of the site is close to the Hilversum ring road, and the regional N524 road runs along the east side of the site, connecting it with the nearby towns of Naarden and Bussum, and southeast Amsterdam via the N236.

Hilversum Media Park railway station is served by local Sprinter services between Hilversum, Amsterdam and Schiphol. A footbridge was constructed across the N524 (Mies Bouwmanboulevard) in 2011, directly linking the station and buildings on the Media Park.

Local and regional buses run through the Media Park site and bus stops are situated outside important offices such as those of the NOS.
