= Sprinter Lighttrain =

Dutch electric multiple unit

NS Sprinter Lighttrain (SLT) – Class 2400 / 2600
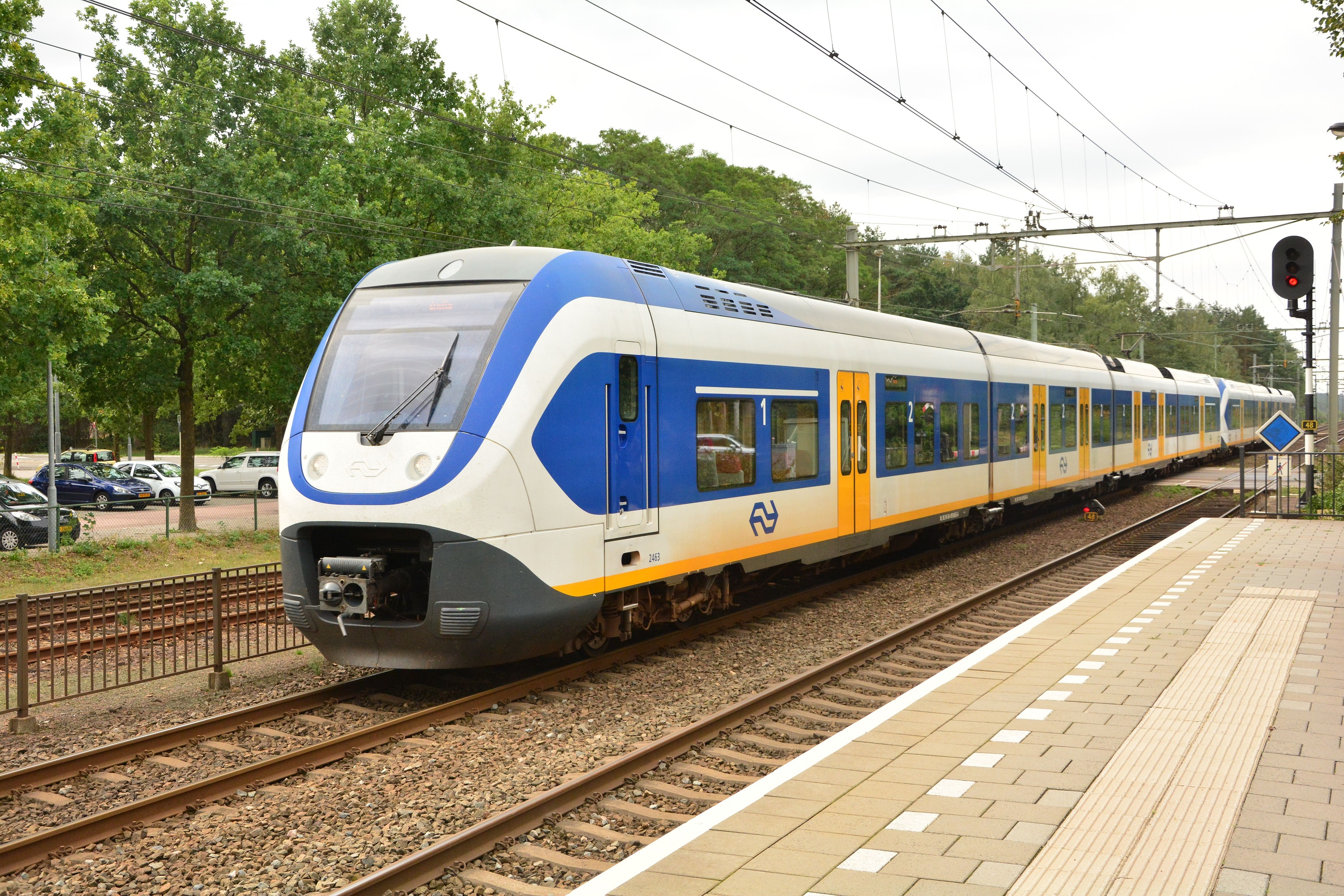
- NS2463 at 't Harde

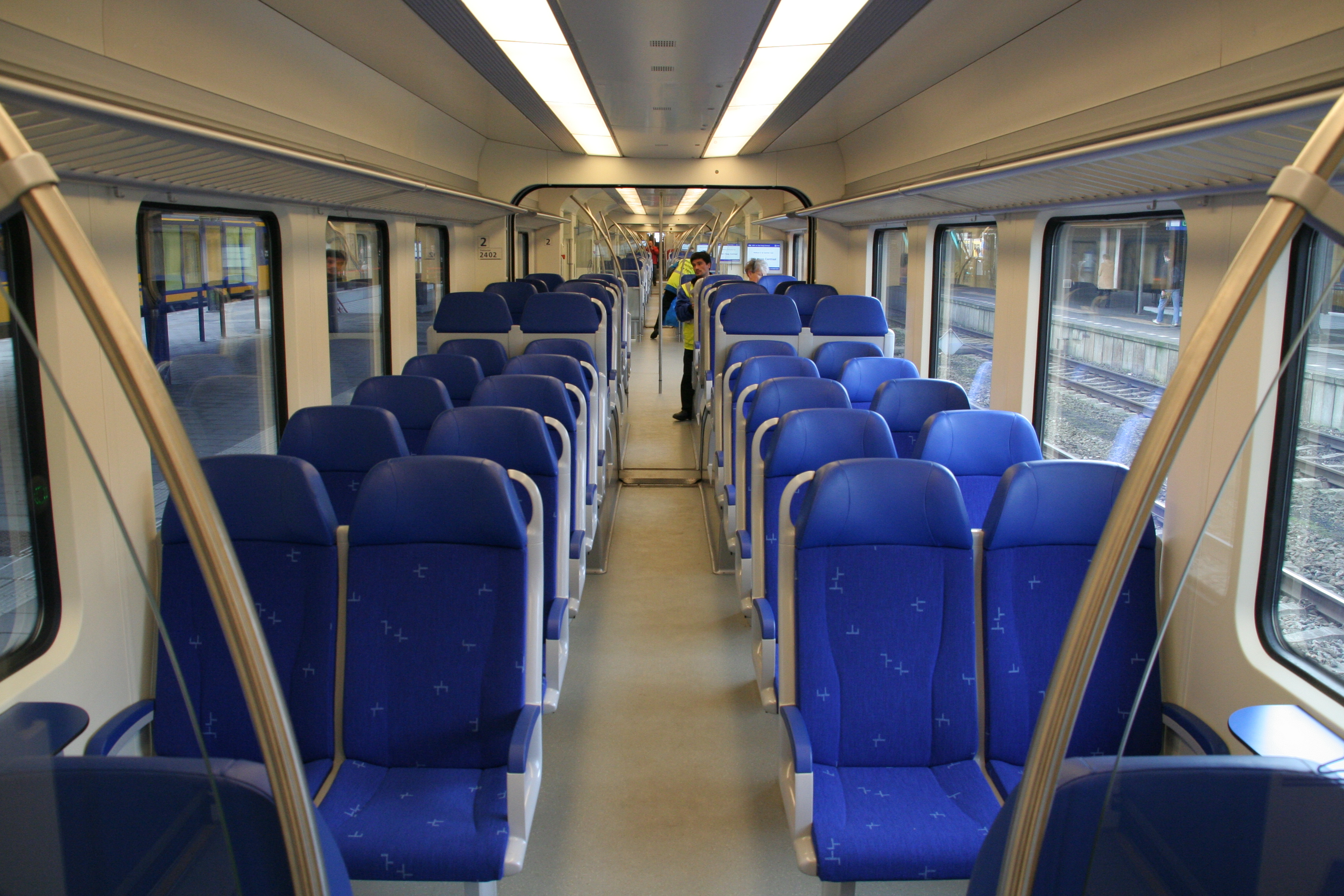
- Second class interior
- In service: 2009–present
- Manufacturer: Bombardier (2400); Siemens (2600)
- Built at: Aachen and Hennigsdorf (2400); Uerdingen (2600)
- Replaced: Mat '64, NS DD-AR
- Constructed: 2007–2012
- Refurbished: Talbot (2018–2021)
- Number built: 69 (2400); 62 (2600)
- Formation: 4: mABk + mB + B + mABk (2400) mABk + mB + AB + B + mB + mABk (2600)
- Fleet numbers: 2401–2469, 2601–2662
- Capacity: 40 1st class, 176 2nd class (2400); 56 1st class, 266 2nd class (2600)
- Operators: NS Reizigers

Specifications
- Train length: 69.36 m (227 ft 6 3/4 in) (2400); 100.54 m (329 ft 10 1/4 in) (2600)
- Width: 2.84 m (9 ft 3 3/4 in)
- Height: 4.21 m (13 ft 9 3/4 in)
- Floor height: 1,055 mm (3 ft 5 1/2 in)
- Entry: 850 mm (2 ft 9 1/2 in)
- Doors: 12 (2400); 20 (2600)
- Articulated sections: 4 (2400); 6 (2600)
- Wheel diameter: 850 mm (2 ft 9 1/2 in)
- Maximum speed: Service: 140 km/h (90 mph); Design: 160 km/h (100 mph)
- Weight: 129 t (127 long tons; 142 short tons) (2400); 176 t (173 long tons; 194 short tons) (2600)
- Axle load: 18.5 t (18.2 long tons; 20.4 short tons)
- Power output: 1,260 kW (1,690 hp) (2400); 1,680 kW (2,253 hp) (2600)
- Electric system(s): 1.5 kV DC Catenary
- Current collector(s): Pantograph
- Safety system(s): ATB-EG, ERTMS
- Track gauge: 1,435 mm (4 ft 8 1/2 in) standard gauge

The Sprinter Lighttrain or SLT is an Electric Multiple Unit (EMU) train type operated by the Nederlandse Spoorwegen in the Netherlands. They were built from 2007 to 2012 by Bombardier (2400) and Siemens (2600). It is the successor of the Sprinter SGM train type.

== Names ==
- Sprinter Lighttrain
- Sprinter
- SLT
- S70 or S100

== General information ==
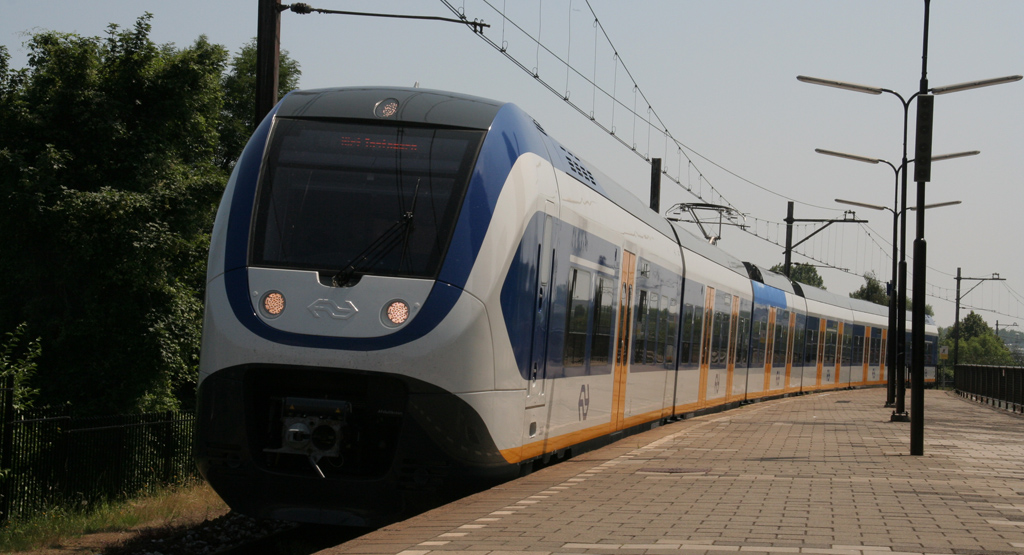
2607 arriving at Amsterdam Amstel.

The SLT is designed to replace the Mat '64 trains from the 1960s and 1970s, and to allow the double-decker NS DD-AR carriages from the 1990s to be refurbished/converted into self-propelling EMUs and transferred to longer, skip-stop Intercity services. The first 35 sets were ordered in 2005 and the first set, 2402 arrived in January 2008. The second set, 2602 arrived in February 2008 and both were used on test runs. In September 2007 NS ordered a further 64 sets, and these started arriving in the Netherlands in mid-2009. In 2009 a further 32 were ordered. The trains use regenerative braking, which can feed energy back into the contact wire when they brake.

The trains are based on the DB Class 425 design, but adapted to meet the demands of NS and the Dutch railway network. They use Jacobs bogies, which allow for thin and wide gangways between each coach. The units were built in Aachen and Hennigsdorf (2400) and Uerdingen (2600).

The SLT trains are fitted with the ATB-EG train protection system used on the electrified Dutch network, as well as the European-standard ERTMS system that is planned to replace ATB-EG. The SLT trains are also fitted with GSM-R train radios.

== Modernisation ==
From 2018 onwards, all units are being retrofitted with on-board toilets and a special sliding step for wheelchair users, in response to the need to provide on-board toilets on all trains running on the hoofdrailnet as stipulated in the contract for NS to operate the 2015–25 concession. The toilet retrofit is conducted at the Talbot Services GmbH workshops in Aachen; of which 2 units are in the workshops at any one time. The expectations are that these modernisations will be completed in 2021.

== Use of Sprinter Lighttrains ==
The SLT is primarily for the Randstad area, around the four main cities (Amsterdam, Utrecht, The Hague and Rotterdam). They are used on stoptrein stopping services, designed for routes where stations are close together and for this they feature many wide doors and fast acceleration.

After many test runs without passengers, they were put into service on 23 February 2009 between Den Haag Centraal – Gouda – Utrecht Centraal, two months later than planned. Passengers were happy with the comfort, no step between the train and the platform and the fresh interior, however the trains back then lacked on-board toilets.

Problems occurred, especially when there was a four-car and a six-car unit coupled together, so the test was stopped temporarily on 1 May 2009. The test started again on 21 September 2009, outside of the peak hours. Again there were problems, and the delivery of sets was stopped for the time being.

With the December 2009 timetable change, sets were put in again between Utrecht and Den Haag, as well as between Gouda and Rotterdam. In February 2010, the delivery of new sets was restarted, with four sets arriving each week. In May 2010 SLT sets also began operating between Rotterdam Centraal and Hoek van Holland Strand and on 24 May 2010 also between Utrecht Centraal and Baarn via Soest.

In December 2010 more than 2/3 of the SLT's failed after snowfall, leaving the NS to revert to the old trains that had recently been stored out of services.

== Services operated ==
The SLT's are regularly used on these services in the current timetable (2017). They can sometimes appear on other services.

Series	Train Type	Route	Material	Notes
4000	Sprinter	Uitgeest – Zaandam – Amsterdam Sloterdijk – Amsterdam Centraal – Amsterdam Amstel – Amsterdam Bijlmer ArenA – Breukelen – Gouda – Rotterdam Alexander – Rotterdam Centraal	SLT	
4300	Sprinter	Hoofddorp – Schiphol Airport – Amsterdam Zuid – Duivendrecht – Weesp – Almere Centrum – Almere Oostvaarders	SLT	
4600	Sprinter	Den Haag Centraal – Den Haag Laan van NOI – Leiden Centraal – Hoofddorp – Schiphol Airport – Amsterdam Sloterdijk – Amsterdam Centraal	SLT, SNG	This train continues as 14600 to Zwolle
4900	Sprinter	Utrecht Centraal – Utrecht Overvecht – Hilversum – Naarden-Bussum – Almere Centrum	SLT	This train stops only towards Utrecht Centraal in Utrecht Overvecht. At Sundays, this train drives is only 1 train per hour. This train drives until 8:00 pm
5700	Sprinter	Hoofddorp – Schiphol Airport – Amsterdam Zuid – Duivendrecht – Weesp – Naarden-Bussum – Hilversum – Utrecht Overvecht – Utrecht Centraal	SLT	This train drives until 8:00 pm
5800	Sprinter	Hoofddorp – Schiphol Airport – Amsterdam Sloterdijk – Amsterdam Centraal	SLT	This train continues as 15800 to Amersfoort Vathorst
6000	Sprinter	Utrecht Centraal – Houten – Geldermalsen – Tiel	SLT	This train continues as 6100 to Woerden at Mondays, Tuesdays, Thursdays and Fridays.
6100	Sprinter	Woerden – Utrecht Centraal	SLT	This train drives only at weekdays until 8:00 pm and continues as 6000 to Woerden, but not at Wednesdays.
6800	Sprinter	Den Haag Centraal – Zoetermeer – Gouda – Gouda Goverwelle	SLT	This train drives only at weekdays until 8:00 pm
6900	Sprinter	Utrecht Centraal – Houten – Geldermalsen – 's-Hertogenbosch	SLT	This train drives only 1 train per hour between Geldermalsen and 's-Hertogenbosch, after 10:00 pm. This train continues as 7800 to Den Haag Centraal
7300	Sprinter	Breukelen – Utrecht Centraal – Veenendaal Centrum	SLT, SGMm	
7400	Sprinter	Uitgeest – Zaandam – Amsterdam Sloterdijk – Amsterdam Centraal – Amsterdam Amstel – Amsterdam Bijlmer ArenA - Breukelen – Utrecht Centraal – Driebergen-Zeist – Rhenen	SLT, SGM	
7800	Sprinter	Den Haag Centraal – Zoetermeer – Gouda – Woerden – Utrecht Centraal	SLT	This train continues as 6900 to 's-Hertogenbosch
8800	Intercity	Leiden Centraal – Leiden Lammenschans – Alphen aan den Rijn – Bodegraven – Woerden – Utrecht Centraal	SLT	
14600	Sprinter	Amsterdam Centraal – Weesp – Almere Centrum – Almere Oostvaarders – Lelystad Centrum – Zwolle	SLT,SNG	This train continues as 4600 to Den Haag Centraal.
14900	Sprinter	Utrecht Centraal – Utrecht Overvecht – Hilversum – Naarden-Bussum – Almere Centrum	SLT	This train only drives after 8:00 pm and drives only 1 time per hour between Hilversum and Almere Centrum.
15600	Sprinter	Amersfoort Centraal – Nijkerk – Harderwijk	SLT	This train stops only on Amersfoort Centraal, Nijkerk and Harderwijk
15800	Sprinter	Amsterdam Centraal – Weesp – Naarden-Bussum – Hilversum – Amersfoort – Amersfoort Vathorst	SLT	This train continues as 5800 to Hoofddorp.

== Accidents and incidents ==
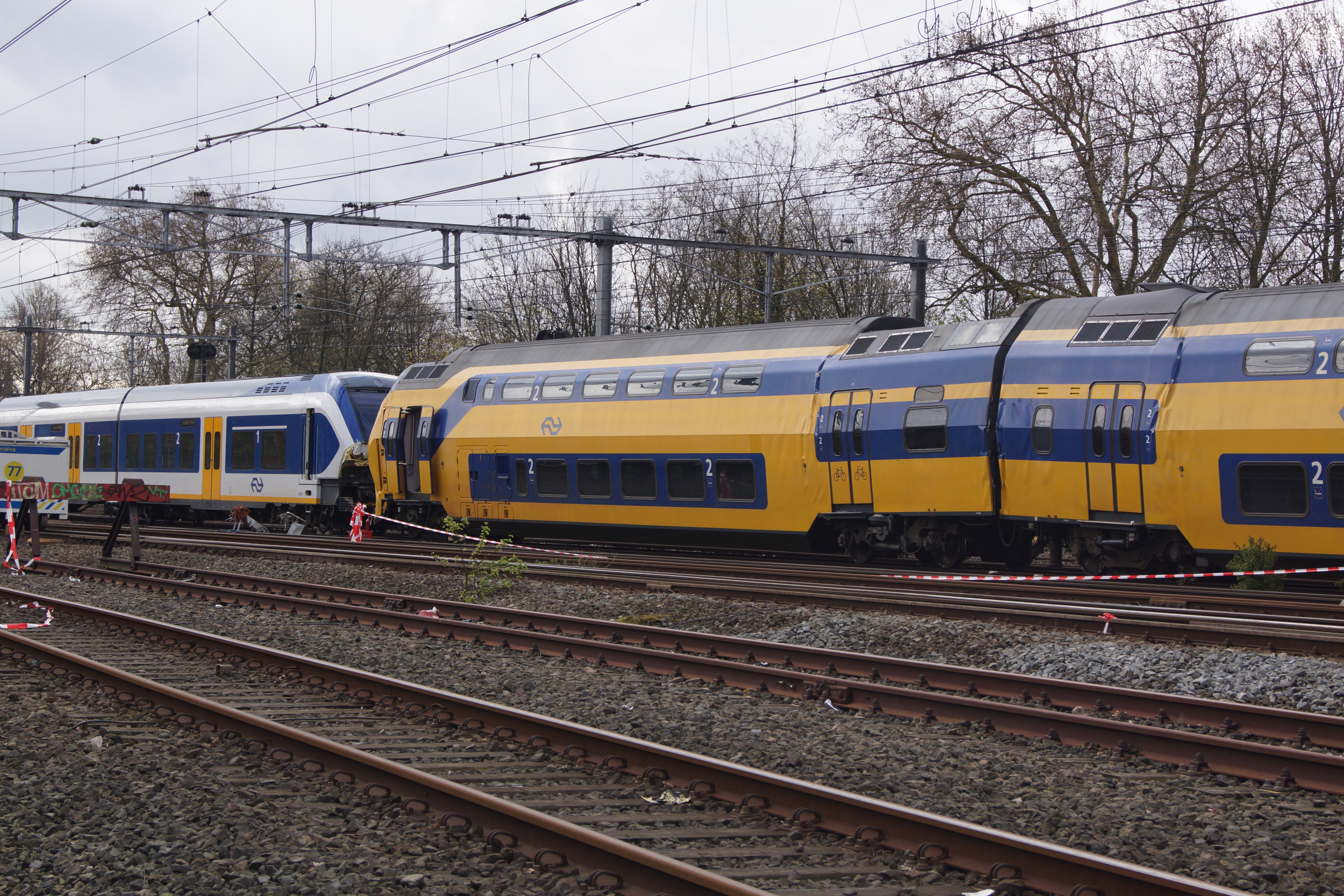
2012 collision involving an NS Sprinter Lighttrain unit (left)

- On 28 November 2011, a Sprinter collided with a stationary Sprinter at Leiden Centraal. Three passengers were injured.
- On 21 April 2012, unit 2658 was one of the two trains involved in a head-on collision near Amsterdam Sloterdijk station.

== Gallery ==
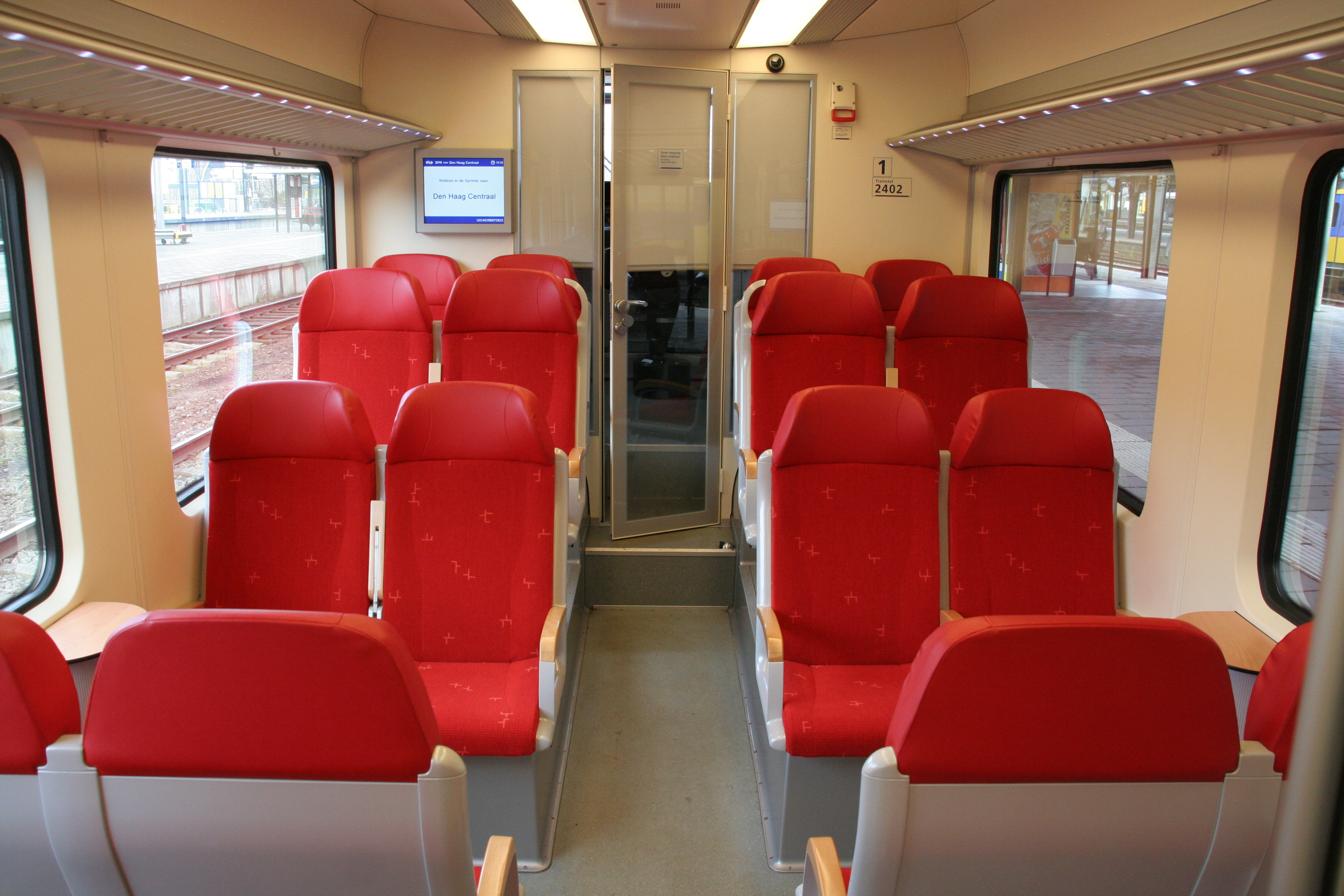
1st Class seating

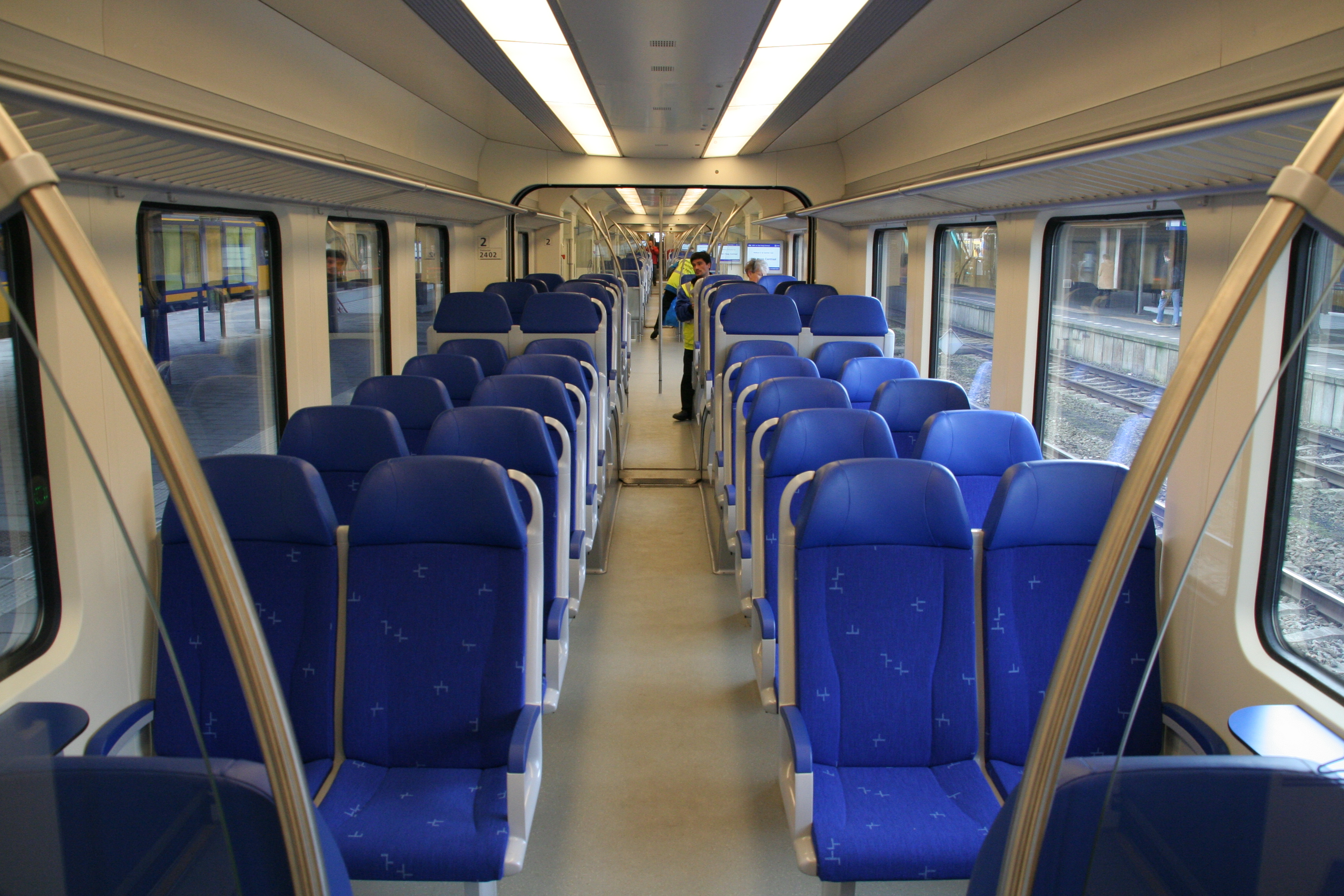
2nd Class seating

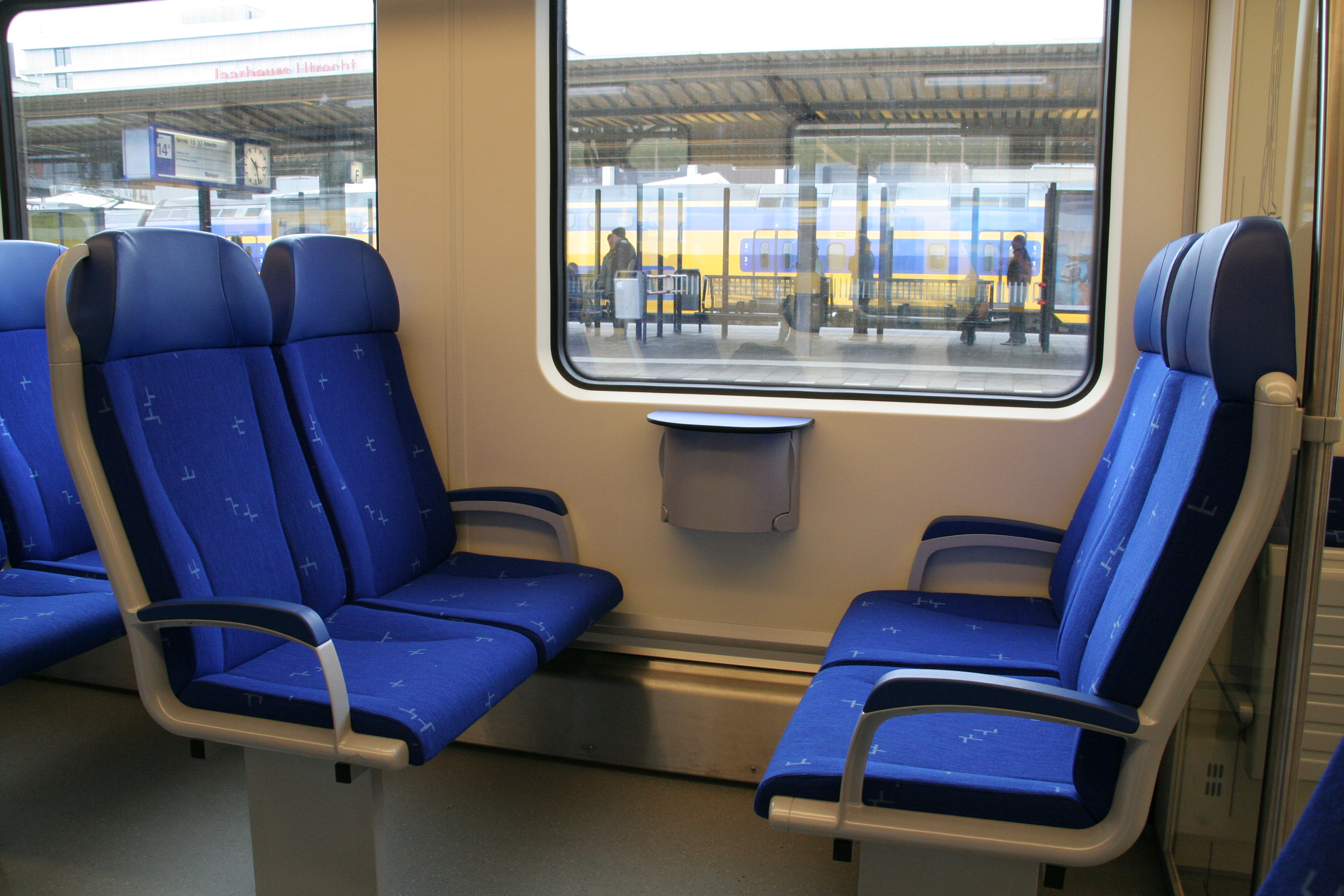
2nd Class seating

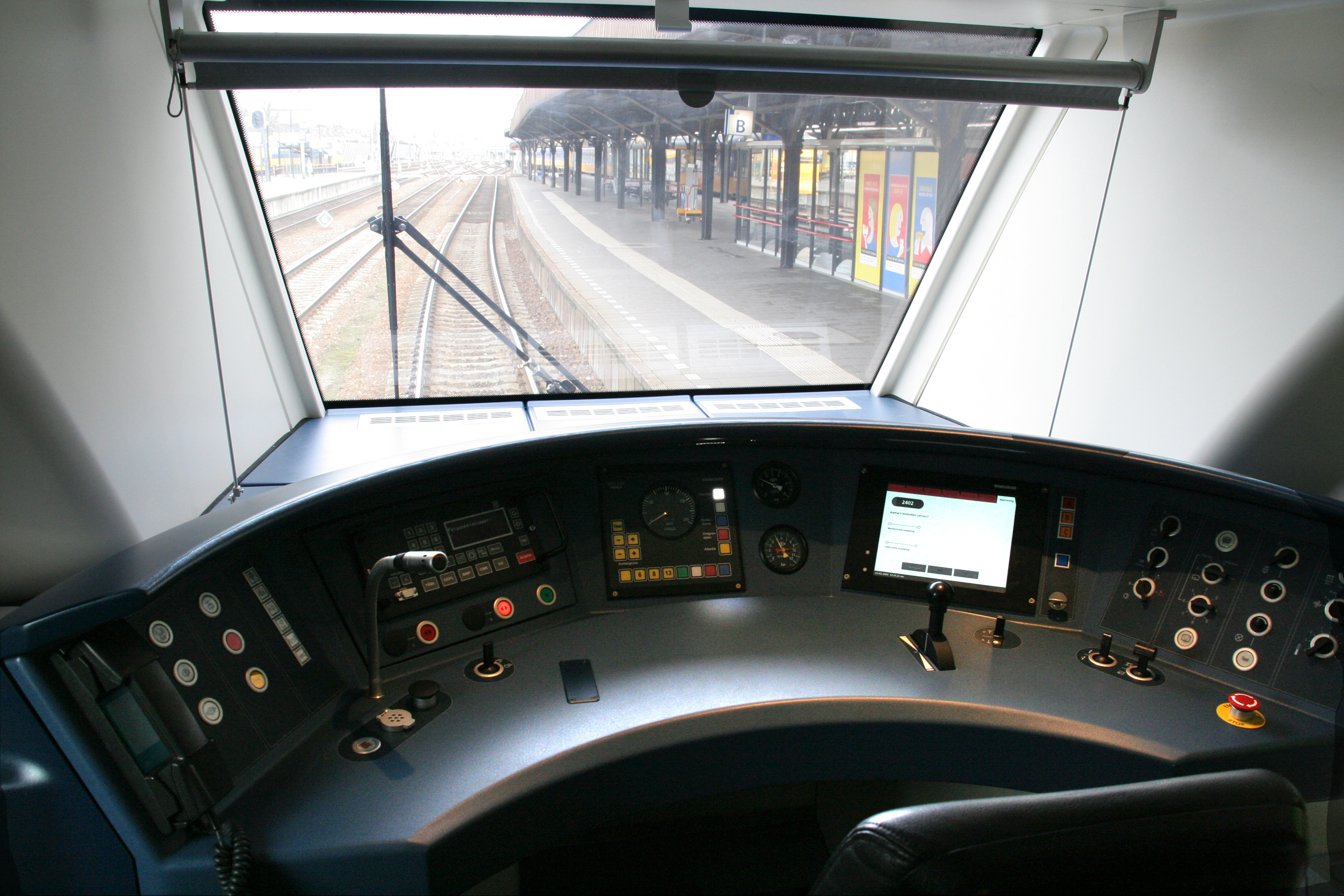
Cab View

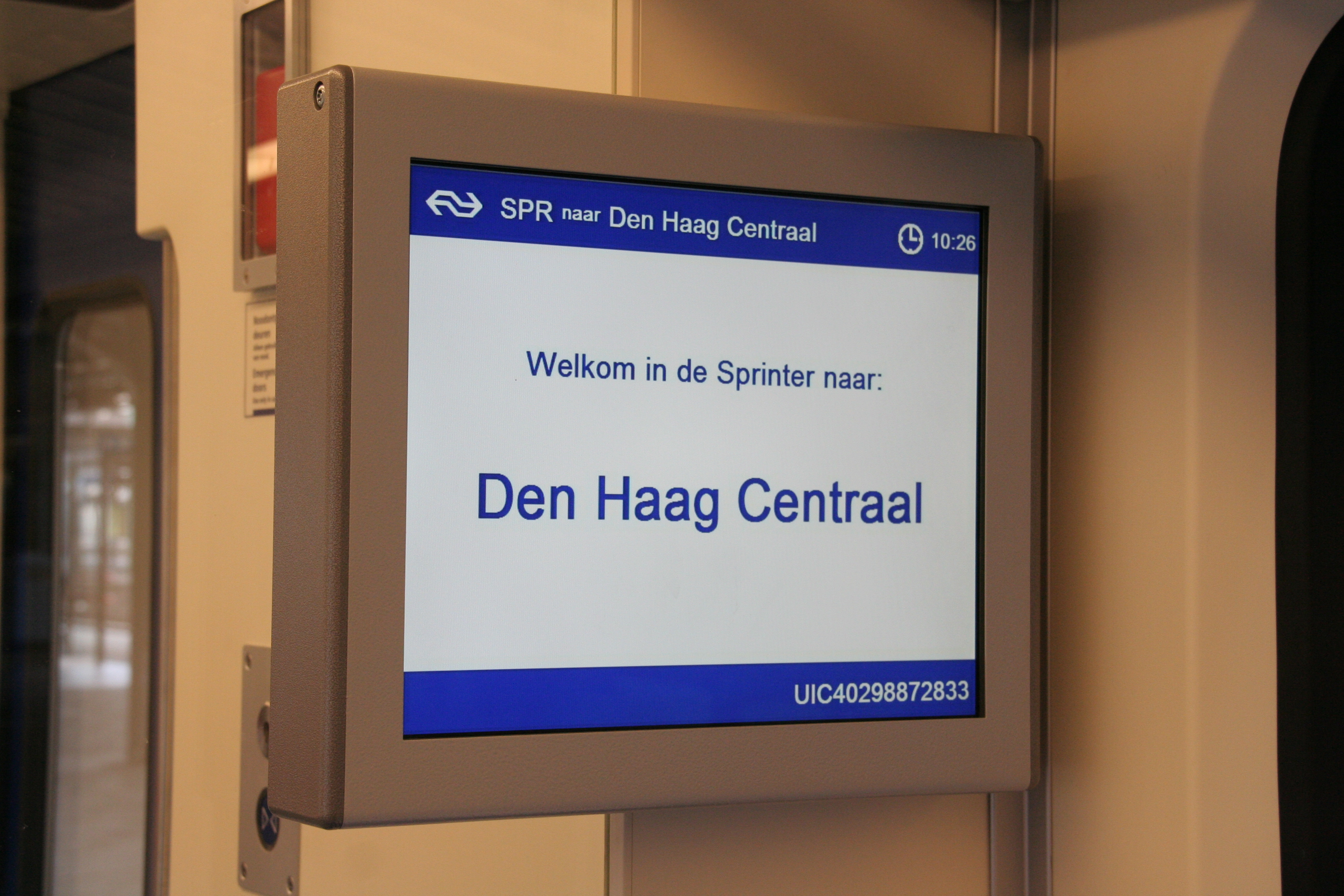
Display Screens on SLT

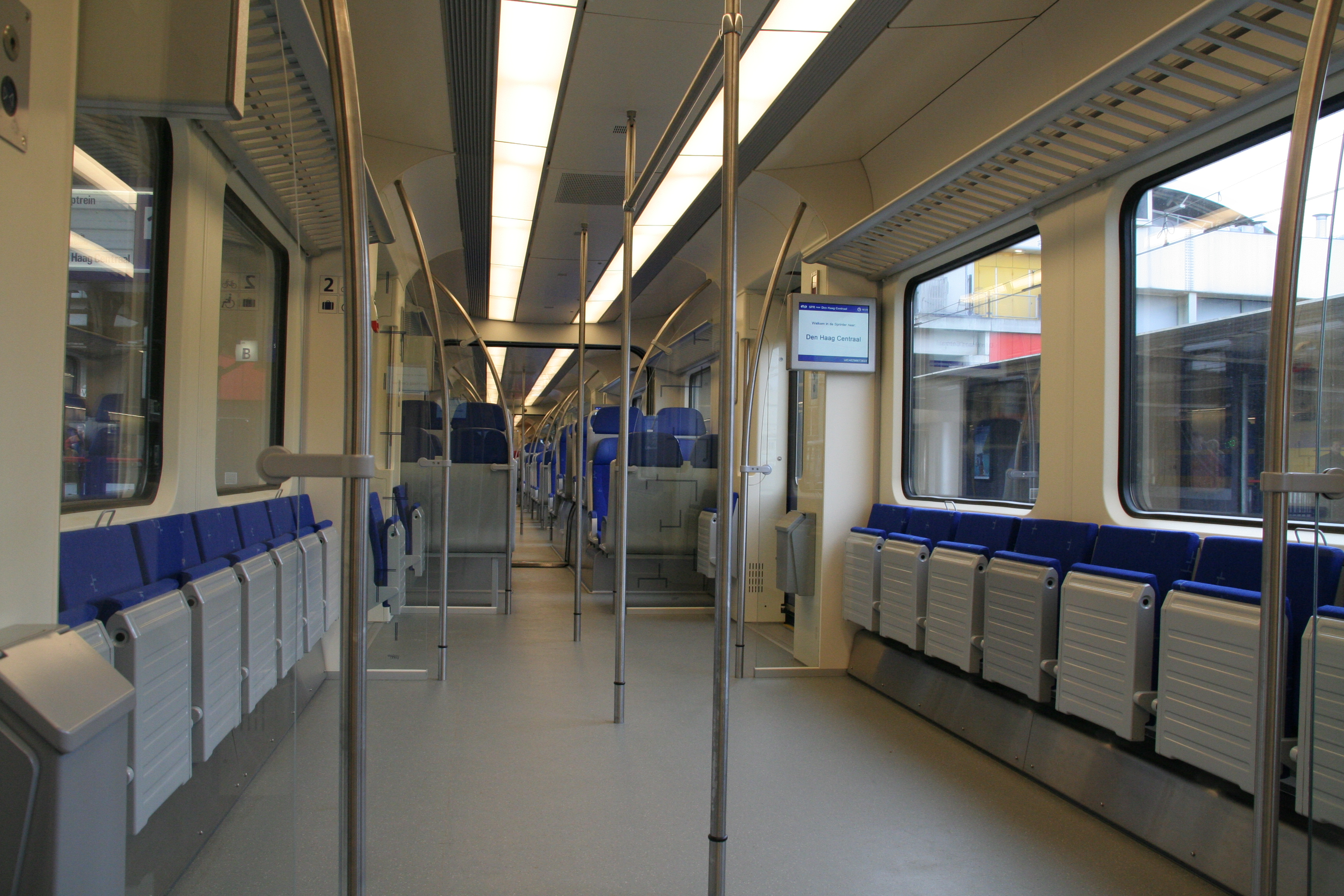
Balcony area of 2nd Class seats

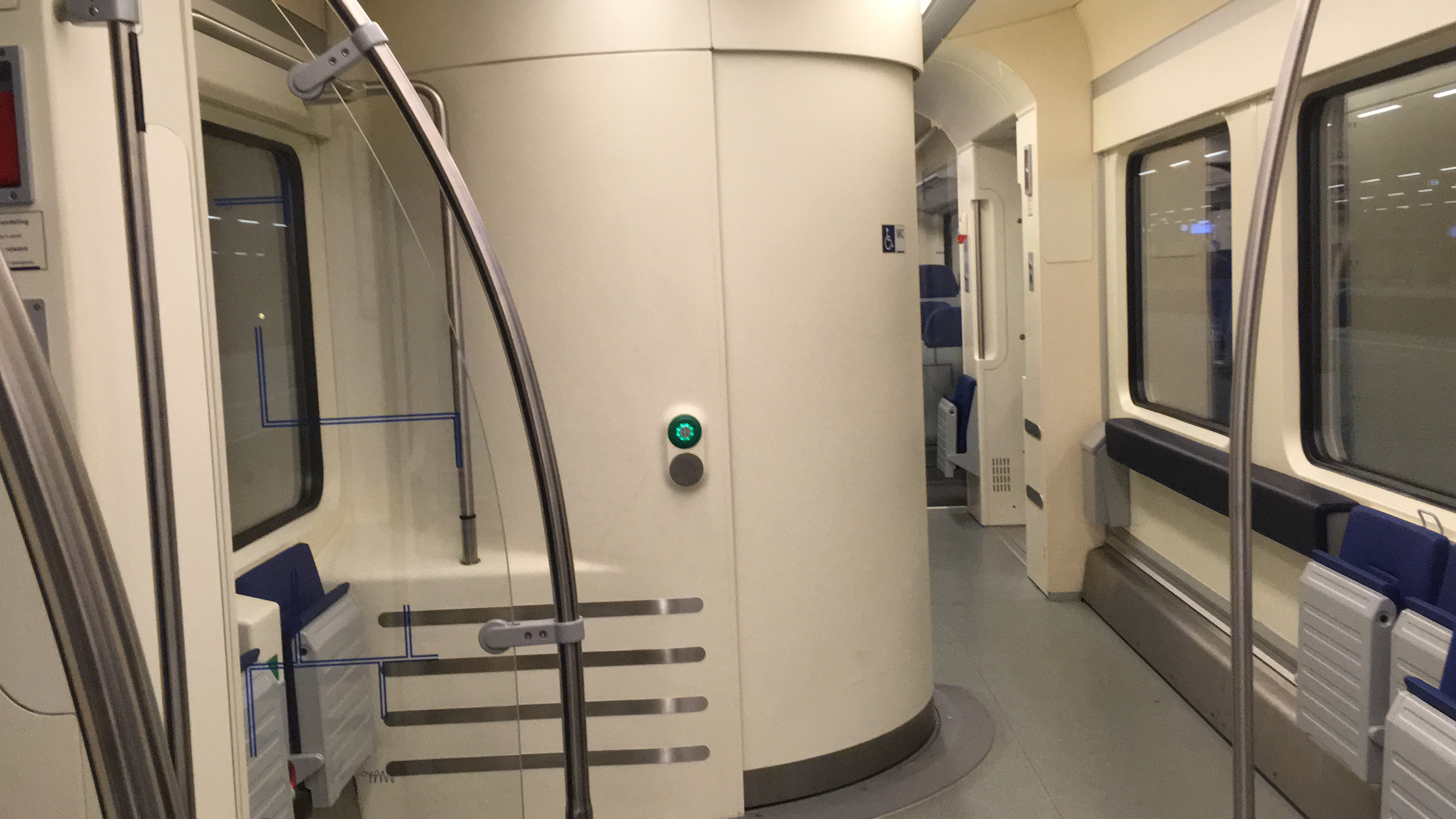
On-board toilet unit of SLT 2424

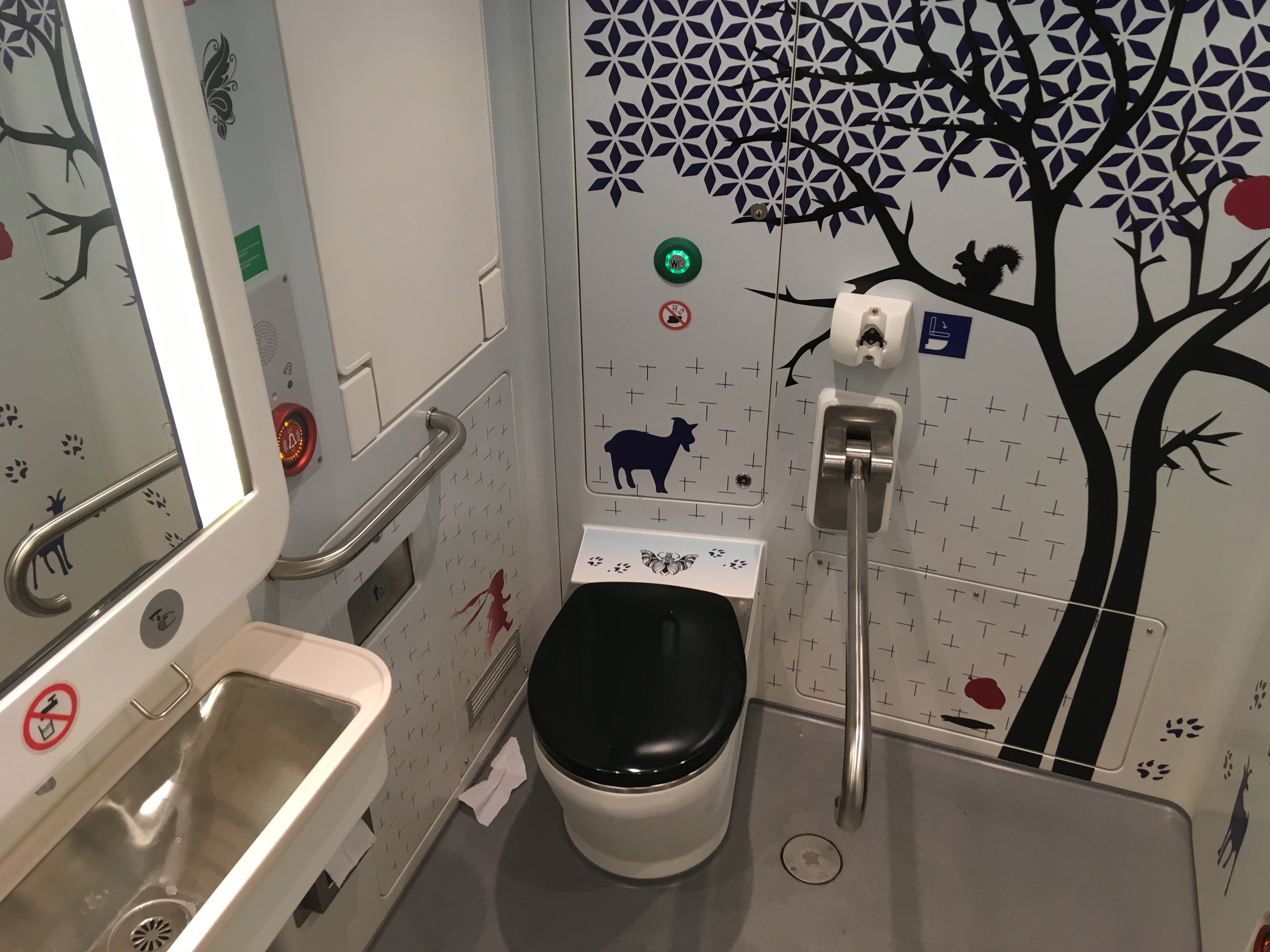
Inside the toilet

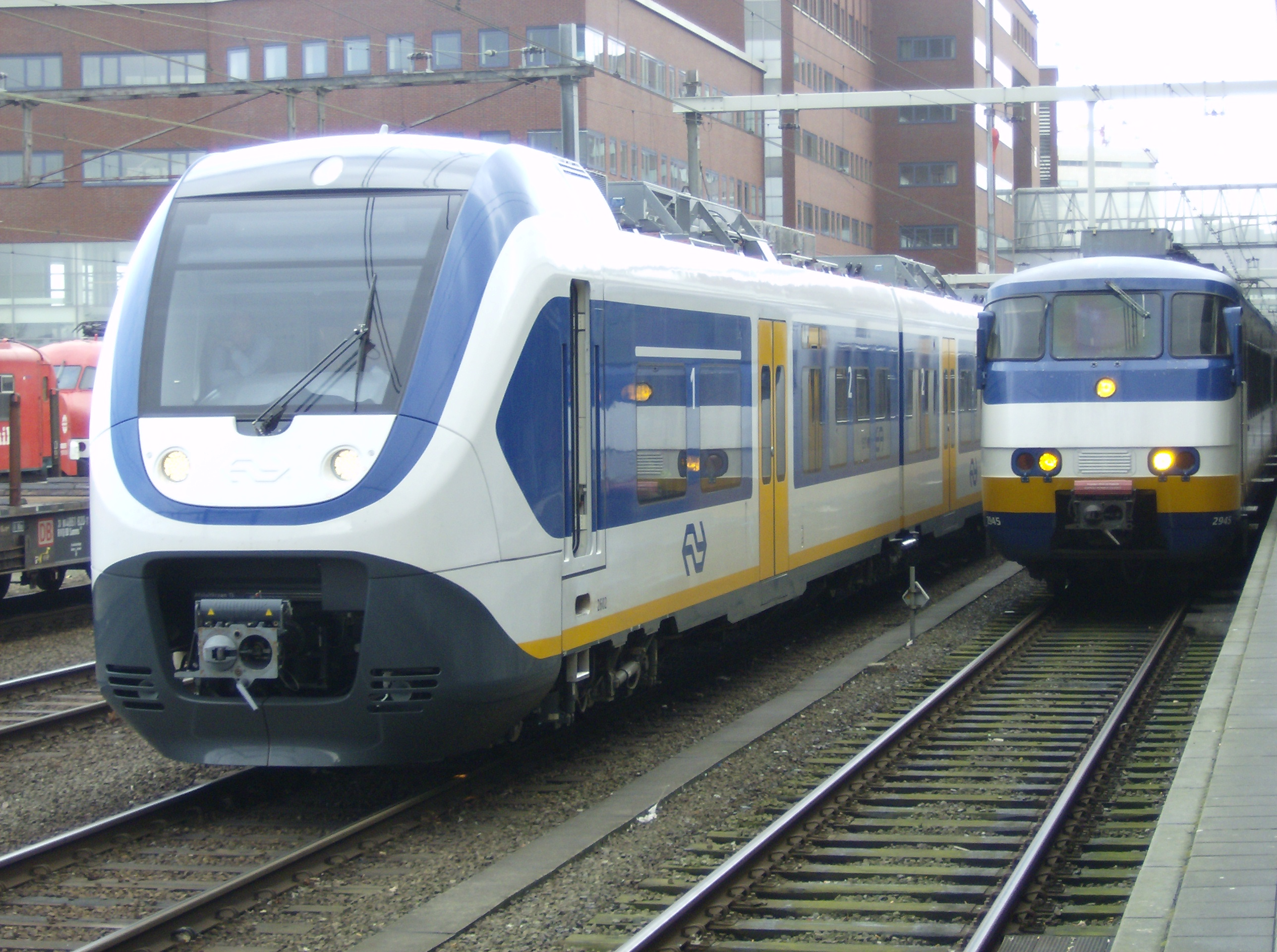
SLT and original Sprinter together at Amersfoort

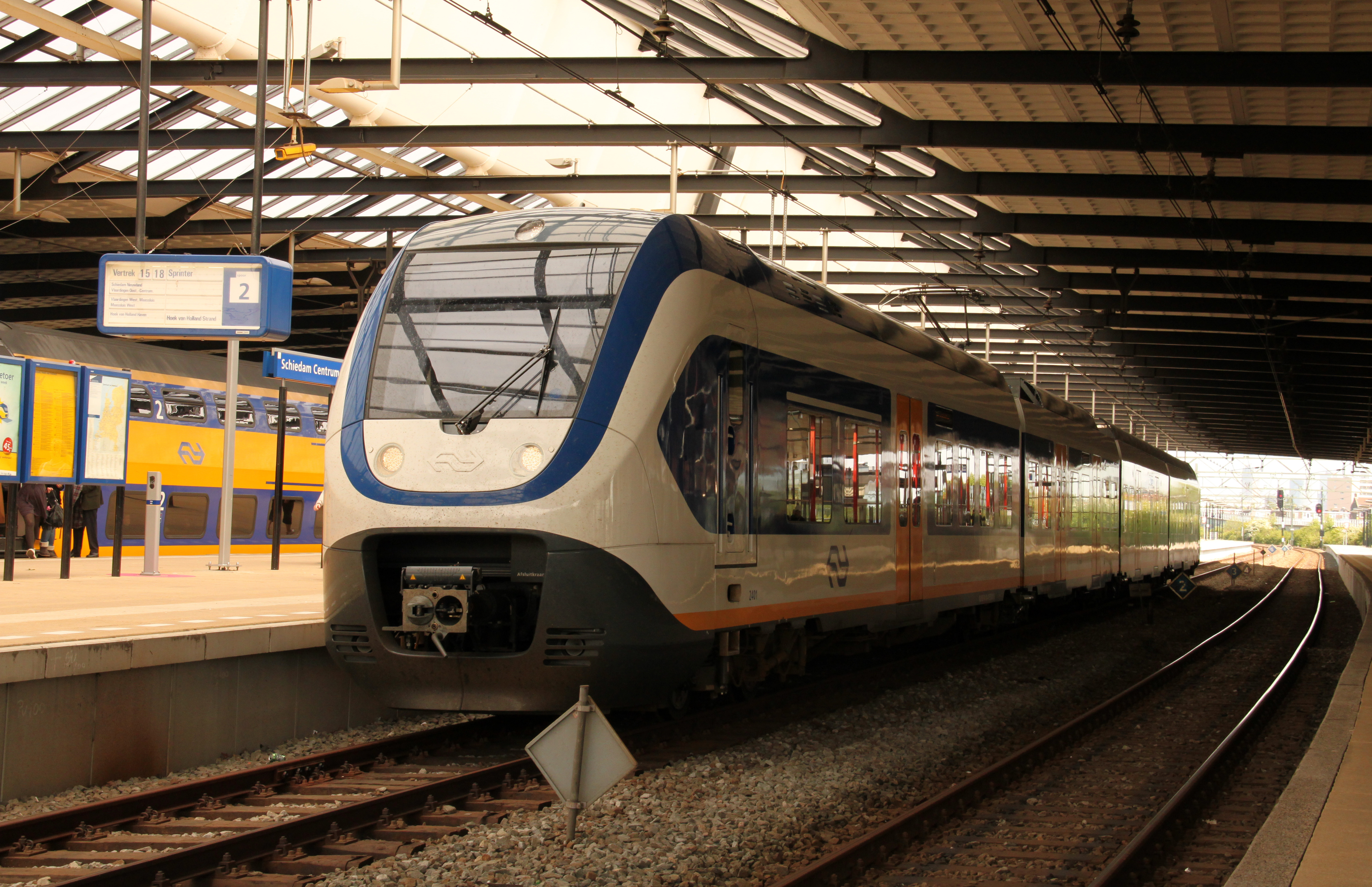
SLT 2401 in service at Schiedam Centrum

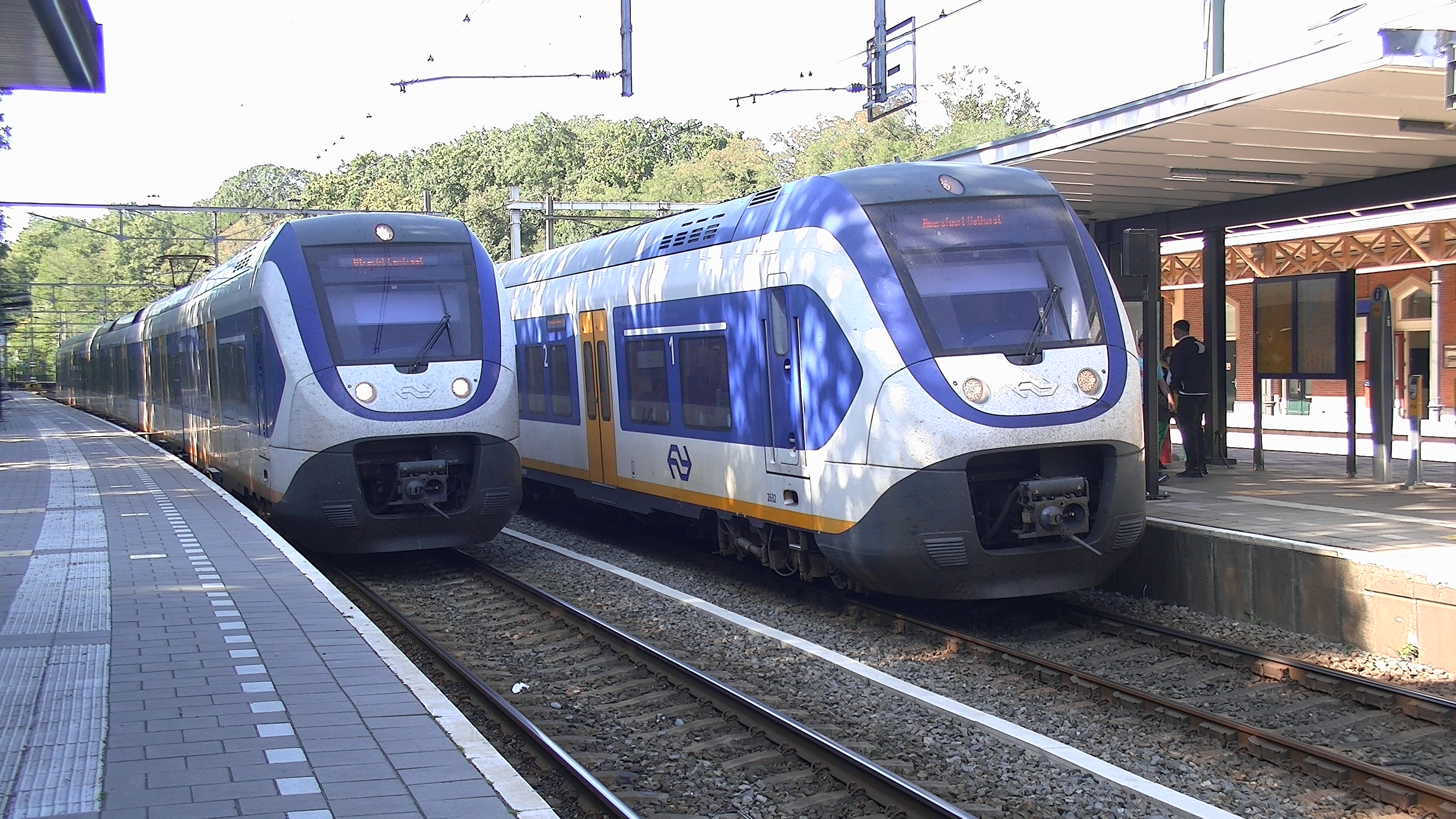
Two SLT multiple units at Baarn railway station
