= Penicillium bussumense =

Scientific classification
- Domain: Eukaryota
- Kingdom: Fungi
- Division: Ascomycota
- Class: Eurotiomycetes
- Order: Eurotiales
- Family: Aspergillaceae
- Genus: Penicillium
- Species: P. bussumense

Binomial name
- Penicillium bussumense Houbraken 2014

Species of fungus

Penicillium bussumense is a fungus species of the genus of Penicillium which is named after Bussum, in the Netherlands, where this species was first isolated.

== See also ==
- List of Penicillium species
