= Hilversum Media Park railway station =

Railway station in the Netherlands

Hilversum Media Park
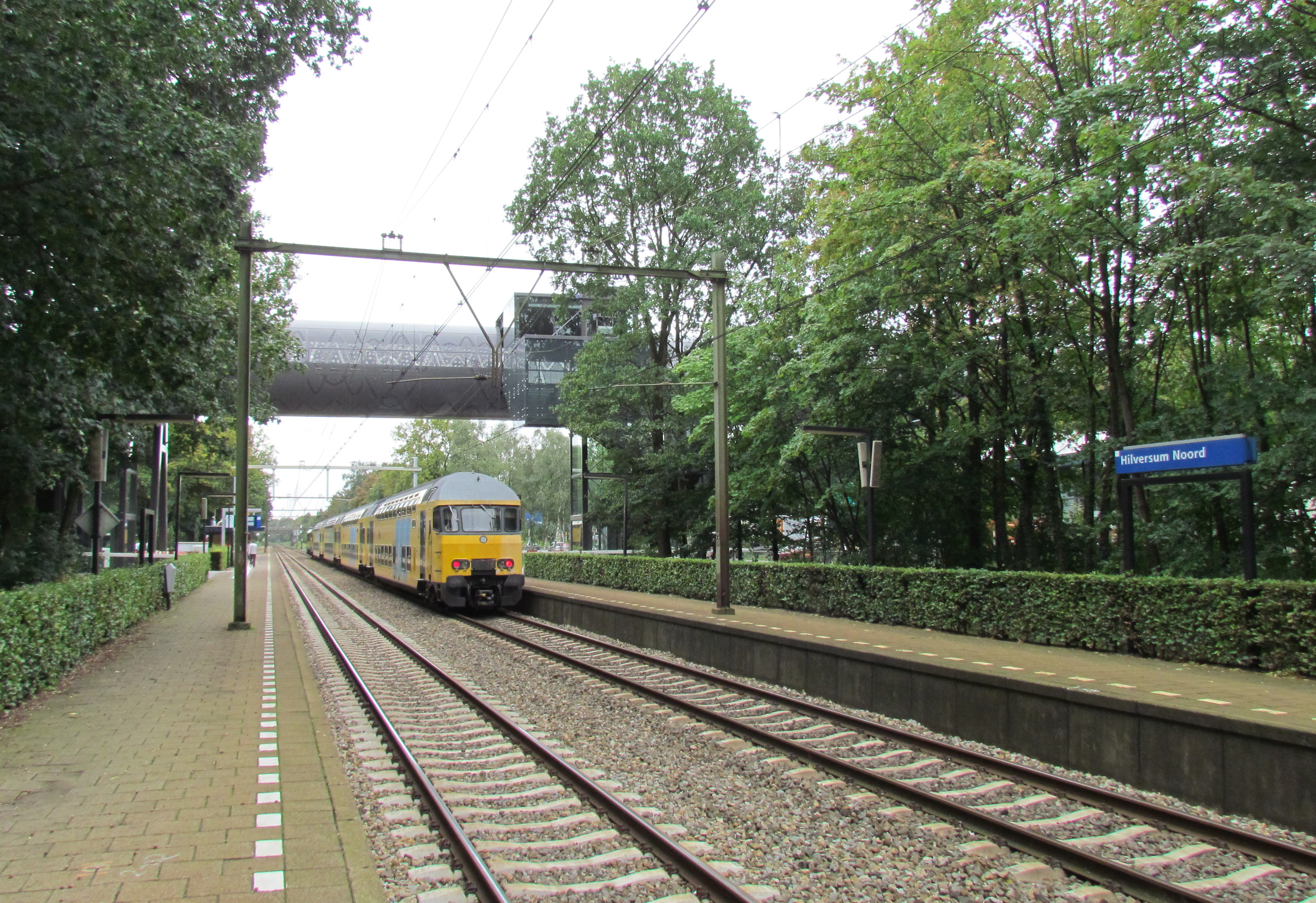
- The railway station in 2011

General information
- Location: Hilversum, Netherlands
- Coordinates: 52°14′16″N 5°10′26″E
- Line: Amsterdam–Zutphen railway

History
- Opened: 25 September 1974

Services
Preceding station	Nederlandse Spoorwegen	Following station
Bussum Zuid towards Leiden Centraal	NS Sprinter 5700 until 20:30	Hilversum towards Utrecht Centraal
Bussum Zuid towards Amsterdam Centraal	NS Sprinter 5800	Hilversum towards Amersfoort Vathorst
Location
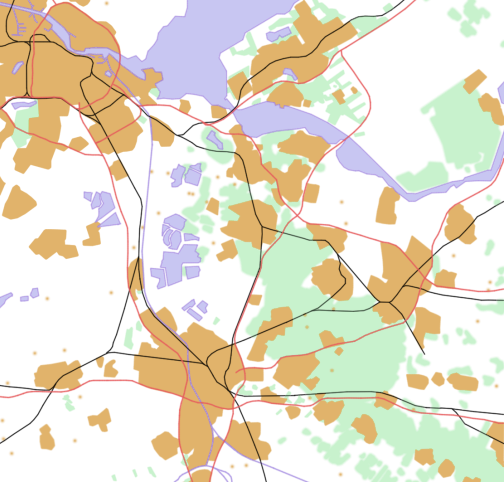
- Location within Northeastern Randstad Location within Netherlands

Hilversum Media Park (Dutch pronunciation: [ˌɦɪlvərsʏˈmeːdijaː ˌpɑr(ə)k]), previously called Hilversum NOS (1974–1989) and Hilversum Noord (1989–2013), is a railway station in the city of Hilversum, Netherlands. Opened on 25 September 1974, Hilversum Media Park is located on kilometre 27 of the Amsterdam–Zutphen railway, partly called the Gooilijn because of the region it runs through. The station is situated north of the city centre, serving the Media Park, where most Dutch television and radio broadcasters are located. The station has two platforms, which are connected through a covered footbridge. Before 1989, the station was named after the public broadcaster Nederlandse Omroep Stichting, more commonly referred to as NOS.

== Train services ==
Nederlandse Spoorwegen operates the following services from the station (4 trains per hour):

Route	Service type	Notes
Utrecht – Hilversum – Weesp – Amsterdam Zuid – Schiphol Airport – Leiden – The Hague	Local ("Sprinter")	2x per hour
Hoofddorp – Schiphol Airport – Amsterdam Centraal – Weesp – Hilversum – Amersfoort Vathorst	Local ("Sprinter")	2x per hour

=== Bus services ===
Line	Route	Operator	Notes
107	Hilversum - Bussum - Blaricum Ziekenhuis (Hospital)	Connexxion	

Note: Local bus route 2 (operated by Connexxion) serves the station indirectly; it has a bus stop Stephensonlaan, 3 minutes away (by walking) from the station.

== Gallery ==
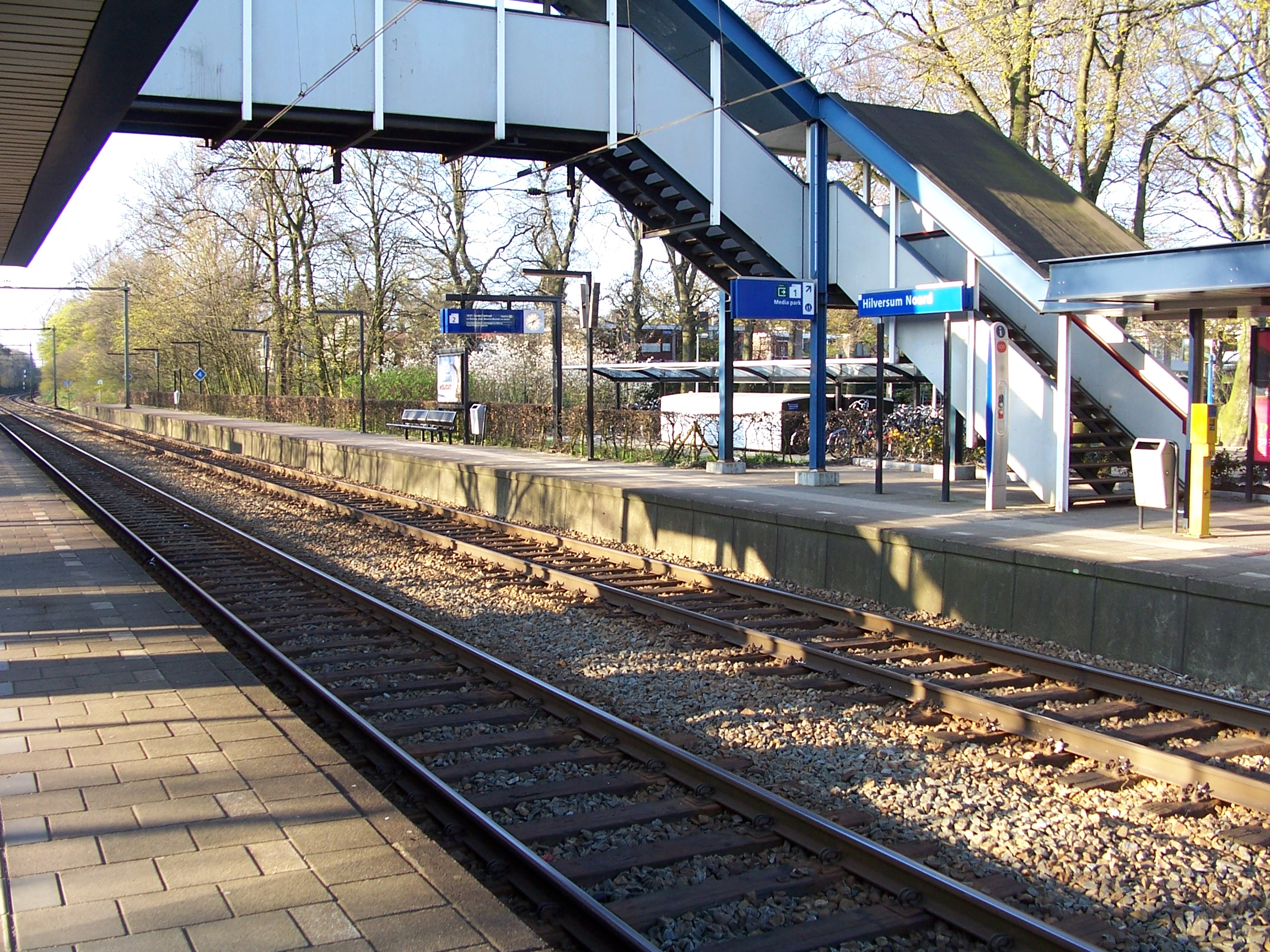
Hilversum Noord in 2007, with the old footbridge

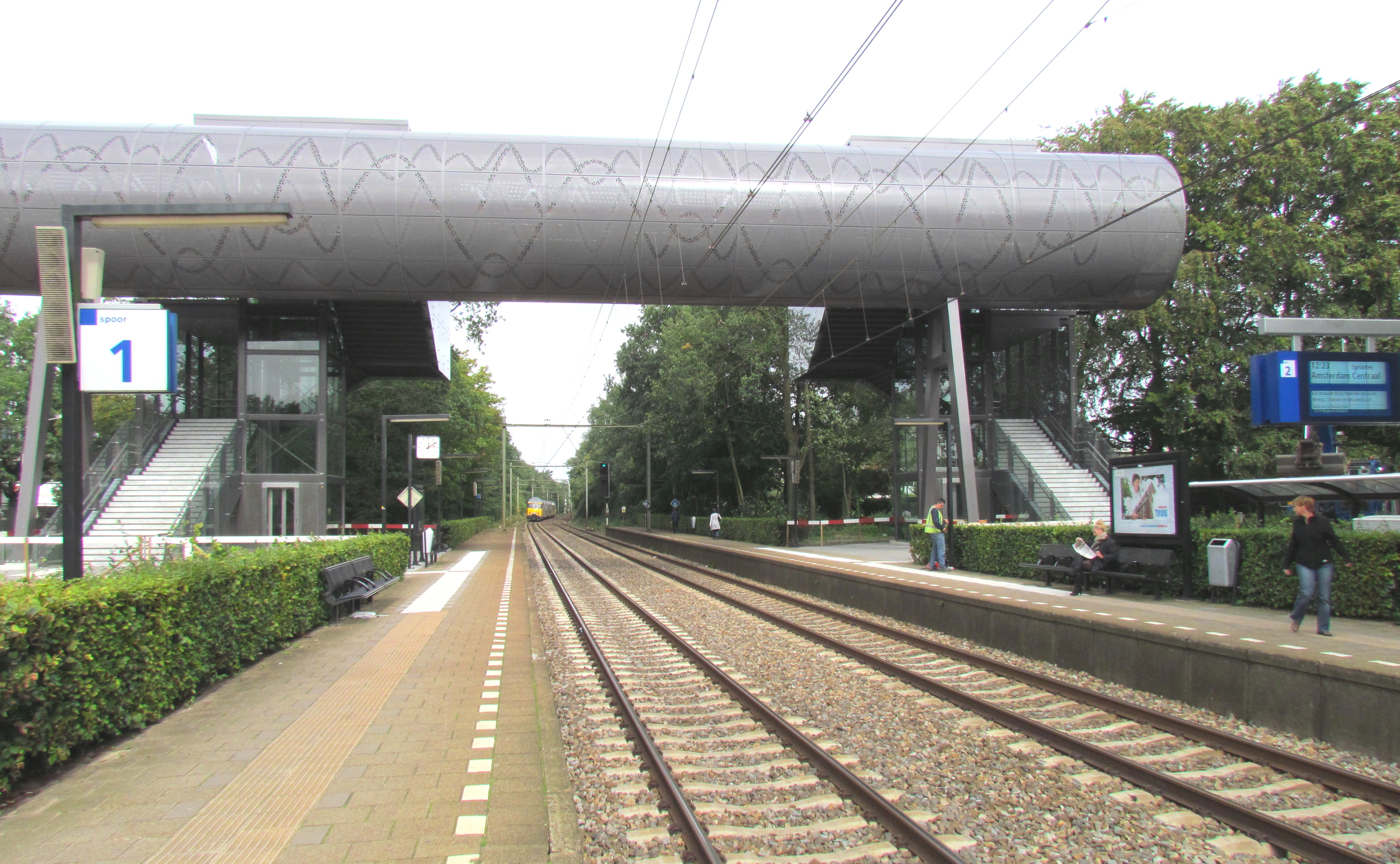
The station in 2011

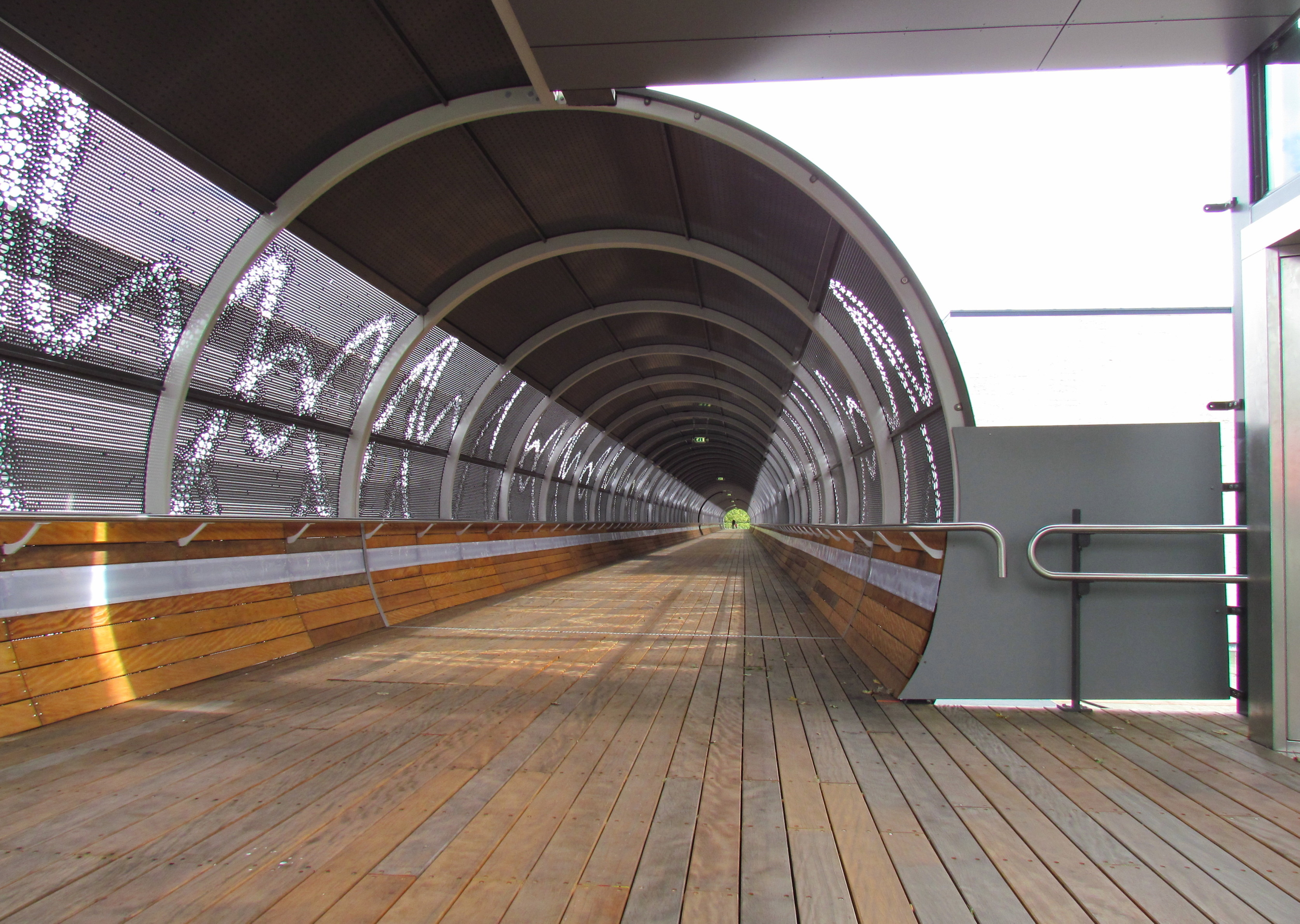
Interior of the new footbridge
