= Bussum Zuid railway station =

Railway station in the Netherlands

Station Bussum Zuid
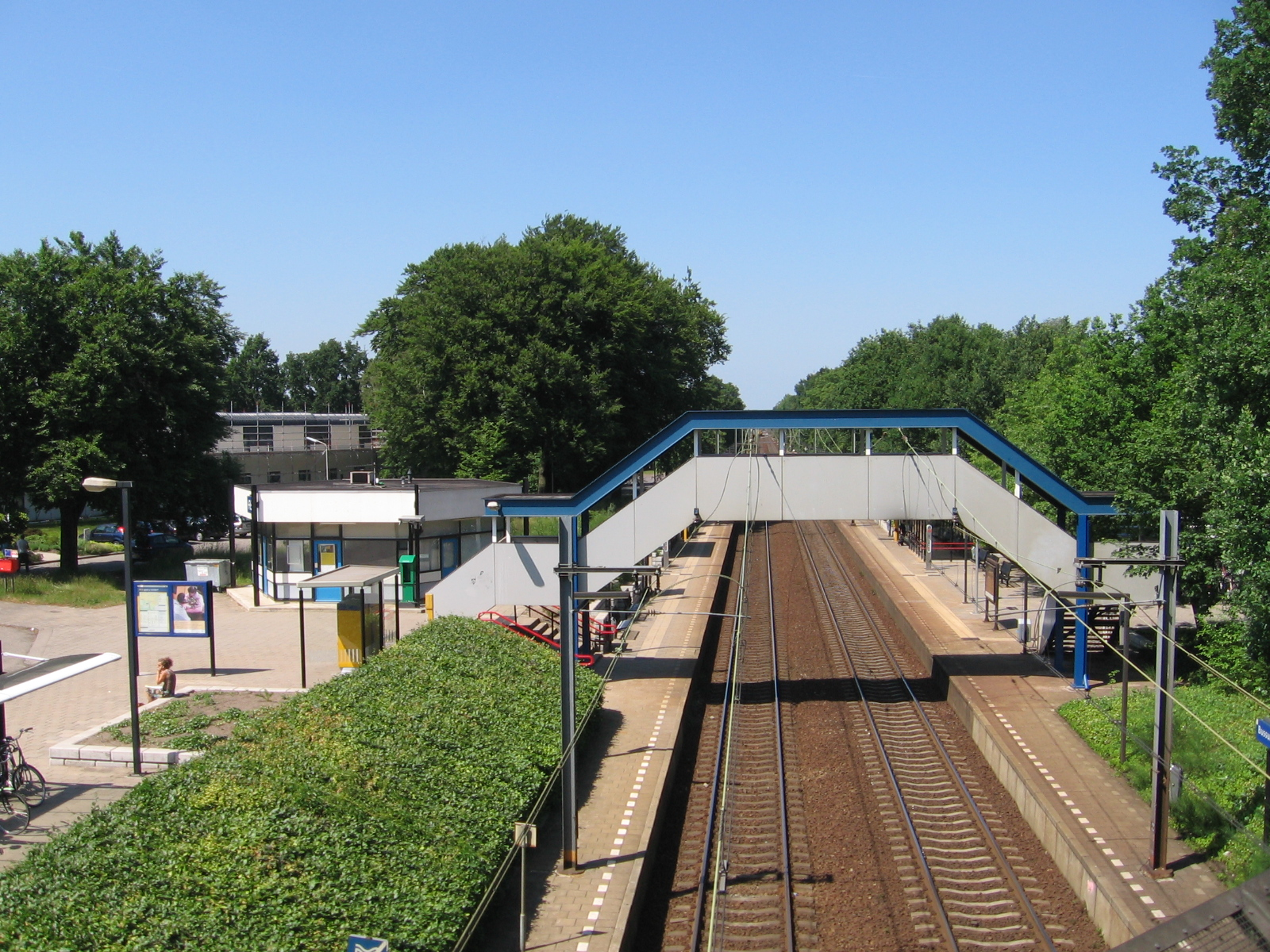

General information
- Location: Netherlands
- Coordinates: 52°15′56″N 5°9′46″E
- Line: Amsterdam–Zutphen railway

Other information
- Station code: Bsmz

History
- Opened: 22 May 1966

Services
Preceding station	Nederlandse Spoorwegen	Following station
Naarden-Bussum towards Leiden Centraal	NS Sprinter 5700 until 20:30	Hilversum Media Park towards Utrecht Centraal
Naarden-Bussum towards Amsterdam Centraal	NS Sprinter 5800	Hilversum Media Park towards Amersfoort Vathorst
Location
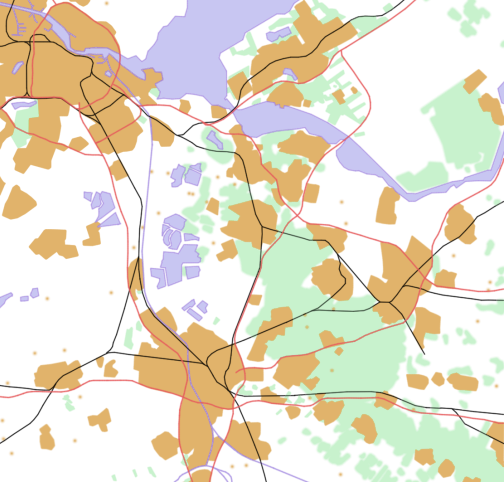
- Location within Northeastern Randstad

Bussum Zuid is a railway station located in Bussum, Netherlands. It is located approximately 25 km southeast of Amsterdam. It is on the Amsterdam - Hilversum - Amersfoort main line. The station was opened at 22 May 1966. The station is double tracked and has 2 platforms with many trains passing through, with 4 trains stopping per hour.

The platforms are connected by a traverse with a lift that was installed in 2015.

== Train services ==
The following train services call at Bussum Zuid:

- 2x per hour local service (sprinter) The Hague - Leiden - Hoofddorp - Schiphol - Duivendrecht - Hilversum - Utrecht
- 2x per hour local service (sprinter) Hoofddorp - Amsterdam - Hilversum - Amersfoort Vathorst

== Bus service ==
The station is served by one bus service.

Bus Service	Operator	From	To	Via	Frequency
Connexxion
109	Connexxion	Station Naarden-Bussum	Hilversum Station	Station Bussum Zuid, Crailo P+R, Laren, Eennes	2x per hour
