= Amsterdam–Zutphen railway =

Railway line in the Netherlands

Amsterdam–Zutphen railway Oosterspoorweg
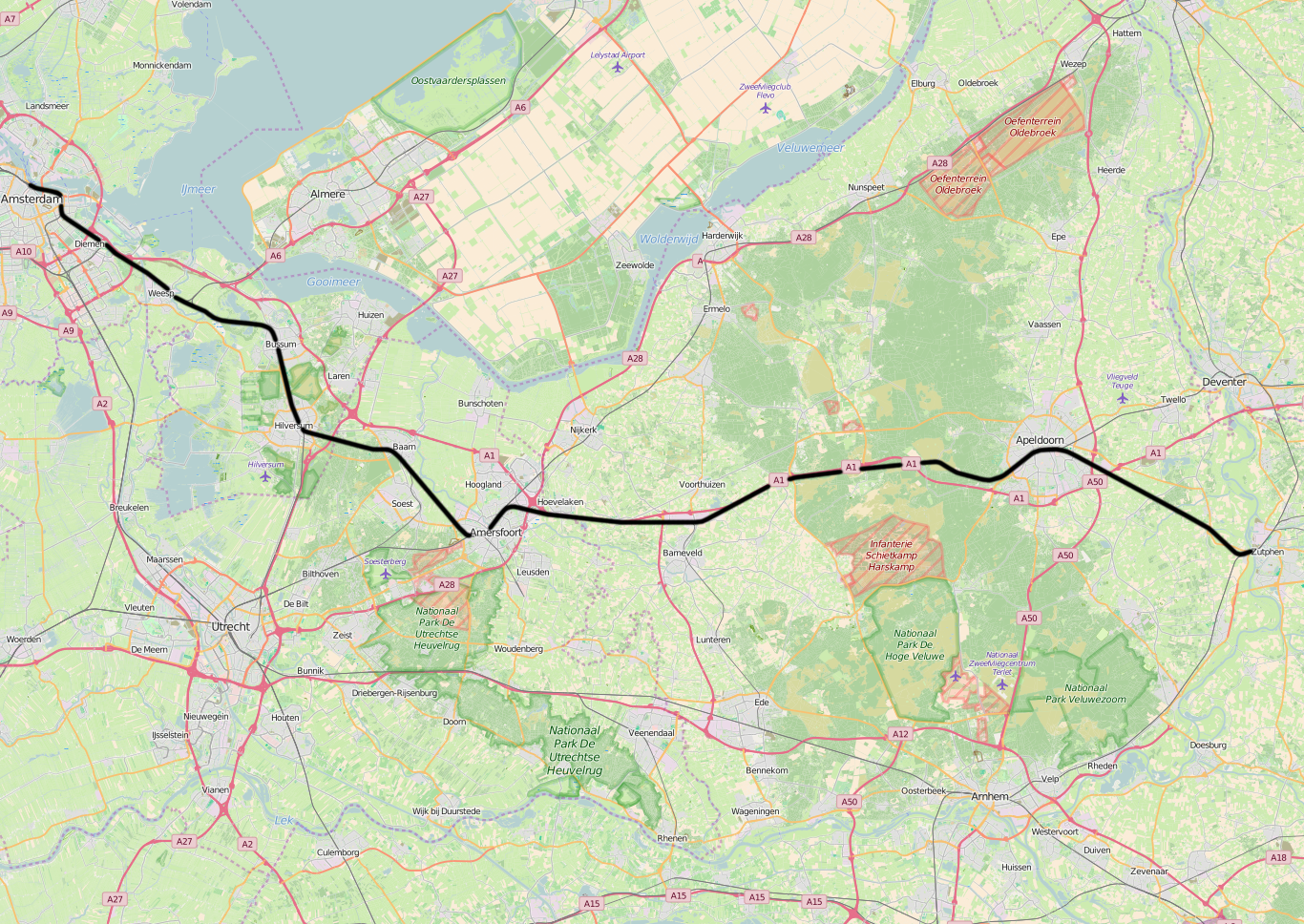

Overview
- Status: Operational
- Locale: Netherlands
- Termini: Amsterdam Centraal railway station; Zutphen railway station

Service
- Operator: Nederlandse Spoorwegen

History
- Opened: 1874–1876

Technical
- Line length: 106 km (66 mi)
- Number of tracks: Amsterdam–Apeldoorn double track, Apeldoorn–Zutphen single track
- Track gauge: 1,435 mm (4 ft 8 1/2 in) standard gauge
- Electrification: Amsterdam–Apeldoorn 1.5 kV DC; Apeldoorn–Zutphen not electrified

The Amsterdam–Zutphen railway is a railway line in the Netherlands running from Amsterdam, North Holland to Zutphen, Gelderland via the province of Utrecht. It passes through the cities of Hilversum, Amersfoort and Apeldoorn. It is also informally called the Oosterspoorweg (English: Eastern railway), with the part between Amsterdam and Amersfoort sometimes being called the Gooilijn (Gooi line) because of the region it runs through.

== History ==
The railway between Amsterdam and Amersfoort was opened by the Hollandsche IJzeren Spoorweg-Maatschappij in 1874 with the Amersfoort–Zutphen section opening in 1876. It was intended as an alternative connection between Amsterdam and the German border and competed with the Staatsspoor-run Amsterdam–Arnhem railway (Rhijnspoorweg).

== Route ==
The railway begins at Amsterdam Centraal. Between Amsterdam Centraal and just before Amsterdam Muiderpoort railway station, the railway is six tracks-wide; at Amsterdam Muiderpoort, two tracks diverge off towards Utrecht Centraal (Amsterdam–Arnhem railway). Through the eastern side of Amsterdam Muiderpoort, there are eight tracks towards Weesp – just two of these tracks are for trains calling at the station. South of this station, the railways goes back to six tracks as it crosses the Ringvaart. 500 metres east of Amsterdam Muiderpoort is the entrance to Watergraafsmeer rail depot; this is also the point where the Schiphol freight bridge is located. At this point, the line goes to two tracks. The view of the depot is not perfect from the railway. At the end of the depot the railway goes over the A10 ring road of Amsterdam. At Diemen station there is a short section of three-track railway, this stays as three tracks until just before Gaasperdammerweg Junction, before this point there is a single track line coming from Watergraafsmeer depot.

The railway line crosses the river Diem, then it becomes a four-track railway, with two tracks joining from Schiphol. Once the lines have all joined, the line continues as a 6-track section, crossing the A9. It then becomes a four-track section, crossing the Amsterdam-Rhine Canal with two large bridges side-by-side.

On the approaches of Weesp, an extra two tracks exist so that there are six tracks, with two tracks through the middle for passing trains. This is where passengers to Almere and Lelystad, Hilversum and Amersfoort, Amsterdam and Diemen and Schiphol and Duivendrecht would all change for destinations not served by their train. It reduces back to four tracks and then 2 km (1.2 mi) south of Weesp, the line splits, with the Flevolijn having two tracks branch off, where the line goes to Almere Centrum and Lelystad Centrum. The main line continues as a two-track section. The Gooiboog then joins on not far from the other Almere line.

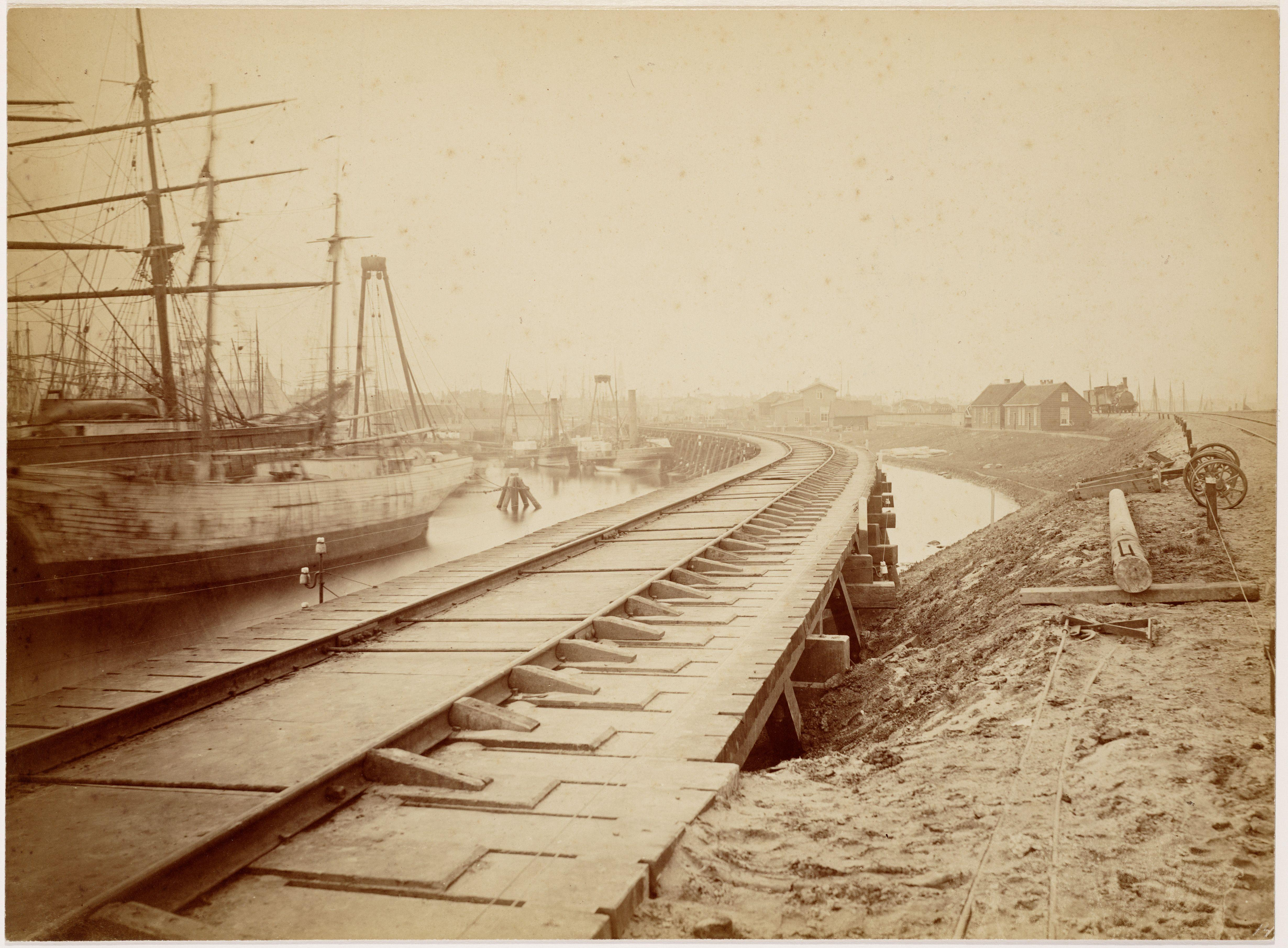
Amsterdam–Zutphen railway construction, c. 1874

The next station is Naarden-Bussum, which, until August 2019 used to have four tracks, with a single and an island platform. One outside line was used as a passing line only. After August 2019 the station has two tracks with two platforms opposite each other.

The next station is Bussum Zuid, which is a simple two-track station, with two platforms opposite each other. After the station, is the freight carriage works of Crailoo.

The next station is Hilversum Noord, again a simple two-track station, with two platforms opposite each other.

The next station is Hilversum, which is the main station between Amsterdam Centraal and Amersfoort. Here there are five tracks, the last two of which had platforms, which were finished in December 2007, to accommodate the Intercity trains. Immediately after the station is the junction with the line to Utrecht. This line used to go directly to Utrecht Lunetten, but the passenger services running via Utrecht Centraal. The line continues as a two-track section again.

The next station is Baarn, which has four tracks. This station layout was changed in December 2008, to three through tracks and one terminating from Soest direction. This continues as three tracks for about 400 m (1,300 ft) until the Stichtse lijn branches off to Soest and Utrecht.

Then the line continues as a double track section until approaching Amersfoort. Then come the yards of Amersfoort on both sides of the line. Then the main line joins the Utrecht–Kampen railway (Centraalspoorweg) from Utrecht. The station has ten tracks in total, consisting of three large island platforms. There is one passing line within the platforms and with three passing tracks at the northern part of the station. Access to the Leusden line is from platforms 1 and 2. The original Amersfoort line is just 200 m (660 ft) from the station by train. The station building is the only remnant of this.

Distance from Amsterdam Centraal station (km)	Point of interest
	From Amsterdam Sloterdijk station
0.0	Amsterdam Centraal, previously Amsterdam CS (1889–2000)
2	Rail siding Dijksgracht
	Doklijn, closed, no longer exists
3.5	Rhijnspoorweg To Utrecht, Eindhoven or Arnhem (Next Station Amsterdam Amstel)
4	Amsterdam Muiderpoort
	Depot Watergraafsmeer
	Amsterdam Science Park
	A10
7	Diemen, on the same location as the former halt Diemerbrug (1882–1913)
	Schiphollijn To Schiphol (Not Used By Passenger Trains)
	Gaasperdammerweg Junction, From Schiphol. (Next Station Diemen Zuid)
	A9
	Bridge over the Amsterdam-Rhine Canal
13	Weesp
	Bridge over the Vecht
15	Flevolijn To/From Almere and Lelystad (Next StationAlmere Muziekwijk)
22	Naarden-Bussum
24	Bussum Zuid
	Railpro Freight Works Centre Crailoo
27	Hilversum Media Park, previously called Hilversum NOS (1974–1989) and Hilversum Noord (1989–2013)
28	Hilversum
	Spoorlijn Hilversum-Lunetten to Utrecht Lunetten or Utrecht Centraal (Next Station Hilversum Sportpark
	A27
36	Baarn
	Stichtse lijn to Soest and Utrecht (Next Station Soestdijk)
	Rail sidings Amersfoort Bokkeduinen
	Centraalspoorweg From Utrecht (Previous Station Den Dolder)
45	Amersfoort, previously called Amersfoort aansluiting (1889–1902)
45.5	Freight Line to Leusden, previously ran to Kesteren, see Amersfoort for more details. Ponlijn, Freight Only.
46	Amersfoort NCS railway station (closed)
