= Naarden-Bussum railway station =

Railway station in the Netherlands

Naarden-Bussum
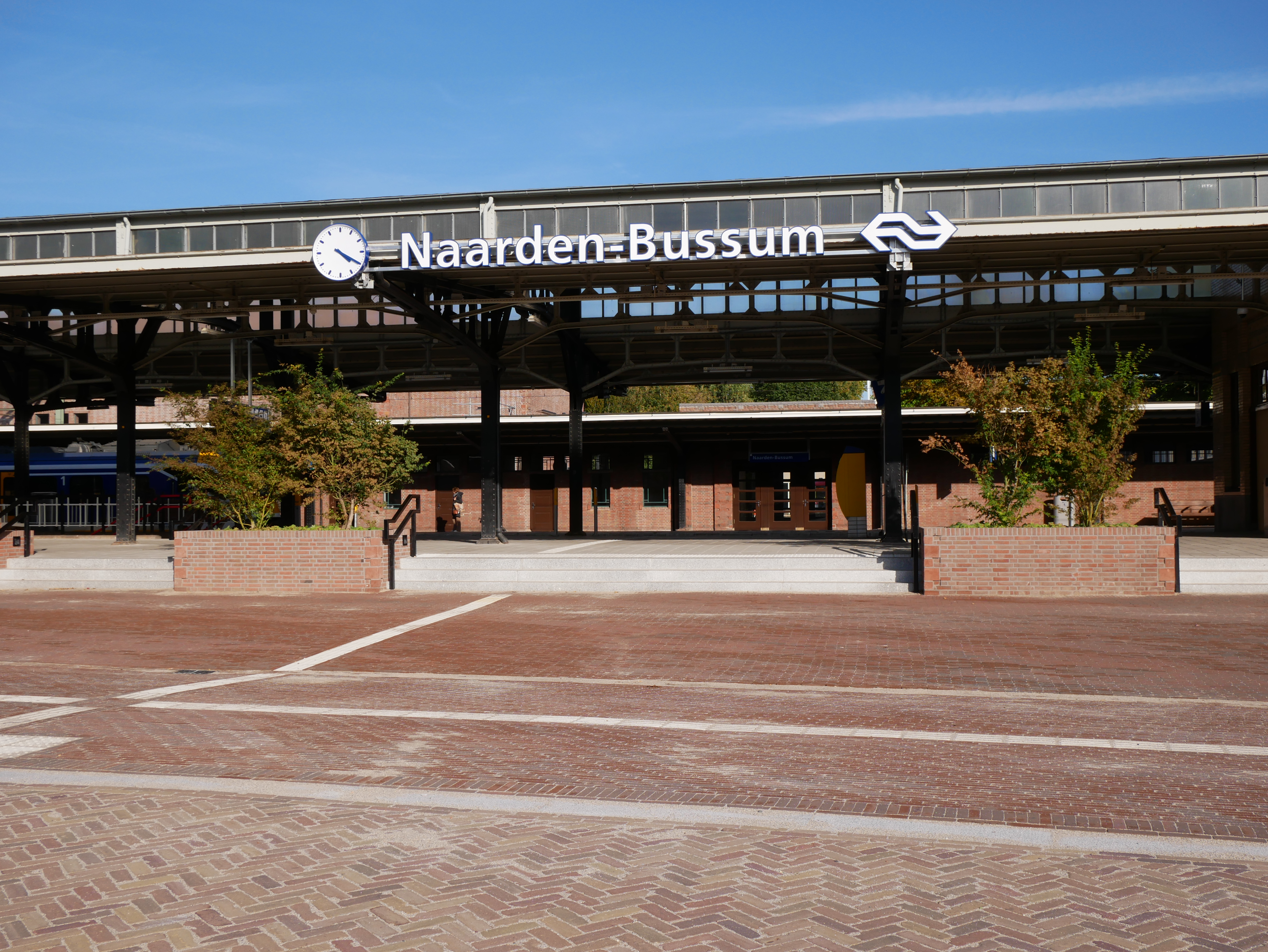

General information
- Location: Bussum; Netherlands
- Coordinates: 52°16′50″N 5°9′26″E
- Line: Amsterdam–Zutphen railway

Other information
- Station code: Ndb

Services
Preceding station	Nederlandse Spoorwegen	Following station
Almere Poort towards Almere Centrum	NS Sprinter 4900	Hilversum towards Utrecht Centraal
Weesp towards Leiden Centraal	NS Sprinter 5700 Until 20:30	Bussum Zuid towards Utrecht Centraal
Weesp towards Amsterdam Centraal	NS Sprinter 5800	Bussum Zuid towards Amersfoort Vathorst
Location
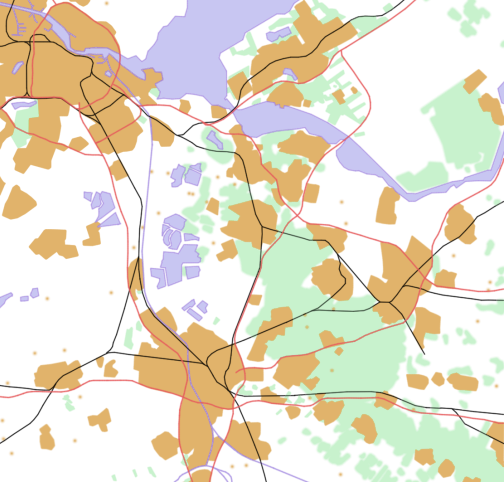
- Location within Northeastern Randstad

Naarden-Bussum is a railway station in the north of Bussum, Netherlands that also serves the neighboring community of Naarden. The station has two standard platforms. It has a total of two tracks. The station was opened on 10 June 1874. The station is on the Amsterdam - Hilversum - Amersfoort line, known as the Gooilijn. The station was also used as a tram station for the Bussum - Huizen tram service from 1883 to 1958.

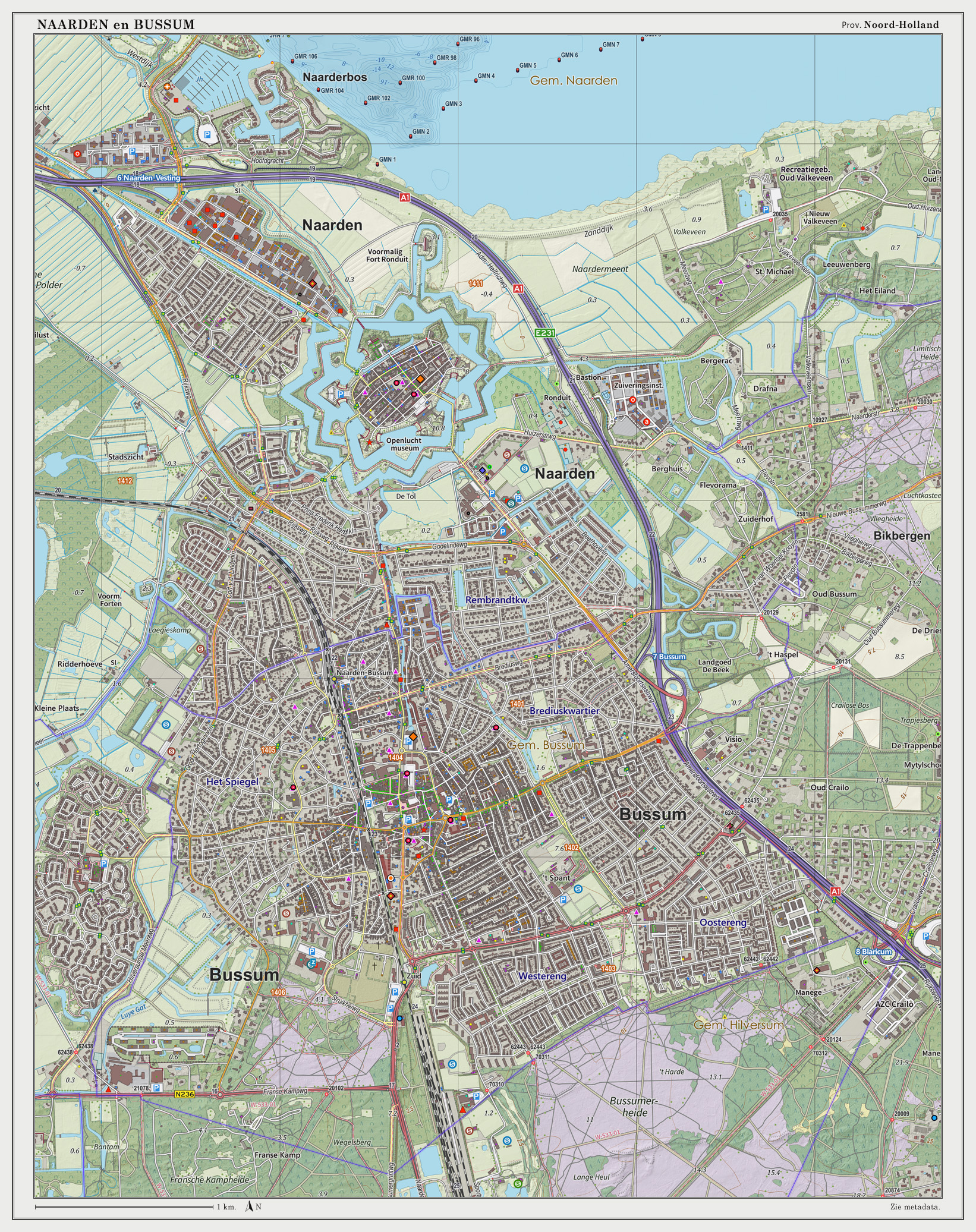
Dutch topographic map of Naarden and Bussum, 2014

== Train services ==
The following train services call at Naarden-Bussum:

- 2x per hour local service (sprinter) Utrecht Central - Hilversum - Almere Centrum (not stopping at Bussum Zuid, Hilversum Media Park and Hollandsche Rading)
- 2x per hour local service (sprinter) Hoofddorp - Schiphol Airport - Duivendrecht - Hilversum - Utrecht
- 2x per hour local service (sprinter) (Hoofddorp) - Amsterdam - Hilversum - Amersfoort Vathorst

== Bus services ==
The following bus services call at Station Naarden-Bussum. These depart from the bus station at the front of the station.

Bus Service	Operator	From	To	Via	Frequency	Notes
Transdev
100	Transdev	Station Naarden-Bussum	Huizen/Station Hilversum Sportpark (during rush hour)	Bussum, Naarden, Huizen, Blaricum, Hilversum	2-4x per hour	Non Stop between Blaricum and Hilversum
5	Transdev	Station Naarden-Bussum	Station Hilversum	Bussum, Hilversumse Meent, 's Graveland, Hilversum	2x per hour, 1x per hour (evenings).	
109	Transdev	Station Naarden-Bussum	Station Hilversum	Bussum, Laren, Eemnes, Baarn, Hilversum	1-2x per hour	
110	Transdev	Station Naarden-Bussum	Station Weesp	Muiden, Muiderberg, Naarden	1x per hour	

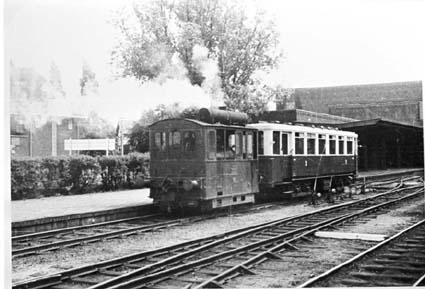
A tram in 1940 at Naarden-Bussum
