= Hilversum railway station =

Railway station in Hilversum, Netherlands

Station Hilversum
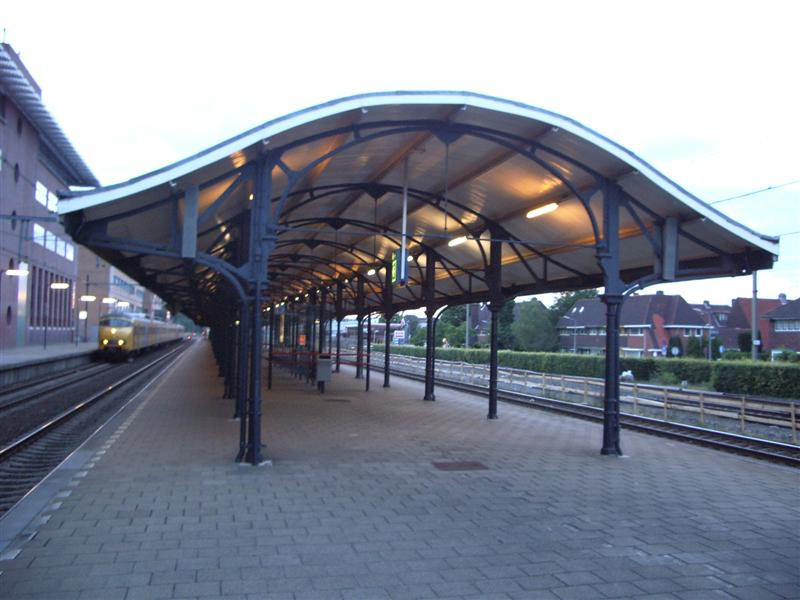

General information
- Location: Netherlands
- Coordinates: 52°13′37″N 5°10′50″E
- Lines: Amsterdam–Zutphen railway Hilversum–Lunetten railway

Other information
- Station code: Hvs

History
- Opened: 10 June 1874; 152 years ago 1992; 34 years ago (current building)

Services
Preceding station	DB Fernverkehr	Following station
Amsterdam Centraal Terminus	ICE 77	Amersfoort Centraal towards Berlin Ostbahnhof
Preceding station	Nederlandse Spoorwegen	Following station
Amsterdam Centraal Terminus	NS Intercity 1500	Amersfoort Centraal towards Deventer
Duivendrecht towards Breda	NS Intercity Direct 1800	Amersfoort Centraal towards Amersfoort Schothorst
Naarden-Bussum towards Almere Centrum	NS Sprinter 4900	Hilversum Sportpark towards Utrecht Centraal
Hilversum Media Park towards Leiden Centraal	NS Sprinter 5700 Until 20:30	Hilversum Sportpark towards Utrecht Centraal
Hilversum Media Park towards Amsterdam Centraal	NS Sprinter 5800	Baarn towards Amersfoort Vathorst
Location
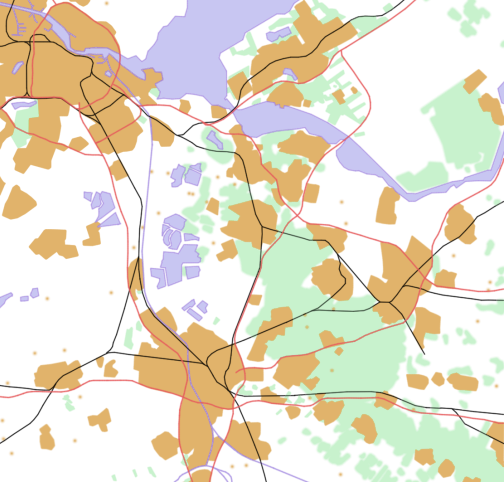
- Location within Northeastern Randstad

Hilversum is a railway station in Hilversum, Netherlands. It is located approximately 28 kilometres (17 mi) southeast of Amsterdam. It located on the Amsterdam Centraal station – Amersfoort station part of the Amsterdam–Zutphen railway, with a branch to Utrecht Centraal station. There are two other stations in Hilversum: Hilversum Media Park to the north, and Hilversum Sportpark to the south.

== History ==
The station opened on 10 June 1874. The station was situated on the so-called Gooilijn, part of the Amsterdam–Zutphen railway. Other connections were added later. The current building was constructed in 1992 and, apart from the railway station, it used to also houses offices of the regional Tax and Customs Administration. These have been replaced by offices of Transdev, BrightBlue, PareX Parts Exchange and other companies.

Intercity services at Hilversum were suspended in 1995. After constructing extra platforms, intercity services were resumed on 10 December 2007. All passing passenger trains now call at Hilversum.

== Train services ==
The following train services call at Hilversum:

- 7 daily intercity services Amsterdam - Amersfoort - Hengelo - Osnabrück - Hanover - Berlin
- 1x per hour intercity services Schiphol - Amersfoort - Hengelo - Enschede
- 1x per hour intercity service Schiphol - Hilversum - Amersfoort Schothorst
- 2x per hour intercity service Enkhuizen - Hoorn - Amsterdam - Hilversum - Amersfoort (- Deventer)
- 2x per hour local service (sprinter) Utrecht - Hilversum - Almere
- 2x per hour local service (sprinter) The Hague - Leiden - Hoofddorp - Schiphol - Duivendrecht - Hilversum - Utrecht
- 2x per hour local service (sprinter) Hoofddorp - Schiphol - Amsterdam - Hilversum - Amersfoort

== Bus services ==
=== Local bus lines ===
Line	Route	Operator	Notes
1	Hilversum Station - Centrum (Downtown) - Kerkelanden	Connexxion	
2	Hilversum Station - Over 't Spoor - Erfgooiers	Connexxion	
3	Hilversum Station - Hilversum Sportpark Station - Tergooi Ziekenhuis (Hospital)	Connexxion	

=== Regional bus lines ===
Line	Route	Operator	Notes
58	Hilversum Station - Hollandsche Rading - Maartensdijk - Bilthoven - De Built - Zeist	U-OV and Pouw Vervoer	Mon-Sat during daytime hours only. U-OV operates this route during weekdays, Pouw Vervoer on Saturdays.
59	Hilversum Station - Lage Vuursche - Den Dolder - Huis ter Heide - Zeist	U-OV and Pouw Vervoer	Mon-Sat during daytime hours only. U-OV operates this route during weekdays, Pouw Vervoer on Saturdays.
70	Amersfoort Station - Soest Zuid - Soest Overhees - Soestdijk Noord - Hooge Vuursche - Hilversum Station	Syntus Utrecht; a few runs are operated by Pouw Vervoer and Van Kooten	
100	(Hilversum Station -) Blaricum Bijvanck - Huizen - Naarden-Bussum Station	Connexxion	The route between Hilversum and Blaricum is only served during weekday daytime hours.
104	Hilversum Station - Hilversum-Zuid - Nieuw-Loosdrecht	Connexxion	
105	Hilversum Station - Kortenhoef - 's-Graveland - Hilversumse Meent - Naarden-Bussum Station	Connexxion	
106	(Hilversum Station - Kortenhoef -) Nederhorst den Berg - Weesp Station	Connexxion	Mon-Sat only. Only runs through from Nederhorst den Berg to Hilversum Mon-Fri during daytime hours.
107	Hilversum Station - Hilversum Mediapark - Bussum - Blaricum Ziekenhuis (Hospital)	Connexxion	
108	Hilversum Station - Laren - Blaricum Dorp - Huizen	Connexxion	
109	Hilversum Station - Eemnes - Laren - Blaricum Ziekenhuis (Hospital) - Naarden-Bussum Station	Connexxion	
121	Hilversum Station - Oud-Loosdrecht - Loenen aan de Vecht - Vinkeveen - Wilnis - Mijdrecht	Syntus Utrecht	Mon-Sat during daytime hours only. Only runs between Hilversum and Vinkeveen, Groenlandsekade on Saturdays.
320	Hilversum Station - Hilversum Arenapark - Blaricum Bijvanck - Huizen - Blaricum Ziekenhuis (Hospital) - Naarden Gooimeer - Muiden P+R - Amsterdam Amstel Station	Connexxion and Pouw Vervoer	During weekday daytime hours, Saturday mornings and Sunday evenings, some buses only run between Hilversum and Huizen. During morning rush hours, 4 extra buses run between Hilversum Station and Hilversum Arenapark.
N32	Hilversum Station → Eemnes → Blaricum Bijvanck → Huizen	Pouw Vervoer	Only runs during Saturday late nights (between midnight and 5 AM).
