= Bussum =

- Town and former municipality
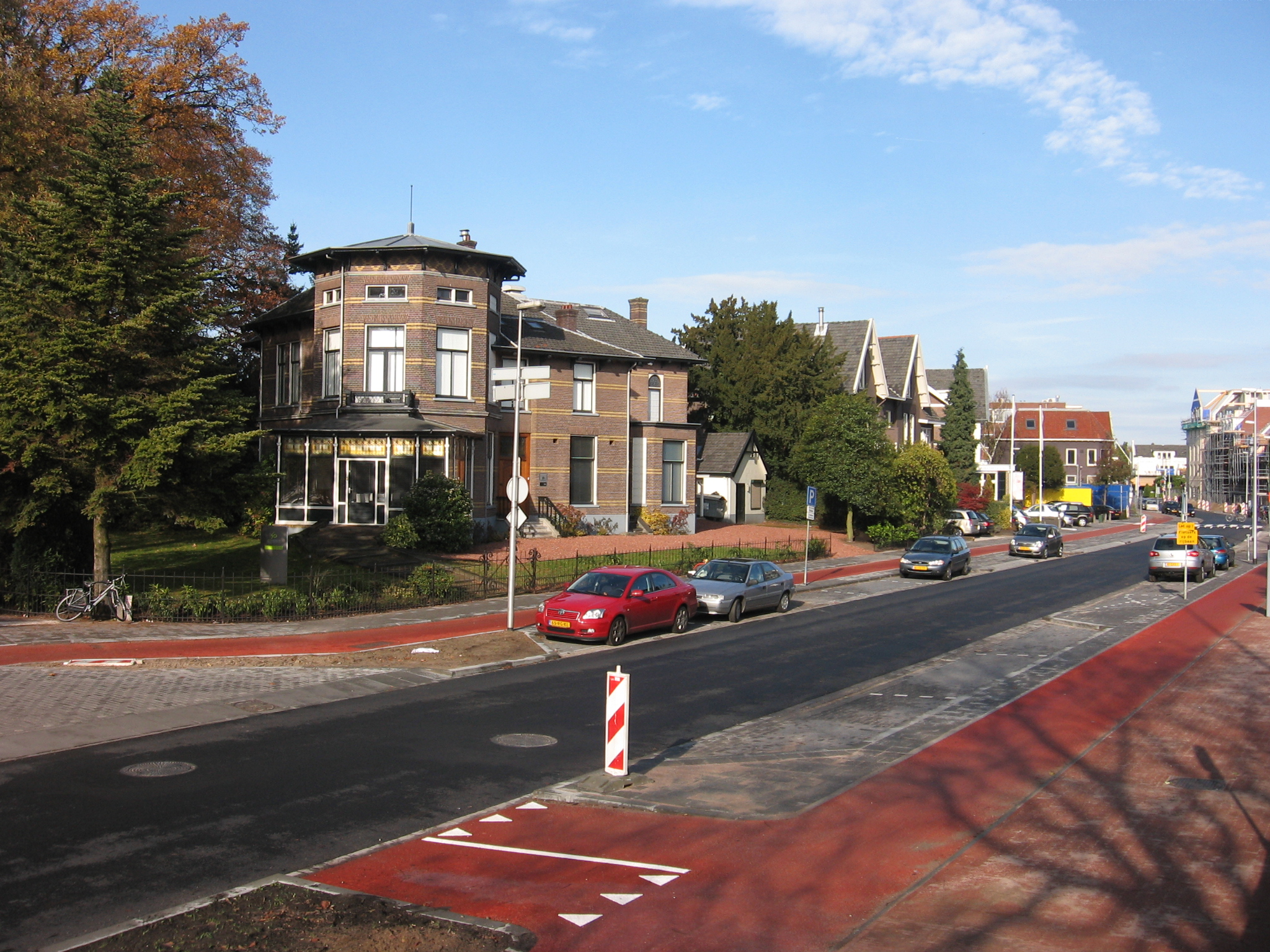
- Bussum across from city hall

- Flag Coat of arms

- Location in North Holland
- Coordinates: 52°17′N 5°10′E
- Country: Netherlands
- Province: North Holland
- Municipality: Gooise Meren

Area
  - Total: 8.15 km^{2} (3.15 sq mi)
  - Land: 8.09 km^{2} (3.12 sq mi)
  - Water: 0.06 km^{2} (0.023 sq mi)
- Elevation: 1 m (3.3 ft)

Population (2019)
  - Total: 33,595
  - Density: 4,150/km^{2} (10,800/sq mi)
- Demonym: Bussumer
- Time zone: UTC+1 (CET)
  - Summer (DST): UTC+2 (CEST)
- Postcode: 1400–1406
- Area code: 035
- Website: www.bussum.nl

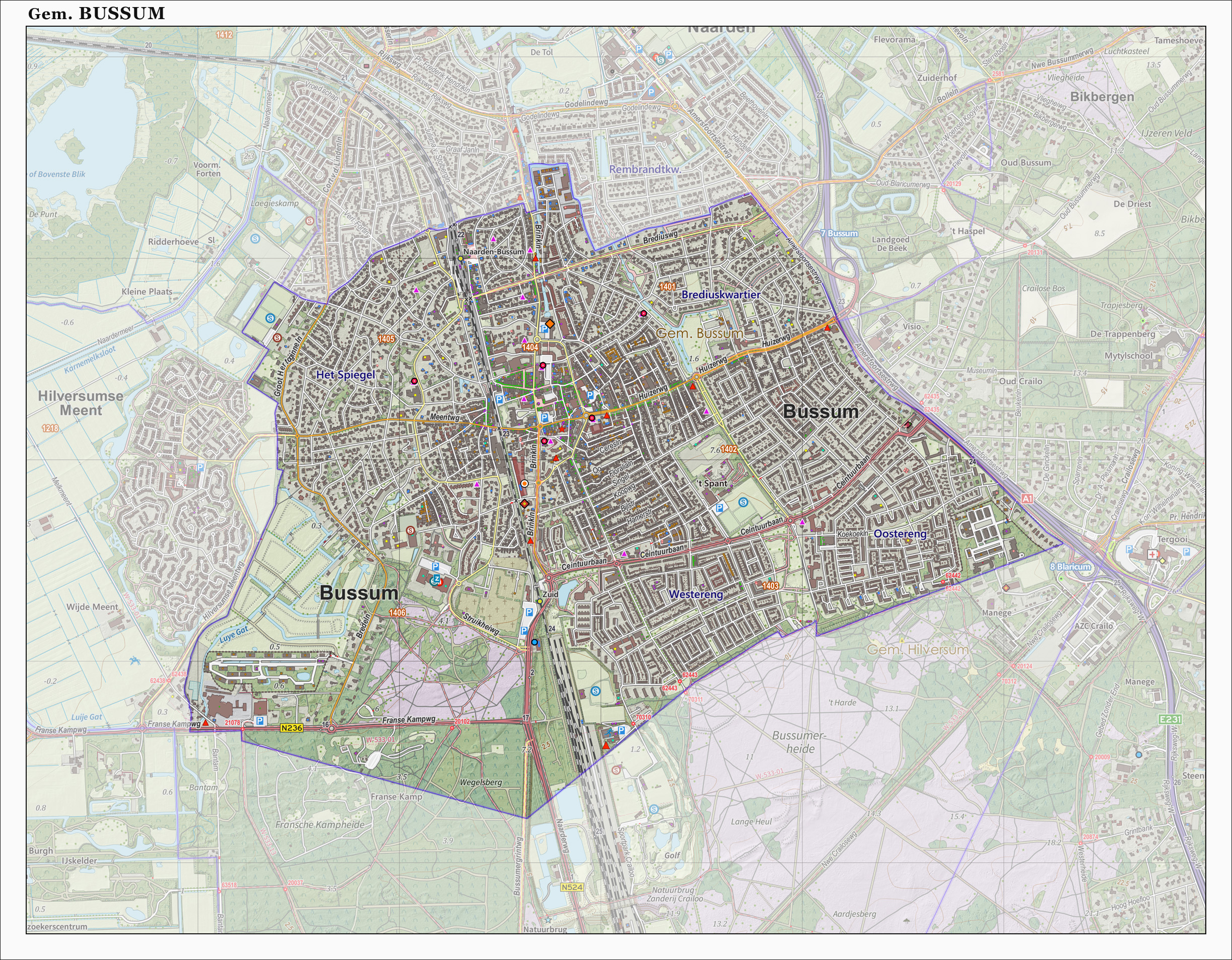
Map of the former municipality of Bussum, June 2015

Bussum (Dutch pronunciation: [ˈbʏsʏm]) is a commuter town to the east of Amsterdam, and former municipality in the Gooi region in the south east of the province of North Holland in the Netherlands near Hilversum. Since 2016, Bussum has been part of the new municipality of Gooise Meren.

Bussum had a population of 33,595 in 2019 and covered an area of 8.15 km^{2} (3.15 sq mi).

== History ==
For a long time Bussum was a hamlet situated in the heathlands of the Gooi and was first mentioned in 1306. At this time, Bussum was shown on maps as a large heathland with many small farms, sheep pens and forests. Since Bussum was situated near the fortified town of Naarden it was governed by Naarden from 1369. In 1470 Bussum had about 250 inhabitants, which made it the smallest village in the Gooi.

Bussum became independent from Naarden in 1817, yet it was not until the arrival of a railway line in 1874 that Bussum began to flourish. Two train stations were built in the town, that still exist today: Naarden-Bussum and Bussum Zuid (Dutch for Bussum South), both on the connection between Amsterdam and Hilversum. The stations and the road network fostered the town's status as a satellite town of Amsterdam, allowing for reverse commute also to Hilversum. From 1898 until 1907, Bussum housed the first Dutch socialist colony after the example of Thoreau's Walden, set up by the writer and psychiatrist Frederik van Eeden. In 1951, Bussum hosted the first Dutch national TV broadcast and the national TV studios were located there until 1964.

Bussum merged with the local municipalities of Naarden, Muiden and Muiderberg on 1 January 2016. In October 2014, the combined town councils chose the name Gooise Meren for the new municipality, the other options being Naarden-Bussum and Naardingerland.

== Local government ==
The last municipal council of Bussum consisted of 23 seats, which at the 2014 election were divided as follows:

- VVD - 5 seats
- List nr 6 (blank list) - 5 seats
- D66 - 4 seats
- PvdA - 3 seats
- CDA - 2 seats
- GroenLinks - 2 seats
- Gooise Ouderen Partij - 2 seats

Elections were held in November 2015 for a council for the new merged Gooise Meren municipality that commenced work in January 2016, replacing Bussum council.

== Notable residents ==
- Freddy Wittop (1911–2001), international costume designer
- Karel Thole (1914–2000), painter and illustrator
- Paul Biegel (1925–2006), author
- Willem Duys (1928–2011), radio and television presenter and record producer
- Thierry Veltman (1939–2023), artist
- Tineke Lagerberg (born 1941), swimmer
- Ronnie Tober (born 1945), singer and entertainer
- Charles de Lint (born 1951), Canadian author and musician
- Huub Rothengatter (born 1954), racing driver
- Raoul Heertje (born 1963), comedian
- Anneloes Nieuwenhuizen (born 1963), field hockey defender
- Ruud Hesp (born 1965), football goalkeeper
- Ellen Elzerman (born 1971), swimmer
- Thekla Reuten (born 1975), actress
- Wopke Hoekstra (born 1975), Dutch politician
- Joël Drommel (born 1996), football goalkeeper

== Transport ==
The town of Bussum has two railway stations: Naarden-Bussum and Bussum Zuid.
