= Den Dolder–Baarn railway =

Railway line in Utrecht, Netherlands

Den Dolder–Baarn railway Stichtse lijn
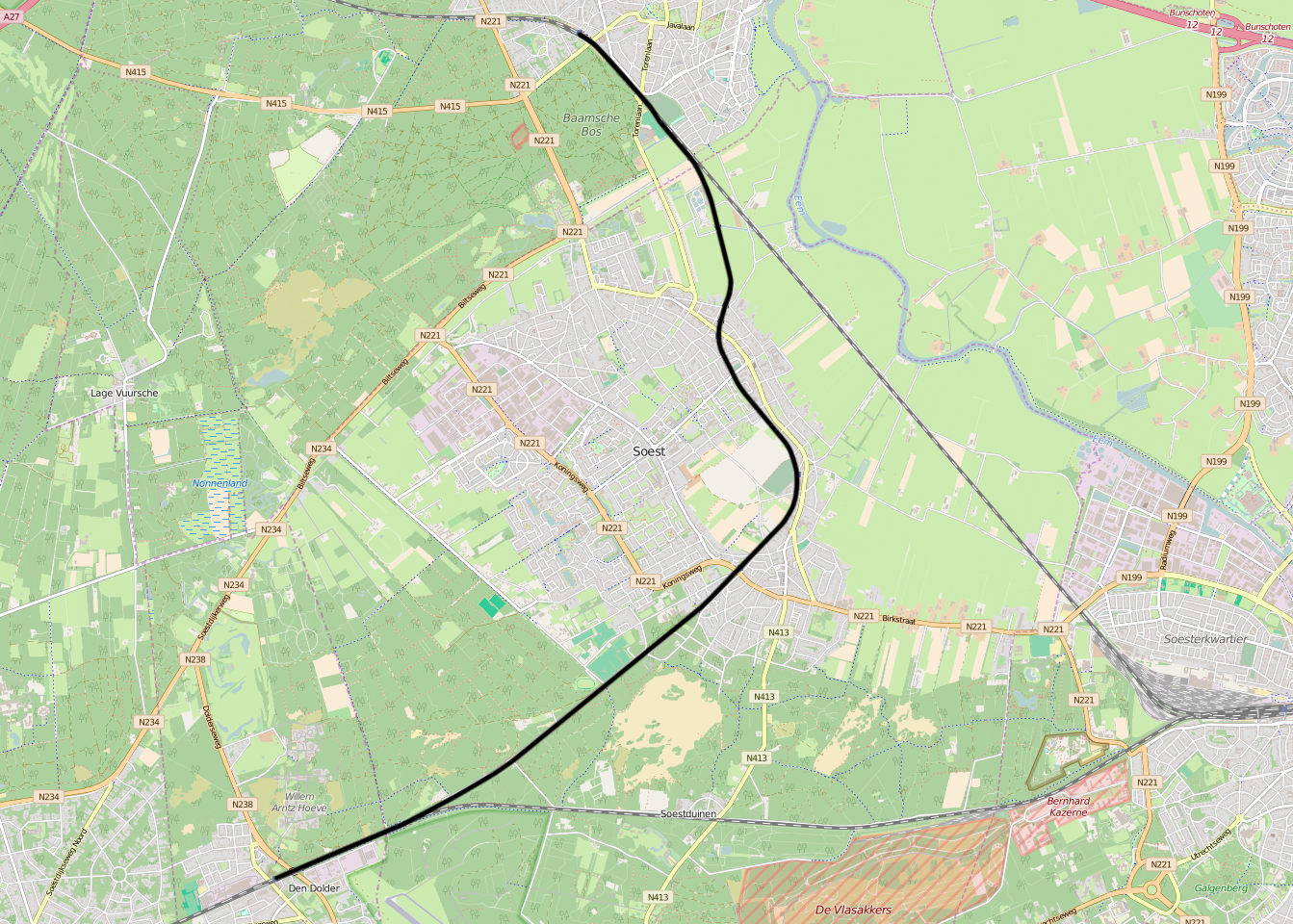

Overview
- Status: Operational
- Locale: Utrecht, Netherlands
- Termini: Den Dolder railway station 52.1402°N 5.2421°E; Baarn railway station 52.2082°N 5.2820°E

Service
- Operator(s): Nederlandse Spoorwegen

History
- Opened: 27 June 1898

Technical
- Line length: 10.7 km (6.6 mi)
- Number of tracks: Single track
- Track gauge: 1,435 mm (4 ft 8 1/2 in) standard gauge
- Electrification: 1.5 kV DC

The Den Dolder–Baarn railway is a railway line in the province of Utrecht, Netherlands running from Den Dolder to Baarn, passing through Soest. It is also called the Sticht Line (Dutch: Stichtse lijn). Opened in 1898 in order to link Baarn with the city of Utrecht, it is operated by Nederlandse Spoorwegen and belongs to ProRail.

The railway line is 11 km long and was electrified in 1948. The line is single track, with a passing place at Soest station. The line has 5 stations: Den Dolder, Soest Zuid, Soest, Soestdijk and Baarn. There used to be two more stations on the line: De Paltz (1898-1933) and Baan Buurtstation (1898-1948), the original terminus of this line. After the line was electrified, the line was extended to the other existing Baarn station (which has been the current terminus of this line ever since).

== Service ==
Currently one service operates over the line:

Series	Type	Route	Material	Frequency
5500	Stoptrein	Baarn – Soestdijk – Soest – Soest Zuid – Den Dolder – Bilthoven – Utrecht Overvecht – Utrecht Centraal	SNG	2x per hour

== Gallery ==
Den Dolder–Baarn railway stations

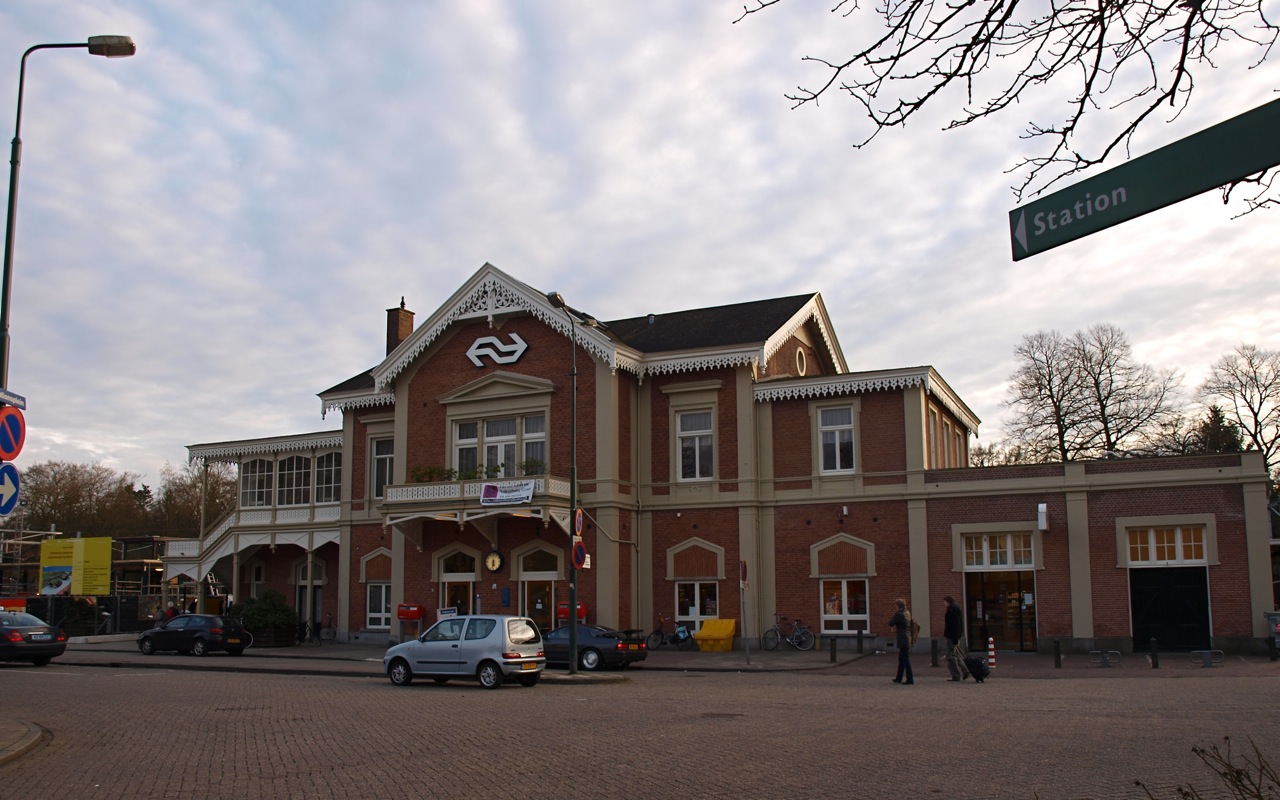
Baarn

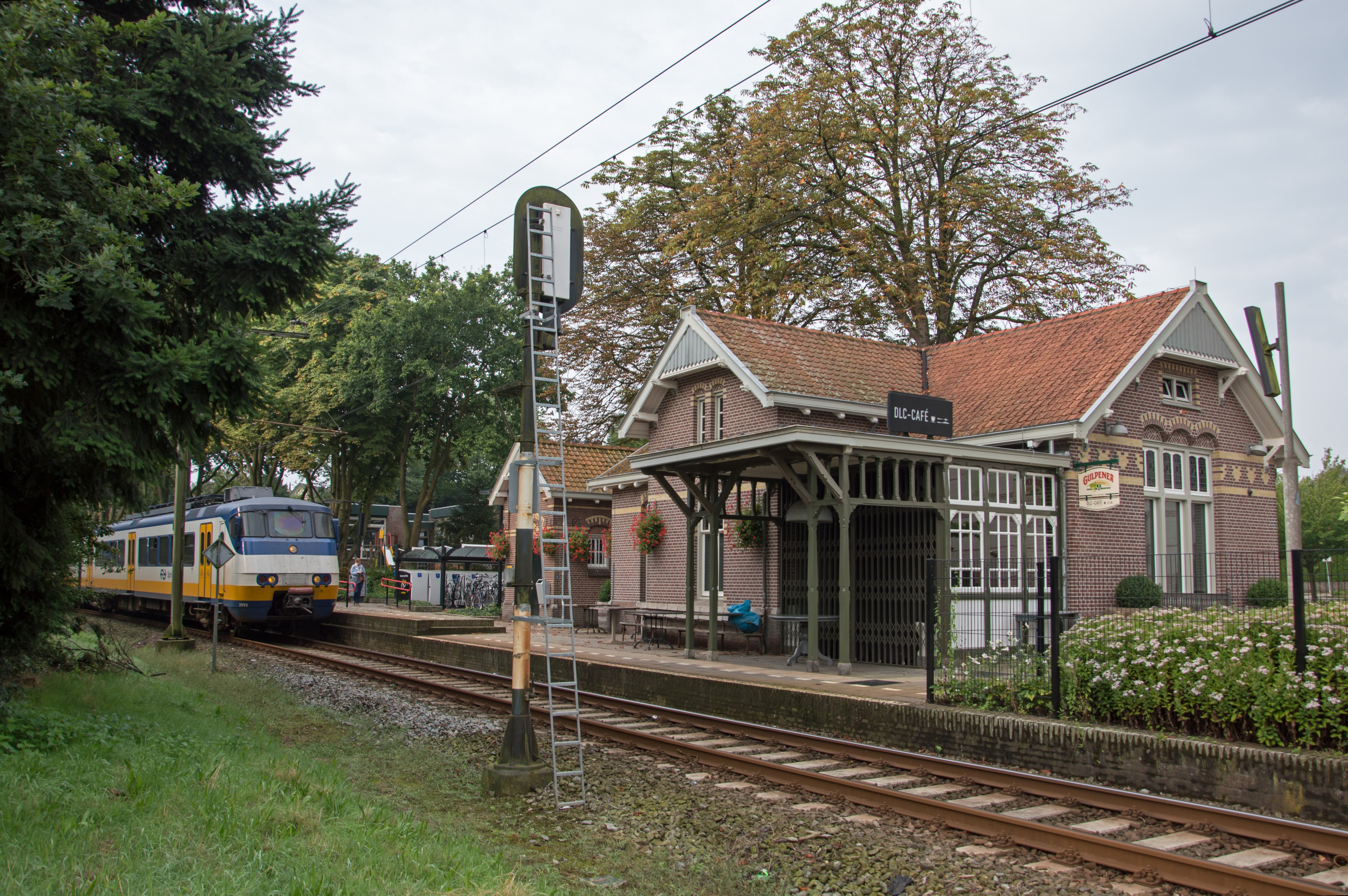
Soestdijk

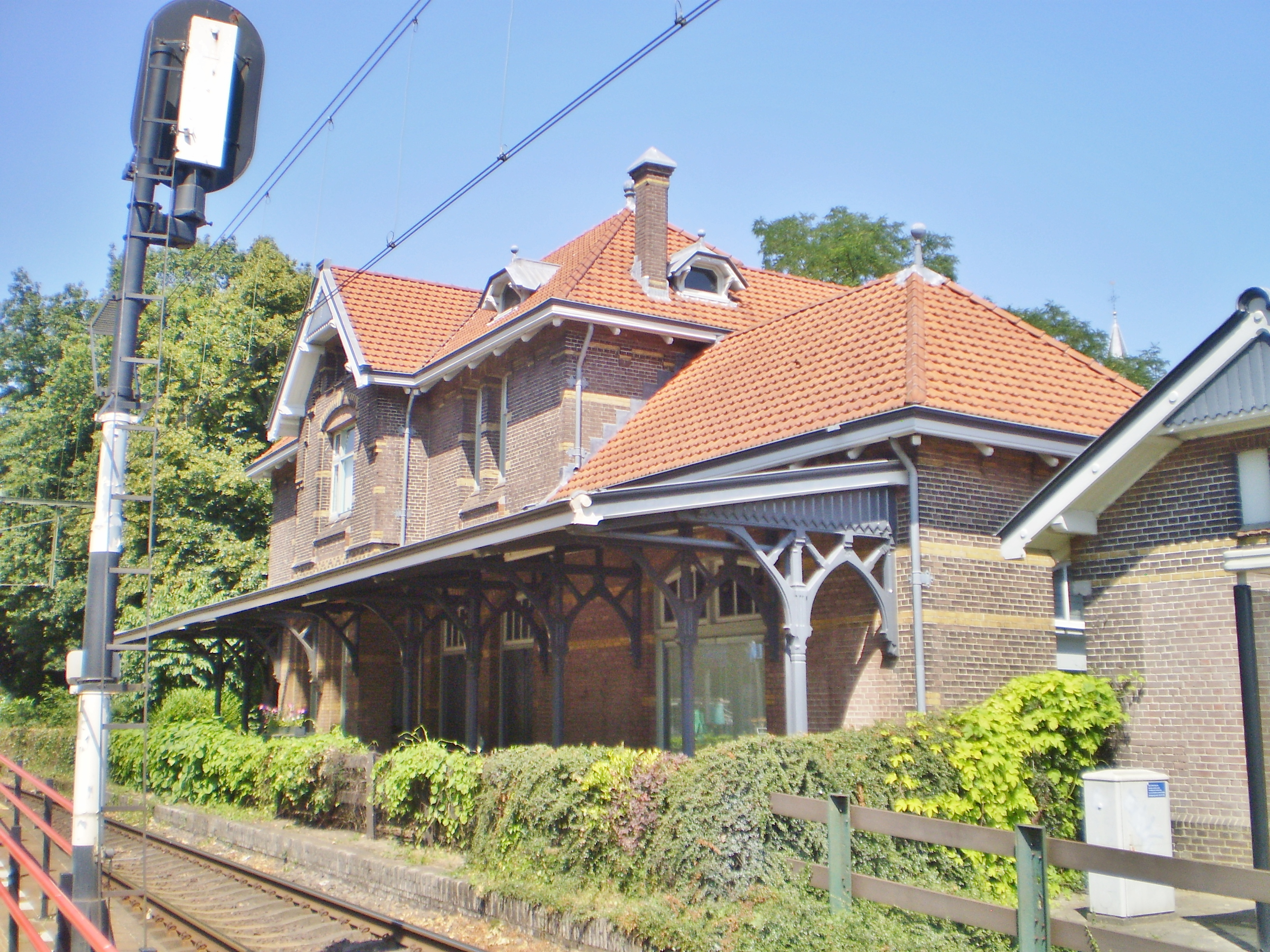
Soest

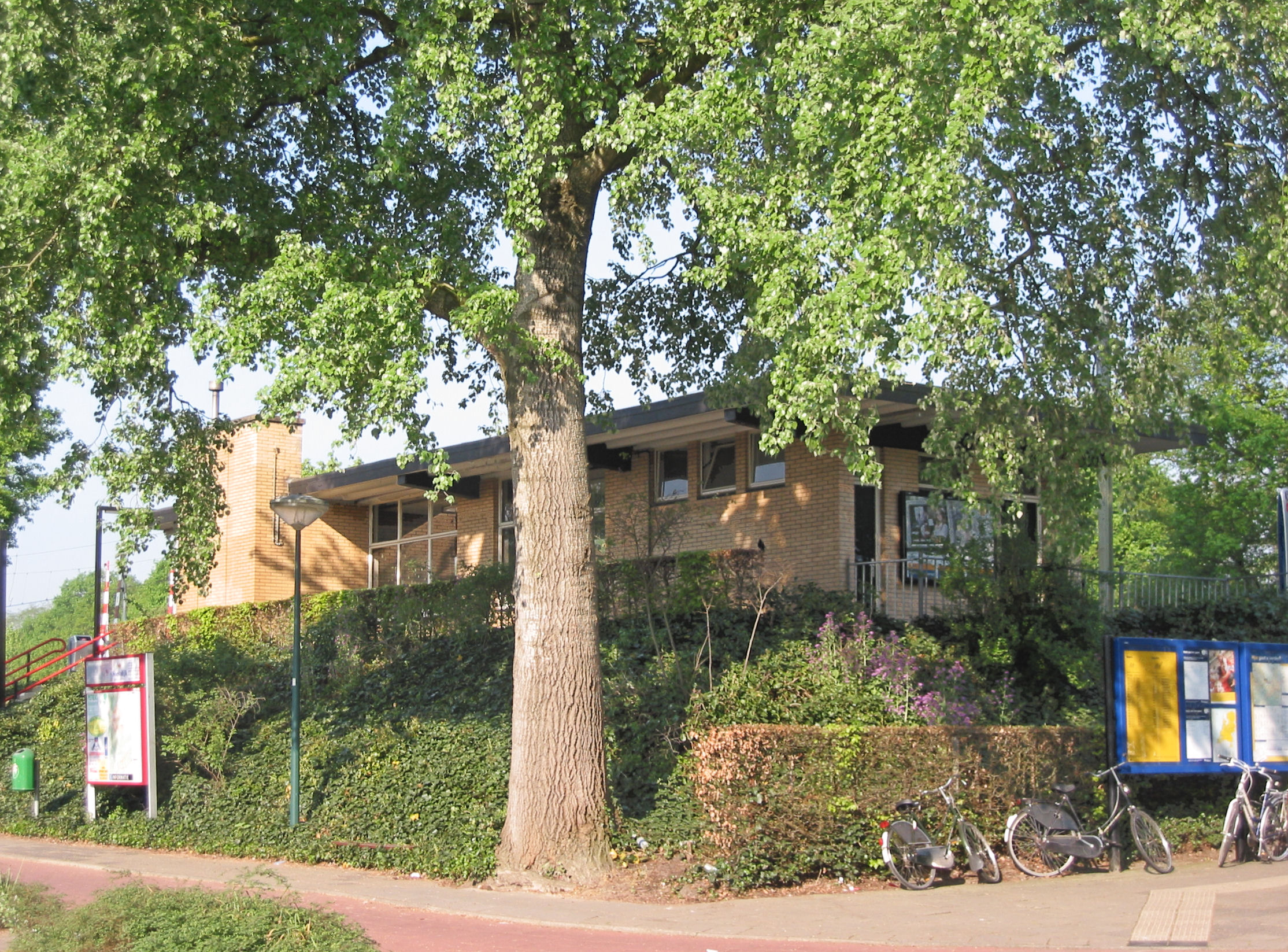
Soest Zuid

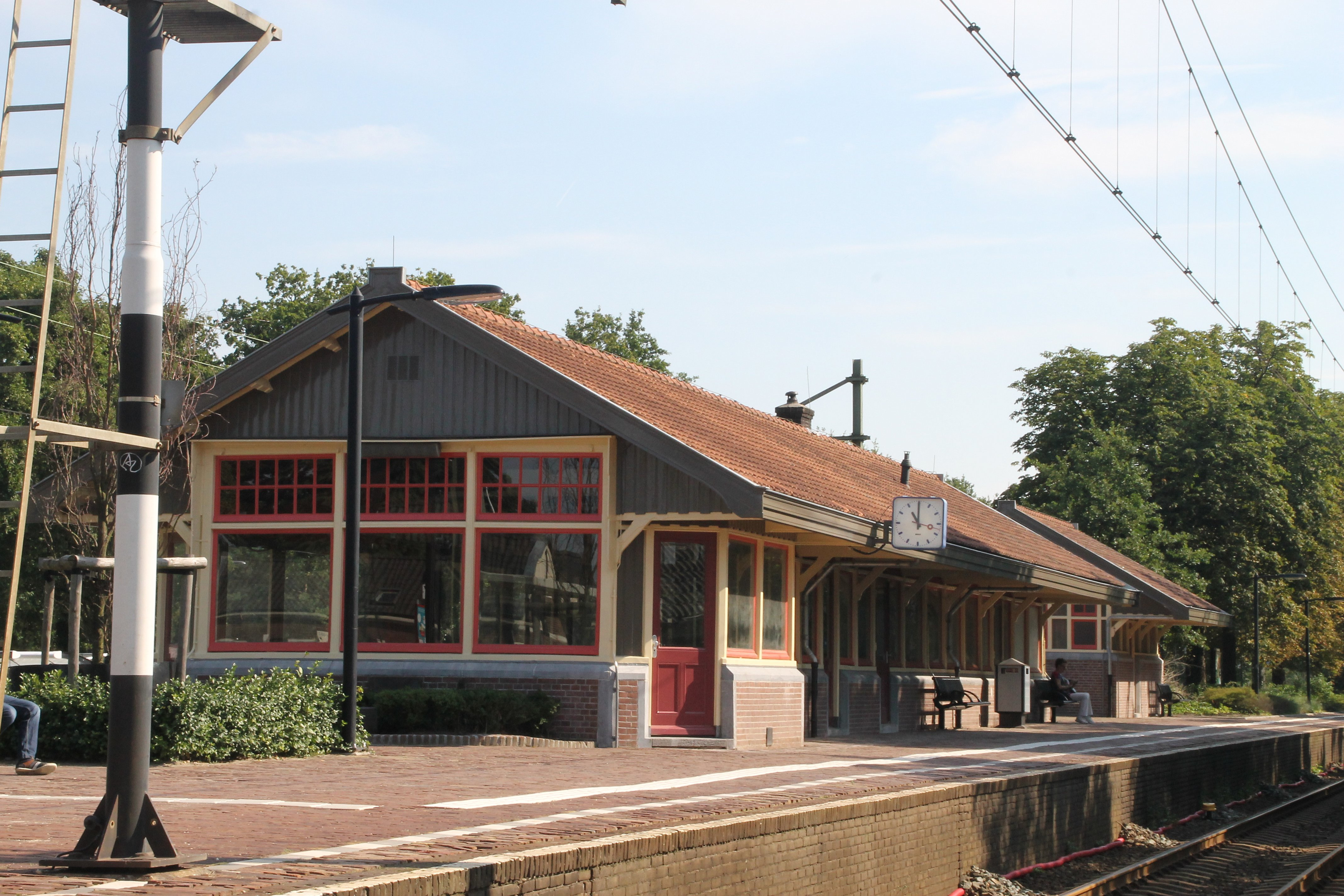
Den Dolder
