= Soest railway station =

Soest railway station may refer to

- Soest (Germany) station
- Soest (Netherlands) railway station
