= Den Dolder railway station =

Railway station in Den Dolder, Netherlands

Den Dolder
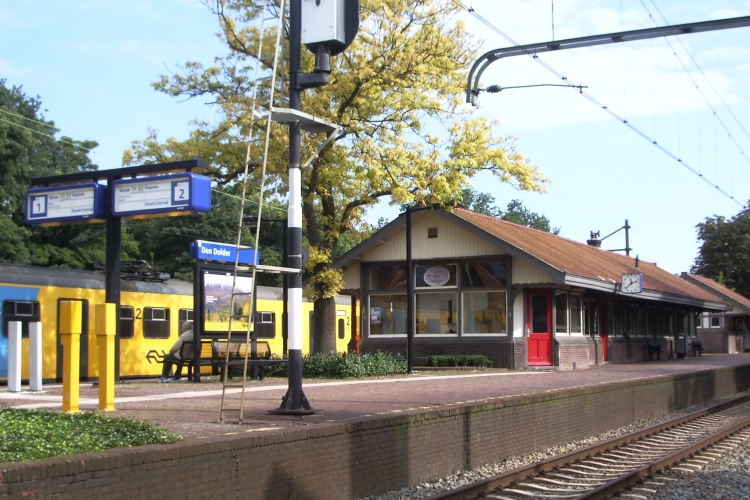

General information
- Location: Den Dolder, Netherlands
- Coordinates: 52°8′24″N 5°14′29″E
- Lines: Utrecht–Kampen railway Den Dolder–Baarn railway

History
- Opened: 1895, 1914 (current form)

Services
Preceding station	Nederlandse Spoorwegen	Following station
Bilthoven towards Utrecht Centraal	NS Sprinter 5500	Soest Zuid towards Baarn
Bilthoven towards Utrecht Centraal	NS Sprinter 5600	Amersfoort towards Zwolle
Location
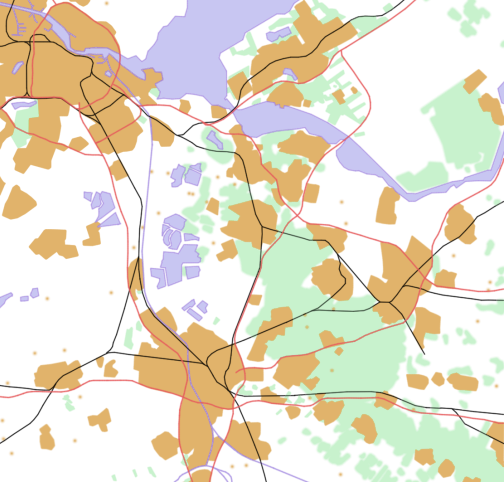
- Location within Northeastern Randstad

Den Dolder is a railway station located in Den Dolder, Netherlands. The station is located on the Utrecht–Kampen railway (Utrecht-Amersfoort-Zwolle) and the Den Dolder–Baarn railway. It was opened in 1895. The current island platform was opened in 1914. This station was previously called Dolderscheweg (1895-1912).

== Train services ==
Route	Service type	Operator	Notes
Utrecht - Baarn	Local ("Sprinter")	NS	2x per hour
Utrecht - Amersfoort - Zwolle	Local ("Sprinter")	NS	2x per hour

== Bus services ==
Line	Route	Operator	Notes
59	Hilversum Station - Lage Vuursche - Den Dolder - Huis ter Heide - Zeist	U-OV and Pouw Vervoer	Mon-Sat during daytime hours only. U-OV operates this route during weekdays, Pouw Vervoer on Saturdays.
