= Soest Zuid railway station =

Railway station in the Netherlands

Soest Zuid
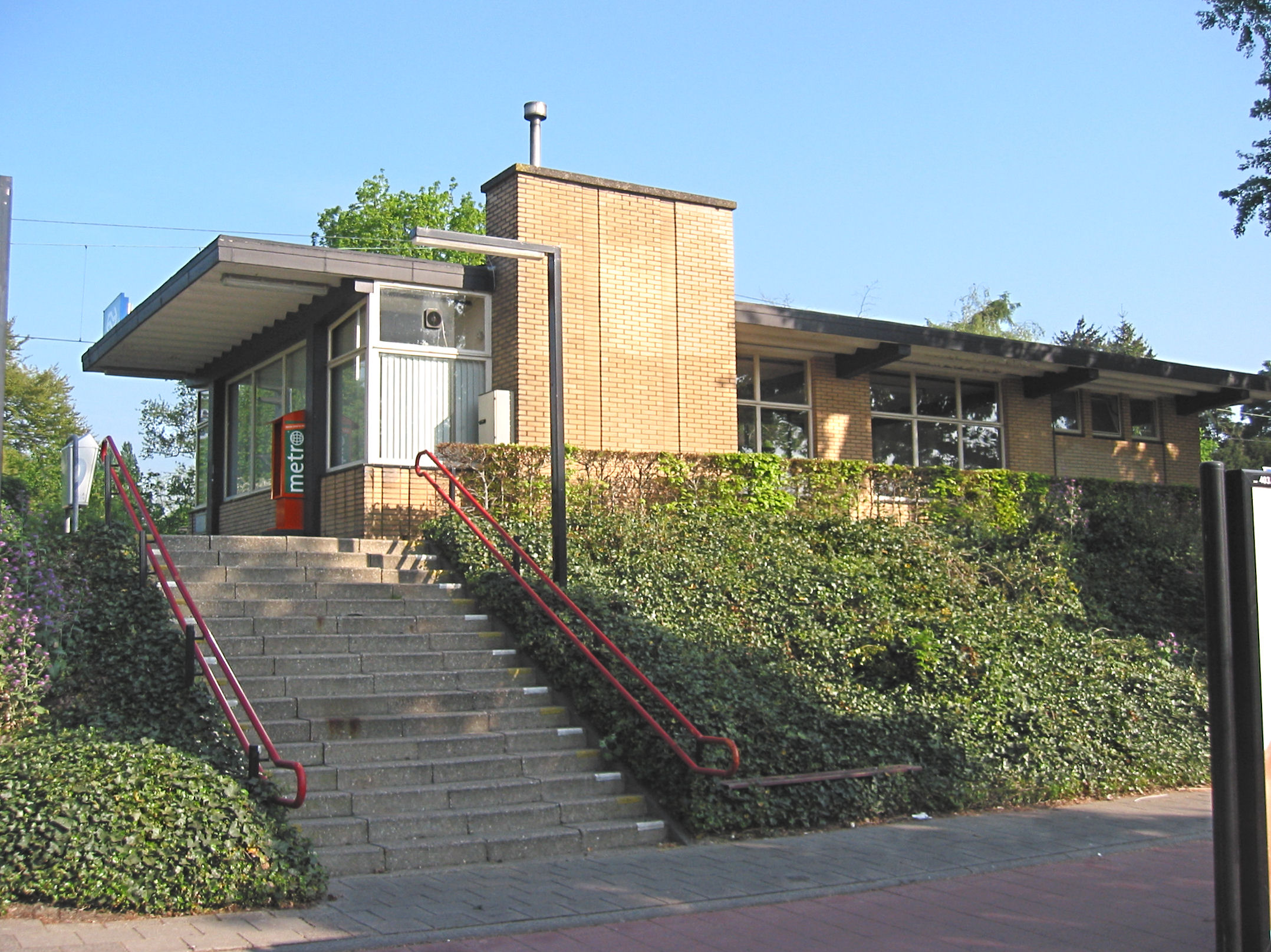

General information
- Location: Netherlands
- Coordinates: 52°9′55″N 5°18′11″E
- Line: Den Dolder–Baarn railway

History
- Opened: 27 June 1898, 1963 (current form)

Services
Preceding station	Nederlandse Spoorwegen	Following station
Den Dolder towards Utrecht Centraal	NS Sprinter 5500	Soest towards Baarn
Location
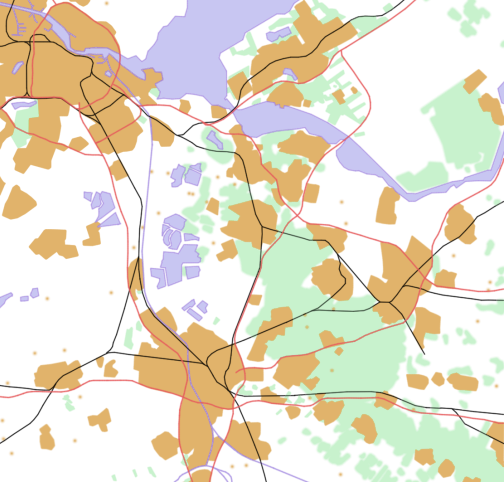
- Location within Northeastern Randstad

Soest Zuid is a railway station located in Soest, Netherlands. The station was opened on 27 June 1898 on the single track Stichtse lijn and is located on an embankment. In 1963 a new station building was built and the station was moved 200 m. The station was previously called Nieuwe Weg ("New Road") (1898-1939).

== Train services ==
The following train services call at Soest Zuid:

Route	Service type	Notes
Utrecht - Baarn	Local ("Sprinter")	2x per hour

== Bus services ==
Line	Route	Operator	Notes
70	Amersfoort - Soest Zuid - Soest Overhees - Soestdijk Noord - Hooge Vuursche - Hilversum	Syntus Utrecht; a few runs are operated by Pouw Vervoer and Van Kooten	
74	Soest Zuid - Smitsveen - Soestdijk Station - Soestdijk Noord	Syntus Utrecht	Mon-Sat during daytime hours only.
272	Bunschoten - Spakenburg - Baarn - Soestdijk Noord - Soest Smitsveen - Soest Zuid - Soesterberg P+R - Utrecht Science Park - Utrecht Rijnsweerd	Van Kooten	Rush hours only, but with one extra run at noon in both directions (only between Baarn and Utrecht Rijnsweerd).
452	Utrecht → De Uithof → De Bilt → Zeist → Huis ter Heide → Soesterberg → Soest	U-OV	Friday and Saturday late nights only (between midnight and 5 AM).
573	Soest - Baarn - Eemnes - Blaricum Tergooi Hospital	Syntus Utrecht	Mon-Sat during daytime hours only.
575	Soest Zuid - Soestduinen - Soesterberg - Zeist - Driebergen - Rijsenburg	Syntus Utrecht	Mon-Sat during daytime hours only.
N70	Amersfoort Eemplein - Amersfoort Centraal Station - Soest Station Zuid - Soest Overhees - Soestdijk Noord - Baarn	Pouw Vervoer	Friday and Saturday late nights only (between midnight and 5 AM).
