= Soest (Netherlands) railway station =

Railway station in the Netherlands

Soest
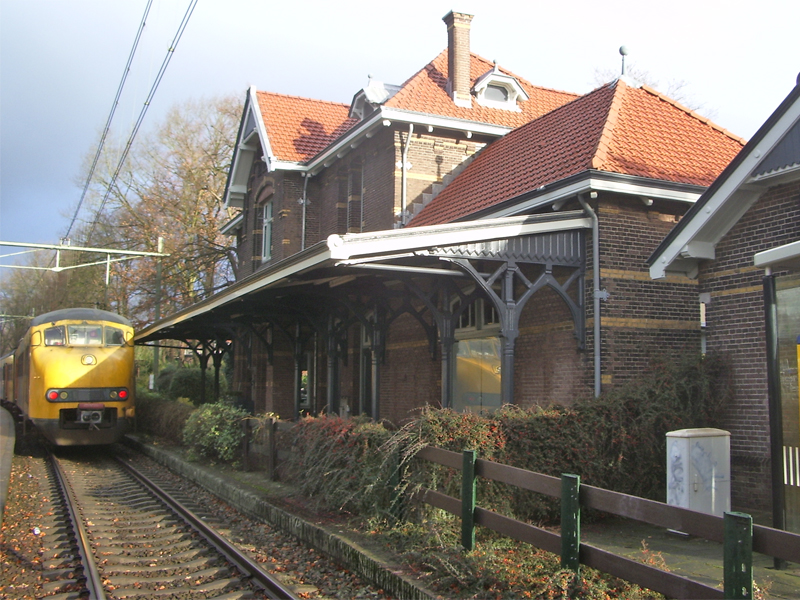

General information
- Location: Netherlands
- Coordinates: 52°10′23″N 5°18′36″E
- Line: Den Dolder–Baarn railway

History
- Opened: 27 June 1898

Services
| Preceding station | Nederlandse Spoorwegen | Following station |
|---|---|---|
| Soest Zuid towards Utrecht Centraal | NS Sprinter 5500 | Soestdijk towards Baarn |
Location
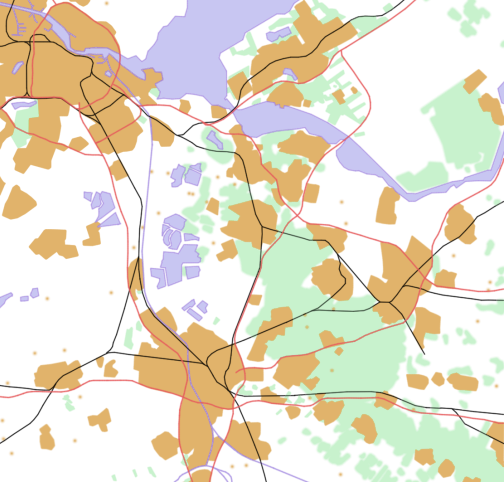
- Location within Northeastern Randstad

Soest is a railway station located in Soest, Netherlands. It is the second-least used railway station in the Netherlands after Eijsden railway station. The station was opened on 27 June 1898 on the single track Den Dolder–Baarn railway. It is the only station with two platforms on the line.

== Train services ==
The following train services call at Soest:

| Route | Service type | Notes |
|---|---|---|
| Utrecht - Baarn | Local ("Sprinter") | 2x per hour |

== Bus services ==
There is no bus service at this station. The nearest bus stop is in Soestdijk.

== See also ==
- List of busiest railway stations in the Netherlands
