= Utrecht Overvecht railway station =

Railway station in the Netherlands

Utrecht Overvecht
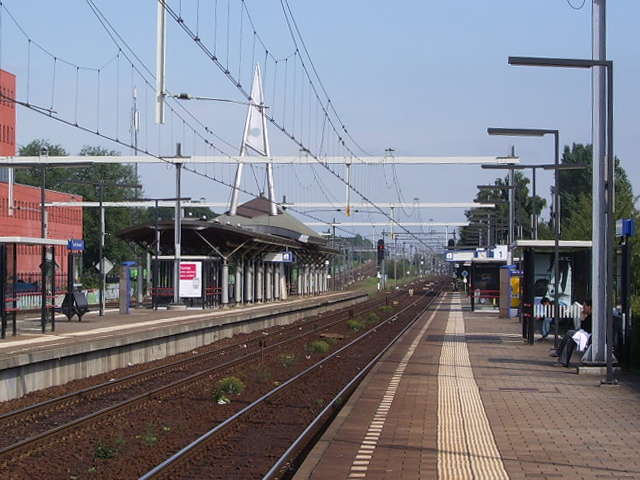

General information
- Location: Netherlands
- Coordinates: 52°6′36″N 5°7′31″E
- Line: Utrecht–Kampen railway

History
- Opened: 1968

Services
| Preceding station | Nederlandse Spoorwegen | Following station |
|---|---|---|
| Utrecht Centraal Terminus | NS Sprinter 5500 | Bilthoven towards Baarn |
| Utrecht Centraal Terminus | NS Sprinter 5600 | Bilthoven towards Zwolle |
| Utrecht Centraal Terminus | NS Sprinter 5700 | Hollandsche Rading towards Leiden Centraal |
| Utrecht Centraal Terminus | NS Sprinter 4900 Until 20:00 | Hilversum Sportpark towards Almere Centrum |
| Utrecht Centraal Terminus | NS Sprinter 4900 After 20:00 | Hollandsche Rading towards Almere Centrum |
Location
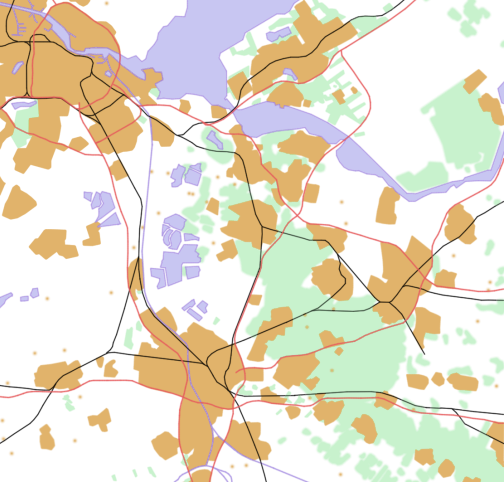
- Location within Northeastern Randstad

Utrecht Overvecht is a railway station located in Overvecht, Utrecht, Netherlands. The station opened in 1968 and is on the Utrecht–Kampen railway. The station has had 3 platforms since 1992. It also has a kids' slide from the outside street for use by busy passengers.

== Train services ==
The following services call at Utrecht Overvecht:

- 2x per hour local service (Sprinter) from Utrecht to Baarn
- 2x per hour local service (Sprinter) from Utrecht to Amersfoort, and Zwolle
- 2x per hour local service (Sprinter) from Utrecht to Hilversum, and Almere
- 2x per hour local service (Sprinter) from The Hague to Leiden, Hoofddorp, Schiphol Airport, Duivendrecht, Hilversum, and Utrecht

== Bus services ==
- 1 from Overvecht Hospital to Utrecht Overvecht, Utrecht Centraal, and Utrecht Lunetten
- 8 from Utrecht Overvecht to Overvecht Zuid, Utrecht Centraal, and Utrecht Lunetten
- 10 from Utrecht Lunetten to Transwijk, Oog in Al, Zuilen, Utrecht Overvecht, Rijnsweerd, De Uithof University, and UMC Hospital
- 30 from Overvecht Hospital to Utrecht Overvecht, De Uithof University, UMC Hospital, and WKZ Children's Hospital
- 122 from Utrecht Overvecht to Westbroek, Oud-Maarsseveen, Breukelveen, and Loosdrecht
