= Hollandsche Rading railway station =

Railway station in the Netherlands

Hollandsche Rading
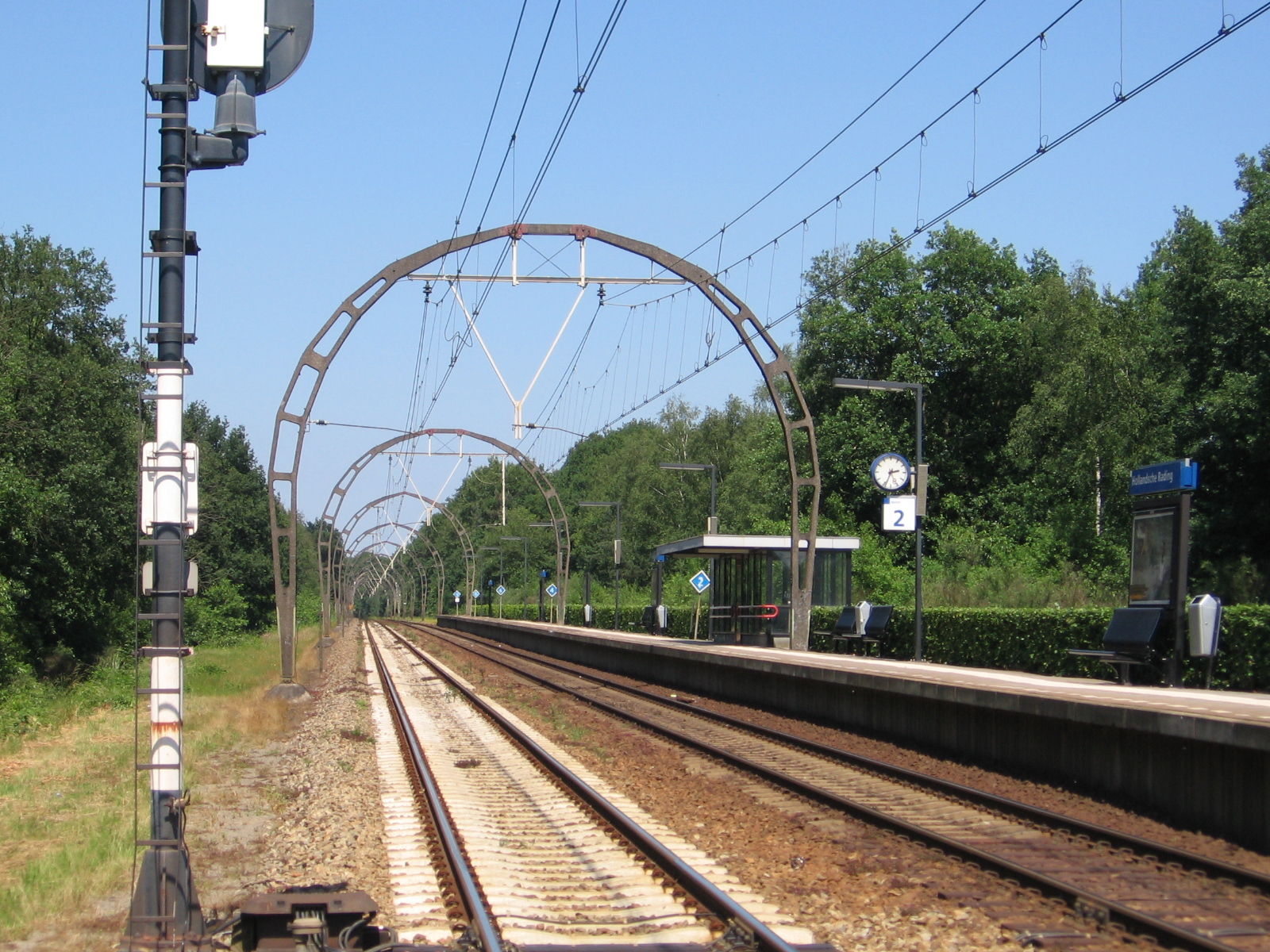

General information
- Location: Netherlands
- Coordinates: 52°10′41″N 5°10′45″E
- Line: Hilversum–Lunetten railway

History
- Opened: 1 June 1885

Services
Preceding station	Nederlandse Spoorwegen	Following station
Utrecht Overvecht towards Utrecht Centraal	NS Sprinter 4900 After 20:00	Hilversum Sportpark towards Almere Centrum
Utrecht Overvecht towards Utrecht Centraal	NS Sprinter 5700 Until 20:30	Hilversum Sportpark towards Leiden Centraal
Location
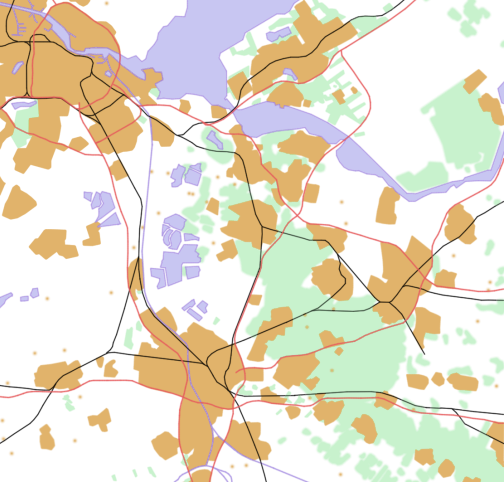
- Location within Northeastern Randstad

Hollandsche Rading is a Dutch railway station located along the railway line Hilversum - Utrecht, near the town of Hollandsche Rading and immediately west of the A27 motorway. The station was opened on 1 June 1885.

The railway station is located exactly on the border of two provinces. Platform 1, for the southbound trains (Utrecht-bound), lies in the province of Utrecht, while platform 2, for the northbound (Hilversum-bound) trains, is located in North Holland.

Hollandsche Rading can be translated in Dutch to Holland Border as in North Holland going into Utrecht.

== Train services ==
Series	Route	Service type	Operator	Notes
5700	Utrecht - Hollandsche Rading - Hilversum - Weesp - Amsterdam Zuid - Schiphol	Local ("Sprinter")	NS	Two runs per hour from Monday to Friday until 8:00pm.
14900	Almere - Hilversum - Hollandsche Rading - Utrecht	Local ("Sprinter")	NS	Two runs per hour after 8:00pm on weekdays and all weekend.

=== Bus services ===
Line	Route	Operator	Notes
58	Hilversum - Hollandsche Rading - Maartensdijk - Bilthoven - De Bilt - Zeist	U-OV and Pouw Vervoer	No service on evenings and Sundays. U-OV operates this bus during weekdays, Pouw Vervoer on Saturdays.

Note: The bus stop is located close to the station, but is called Vuurse Dreef.

== Gallery ==
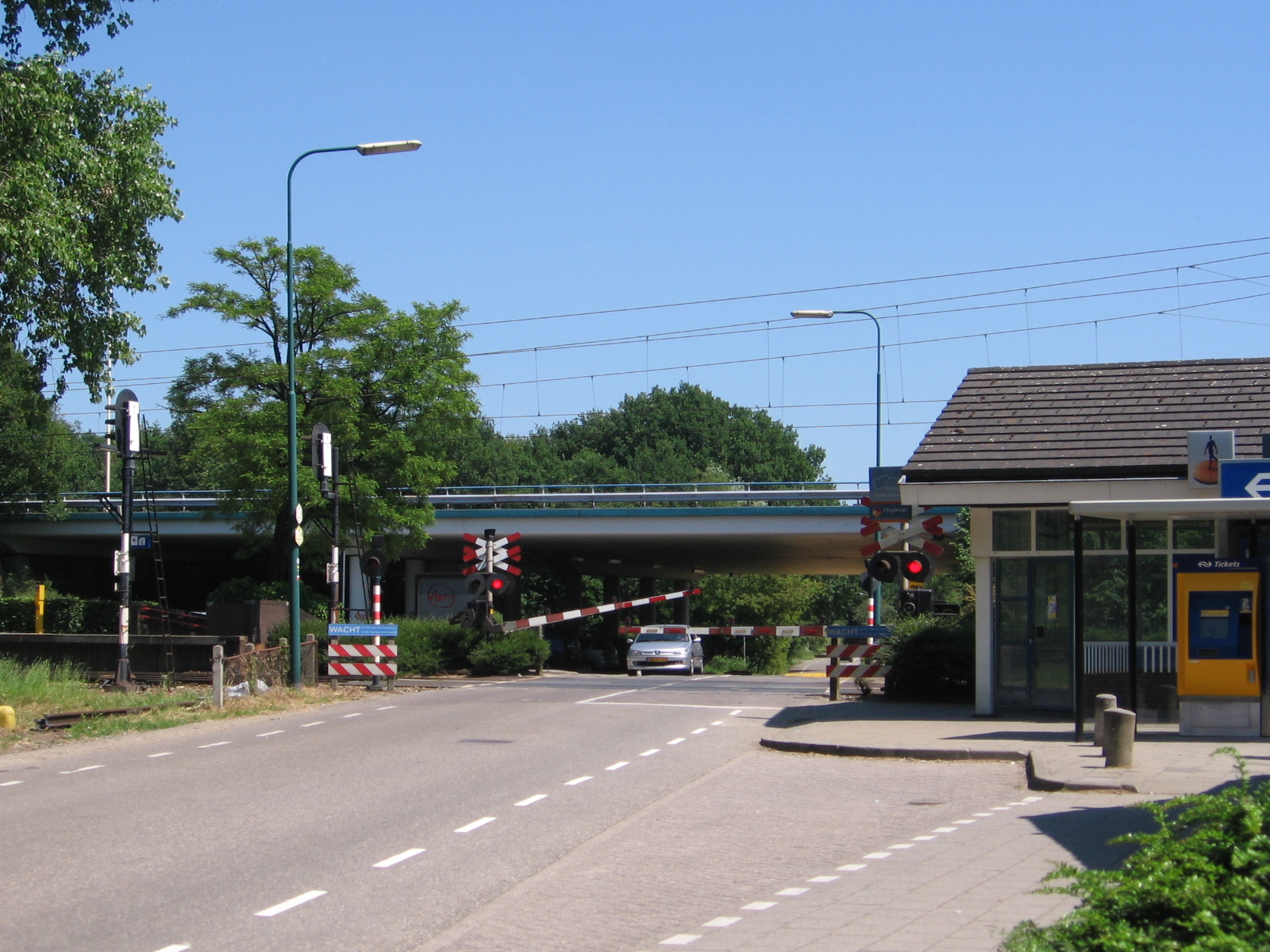
The intersection in the 'middle' of the station, the exact province border.

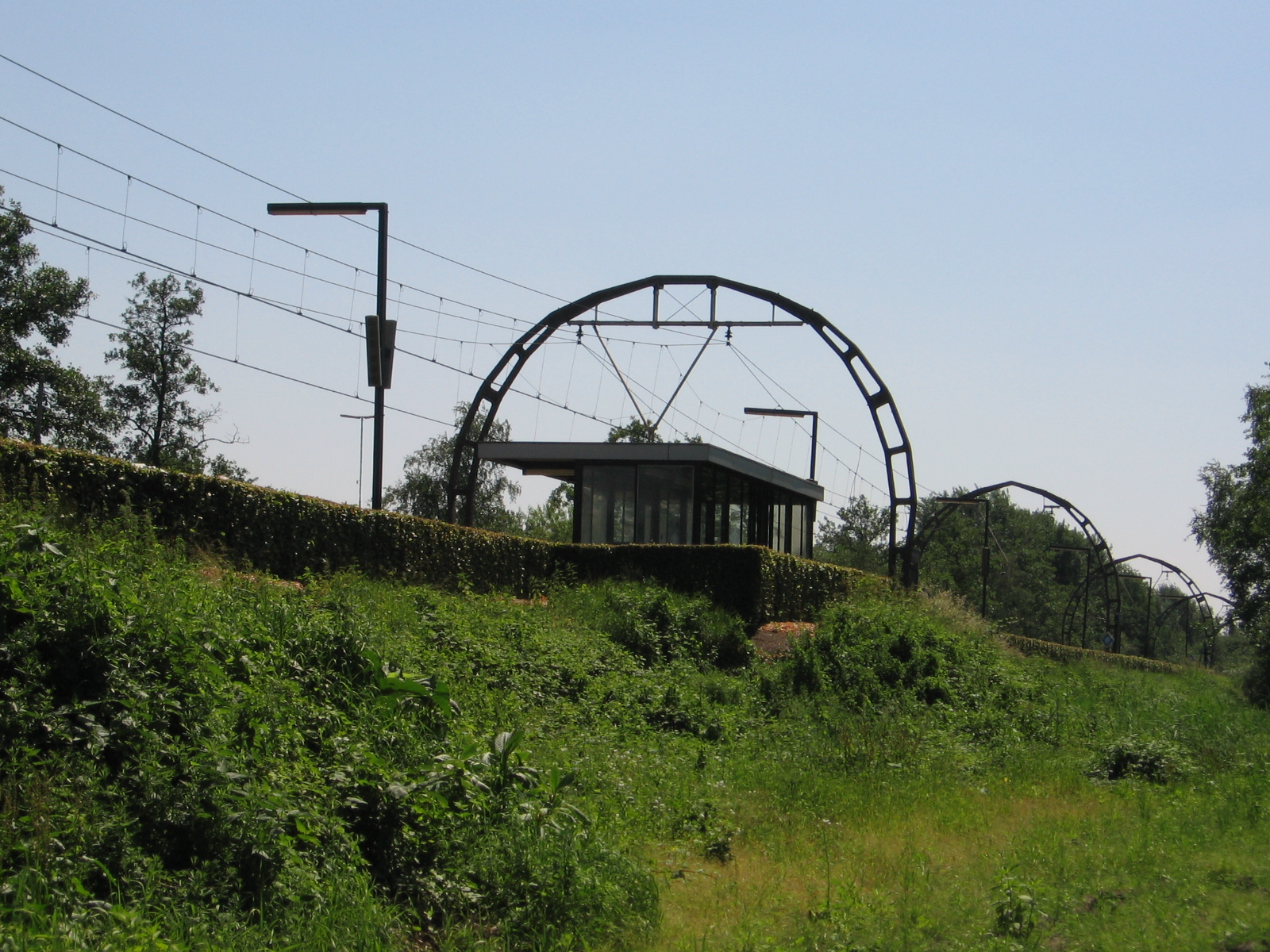
Platform 1, for the southbound trains.

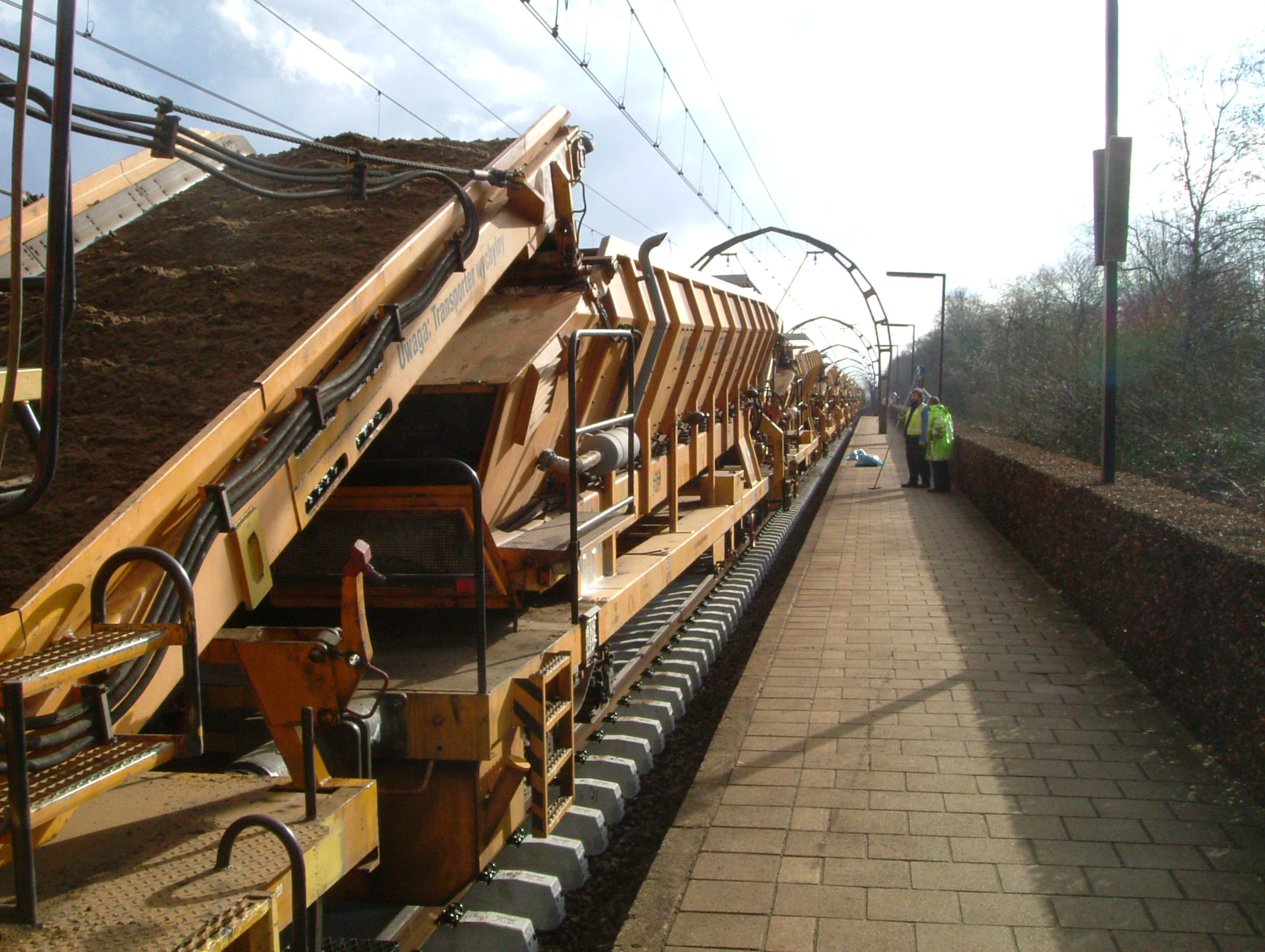
Replacement of wooden ties by concrete ones, in March 2005.
