= Hollandsche Rading =

- Village
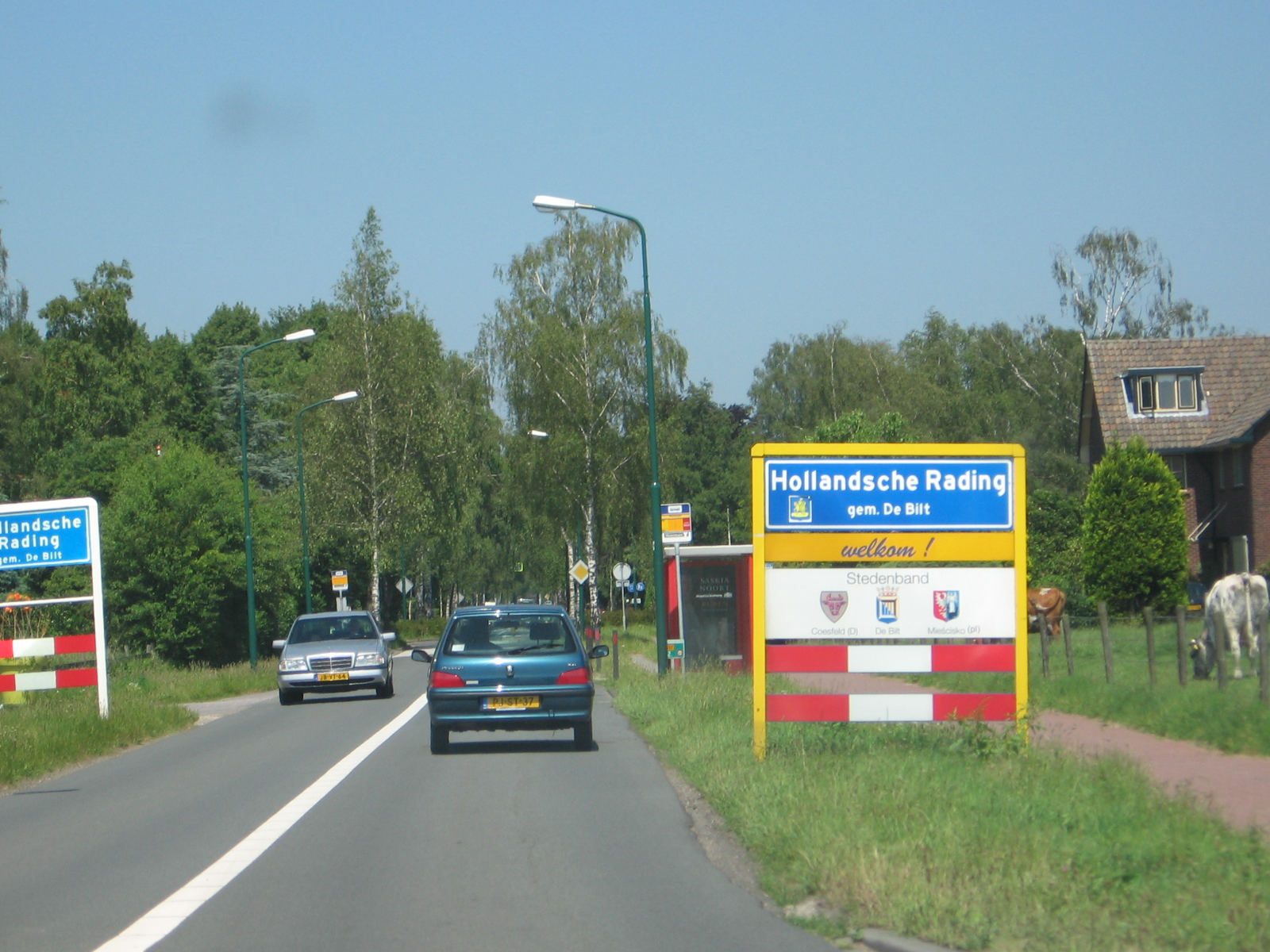
- Entrance sign for Hollandsche Rading

- Location in the Netherlands Hollandsche Rading (Netherlands)
- Coordinates: 52°10′30″N 5°10′45″E
- Country: Netherlands
- Province: Utrecht
- Municipality: De Bilt

Area
  - Total: 8.33 km^{2} (3.22 sq mi)
- Elevation: 2 m (6.6 ft)

Population (2024)
  - Total: 1,547
  - Density: 186/km^{2} (481/sq mi)
- Time zone: UTC+1 (CET)
  - Summer (DST): UTC+2 (CEST)
- Postal code: 3739
- Dialing code: 035

Hollandsche Rading is a village in the Dutch province of Utrecht. It is a part of the municipality of De Bilt, and lies about 5 km south of Hilversum. Hollandsche Rading has a railway station on the route between Utrecht and Hilversum.

The name means "Border of Holland": the village is located on the border between the provinces Utrecht and North Holland.

== History ==
It was first mentioned in 1696 as Die Hollantse Radinge, but had been the border since 1352. The border is nowadays just to the north of the village. Up to 1930, Hollandsche Rading mainly consisted of heath. Yet, in 1885, a railway station was constructed in the hamlet. The houses were built for the people returning from the Dutch East Indies. In 1938, a church was built.

== Gallery ==
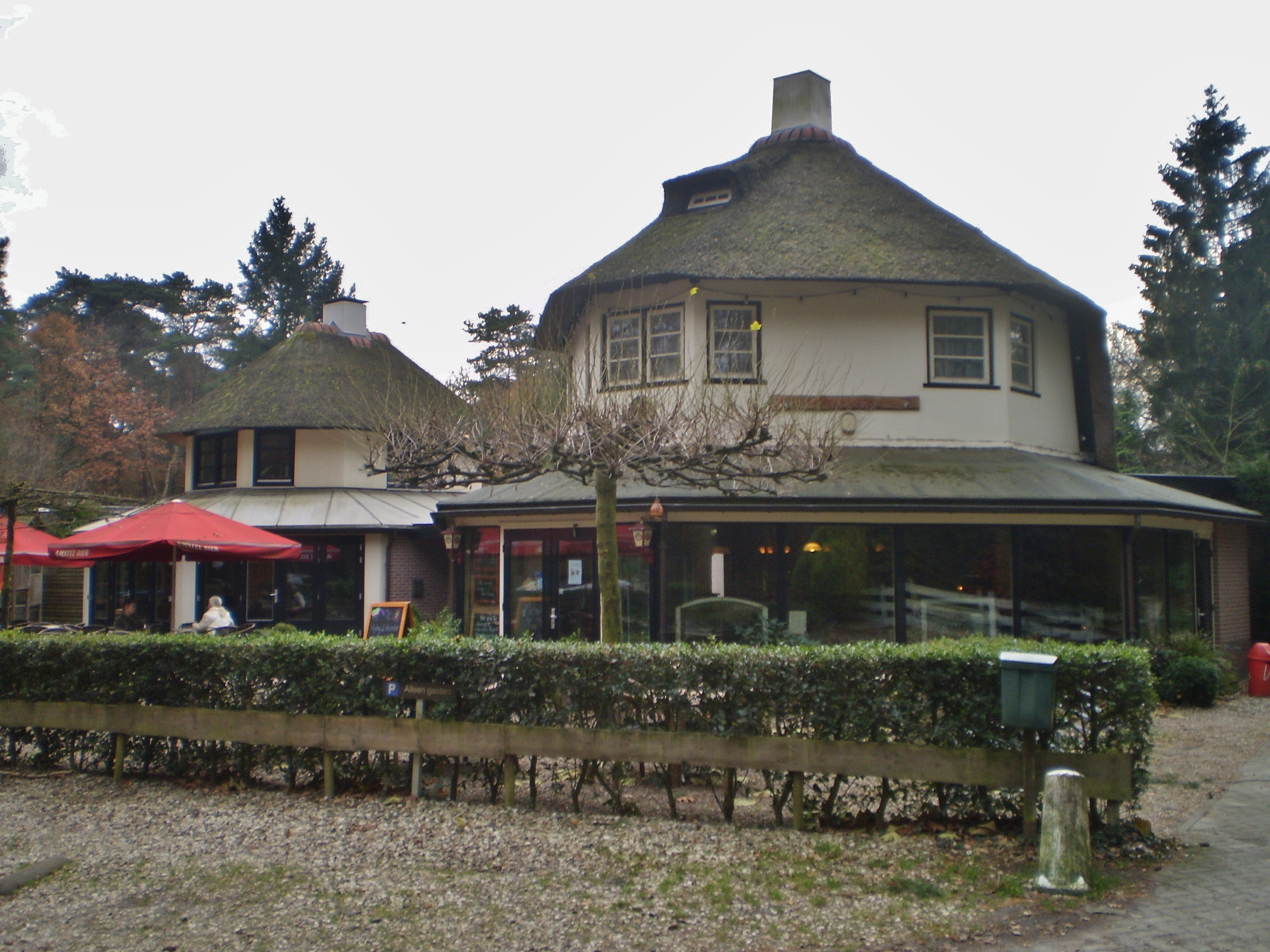
Restaurant in Hollandsche Rading

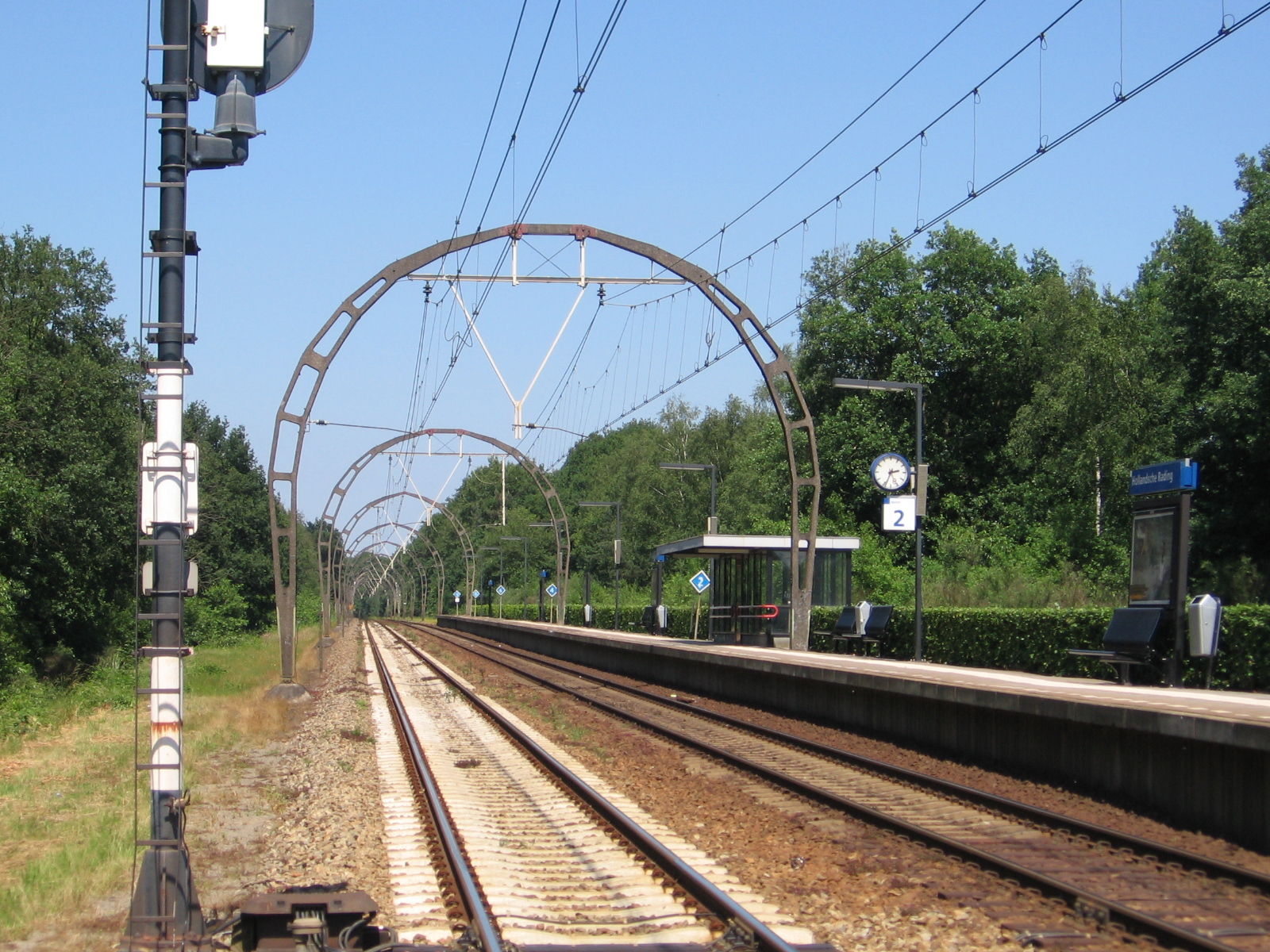
Railway station

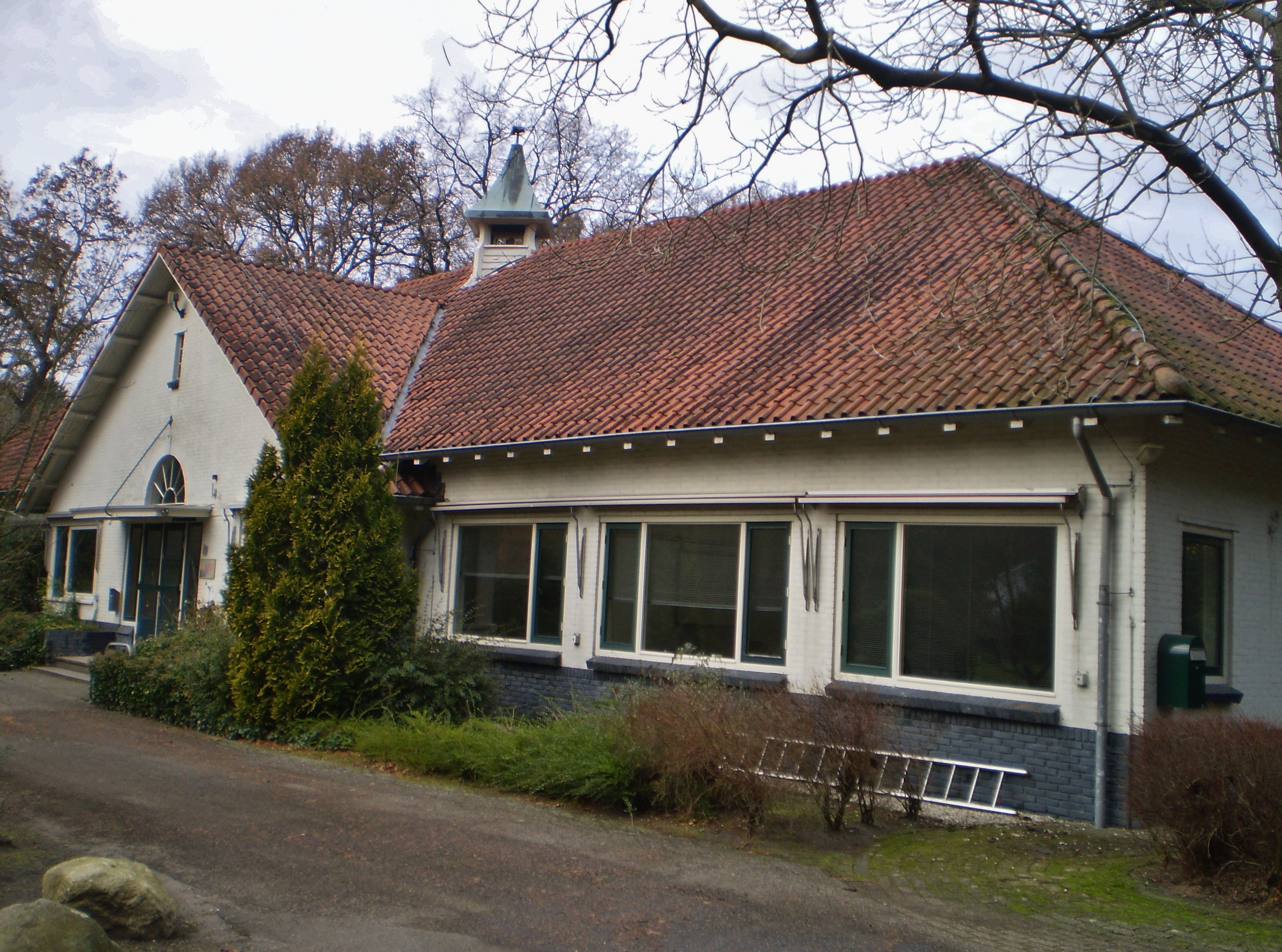
House in Hollandsche Rading

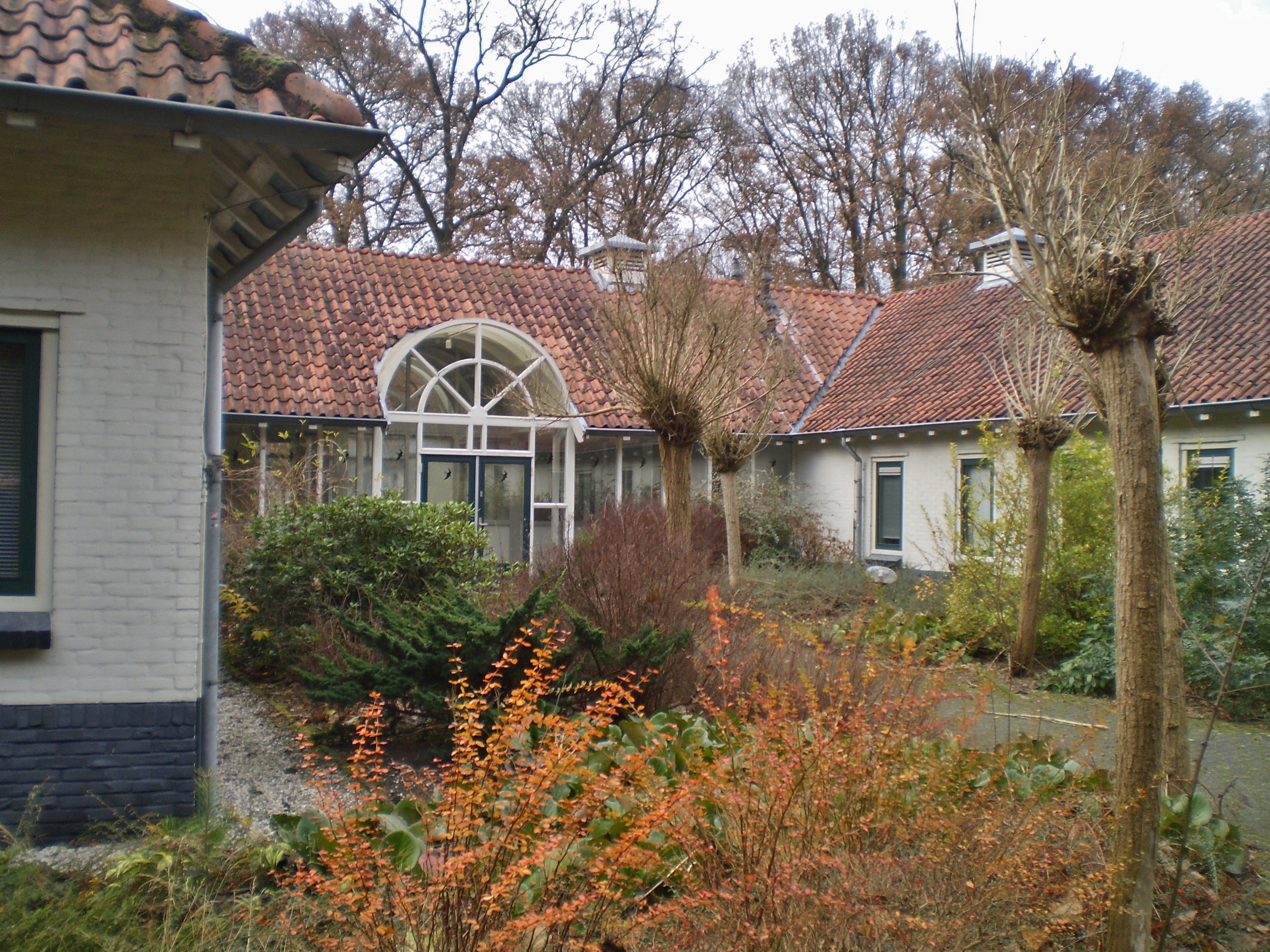
House in Hollandsche Rading
