= Bilthoven railway station =

Railway station in the Netherlands

Bilthoven
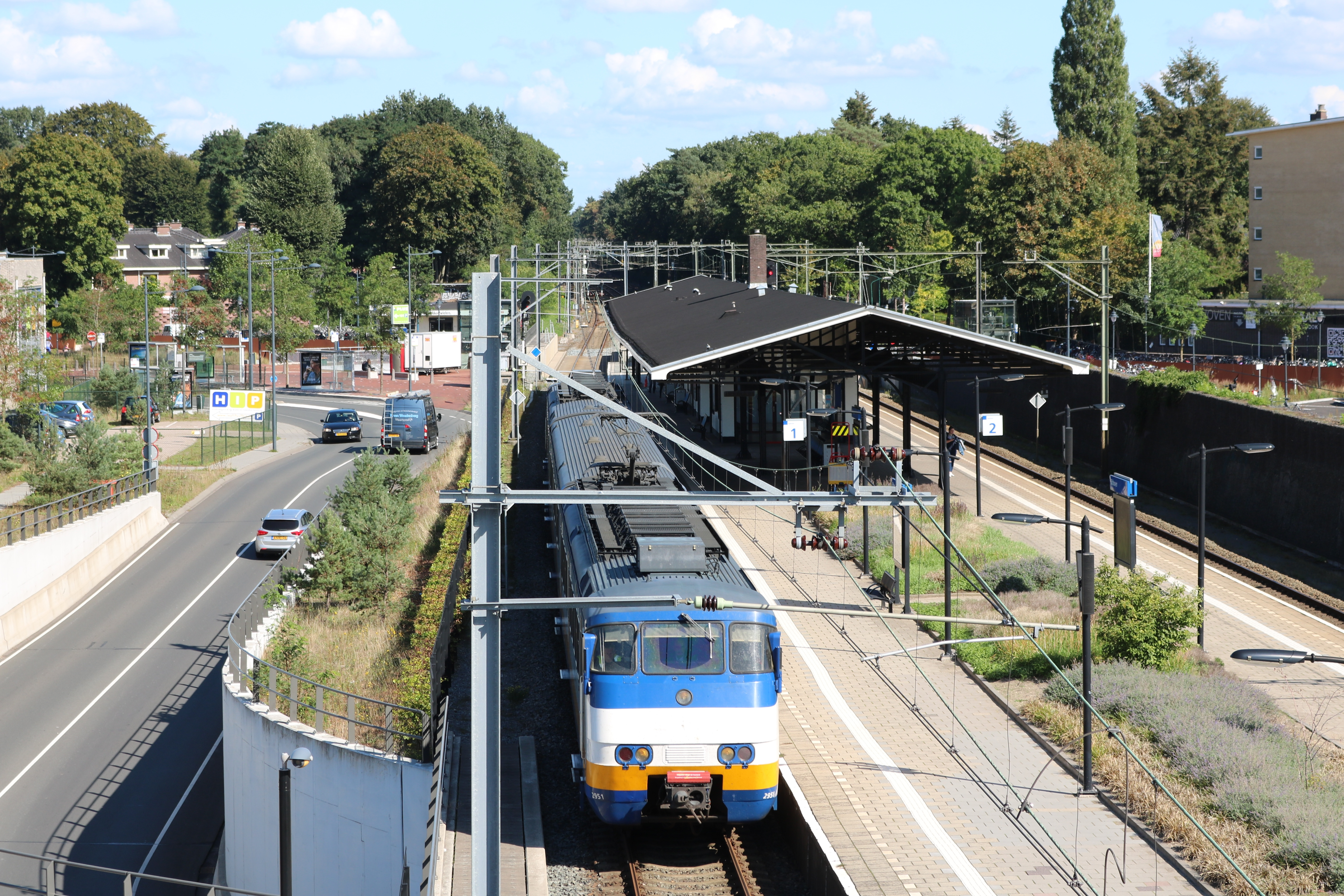

General information
- Location: Netherlands
- Coordinates: 52°7′48″N 5°12′19″E
- Line: Utrecht–Kampen railway

History
- Opened: 20 August 1863, 1907 (current form)

Services
Preceding station	Nederlandse Spoorwegen	Following station
Utrecht Overvecht towards Utrecht Centraal	NS Sprinter 5500	Den Dolder towards Baarn
Utrecht Overvecht towards Utrecht Centraal	NS Sprinter 5600	Den Dolder towards Zwolle
Location
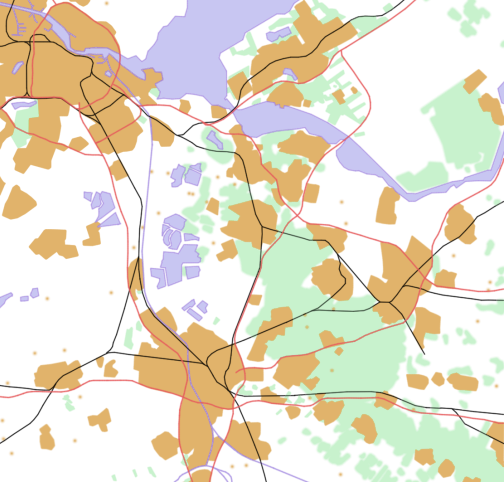
- Location within Northeastern Randstad

Bilthoven is a railway station located in Bilthoven, Netherlands. The station is located on the Utrecht–Kampen railway between Utrecht and Amersfoort, and was opened on 20 August 1863. The current island platform was opened in 1907. The station was previously called De Bilt (1863–1918).

== Train services ==
The following services call at Bilthoven:

Route	Service type	Operator	Notes
Utrecht - Baarn	Local ("Sprinter")	NS	2x per hour
Utrecht - Amersfoort - Zwolle	Local ("Sprinter")	NS	2x per hour

=== Bus services ===
Line	Route	Operator	Notes
31	Bilthoven - De Bilt - Utrecht Science Park - Utrecht Rijnsweerd - Utrecht Lunetten	U-OV	Not on weekends and limited service during school vacations.
58	Hilversum - Hollandsche Rading - Maartensdijk - Bilthoven - De Bilt - Zeist	U-OV and Pouw Vervoer	Not on evenings and Sundays. U-OV operates this route during weekdays, Pouw Vervoer on Saturdays.
77	Nieuwegein Zuid - Nieuwegein Stadscentrum - Utrecht Kanaleneiland - Utrecht CS - De Bilt - Bilthoven	U-OV	
78	Bilthoven Station → De Leijen → Bilthoven Station → Centrumwijk → Bilthoven Station	U-OV	Not on evenings and Sundays.
258	Bilthoven Station - Lievegoed Kliniek	Pouw Vervoer	Rush hours only.
