= Hilversum Sportpark railway station =

Railway station in the Netherlands

Hilversum Sportpark

General information
- Location: Netherlands
- Coordinates: 52°12′58″N 5°11′14″E
- Line: Hilversum–Lunetten railway

Services
Preceding station	Nederlandse Spoorwegen	Following station
Utrecht Overvecht towards Utrecht Centraal	NS Sprinter 4900 Until 20:00	Hilversum towards Almere Centrum
Hollandsche Rading towards Utrecht Centraal	NS Sprinter 4900 After 20:00	Hilversum towards Almere Centrum
Hollandsche Rading towards Utrecht Centraal	NS Sprinter 5700	Hilversum towards Leiden Centraal
Location
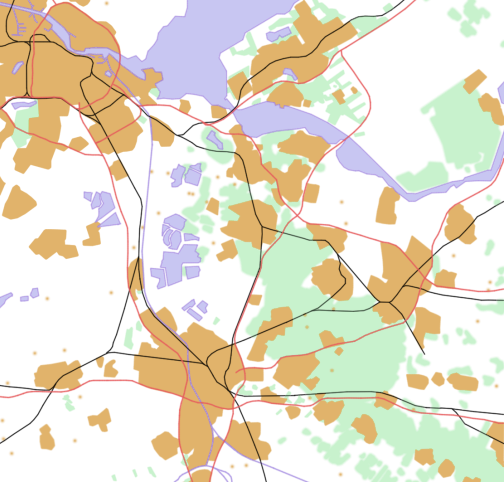
- Location within Northeastern Randstad

Hilversum Sportpark is a railway station in Hilversum, Netherlands. It lies 1 kilometre (0.62 mi) south of Hilversum town centre. The station was opened in 1874 and is on the Hilversum - Utrecht railway line. The station was previously called Amersfoortsche Straatweg (1874-1919), and Soestdijker Straatweg (1919-1965). The station is heavily used during weekdays because an important branch of the ROC (a community college) is located next to the station.

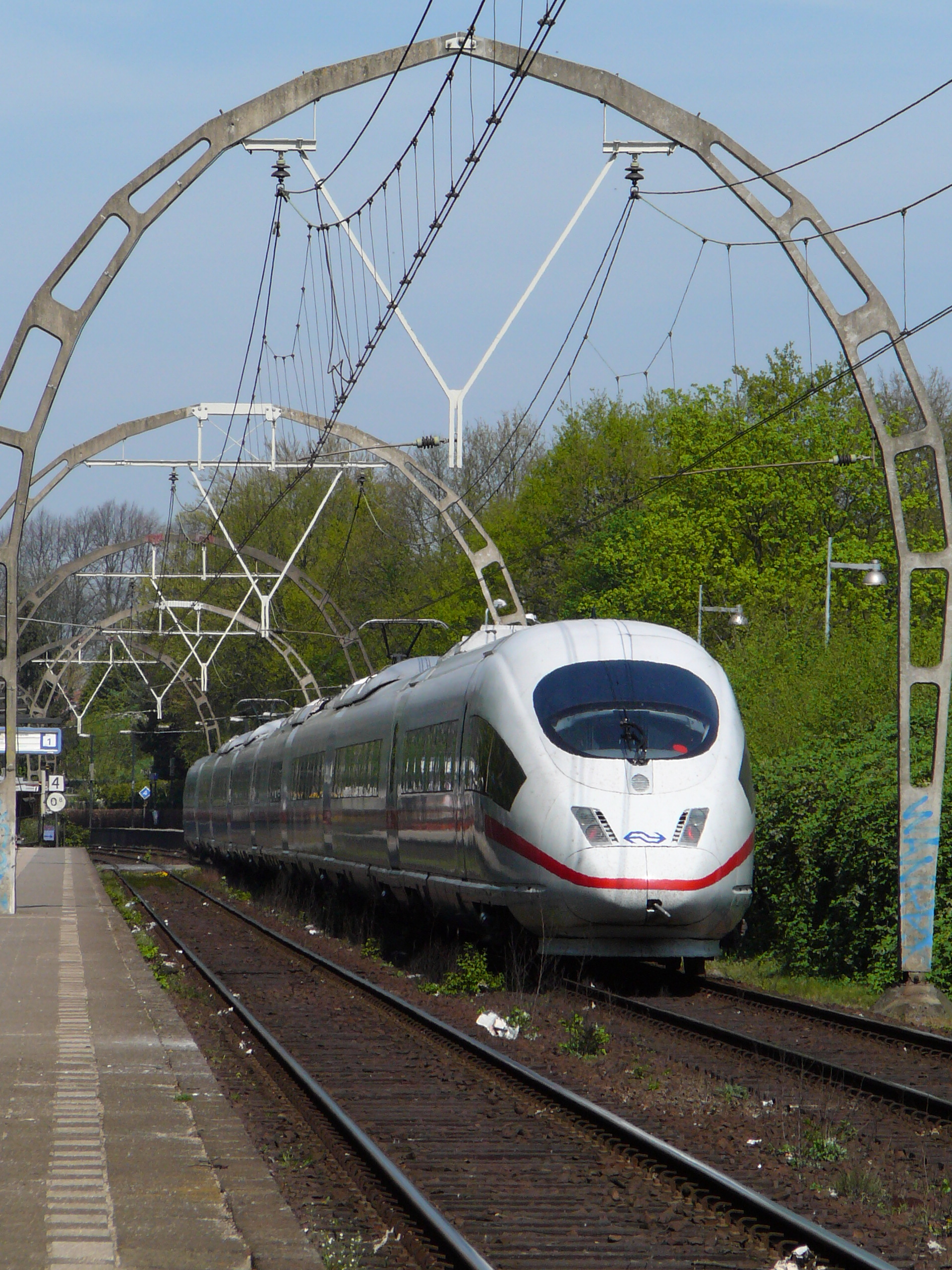
A diverted ICE passing through Hilversum Sportpark

== Train services ==
Route	Service type	Notes
Utrecht - Hilversum - Almere	Local ("Sprinter")	2x per hour (1x per hour on evenings (Almere - Hilversum) and Sundays (entire route))
The Hague - Leiden - Hoofddorp - Schiphol - Duivendrecht - Hilversum - Utrecht	Local ("Sprinter")	2x per hour

== Bus services ==
Line	Route	Operator	Notes
3	Hilversum Station - Hilversum Sportpark Station - Tergooi Ziekenhuis (Hospital)	Connexxion	
59	Hilversum Station - Lage Vuursche - Den Dolder - Huis ter Heide - Zeist	U-OV and Pouw Vervoer	Mon-Sat during daytime hours only. U-OV operates this route during weekdays, Pouw Vervoer on Saturdays.
70	Amersfoort Station - Soest Zuid - Soest Overhees - Soestdijk Noord - Hooge Vuursche - Hilversum Station	Syntus Utrecht; a few runs are operated by Pouw Vervoer and Van Kooten	
100	(Hilversum Station -) Blaricum Bijvanck - Huizen - Naarden - Naarden-Bussum Station	Connexxion	The route between Hilversum and Blaricum is served during weekday daytime hours only.
320	Hilversum Station - Blaricum Bijvanck - Huizen - Blaricum Ziekenhuis (Hospital) - Naarden Gooimeer - Muiden P+R - Amsterdam Amstel Station	Connexxion and Pouw Vervoer	During weekday daytime hours, Saturday mornings and Sunday evenings, some buses only run between Hilversum and Huizen. During morning rush hours, 4 extra buses run between Hilversum Station and Hilversum Arenapark.
N32	Hilversum Station → Eemnes → Blaricum Bijvanck → Huizen	Pouw Vervoer	Only runs during Saturday late nights (between midnight and 5 AM).
