= Soestdijk railway station =

Railway station in the Netherlands

Soestdijk
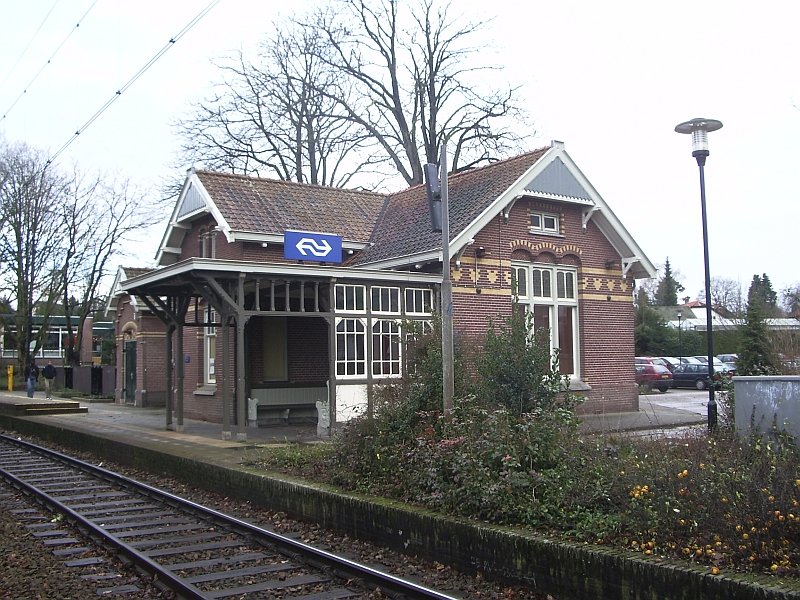

General information
- Location: Netherlands
- Coordinates: 52°11′0″N 5°18′02″E
- Line: Den Dolder–Baarn railway

History
- Opened: 27 June 1898

Services
Preceding station	Nederlandse Spoorwegen	Following station
Soest towards Utrecht Centraal	NS Sprinter 5500	Baarn Terminus
Location
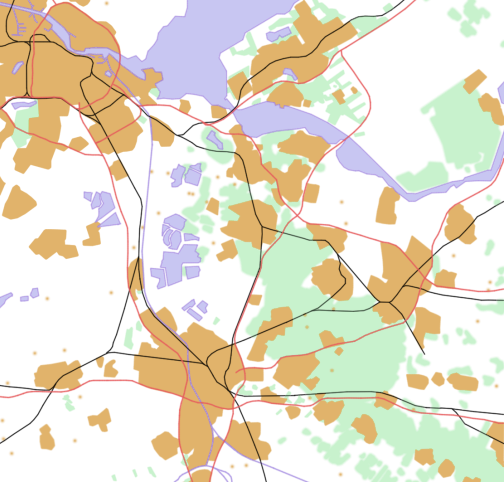
- Location within Northeastern Randstad

Soestdijk is a railway station located in Soestdijk, Netherlands. The station was opened on 27 June 1898 on the single track Den Dolder–Baarn railway.

== Train services ==
The following train services call at Soestdijk:

Route	Service type	Notes
Utrecht - Baarn	Local ("Sprinter")	2x per hour

== Bus services ==
Line	Route	Operator	Notes
74	Soest Zuid - Smitsveen - Soestdijk Station - Soestdijk Noord	Syntus Utrecht	Mon-Sat during daytime hours only.
