= Den Dolder =

- Village
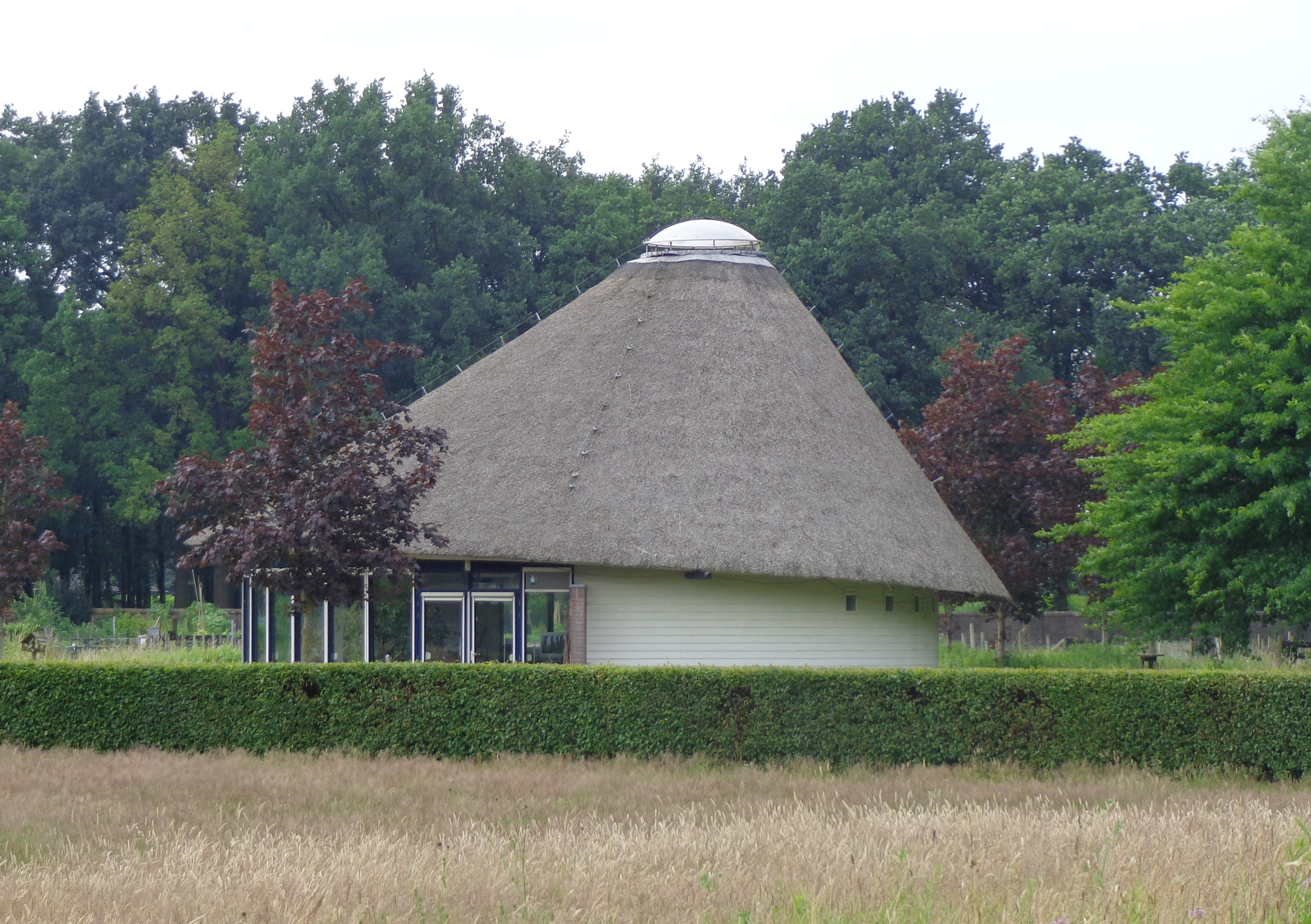
- Farm De Molshoop

- Location in the Netherlands Den Dolder (Netherlands)
- Coordinates: 52°6′23″N 5°14′25″E
- Country: Netherlands
- Province: Utrecht
- Municipality: Zeist

Area
  - Total: 4.19 km^{2} (1.62 sq mi)
- Elevation: 6 m (20 ft)

Population (2021)
  - Total: 4,420
  - Density: 1,050/km^{2} (2,730/sq mi)
- Time zone: UTC+1 (CET)
  - Summer (DST): UTC+2 (CEST)
- Postal code: 3734
- Dialing code: 030

Den Dolder is a village in the Dutch province of Utrecht. It is a part of the municipality of Zeist, and lies about 4 km northeast of Bilthoven. Den Dolder has a railway station on the route between Amersfoort and Utrecht and is best known for its mental institutions such as Dennendal and the Willem Arntz Hoeve. Den Dolder also houses the big Dutch sauce manufacturer Remia referring to Den Dolder as Holland's Heart of Sauces as is depicted on the factory's side and is visible from the train passing by.

== Transportation ==
The village is served by Den Dolder railway station.

== Notable people from Den Dolder ==
- Morris Schuring (born 2005), racing driver
- Flynt Schuring (born 2006), racing driver

== Gallery ==
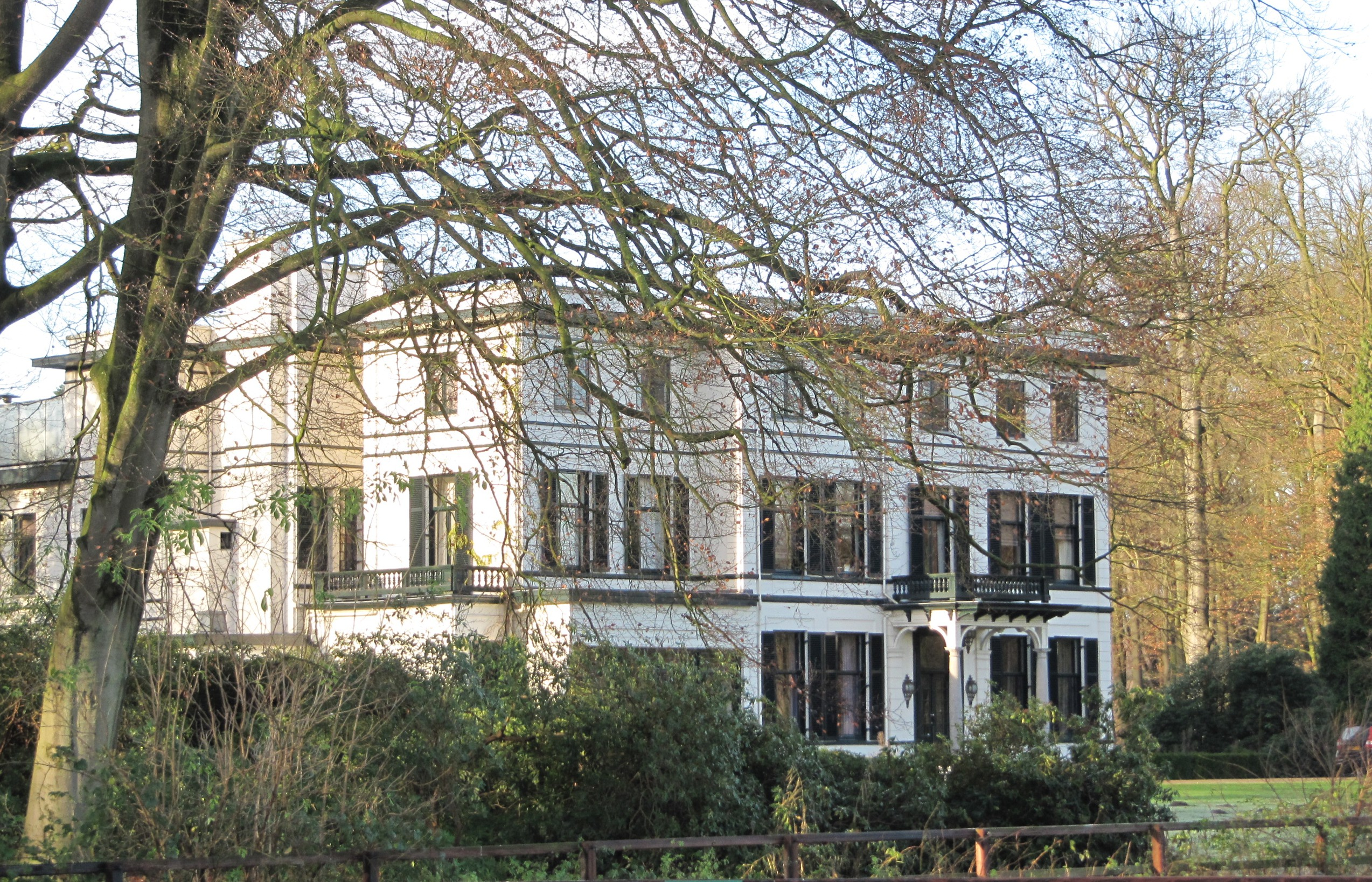
Prins Hendrikoord

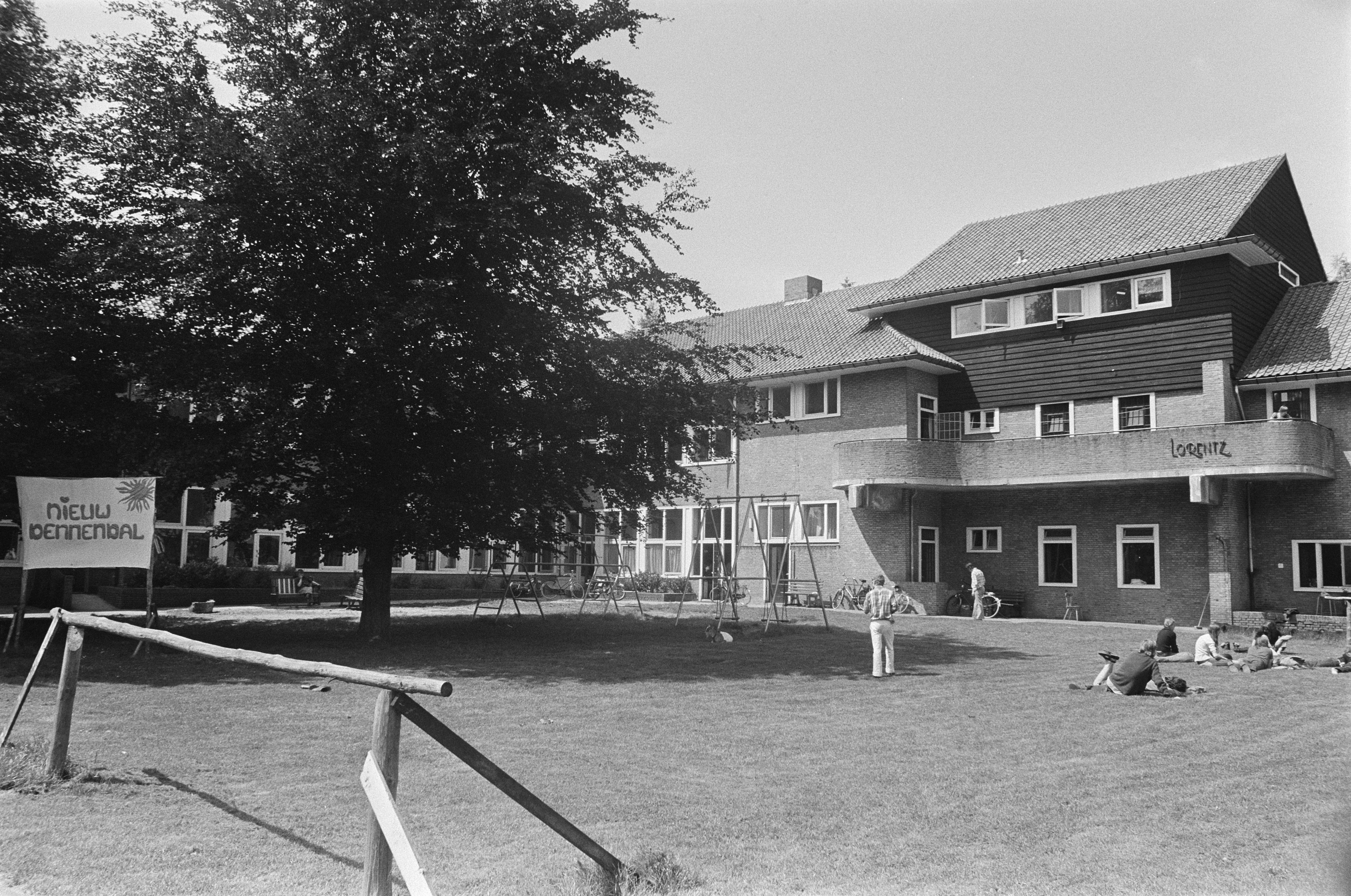
Dennendal

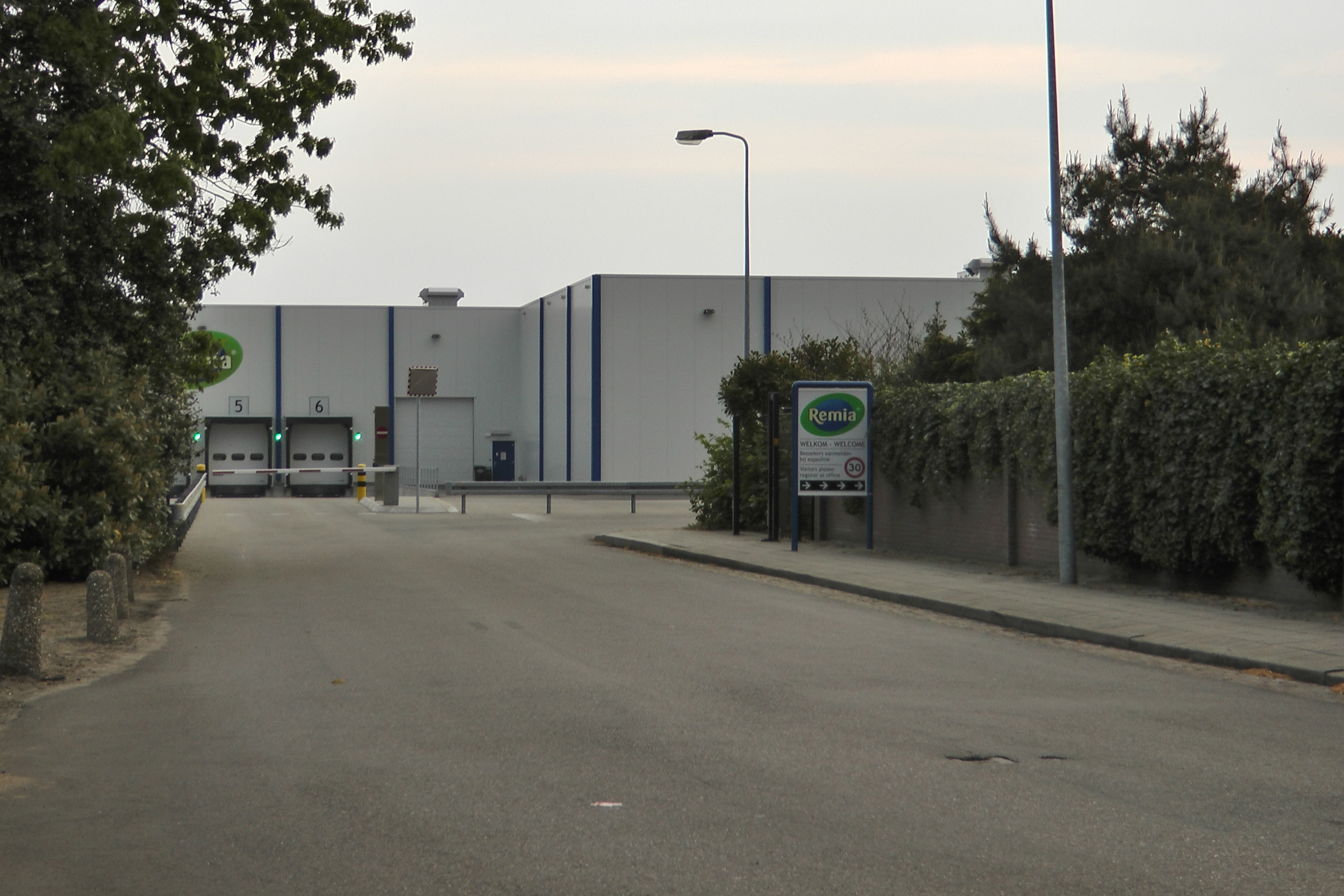
Remia factory

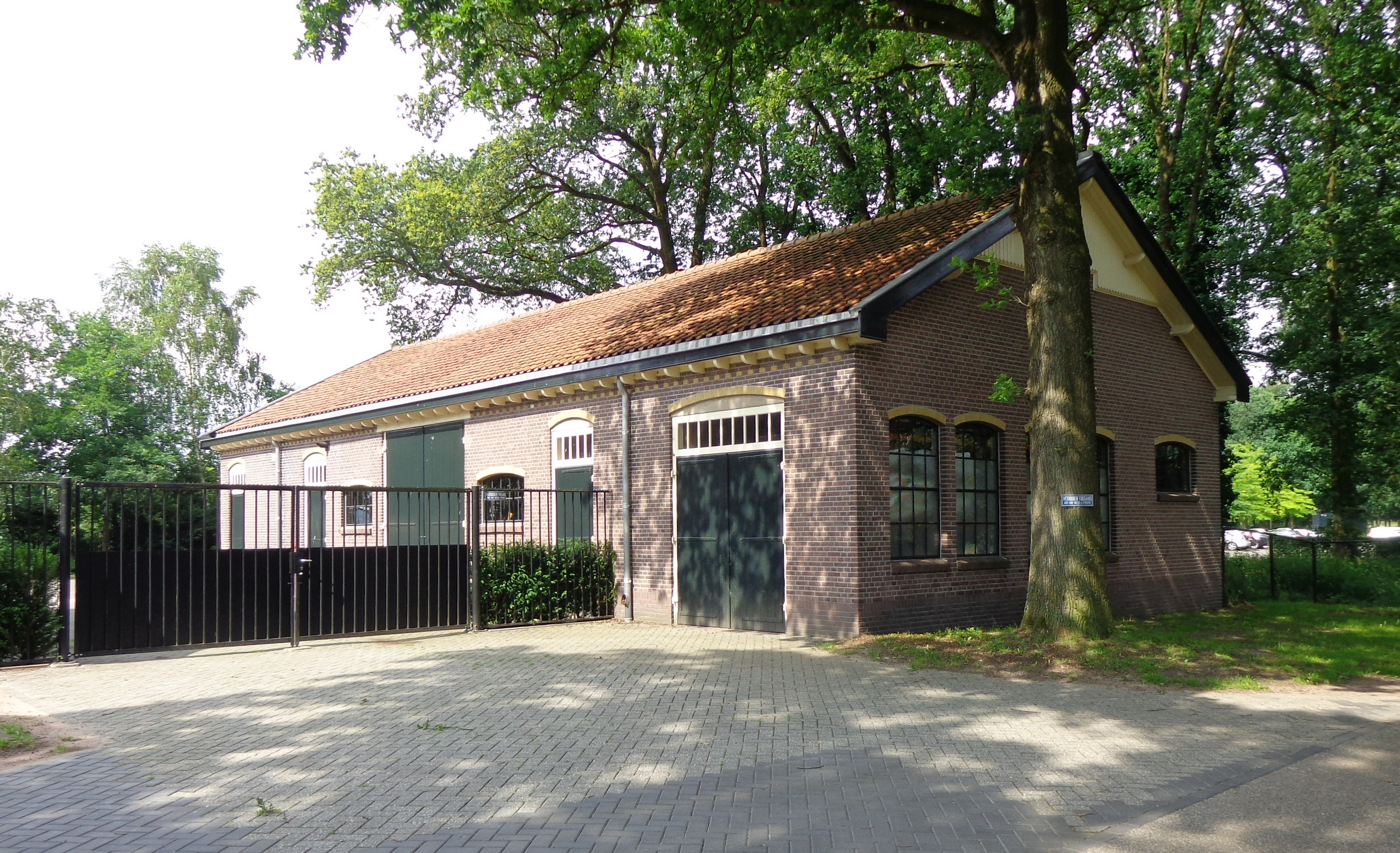
Shed in Den Dolder
