= Baarn railway station =

Railway station in the Netherlands

Baarn
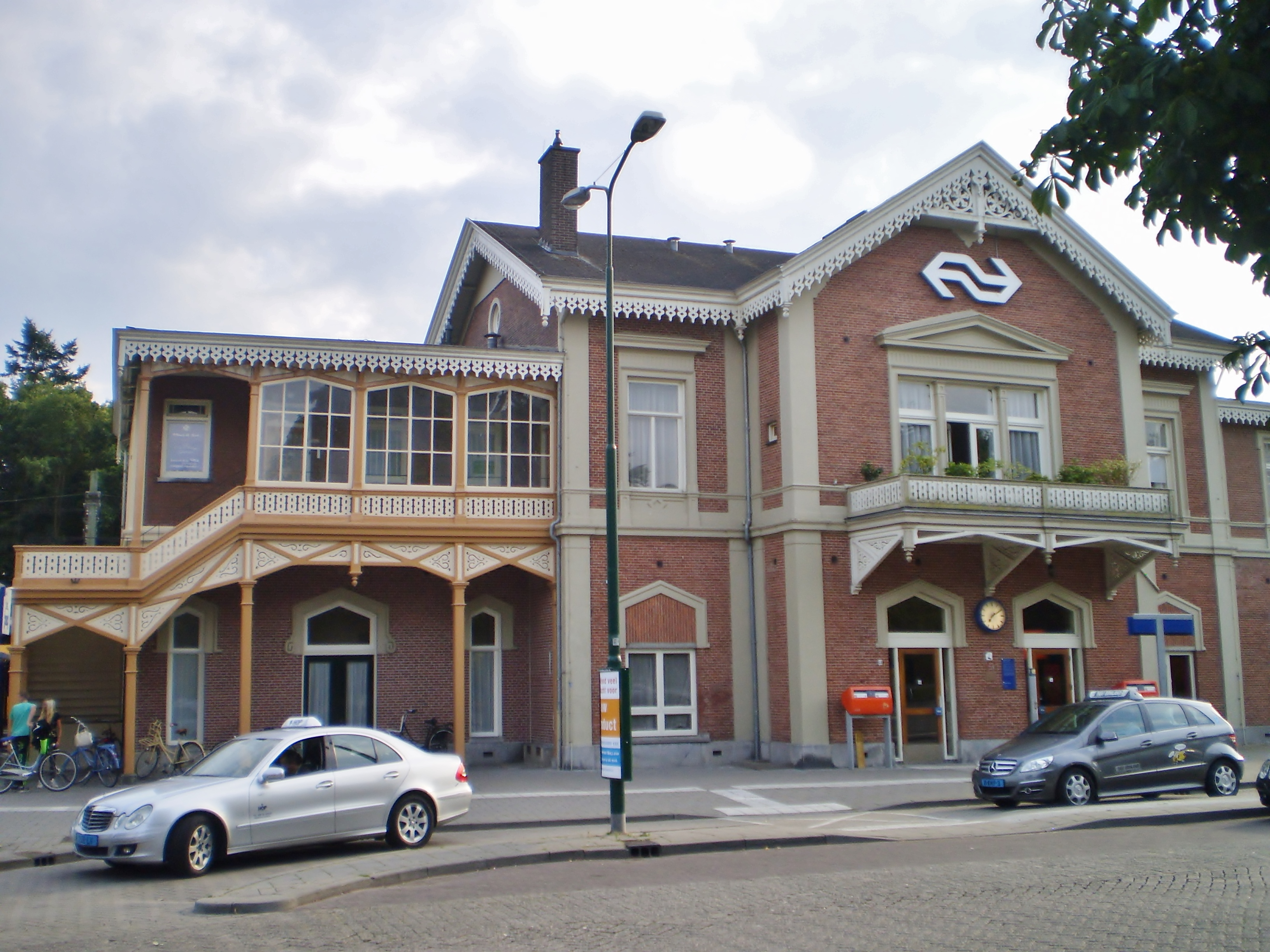

General information
- Location: Baarn, Netherlands
- Coordinates: 52°12′29″N 5°16′52″E
- Lines: Amsterdam–Zutphen railway Den Dolder–Baarn railway

History
- Opened: 10 June 1874

Services
Preceding station	Nederlandse Spoorwegen	Following station
Terminus	NS Sprinter 5500	Soestdijk towards Utrecht Centraal
Hilversum towards Amsterdam Centraal	NS Sprinter 5800	Amersfoort Centraal towards Amersfoort Vathorst
Location
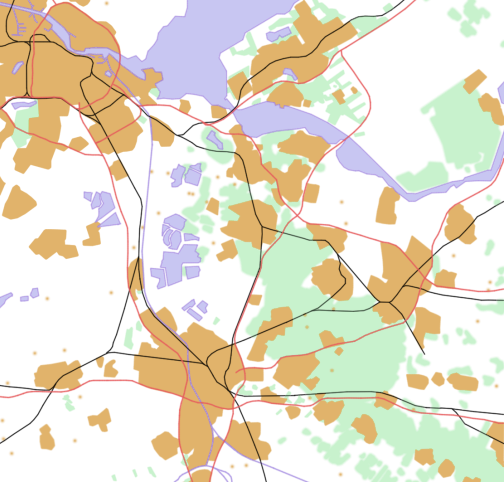
- Location within Northeastern Randstad

Baarn is a railway station on the Amsterdam–Zutphen railway and the Den Dolder–Baarn railway located in Baarn, Netherlands. The station is operated by the Nederlandse Spoorwegen (NS). The station was opened on 10 June 1874.

Baarn station is the station the Dutch monarchy uses for travel to Soestdijk Palace, and is one of three stations in the country with an active royal waiting room.

The station has four platforms. Platform 1, which is out of use, is joined to the station building. Platforms 2 and 3 form an island platform and are for trains to Amersfoort and Amsterdam. Platform 4 is used for trains to and from Utrecht Centraal.

In the early days, the HSM had a railway station, for trains to Amsterdam and Amersfoort, this was on the Oosterspoorweg, and the nearby station Baarn Buurtstation, which was for the train to Utrecht. In 1938 the companies became part of the station NS, however Baarn Buurtstation was not closed until the Stichtse lijn was electrified in 1948. The station was rebuilt, with a platform 4 for the Utrecht train, to prevent delays of Intercitys passing through the station. Since March 2009, platform 1 is no longer used for passenger services.

== Train services ==
The following train services call at Baarn:

Route	Service type	Notes
Utrecht - Baarn	Local ("Sprinter")	2x per hour
Amsterdam Centraal - Hilversum - Amersfoort Vathorst	Local ("Sprinter")	2x per hour

== Bus services ==
The station is served by lines 272, 572, 573 and N70.
