= Tree cathedral =

Method of landscaping

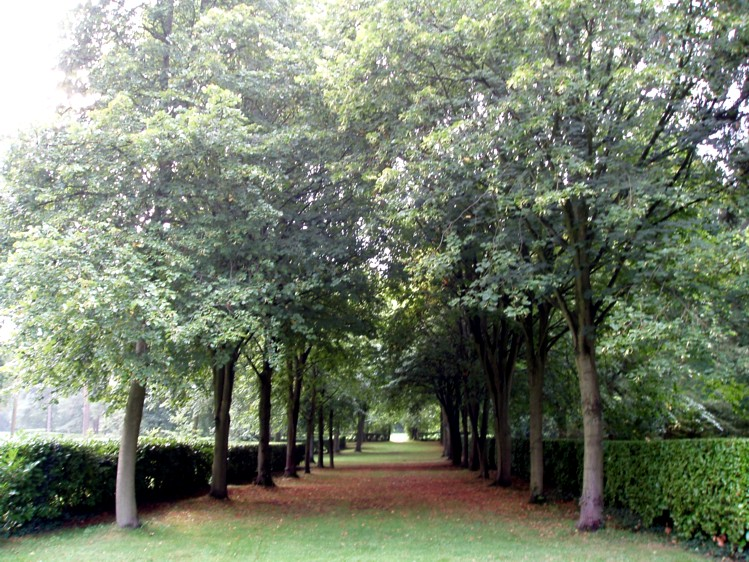
Nave of Whipsnade Tree Cathedral in 2005

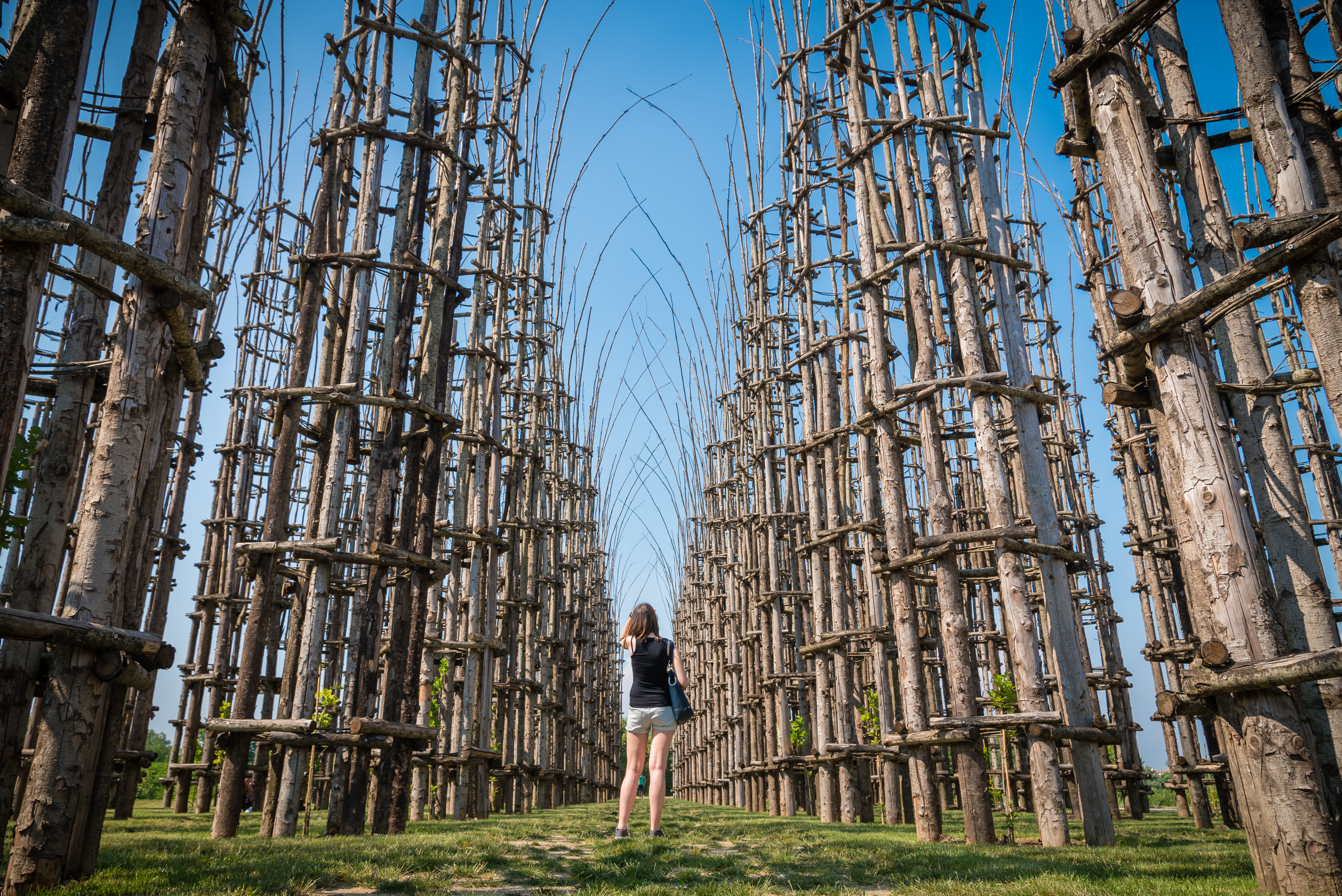
Lodi cattedrale vegetale in 2018

A tree cathedral is an arboretum laid out so the arrangement of the trees creates the typical architectural elements of the nave, chancel, and transepts usually constructed from masonry in a typical medieval cathedral.

Examples of tree cathedrals include:

- Whipsnade Tree Cathedral in Bedfordshire, England. It was planted from 1932 by the lawyer Edmond Blyth as a First World War memorial, inspired by Liverpool Anglican Cathedral. It was donated to the National Trust in 1960, and became a Grade II registered garden in 2017.
- The tree cathedral planted 1986 at Newlands, near Central Milton Keynes, to a design by the landscape architect Neil Higson, based on Norwich Cathedral.
- De Groene Kathedraal, Almere, Netherlands, based on Reims Cathedral
- The cattedrale vegetale at Malga Costa, in the Val di Sella in northern Italy, a project commenced in 2001 (see Arte Sella), and a second one at Lodi, Lombardy, for Expo 2015; both by the Italian artist Giuliano Mauri.
