= Whipsnade Tree Cathedral =

Garden in Bedfordshire

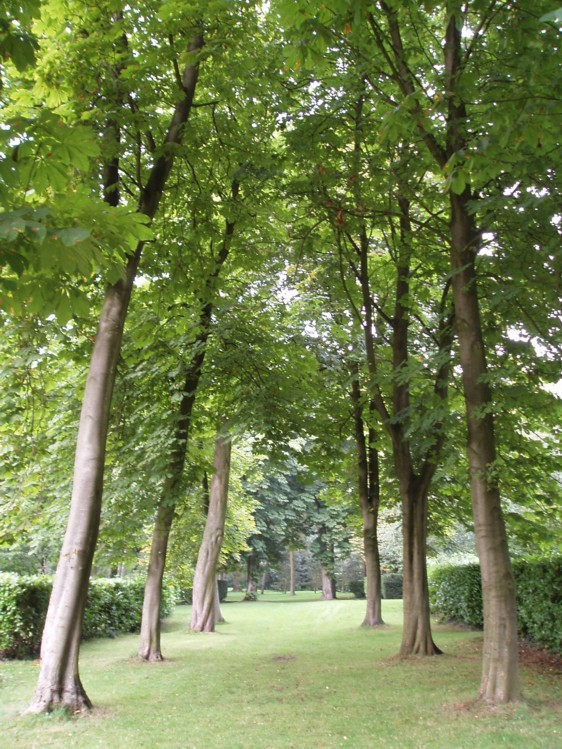
- The South Transept of Whipsnade Tree Cathedral

- Location within Bedfordshire Location within the United Kingdom
- Type: Garden
- Location: Whipsnade, Bedfordshire, England
- Coordinates: 51.85296°N 0.53740°W
- Area: 9.5-acre (3.8 ha)
- Established: 1930s
- Founder: Edmond Blyth

National Register of Historic Parks and Gardens
- Type: Grade I
- Designated: 10 February 2017
- Reference no.: 1439326

Whipsnade Tree Cathedral is a 9.5-acre (3.8 ha) garden in the village of Whipsnade in Bedfordshire, England. It is planted in the approximate form of a cathedral, with grass avenues for nave, chancel, transepts, chapels and cloisters and "walls" of different species of trees.

The tree cathedral was planned by Edmond Blyth in the 1930s as an act of "Faith, hope and reconciliation" in response to his memories of World War I. As a cadet at Sandhurst in 1916 Blyth had made close friends called Arthur Bailey, John Bennett and Francis Holland who were all killed prior to the end of the war. In 1930 he paid a visit to Liverpool Cathedral, which was then under construction. Blyth wrote: "As we drove south through the Cotswold hills on our way home... I saw the evening sun light up a coppice of trees on the side of a hill. It occurred to me then that here was something more beautiful still and the idea formed of building a cathedral with trees." Work began in 1932 and continued in stages. The site became overgrown during World War II, but development recommenced after the end of the war. The first religious service at the site was held on 6 June 1948, and services continue to this day. A book of signatures of those attending is maintained and updated each year.

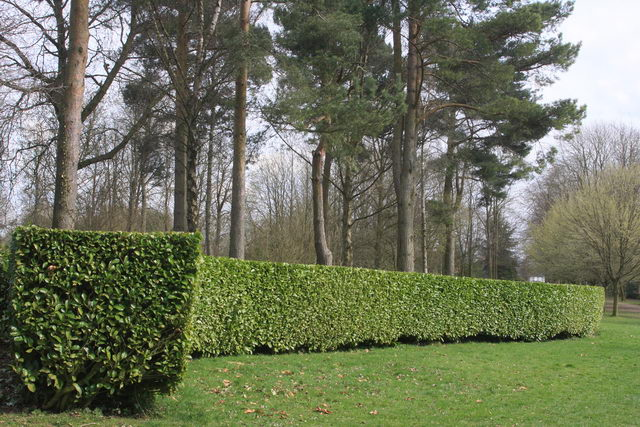
The outer "wall" of the cathedral

In 1960 the Tree Cathedral was accepted as a gift by the National Trust. The independent Whipsnade Tree Cathedral Fund is responsible for the religious use of the site. Services have been conducted by many different denominations. It is Grade II listed on the Register of Historic Parks and Gardens.

The Tree Cathedral contains chapels meant for each of the four seasons.

== Trees ==
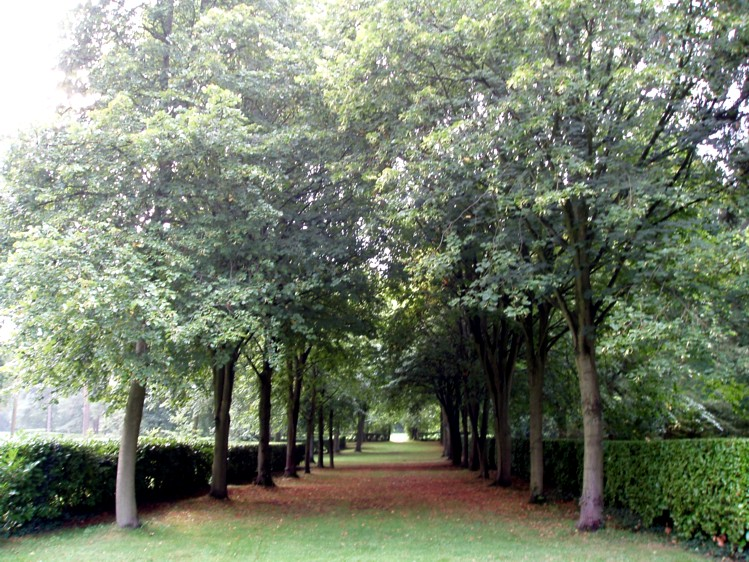
The Nave of Whipsnade Tree Cathedral

The cathedral incorporates the following trees.

- Ash (cloister walk)
- Beech (summer chapel, corner towers)
- Cherry
  - wild (autumn circle)
  - flowering (Easter chapel)
  - pillar (dew pond enclosure)
- Cedar
  - Deodar (north transept, Christmas chapel)
  - Atlantic (lady chapel)
- Cypress (dew pond enclosure)
- Hornbeam (south entrance avenue)
- Horse Chestnut (transepts, western approach)
- Lime (nave)
- Lombardy Poplar (corner towers)
- Norway Maple (Wallsam Way)
- Norway Spruce (Christmas chapel)
- Oak (south entrance, nave, Gospel Oak)
- Rowan (summer chapel)
- Silver Birch (chancel, corner towers)
- Scots Pine (corner towers, north transept, western approach)
- Whitebeam (south entrance, summer chapel)
- Willow (dew pond enclosure)
- Yew (summer chapel, Wallsam Way, chancel)

The site also includes a number of notable shrubs, including Berberis, Cotoneaster, Dogwood, Flowering Currant, Holly, Hazel, Lilac, Laurustinus, Laurel, May, New Zealand Holly, Philadelphus, Privet, Rhododendron, and Wild Rose.

== Nearby ==
Pam Ward (right) has been maintaining the cathedral since 1982, when she moved to Whipsnade. She was awarded an MBE by Prince William in 2024 for this and other volunteer work in the village.

The village of Whipsnade contains houses named after Mr Blyth (Blythswood) and his friends Arthur Bailey and John Bennett (Bailey Cottage and Bennetts Cottage).

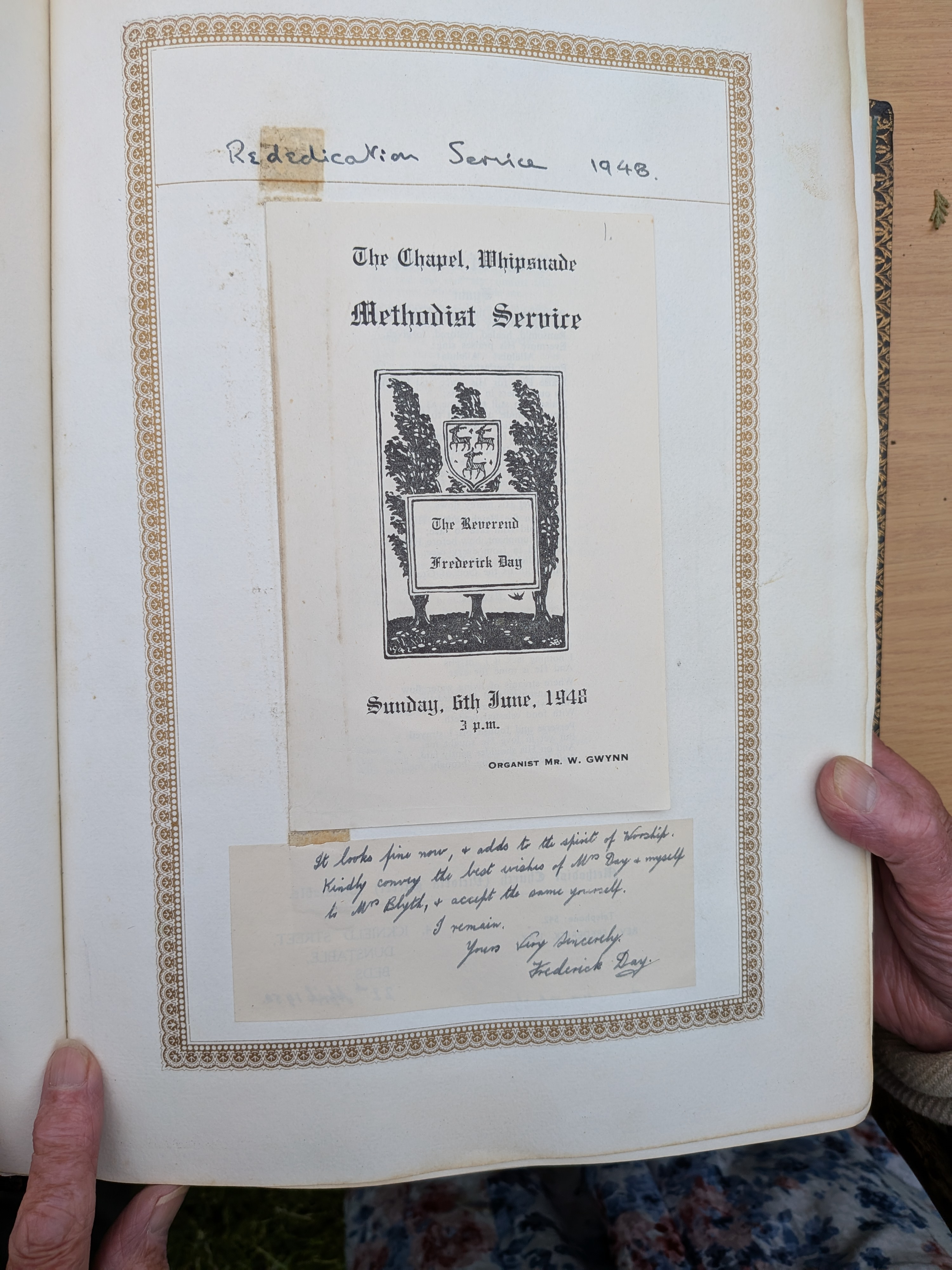
Memorial of first service held in 1948

The Icknield Way Path passes adjacent to the Tree Cathedral on its 110-mile (180 km) journey from Ivinghoe Beacon in Buckinghamshire to Knettishall Heath in Suffolk. The Icknield Way Trail, a multi-user route for walkers, horse riders and off-road cyclists also passes adjacent.
