= Slavery monument (Almere) =

2023 sculpture in Almere, Netherlands

Almere Slavery Monument
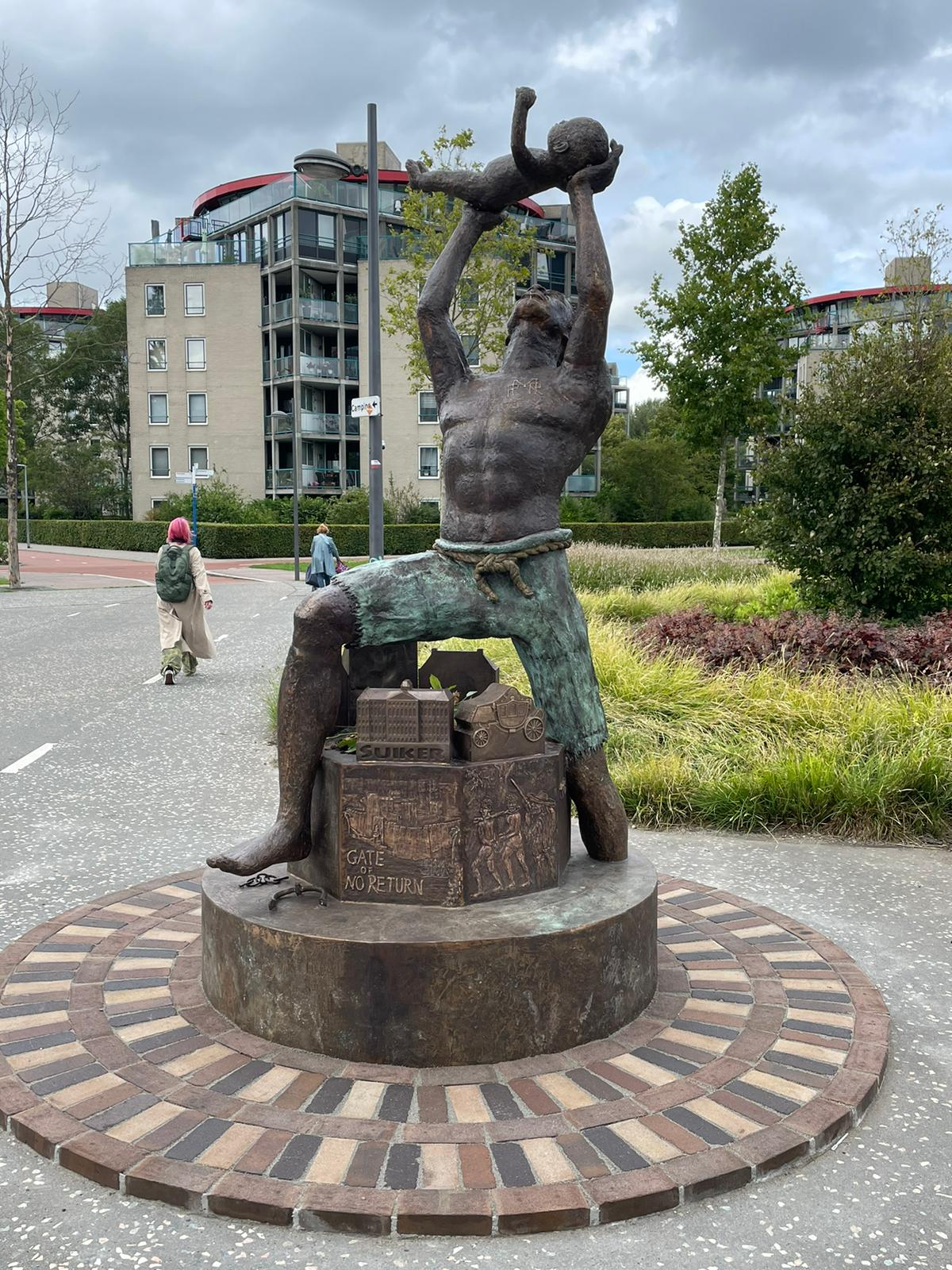
- 52°22′33.2″N 5°13′6.09″E
- Location: Almere, Flevoland, Netherlands
- Material: Bronze
- Height: 300 cm
- Dedicated date: June 30, 2023

The Almere Slavery Monument is a sculpture located at Mandelaplein in Almere, the Netherlands, created by artist Patrick Mezas. The monument was gifted to the city and its inhabitants to commemorate the abolition of slavery in 1863, which became effective in 1873.

== Background ==
The slavery monument was placed at the initiative of the Comité 30 juni/1 juli Flevoland, with support from the Almere municipality. It was unveiled by alderman Maaike Veeningen on Friday, June 30, 2023, during the Ketikoti commemoration.

The monument is centrally located at Mandelapark, near Almere Centrum station. The mayor of Almere, Hein van Loo, said about the monument: “I hope this monument will be a place where people come. For a moment of reflection and contemplation. Also, of inspiration, to never let slavery, as the most extreme form of discrimination, happen again.”

== Description ==
The slavery memorial monument is a bronze sculpture standing three meters tall, depicting a strong man with a bare chest who, after throwing off his chains, lifts his baby into the air towards a better future. He steps with one leg over the slavery past, depicted in various scenes such as Fort Elmina in Ghana, slave ships, and symbols of Dutch prosperity resulting from slavery, such as the Golden Coach and the Palace on the Dam. The other leg symbolically remains trapped in the past. The baby can also symbolize Almere, a young city where many people of diverse cultures and backgrounds live together.

The base of the sculpture can be used as a bench. Visitors can scan a QR code at the artwork to receive more information about the symbols and scenes depicted in the sculpture.

== See also ==
- List of slavery monuments in the Netherlands
- History of Dutch slavery
