= Almere Haven =

Coordinates: 52°20′22″N 5°13′13″E

Almere Harbor Almere Haven
- Borough of Almere
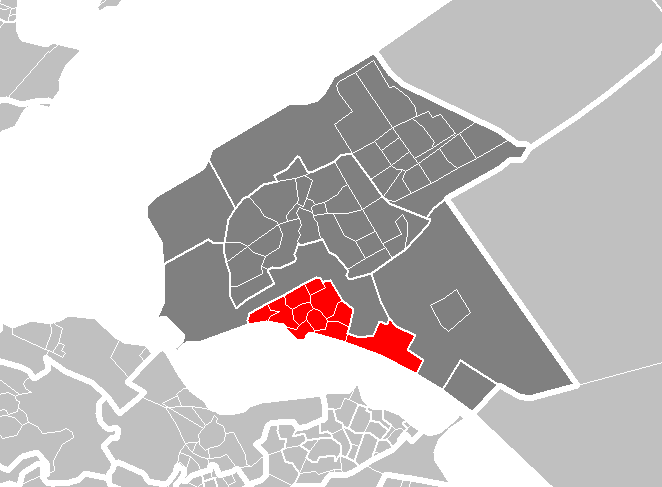
- Country: Netherlands
- Province: Flevoland
- Municipality: Almere

Population
  - Total: 22.820
- Demonym: Havenaar

Almere Haven is the oldest borough of Almere (although the first houses of Almere were built in the neighborhood now known as Oostvaardersdiep in Almere Buiten). Although Almere Haven does not have its own railway station, it is well-connected to Amsterdam and the rest of Almere by a good bus rapid transit system.

Almere Haven has a small harbour, as well as a marina and is surrounded by large forests of poplars containing buzzards, foxes, small deer, and owls. The closest forests are Beginbos and Waterlandsebos.

Almere Haven features a mall that, for the most part, closely resembles the downtown area of a small town. Along the moat called Kerkgracht (inside the mall), it also features canal houses, which resemble old canal houses found in Downtown Amsterdam. This was done to make the first citizens (in 1975) feel at home, as they were people who had previously lived in Amsterdam.

The first permanent building inside the mall was the multifunctional building De Roef, which closed down a long time ago. The building is still actively used; currently it is home to a Vögele Mode store.

The first permanent school of Almere (Haven) was built in 1978 in the neighborhood De Werven. Its name was De Bijenkorf. As more schools were built in Almere and younger people and families settled in other parts of the city, De Bijenkorf became less important and eventually ended up with just a handful of teachers. Therefore, it was up for closure. However, instead of closing, the building burned down in December 1993 because people threw firecrackers through the mailbox. The police found out who those people were, but they never prosecuted them. The building was never restored. No trace of the building remains today because in the early 2000s, houses were built on top of the former school site.

The first neighborhood of Almere Haven is De Werven. Among other houses and other things, it features a lot of greenery, a big park called Stadswerfpark, a sports center with an external playground (Playground Stadswerfpark) specifically for sports (like a soccer field and basketball court) and a public pool building. It also features a big supervised playground called De Speelhaven.

Almere Haven features the most idealistic architecture in Almere, when the goal was to build a model city on the newly reclaimed land of Flevoland. The city was planned before increasing population pressure in Almere and rising property prices caused compromises on the original vision.

Almost all housing developments are built to provide views of greenery and open spaces, and each group of houses is clustered around a little park (although this concept has changed in newer areas), usually with easy access to the surrounding forests, so most residents of Almere Haven do not have the sense of living in a crowded urban area.

The urban area of Almere Haven does not have the inconveniences of busy traffic, car pollution, and road noise because all roads are cul-de-sacs connecting to a well-hidden ring road that provides the only car access in and out of Almere Haven, although there are sometimes traffic jams in rush hours on said ring roads (especially on the ring road Noorderdreef). The bus rapid transit system contains a large loop throughout the borough with a bus stop in almost every neighborhood.
