= The Green Cathedral =

Artwork by Marinus Boezem in Almere

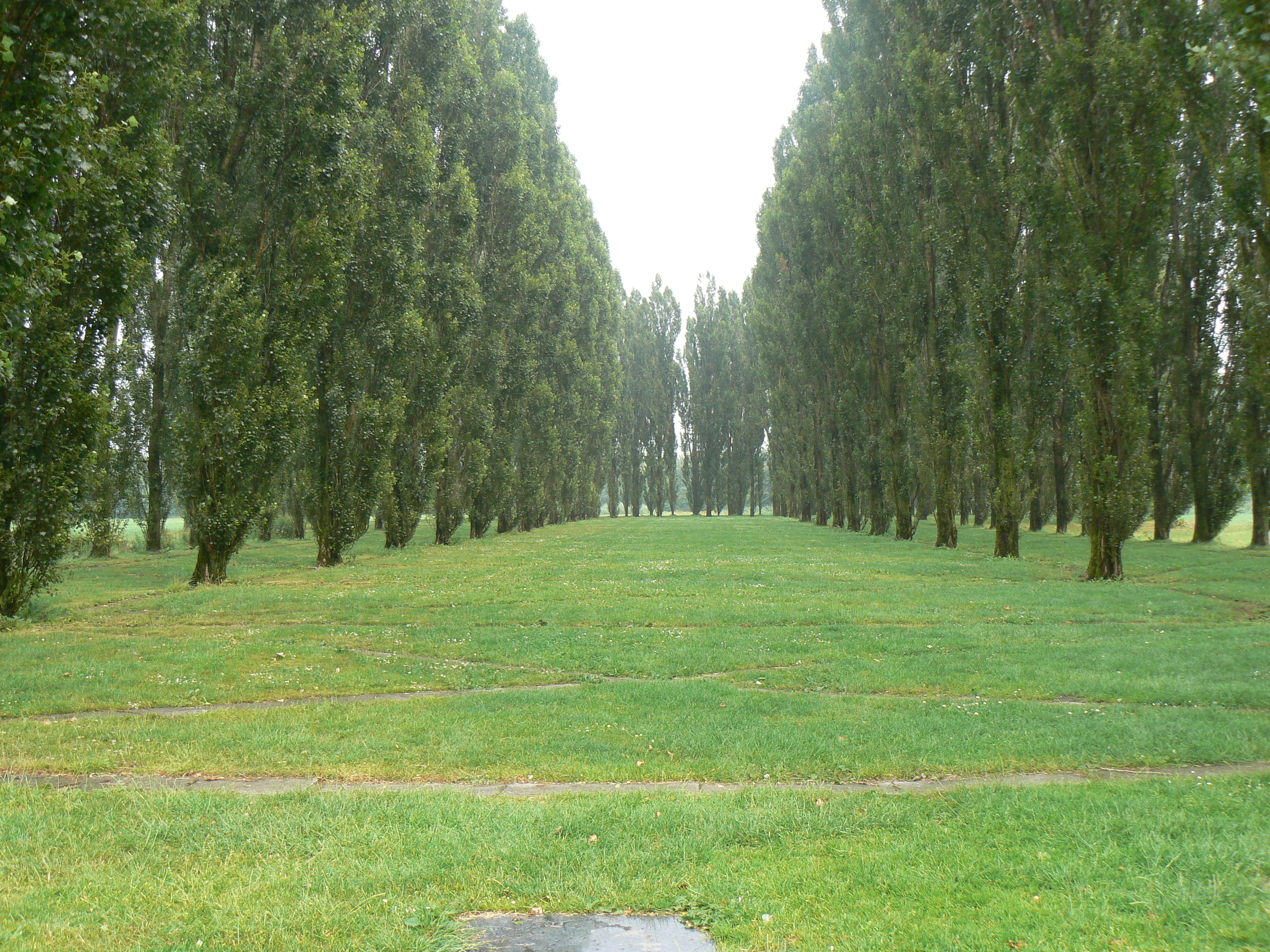
The Green Cathedral, by Marinus Boezem (July 2009)

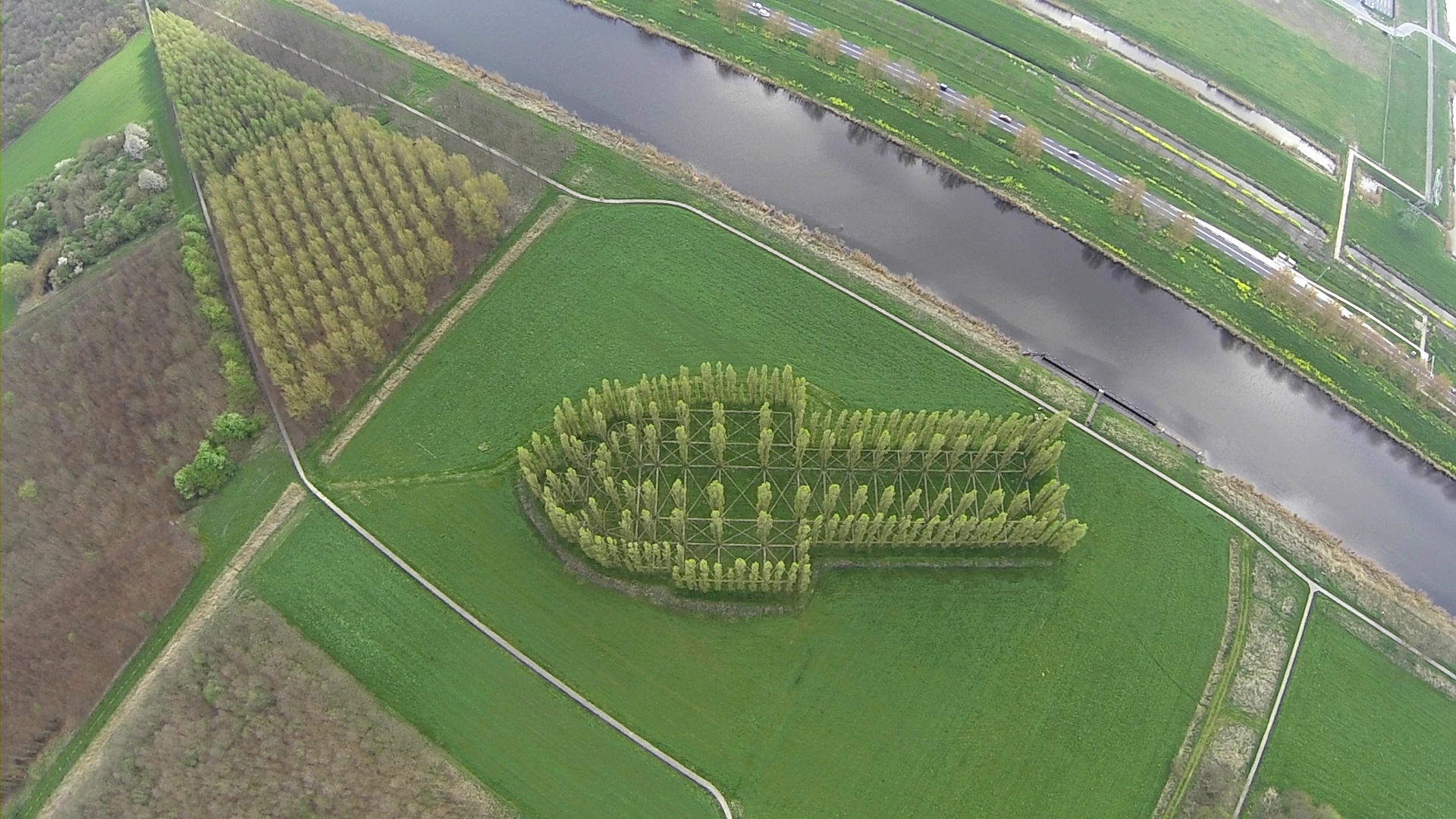
Aerial view

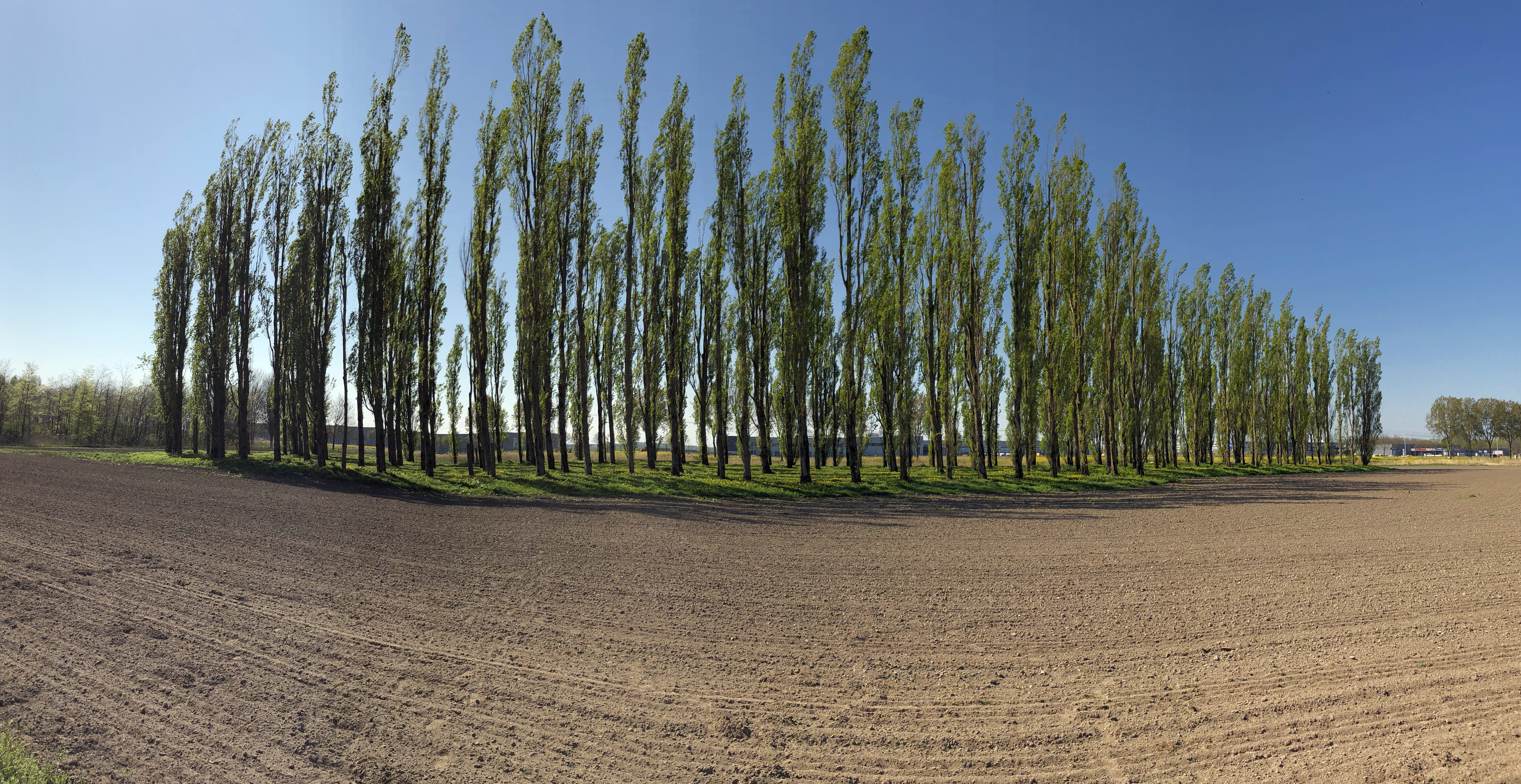
Panorama of The Green Cathedral in 2019.

The Green Cathedral or De Groene Kathedraal located near Almere in the Netherlands, is an artistic planting of Lombardy poplars (Populus nigra italica) that mimics the size and shape of the Cathedral of Notre-Dame, Reims, France. The Green Cathedral is 150 m (490 ft) long and 75 m (246 ft) wide, and the mature poplar trees are about 30 m (98 ft) tall.

== History ==
The work was planted by Marinus Boezem (b. 1934) on April 16, 1987, in Southern Flevoland. The land art project was installed on polder land; 178 trees were planted on a knoll, a half-metre above the surrounding area. Over the following years, some trees were replaced due to deer damage, and stone was laid in the floor to echo the cross ribs and support beams of the cathedral.

== 21st century ==
Now mature, the cathedral has become a location for weddings, funerals, meetings, and religious services of all kinds. Nearby, a clearing has been made in a young beech forest so that the open space is in the shape of the same cathedral. Boezem suggests, as the poplars decline, the beech trees around the clearing will grow to create the church once more, thus ensuring a cyclical evolution of growth, decline, and growth.

== Art ==
There have also been art performances by theater group Suburbia called Judas (2015), Performance Melanie Bonajo - Matrix Botanica, Biosphere Above Nations (2013)

== See also ==
- Tree cathedral, similar structures around the world.
