= Marinus Boezem =

Dutch artist (born 1934)

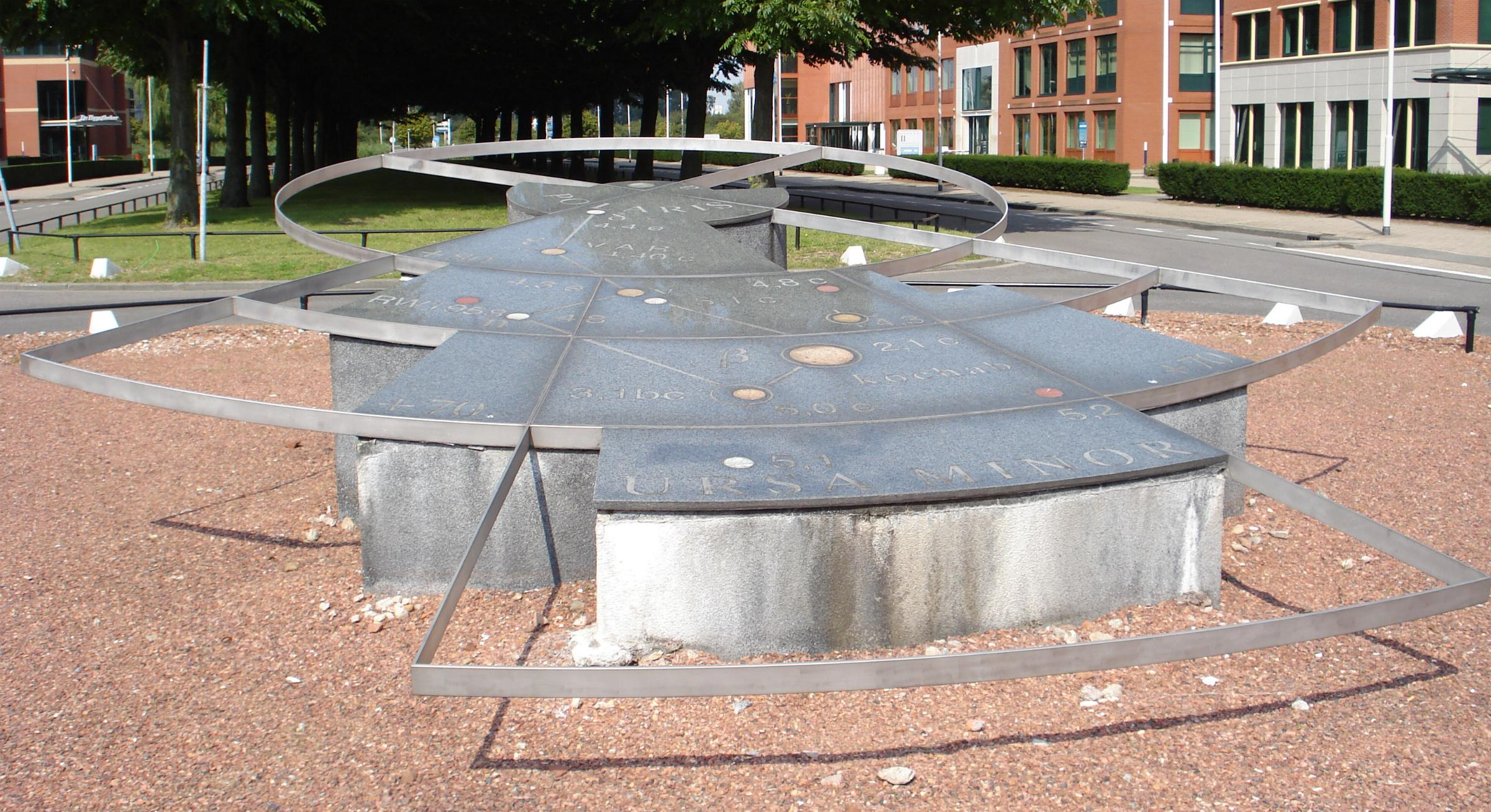
Marinus Boezem, Polaris & Octans, 1997, Brainpark in Kralingen, Rotterdam

Marinus Lambertus van den Boezem (born 28 January 1934) is a Dutch artist. He is known for his radical view of art and his works in public space. Together with Wim T. Schippers, Ger van Elk and Jan Dibbets, Boezem is seen as one of the main representatives of conceptual art and arte povera in the Netherlands in the late 1960s.

== Biography ==
Boezem was born in Leerdam. In 1934, he entered the Vrije Academie Artibus in Utrecht, but he left after a year to continue his studies at the Vrije Academie in The Hague. At the Academie, his interests lay mostly in works on the flat surface. In the 1950s, he worked as a drawer and painter. In the 1960s, his work became more spatial. He started to work on non-material works, sculptures, spatial objects and works in public space and he became known and respected by a growing public. Boezems work is unmistakably rooted in the 1960s, when Nouveau Réalisme in Europe and Pop Art in America had a great influence on many artists. Like the Nouveau Réalistes, Boezem and other Dutch artists such as Ger van Elk, Jan Dibbets, Wim T. Schippers and Willem de Ridder were opposed to art that was spiritual, outside society and based on craftsmanship. Boezems works often contain non-artistic objects and parts of landscapes. Some of his works comprise only an idea or a proposal for an object. The proposals consisted of spatial sculptures made of air and other materials, such as cotton wool and reeds, hardly ever used for art. Like a businessman Boezem carried his proposals in a briefcase and travelled to museums and galleries to sell them. Like his contemporaries Boezem strove to bring art outside the walls of the museum. Many of his works were not suitable to be placed in a museum. In 1960 Boezem exhibited part of a polder as a ready made. With this artwork, he presented himself for the first time as a "conceptual" artist.

From the mid-1970s, Boezem began to work out his conceptual ideas in sculpture. In his sculptures the role of the environment played an important role. Themes as air, light, sound and movement, which were the central themes in his early work, remained leading motives in his sculptures. In the 1970s teaching became also an important part of Boezem's activities. Out of an idealistic belief in art for everyone, and scepticism about the art world, he devoted himself to what was then called 'non-formal education'. In the 1980s he worked on several major projects in which the landscape plays an important role. His greatest and most important project in this period is The Green Cathedral (1978–1987). For this artwork, 174 Italian poplars have been planted in a polder landscape in Flevoland. The trees reproduce the floorplan of the Gothic Cathedral of Reims. Many of Boezem's spatial work can be placed in the tradition of Land Art. Motifs such as landscapes, space, climate, light, air and cartography play a central role in Boezem's work. In the 1990s he made several video works, but also many sculptures in public space.

Especially his work from the 1960s, gave Boezem an international reputation. As one of the first Dutch conceptual artists he had a major impact on the development of art in the Netherlands and abroad.

== Works and exhibitions ==
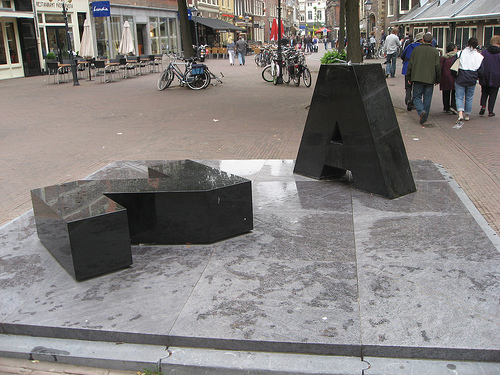
AZ (memorial for Lennaert Nijgh), 2007, Haarlem

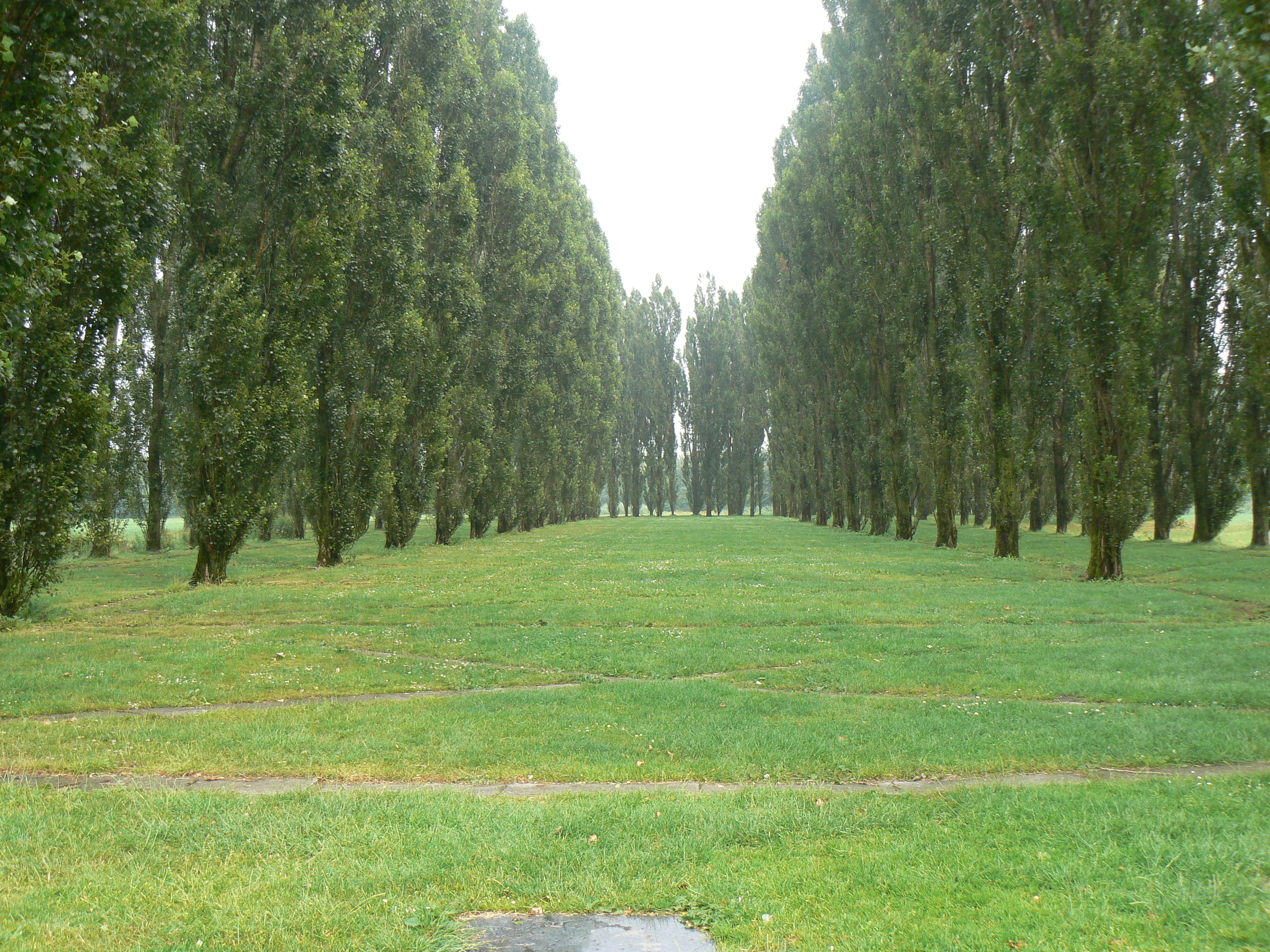
The Green Cathedral (July 2009), Flevopolder

The shows (1964–1969), a coherent series of drawings, intended as proposals for installations which could be realized in a museum on order, are characteristic for Boezems early period and illustrate the conceptual nature of his work. The drawings are simple design sketches for exhibition projects, which Boezem stenciled in multiple editions and sent to people in art circles. Typed instructions were enclosed with the drawings. In Show V Boezem does a proposal for an exhibition space. In this show, various air doors are placed where people can walk through them. People here have the experience of warmth, air and cold. The air doors arise as currents of cold and warm are blown in the room.

In 1969 Boezem took part in two important exhibitions which have laid the ground for innovative art movements such as Conceptual Art, Minimalism, Arte Povera and Land Art. For the exhibition Op losse schroeven (On loose screws) organised by Wim Beeren and Edy de Wilde at the Stedelijk Museum in Amsterdam, Boezem hung white bed sheets out of the first floor windows of the museum to function as a wind vane, to indicate the changing patterns of the wind and weather, but also to mock the Dutch habit of placing the bedding in the open window of one's house to dry. In this exhibitions Boezem's work was displayed along with that of other Dutch and international artists including Walter De Maria, Mario Merz, Bruce Nauman, Robert Smithson and Gibertio Zorio. With his project Boezem brought art into a public space and public space is incorporated into the realm of art. This strategy is typical of the nature of works that were being exhibited at that time. The second exhibition When Attitudes Become Form was held at the Kunsthalle in Bern. Here Boezem's work was shown in the company of famous artists such as Carl Andre, Joseph Beuys, Richard Serra, Richard Long and Lawrence Weiner. The intangible and often philosophically oriented works at both exhibitions were a revolution in the art world.

In 1971 Marinus Boezem participated in Sonsbeek 71 Buiten de Perken, an exhibition in Park Sonsbeek in Arnhem, which included artists from around the world, with an emphasis on site-specific and "audio-visual" works, including film and video. For this exhibition Boezem sent in a proposal for an intervention in nature. His idea was to install an apparatus used in orchards to scare away birds during the harvest season. The apparatus should produce a bang at adjustable intervals. Because of insurmountable objections from the environmental movement the plan was not realized and replaced by a filmproject of the Hooglandse kerk in Leiden.

In 1979 the performance L'Uomo Volante takes place in De Vleeshal exhibition space in Middelburg, during the opening of Boezems solo exhibition Space Sculptures. The body of Marinus Boezem is one of the materials in this work. Boezem is dressed in a sort of airman's suit. Behind him stands a mirror which he holds in uneasy balance by means of ropes slung over his shoulders. A tense balance exists until he can no longer hold the weight and has to let go. The mirror is dashed to pieces on the floor. The Gothic vault of De Vleeshal is reflected in the fragments. The Gothic arch motif is frequently found in Boezem's work, as in Etude Gothique (1985). This sculpture lies in the middle of a marketplace in the city centre of 's-Hertogenbosch. It is a thirty-centimeter-high podium of polished granite terrazzo in the form of a gothic arch. The sculpture acts as though it were the shadow of an imaginary arch. It lies at a point where the most important functions of the old city come together. That is on one side it points in the direction of the St. Jans Cathedral (religion), on the other side the sculpture offers a view of the Stadhuis (government). The marketplace where the work is situated lies in the middle of a shopping area and is a place of economic activity (economy). The sculpture has also a social purpose in the urban space because it can function as a seat.

In 1998 Boezems designs the sculpture Polaris & Octans for the urban office park Brainpark near Rotterdam. The sculpture consists of two sculptures which are engraved with fragments of the northern and southern celestial map. They symbolize, as the title already suggests, the region around the northern polestar (Polaris) and the southern polestar (Octans). The two poles, sometimes called the gates to heaven, respond to the surrounding, a brainpark where new developments in technique and design are made.

In 1999 three different exhibitions were held simultaneously in The Netherlands, in honor of Boezem's 65th anniversary. The Kröller-Müller Museum represented his early work, Museum Paviljoens in Almere showed his landscape-related work. For De Vleeshal in Middelburg Boezem made a new work that contained numerous references to both the early and the landscaping work.

Boezem's recent work are mainly sculptures. In 2007 he was commissioned by the municipality of Haarlem to make a sculpture in honor of lyricist Lennaert Nijgh (1945–2002). He made a marble statue with the letters A and Z, which symbolize the texts Nijgh wrote. The sculpture AZ is placed after the replanning in 2006 and 2007 of the ‘’Oude Groenmarkt’’ in Haarlem.

In 2016, Boezem created site-specific works for the Oude Kerk, Amsterdam. Following through with his previous work on gothic cathedrals, the exhibition and public programme were a sort of retrospective of the artist's performances, filmography, and themes from previous exhibitions, mainly his interest in height. In this church, the oldest building in Amsterdam, he created new work in which visitors disappeared and reappeared. Boezem approached the idea of the building as a vehicle or conveyor that lifts individuals from their earthly existence – sometimes literally, using the principle of the force of gravity. The crux of this exhibition was Boezem’s new work, which transported visitors to the top of the church up to the highest church window – like a deus ex machina. From a dizzying height they could view the monumental church from a whole new perspective, where the artist had left them a message up on high. Initially running from 24 November 2016 to 26 March 2017, the exhibition was extended one month, ending on 30 April 2017.

== Museums ==
Boezems work is displayed in numerous public collections, including the:

- Museum Boijmans Van Beuningen, Rotterdam
- Stedelijk Museum, Amsterdam
- Kröller-Müller Museum, Otterlo
- Museum of Modern Art, New York
- The Corcoran Gallery of Art, Washington D.C.
- Empress Place Museum, Singapore
- Van Abbemuseum, Eindhoven
- Brooklyn Museum, New York City
- Museum of Contemporary Art, Chicago
- Municipal Museum of Fine Arts, Kioto
- Royal Institute of British Architects Gallery, London

== Literature ==
- Van Duyn, Edna en Witteveen, Frans Josef. Boezem. Oeuvre Catalogus. Bussum: Thoth Publishers, 1999. ISBN 978-90-6868-222-9
- Rattemeyer, Christian et al. Exhibiting the New Art. 'Op Losse Schroeven' and 'When Attitudes Become Form' 1969. London: Afterall Books, 2010. ISBN 978-1-84638-074-7
- Donker Duyvis, Paul. Boezem: XX Bienal 1989 São Paulo-Holanda. The Hague: Netherlands Office for Fine Arts, 1989.
- Van Duyn, Edna. Polaris & Octans. Uitgave van het CBK Rotterdam, 1998.
- McEvilly, Thomas. Marinus Boezem. Washington, DC: The Corcoran Gallery of Art, 1993. ISBN 0-88675-093-3
- Holeczek, Bernhard, Marinus Boezem. La Lumiere Cistercienne Clairvaux. Ludwigshafen am Rhein: Wilhelm-Hack Museum, 1987.
