= Almere =

- City and municipality
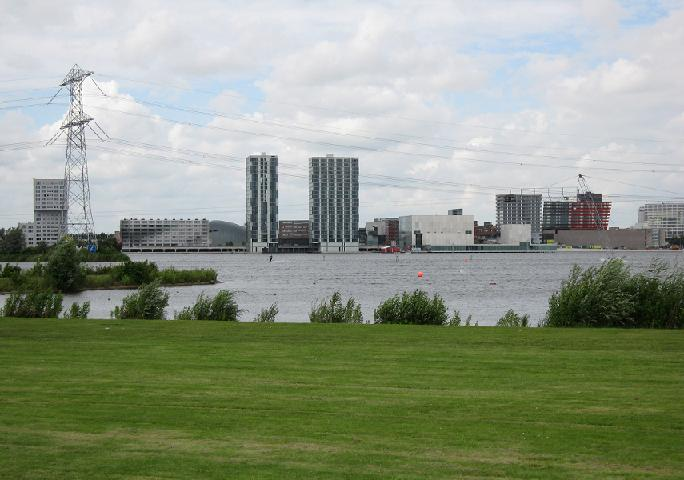
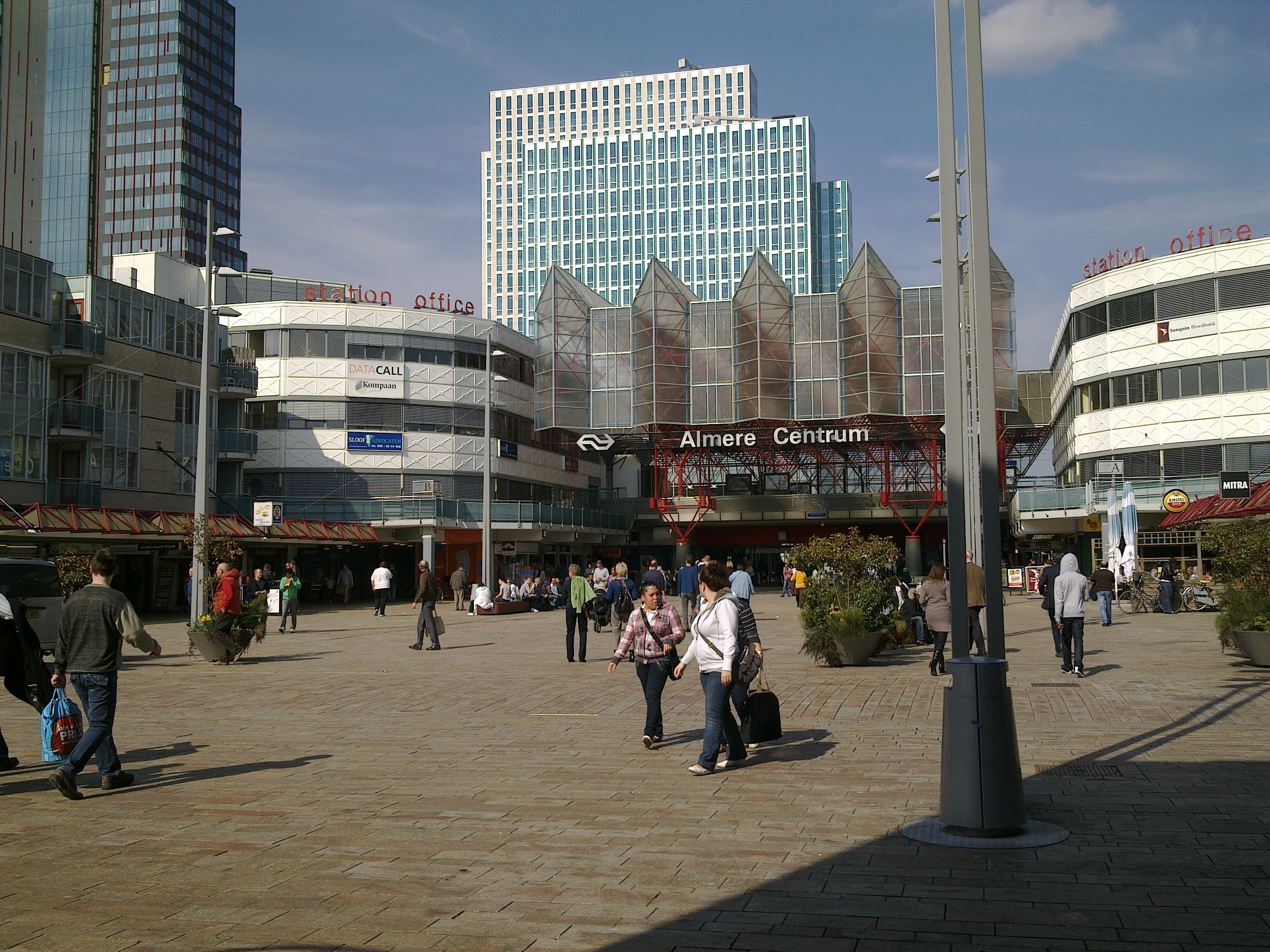
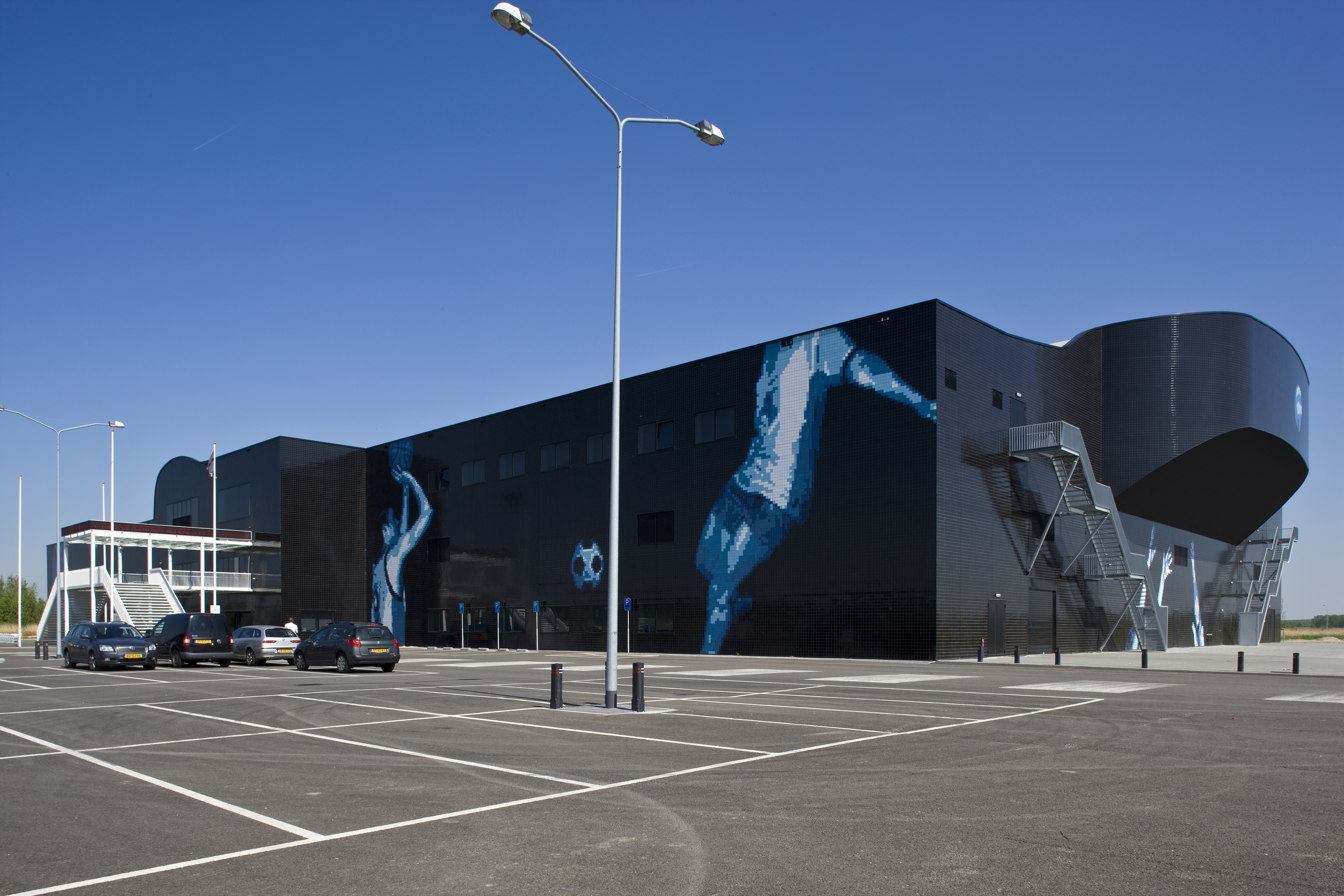
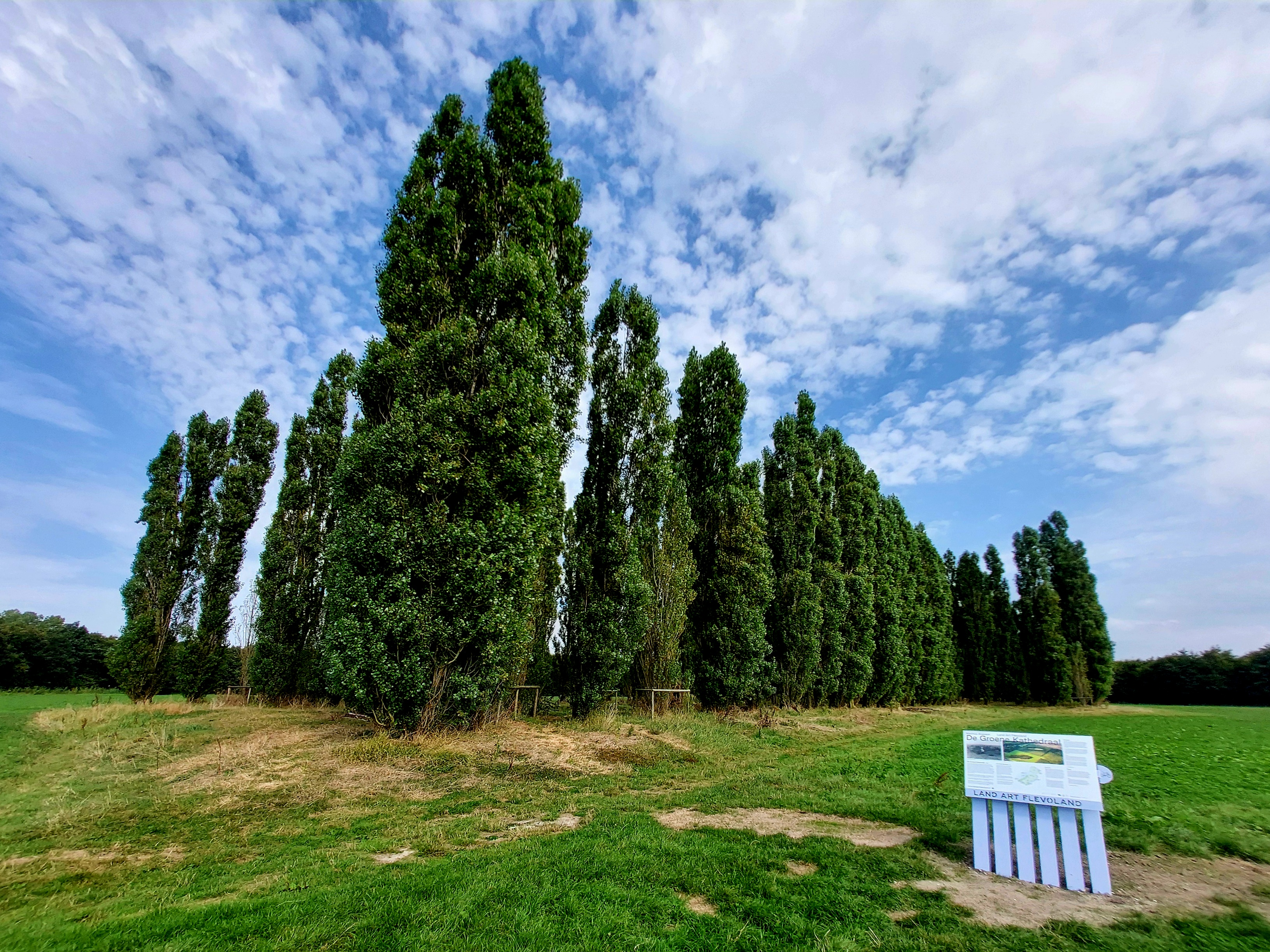
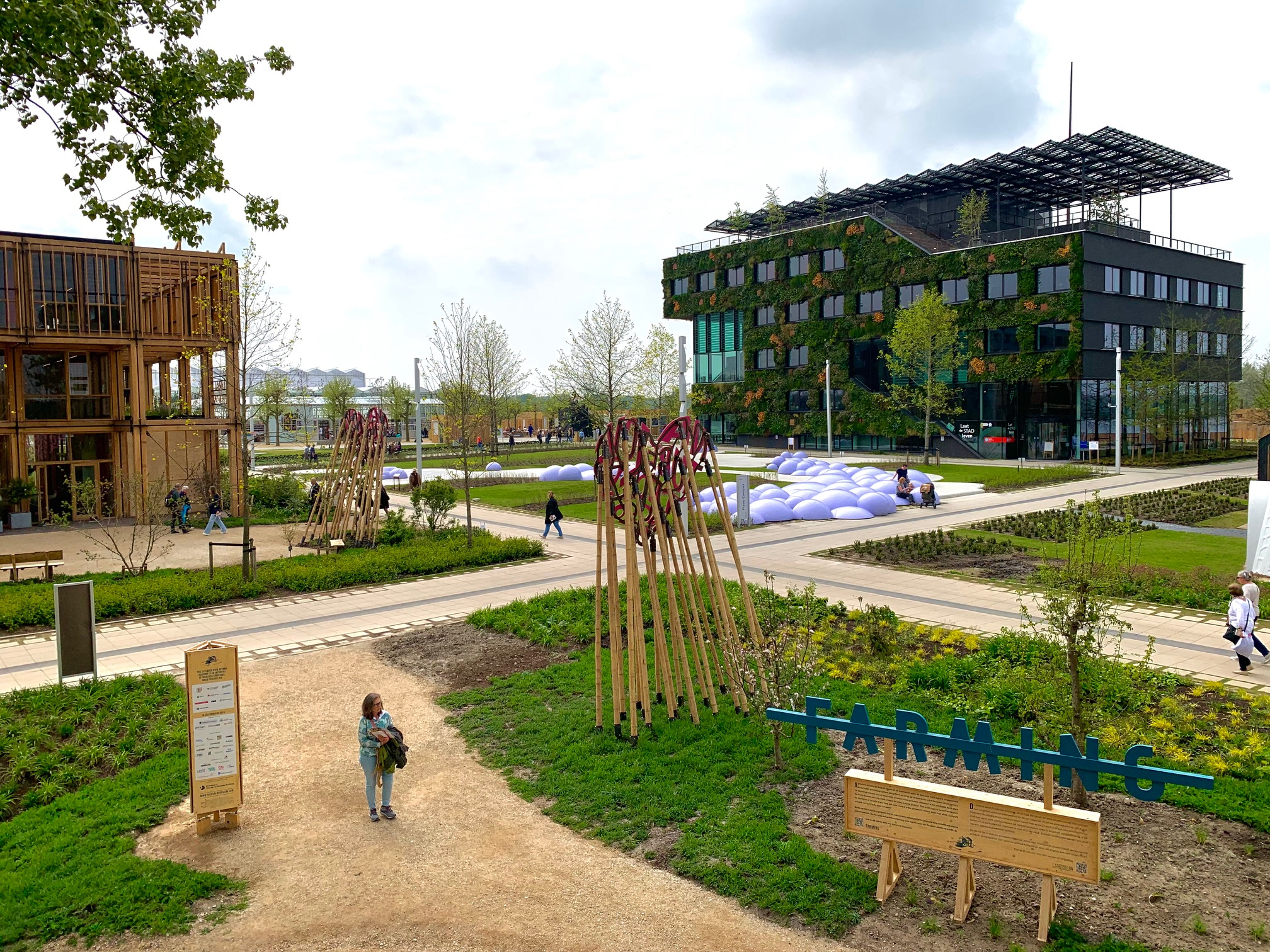
- Skyline with the Weerwater Almere Centrum railway station Topsportcentrum The Green Cathedral Floriade 2022

- Flag Coat of arms Brandmark

- Location in Flevoland
- Interactive map of Almere
- Location within the Netherlands Location within Europe
- Coordinates: 52°22′N 5°13′E
- Country: Netherlands
- Province: Flevoland
- Region: Amsterdam metropolitan area

Government
  - Body: Municipal council
  - Mayor: Hein van der Loo (Ind.)

Area
  - Total: 248.77 km^{2} (96.05 sq mi)
  - Land: 129.19 km^{2} (49.88 sq mi)
  - Water: 119.58 km^{2} (46.17 sq mi)
- Elevation: −3 m (−9.8 ft)

Population (January 2026)
  - Total: 232,619
  - Density: 1,801/km^{2} (4,660/sq mi)
- Demonym: Almeerder
- Time zone: UTC+1 (CET)
  - Summer (DST): UTC+2 (CEST)
- Postcode: 1300–1379
- Area code: 036
- Website: www.almere.nl

Almere (Dutch: [ɑlˈmeːrə]) is a planned city and municipality in Flevoland, Netherlands, across the IJmeer from Amsterdam.

Bordering Lelystad and Zeewolde, the municipality of Almere comprises six boroughs: Almere Stad (which is further split up into Almere Stad Oost, Almere Stad West and Almere Centrum), Almere Buiten, Almere Pampus (which is currently being designed), Almere Haven, Almere Hout and Almere Poort. Four of them feature official district or borough offices. Furthermore, the city also comprises the unofficial historic district and neighbourhood Oostvaardersdiep. Almere is part of the Amsterdam Metropolitan Area.

Almere is the newest city in the Netherlands. The land on which the city was built, the Southern Flevoland polder, was reclaimed from the IJsselmeer from 1959 to 1968. The first house was constructed in 1976, and Almere became a municipality eight years later. The city is the eighth largest in the Netherlands, and it is the largest settlement in Flevoland by population with 229,574 inhabitants (CBS; 2025). In October 2007, the city council of Almere had made agreements with the government to expand the city to 350,000 inhabitants by 2030.

== History ==
The original plans for the IJsselmeerpolders saw the land being used for agriculture. This changed in the early 1960's according to the Dutch Central Bureau for Statistics. After World War II housing was needed for the rapidly growing population of Amsterdam and two towns were planned in the polders Oostelijk Flevoland and Zuidelijk Flevoland. The town in Oostelijk Flevoland became Lelystad. The town in Zuidelijk Flevoland was still called Zuidweststad (English: South West City) on the first sketches; but in the 1970s it became called Almere, named after the lake Almere, the early medieval name of the Zuiderzee. The first house in Almere was finished in 1976. At that time the town was still controlled by the Openbaar Lichaam Zuidelijke IJsselmeerpolders (Z.IJ.P.), with a Landdrost. In 1984 Almere became an official municipality, a year before the official establishment of its province, Flevoland. Originally, Almere was envisioned as a town with multiple centres. This idea was later abandoned in favour of allowing neighbourhoods like Tussen de Vaarten to be built. There is also a difference between the way houses are built in the oldest and the newest parts of the city. The housing plan in Almere in the 1970s was basic functionality and a levelling of social status. However, starting in the 1990s more exclusive homes with striking designs were built (notably in the Regenboogbuurt).

== Governance ==
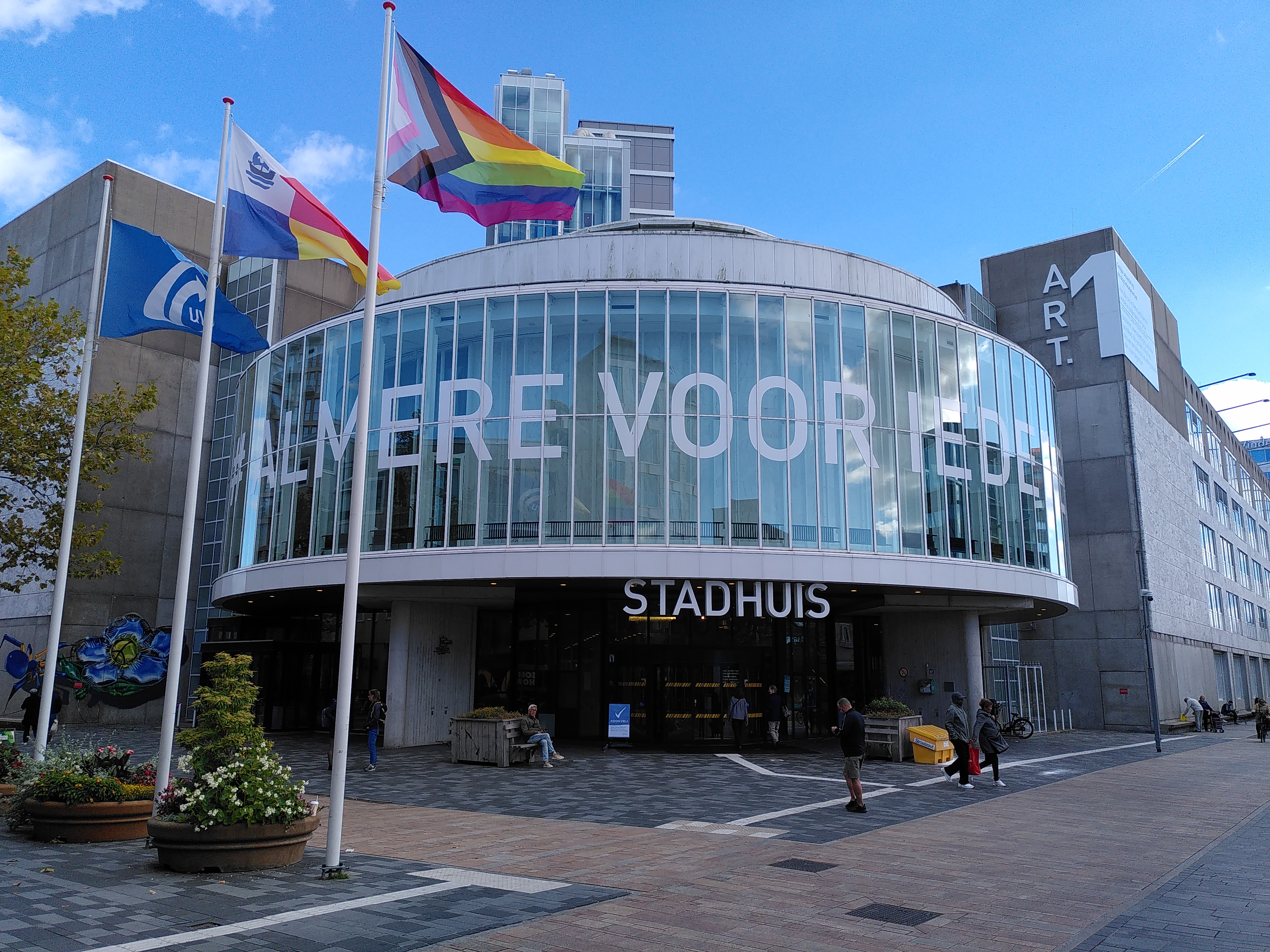
The town hall of the municipality of Almere. The building is located on the Stadhuisplein.

=== Local executive ===
Hein van der Loo (independent) has been mayor of Almere since March 2023, with the municipal council consisting of a coalition of several parties.

==== List of mayors ====
- 1984–1986: Han Lammers (PvdA)
- 1986–1993: Cees de Cloe (PvdA)
- 1993–1994: Cees Roozemond (PvdA, acting)
- 1994–1998: Ralph Pans (PvdA)
- 1998–2003: Hans Ouwerkerk (PvdA)
- 2003–2003: Jaap van der Doef (PvdA, acting)
- 2003–2015: Annemarie Jorritsma (VVD)
- 2015–2022: Franc Weerwind (D66)
- 2022–2023: Ank Bijleveld (CDA, acting)
- 2023-current: Hein van der Loo (independent)

=== Municipal council ===
The first municipal council was installed on 2 January 1984 in the presence of the then-Minister of the Interior Koos Rietkerk. The council elections took place on 21 September 1983. Prior to 1984 Almere had an Adviesraad, which was chosen every 2 years (1978–1980, 1980–1982, 1982–1984). This Adviesraad was made up of different political parties similar to a local council. On 11 March 1977 the first adviescommissie was elected. It consisted of 5 people that were chosen on personal title. Since 2018, the council of Almere has comprised a total of 45 members.

Party	1990	1994	1998	2002	2006	2010	2014	2018	2022	2026
Labour Party/GroenLinks	-	-	-	-	-	-	-	-	-	8
Labour Party	9	6	9	7	12	8	5	7	4	*
GroenLinks	3	4	4	4	3	3	2	4	3	*
People's Party for Freedom & Democracy	7	10	12	8	7	7	5	8	6	5
Democrats 66	7	10	5	2	1	3	6	5	4	5
Party for Freedom	-	-	-	-	-	9	9	6	5	4
Forum for Democracy	-	-	-	-	-	-	-	-	2	4
JA21	-	-	-	-	-	-	-	-	-	4
Christian Democratic Appeal	4	3	3	4	3	2	2	2	2	3
Leefbaar Almere	-	-	-	9	4	3	4	3	3	3
50PLUS	-	-	-	-	-	-	-	-	2	3
Socialist Party	-	-	-	-	4	2	4	3	4	2
Party for the Animals	-	-	-	-	-	-	-	3	3	1
Christian Union	-	-	1	1	2	1	1	2	2	1
Almere Partij/OPA	2	2	3	2	2	-	1	1	1	1
DENK	-	-	-	-	-	-	-	-	1	1
BIJ1	-	-	-	-	-	-	-	-	2	0
Respect Almere	-	-	-	-	-	-	-	1	1	0
Trots op Nederland	-	-	-	-	-	1	-	-	-	0
Verenigde Senioren Partij	-	-	1	1	1	-	-	-	-	0
Stadspartij Almere	-	-	1	1	-	-	-	-	-	0
Centrumdemocraten	1	2	-	-	-	-	-	-	-	0
Stap '84	1	-	-	-	-	-	-	-	-	0
Total	33	37	39	39	39	39	39	45	45	45

* Labour/GroenLinks presented a joint list at the 2026 election.

== International relations ==
=== Twin cities ===
Almere maintains international relations with the following twin cities:

Aalborg, Denmark; České Budějovice, Czech Republic; Haapsalu, Estonia; Kumasi, Ghana; Lancaster, United Kingdom	Milton Keynes, United Kingdom; Port Sudan, Sudan (1986); Rendsburg, Germany; Tainan City, Taiwan (2009); Växjö, Sweden

== Geography ==
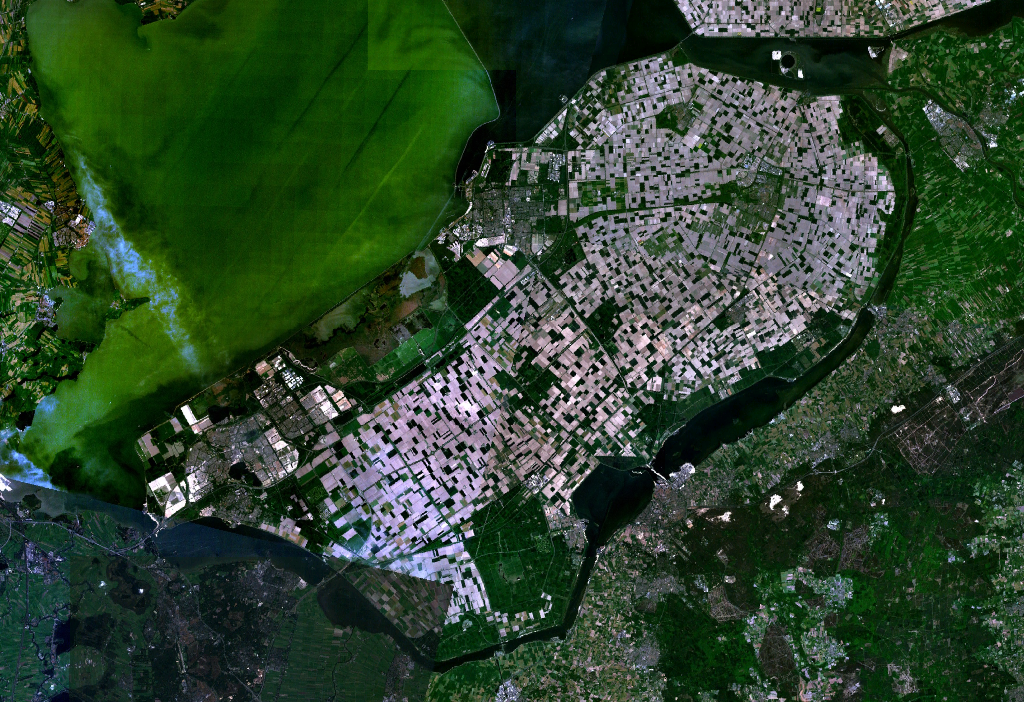
Satellite image of the Flevopolder

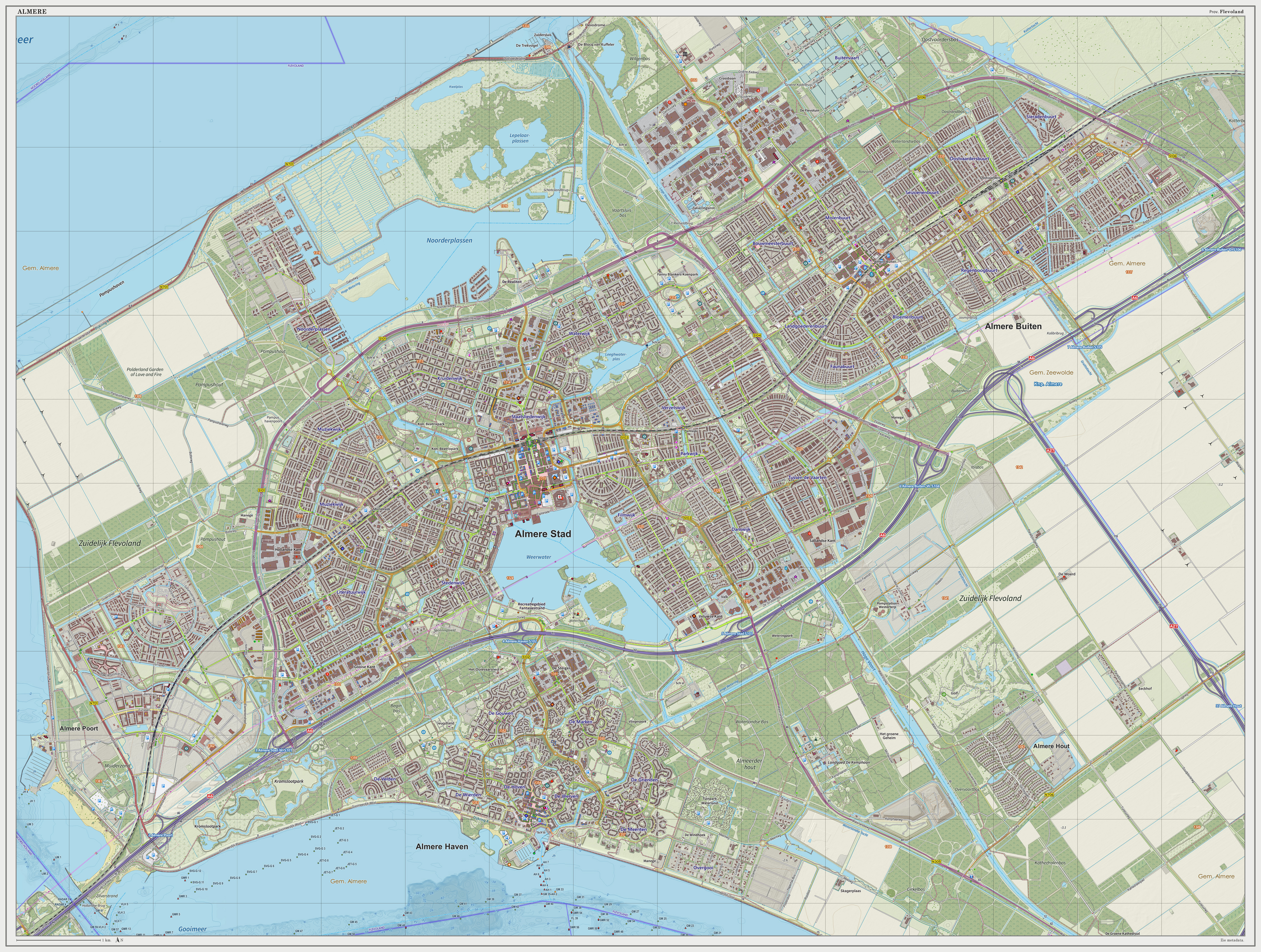
Topographic map of Almere, September 2014

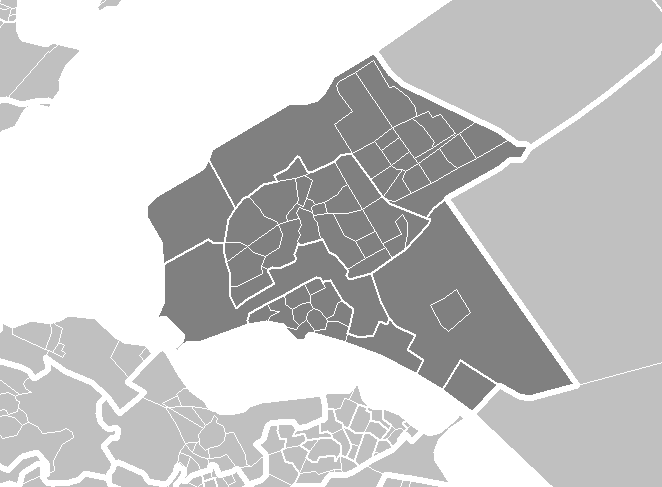
Overview map of Almere

Almere is located in the polder of Southern Flevoland (Dutch: Zuidelijk Flevoland). It is the most western municipality of the province Flevoland. It borders with Markermeer in the west and north, Lelystad in the northeast, Zeewolde in the east, and Gooimeer in the south.

Almere consists of three boroughs and three districts (Dutch: stadsdelen), three of which were under construction as of 2015.

Name	Year	Location
Almere Haven ('Almere Harbor')	1976	
Almere Stad ('Almere City')	1980	
Almere Buiten ('Outer Almere')	1984	
Almere Hout ('Almere Woods')	1991	
Almere Poort ('Almere Gate')	2000	
Almere Pampus	To be constructed	

=== Climate ===
Almere has an oceanic climate characterized by mild to cool winters, and warm summers with fair precipitation year-round.

Climate data for Almere
Month	Jan	Feb	Mar	Apr	May	Jun	Jul	Aug	Sep	Oct	Nov	Dec	Year
Mean daily maximum °C (°F)	4.9 (40.8)	5.5 (41.9)	8.2 (46.8)	9.6 (49.3)	16.2 (61.2)	19.3 (66.7)	20.8 (69.4)	21.0 (69.8)	18.5 (65.3)	14.2 (57.6)	8.9 (48.0)	5.9 (42.6)	12.8 (55.0)
Daily mean °C (°F)	2.2 (36.0)	2.5 (36.5)	4.8 (40.6)	6.7 (44.1)	11.9 (53.4)	14.9 (58.8)	16.5 (61.7)	16.6 (61.9)	14.3 (57.7)	10.6 (51.1)	6.1 (43.0)	3.4 (38.1)	9.2 (48.6)
Mean daily minimum °C (°F)	−0.4 (31.3)	−0.4 (31.3)	1.5 (34.7)	3.8 (38.8)	7.6 (45.7)	10.5 (50.9)	12.3 (54.1)	12.2 (54.0)	10.1 (50.2)	7.1 (44.8)	3.4 (38.1)	0.9 (33.6)	5.7 (42.3)
Average precipitation mm (inches)	68.0 (2.68)	47.0 (1.85)	59.0 (2.32)	45.0 (1.77)	53.0 (2.09)	62.0 (2.44)	75.0 (2.95)	77.0 (3.03)	76.0 (2.99)	80.0 (3.15)	78.0 (3.07)	76.0 (2.99)	838.2 (33.00)
Source: climatedata.org (1981–2010 normals)

== Demography ==
=== Inhabitants by origin ===
2017	Numbers	%
Dutch origin	118,944	54.31
Other European origin	17,380	10.91
Non-European origin	64,590	32.93
Suriname	22,772	11.33
Morocco	7,871	3.92
Indonesia	5,981	2.98
Netherlands Antilles and Aruba	4,955	2.47
Turkey	3,572	1.78
Others	36,819	11.50

=== Total population ===
Year	Almere Haven	Almere Stad	Almere Buiten	Almere Hout	Almere Poort	Almere Pampus	Almere in total
1970							52
1975							47
1980	6,596						6,632
1985	21,410	17,240	1,559				40,297
1990	22,355	37,024	11,499				71,087
1995	22,376	58,816	22,740	564			104,496
2000	22,237	83,934	35,290	1,336			142,797
2005	22,590	103,560	47,358	1,366			175,008
2007	22,507	105,261	51,751	1,345	134		180,998
2016	22,037	109,863	55,663	1,678	10,920		200,812
2024	24,571	110,946	58,481	11,510	22,848	4	228,360

== Culture ==
On 19 May 2004, at the instigation of Kees Kousemaker, owner of the Amsterdam comics store Lambiek, the first buildings of the Stripheldenbuurt were inaugurated in Almere. This is a district where all street names are named after famous comics characters and cartoonists.

== Monuments ==
- The Green Cathedral
- The Slavery monument, gifted to the city and its inhabitants to commemorate the abolition of slavery in 1863, which became effective in 1873.
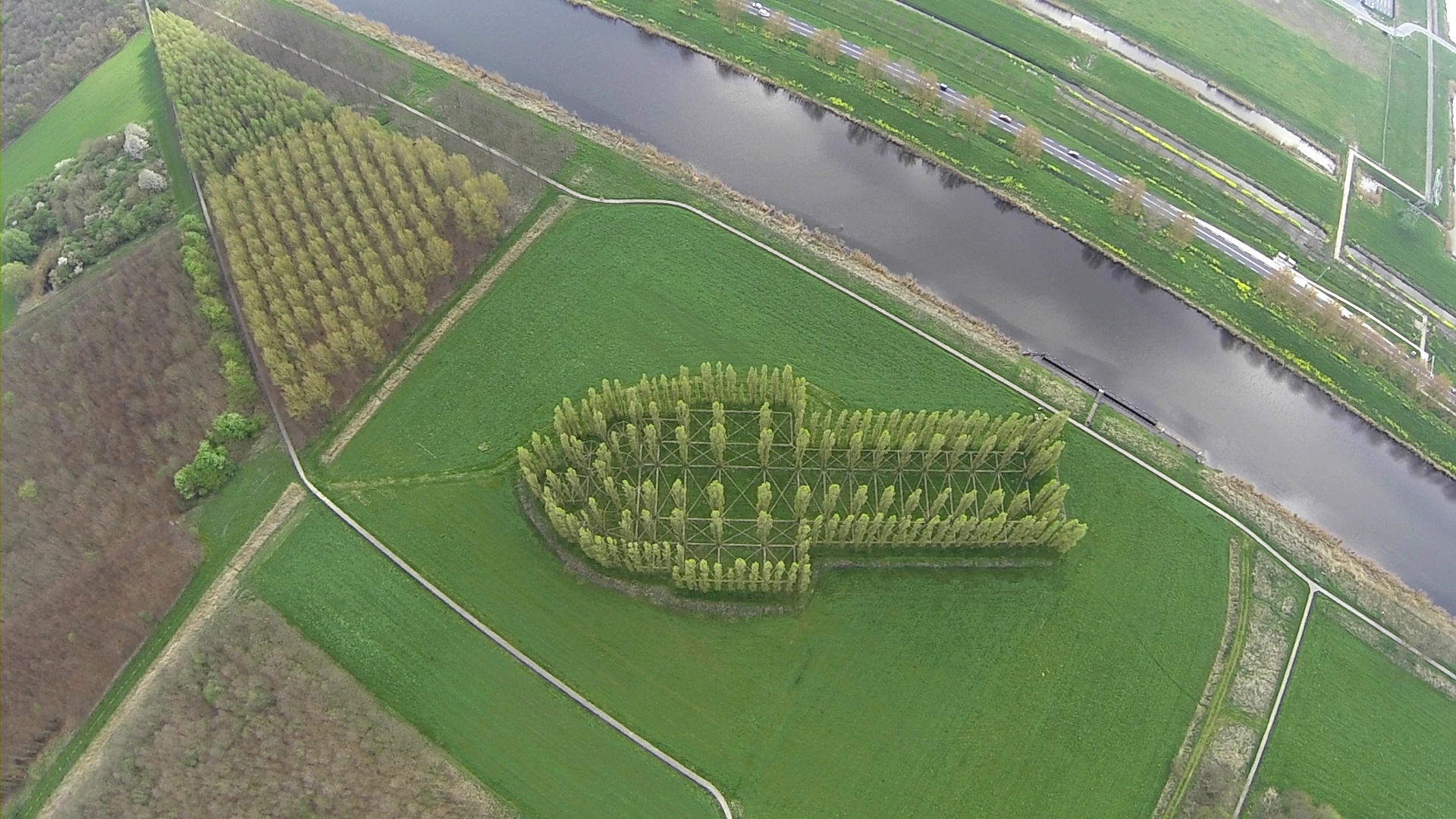
The Green Cathedral

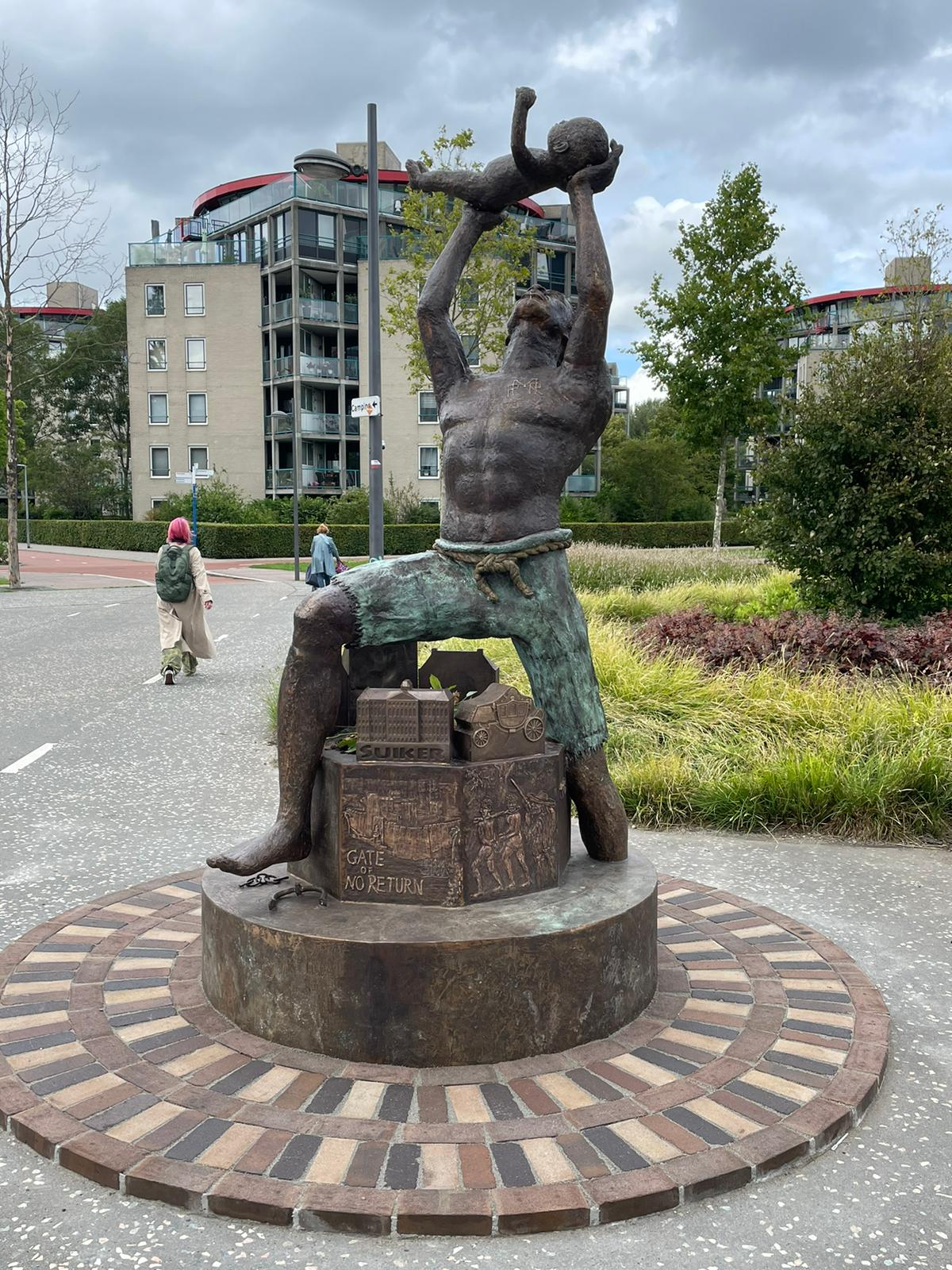
The Slavery monument

== Sport ==
Almere is the home of football team Almere City FC, American football team FlevoPhantoms, and the home of professional basketball team the Almere Sailors.

== Transport ==
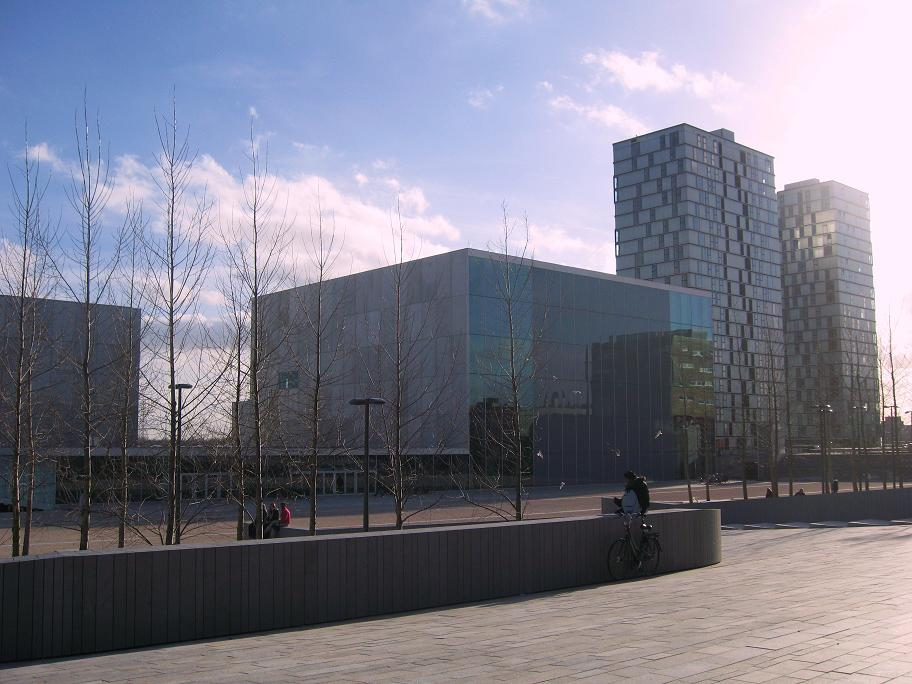
Kunstlinie Almere Flevoland (formerly known as "Schouwburg Almere")

The traffic infrastructure in Almere is recognisable because of its separate infrastructure for cycles (which, in most cases, have separate cycle paths), cars and buses (the buses drive on a separate bus lane in most parts of the city). Almere is connected to the motorways A6 and A27.

=== Railway ===
In 1987 Almere was connected to the national railway system (see NS) with the fully completed Flevolijn which connected Weesp to Lelystad Centrum.

Almere currently has six railway stations:

- Almere Poort (opened December 9, 2012)
- Almere Muziekwijk (opened May 30, 1987)
- Almere Centrum (opened May 30, 1987)
- Almere Parkwijk (opened on February 1, 1996)
- Almere Buiten (opened May 30, 1987)
- Almere Oostvaarders (opened December 12, 2004)

A seasonal-use station, Almere Strand, was set up for certain events, such as Libelle Zomerweek. The station was made up of iron platforms. It was opened in May 1996 under the name Muiderzand. The station was closed after June 1996 but re-opened in June 1999 under the name Muiderstrand and closed again in July 1999. It re-opened again in 2001 under the name Almere Strand as an official seasonal-use station, meaning it was now open certain seasons every year. Because of the rapid development of the adjacent borough Almere Poort, it was decided to open an official station there (see Almere Poort), thus making the station of Almere Strand obsolete. Almere Poort station opened on December 9, 2012. Therefore, Almere Strand station was officially closed just after the summer of 2012 and its iron platforms were torn down in the weekend of October 6–7, 2012. There are no remains of the station, although passengers can still see where the platforms once stood from the windows of Flevolijn trains.

=== Public buses ===
==== Local bus lines ====
In Almere there are 10 bus lines which service the urban area.

Line #	Route	Notes
M1	Almere Centrum Station – Almere Haven De Marken or Almere Haven De Gouwen – Almere Haven Centrum	Runs every 5 minutes Mon-Fri during daytime hours (every 7.5–15 minutes on evenings and Sundays). The bus line changes into M2 at Almere Centrum
M2	Almere Centrum Station – Almere Buiten station - Almere Oostvaarders station - Almere Stripheldenbuurt	Runs every 5 minutes Mon-Fri during daytime hours (every 7.5–15 minutes on evenings and Sundays). The bus line changes into M1 at Almere Centrum
M3	Almere Centrum Station - Almere Beatrixpark - Almere Muziekwijk	Runs every 5 minutes Mon-Fri during daytime hours (every 7.5–15 minutes on evenings and Sundays).
M4	Almere Centrum Station – Almere Literatuurwijk – Almere Gooisekant-West – Almere Poort Homeruskwartier – Almere Poort Station	Runs every 5 minutes Mon-Fri during daytime hours (every 7.5–15 minutes on evenings and Sundays).
M5	Almere Centrum station - Almere Filmwijk - Almere Danswijk - Almere Parkwijk station	Runs every 5 minutes Mon-Fri during daytime hours (every 7.5–15 minutes on evenings and Sundays).
M6	Almere Centrum Station – Noorderplassen	Runs every 7 minutes Mon-Fri (every 15 minutes on Saturdays and every 30 minutes on Sundays).
M7	Almere Centrum station - Almere Parkwijk station - Almere Buiten station - Almere Oostvaarders station	Runs every 5 minutes Mon-Fri during daytime hours (every 7.5–15 minutes on evenings and Sundays).
M8	Almere Centrum Station– Almere Nobelhorst	Runs every 10 minutes Mon-Sat during daytime hours (everybody 15 minutes on evenings and Sundays).
22	Almere De Vaart/PIA – Almere Buiten Station	Mon-Fri only; does not run on evenings and weekends. Has 2 request stops
24	Almere Poort Station - Almere Duin	Only on Mon-Fri in rush hours. During the summer months also on weekends

Monday to Friday, most city buses run about every 5 minutes (10 times every hour) during daytime hours. Saturdays, only a few city bus lines run every 7.5 minutes during daytime hours; most of them run every 12–15 minutes. Sunday, most of the city buses run every 15 minutes (with some buses running extra runs during certain hours) and M6 which only runs every 30 minutes.

There are a few overnight bus lines (Mon-Sat nights only): N21, N22 and N23. They run under the Keolis internal name nightGo (but are operated by R-net branded regional buses).

The bus company running almost all buses is Keolis Netherlands. Local buses (city buses) run under the name allGo. In the buses one can use the national transportation chipcard (smart card), subscriptions or one can buy bus tickets of allGo in the bus or at TVM's (the latter only Downtown).

==== Regional bus lines ====
Besides the local bus lines, there are regional and rush hour bus lines to towns and cities in the area.

Line	Route	Notes
323	Almere Parkwijk station - Almere Poort Station – Muiden P+R - Amsterdam Bijlmer	Mon-Fri between 5.30 AM and 10.30 AM and between 14.00 PM until the end of the day. Sat only after 18.00 PM and Sun all day long.
324	Almere Parkwijk Station – Almere Filmwijk - Amsterdam Bijlmer	Mon-Fri, rush hours-only, express bus without stops in Amsterdam
326	Almere Centrum Station – Busstation 't Oor – Almere De Kemphaan – Blaricum Carpoolplaats	Mon-Fri only; does not run on evenings and weekends.
159	Almere Centrum Station – Almere Veluwsekant – Almere De Kemphaan – Almere Hout – Zeewolde – Harderwijk	Mon-Fri only; does not run on evenings and weekends. The last two buses of the day terminate halfway at Zeewolde Kwartiermakerslaan. Closed-system in Almere.
160	Almere Centrum Station – Busstation 't Oor – Almere De Kemphaan – Zeewolde De Eemhof – Amersfoort Vathorst Station	Runs 7 days a week, but only every 2 hours and only between 10 AM-10:30 PM. This bus is actually part of the OV Regio IJsselmond concession, but Keolis operates it under contract with Syntus Overijssel-branded buses.
322	Almere Parkwijk Station – Almere Flevoziekenhuis – Almere Gooisepoort – Almere Poort Station – Muiden P+R – Diemen Diemerknoop – Amsterdam Amstel	Is allowed to use the emergency lanes on the highway parts of the route to manoeuvre past traffic jams.
327	Almere Haven Centrum – Busstation 't Oor – Muiden P+R – Diemen Diemerknoop – Amsterdam Amstel	Is allowed to use the emergency lanes on the highway parts of the route to manoeuvre past traffic jams.
328	Almere Haven Centrum – Busstation 't Oor – Muiden P+R – Diemen Diemerknoop – Amsterdam Bijlmer	Closed-system in Amsterdam. Is allowed to use the emergency lanes on the highway parts of the route to manoeuvre past traffic jams.

Line 159 is operated by the bus company Connexxion.

Since April 2012, there was a rush hour route, 150, to Utrecht which connected Almere directly with the University Area of Utrecht called De Uithof. (This was previously done by former bus line 295). Due to budget cuts, line 150 was scrapped on July 9, 2016.

== Notable residents ==
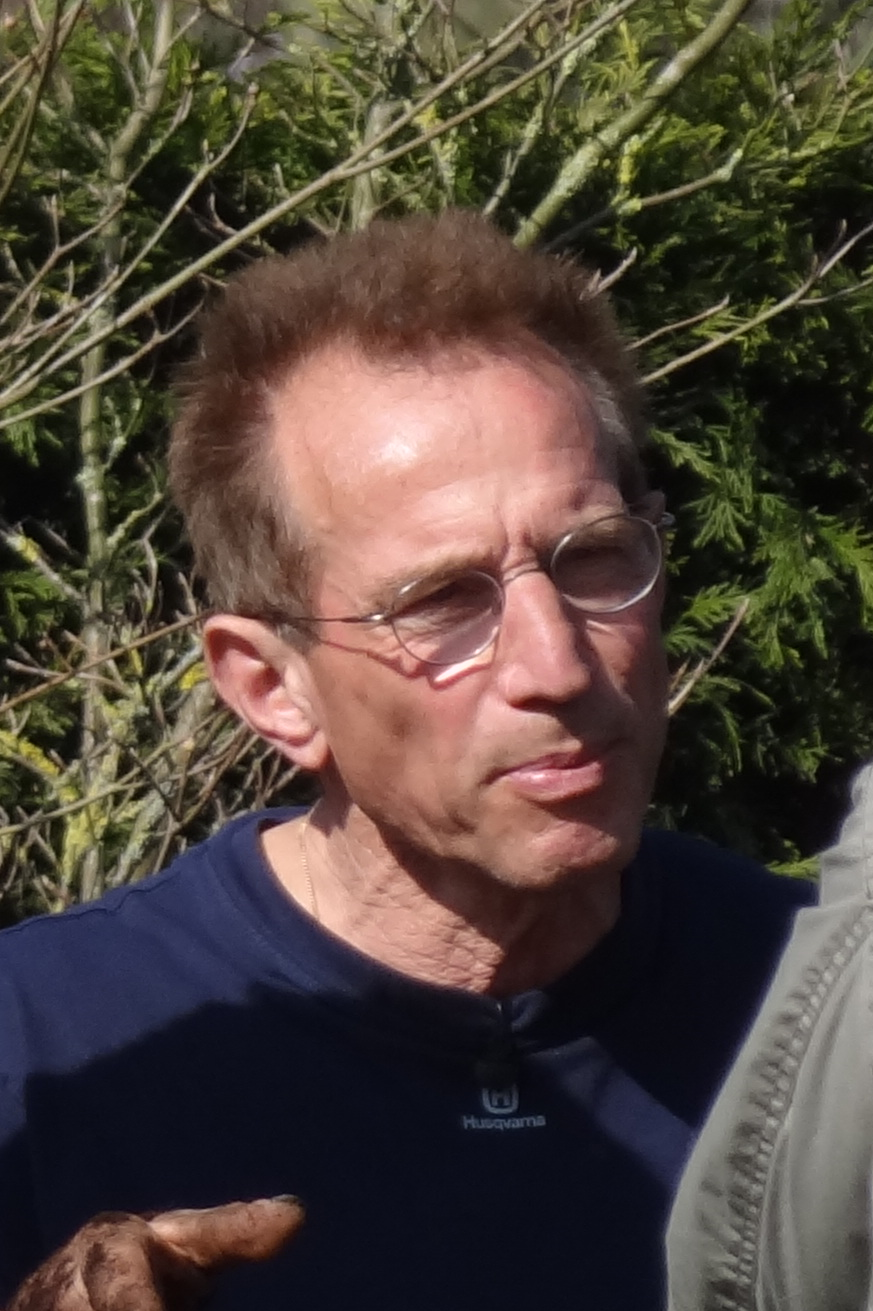
Rob Verlinden, 2012

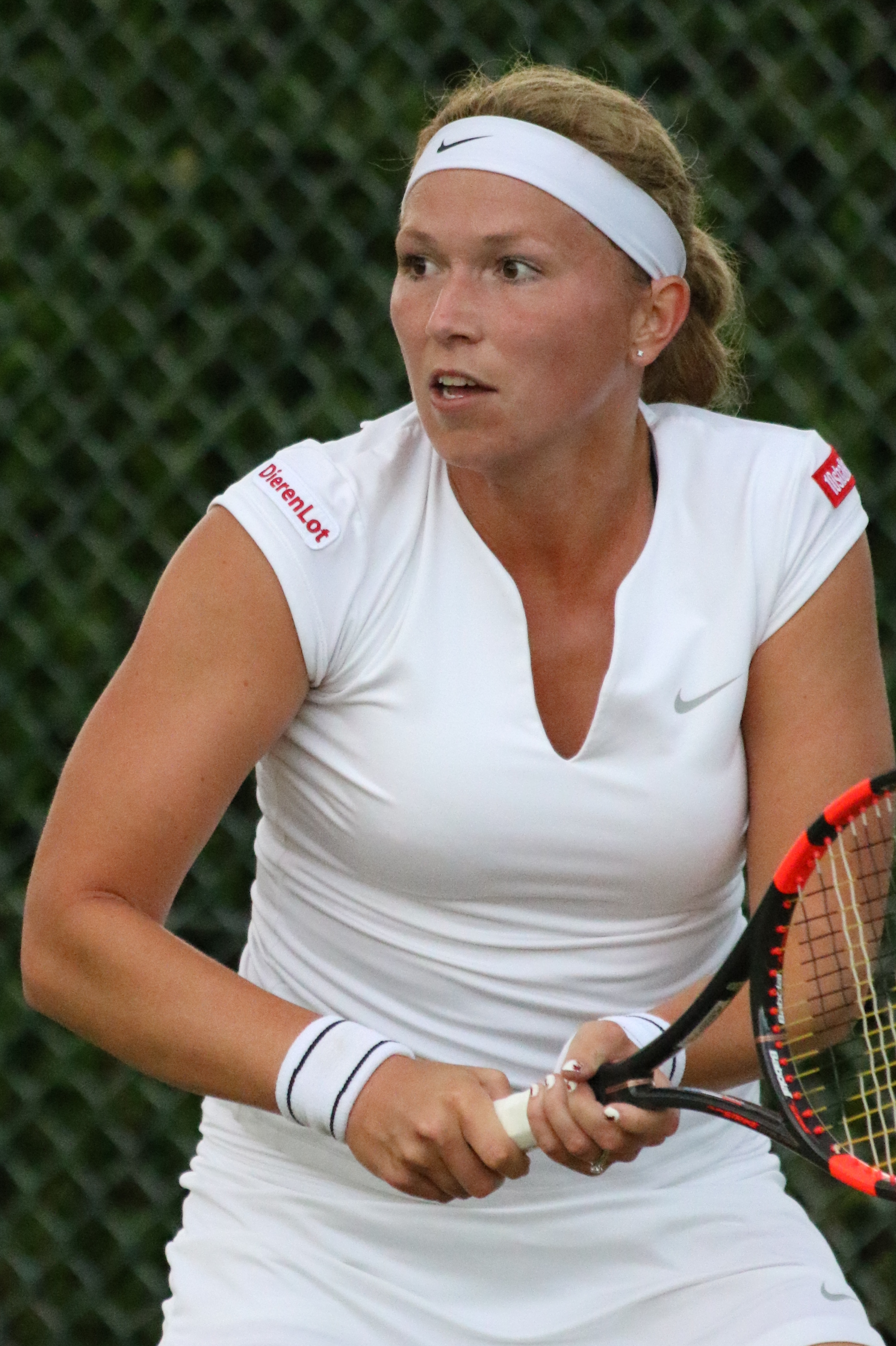
Michaëlla Krajicek, 2016

- Rob Verlinden (born 1950) Dutch gardener, TV presenter on gardening
- Annemarie Jorritsma (born 1950) politician and former mayor of Almere
- Bart van Leeuwen (1950–2017) Dutch photographer, author and radio DJ
- Jörgen Raymann (born 1966) cabaretier, stand-up comedian, actor, presenter and RTV host
- Chris Jansen (born 1966) politician
- Raymzter (born 1979) rapper
- "Angerfist" (Danny Masseling, born 1981) producer and DJ
- Yfke Sturm (born 1981) international model
- Ali B (born 1981) rapper, host/presenter, music label owner
- Alvaro (born 1987) Producer, DJ
- Pieter Elbers (born 1970) CEO KLM

=== Sport ===
- Frank Rijkaard (born 1962) football player and coach
- Remy Bonjasky (born 1976) kickboxer
- Maartje Scheepstra (born 1980) Dutch field hockey player, silver medallist at the 2004 Summer Olympics
- Marco Piqué (born 1980) Dutch-Surinamese welterweight kickboxer
- Hedwiges Maduro (born 1985) football coach and former footballer with over 250 club caps
- Danny Holla (born 1987) footballer with over 300 club caps
- Michaëlla Krajicek (born 1989) Dutch tennis player
- Desiree van Lunteren (born 1992) Dutch footballer
- Niki Wories (born 1996) Dutch figure skater
- Sergiño Dest (born 2000) Dutch/American footballer
- Kevin Doets (born 1998) Dutch darts player

== See also ==
- Floriade 2022
